= List of almshouses in the United Kingdom =

This is a list of British almshouses. It includes historial almshouses (some of which are no longer in use as charitable housing) and new-build almshouses.

== England ==
=== Bedfordshire ===
- Bedford Almshouses, Bedford

=== Berkshire ===
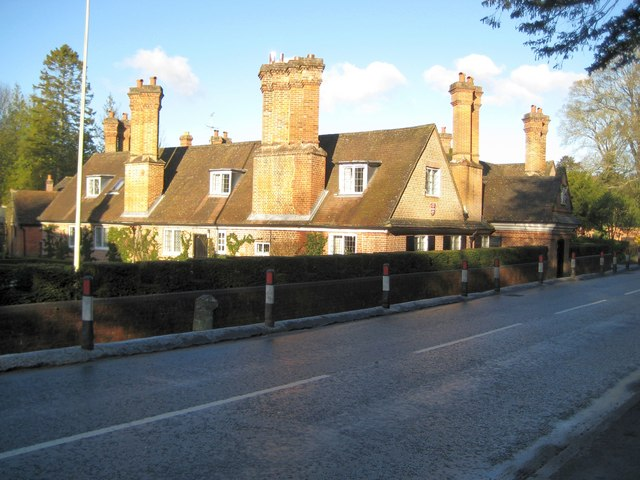
Donnington Hospital

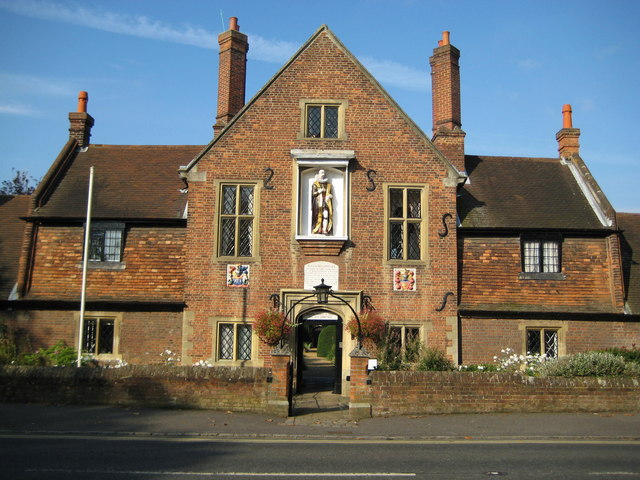
Jesus Hospital, Bray

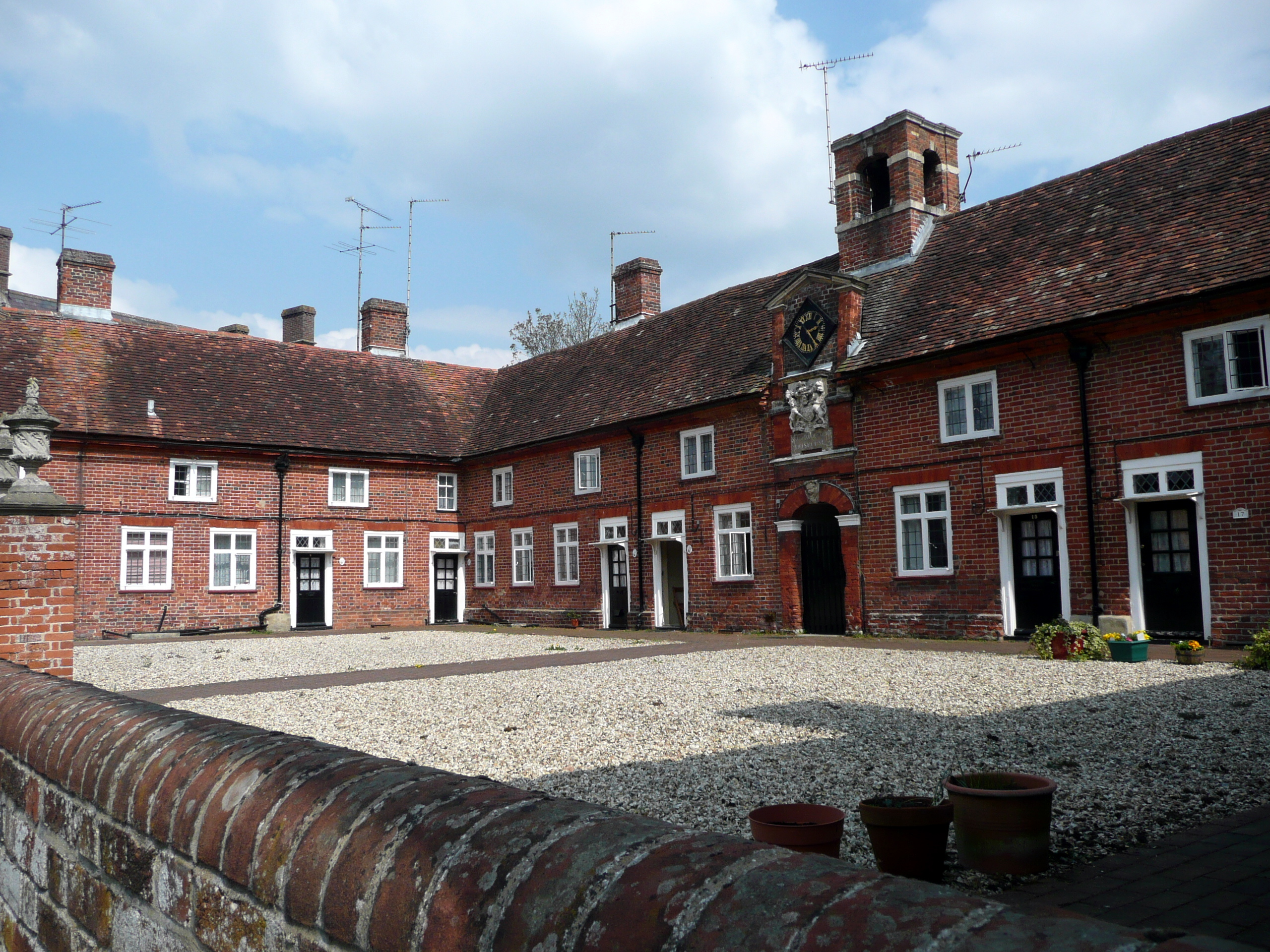
St Bartholomew's Hospital, Newbury

- Andrew's Almshouses, also known as the Widow's House, Speenhamland
- Westende Almshouses, Wokingham
- Dixon's Almshouses, Aldermaston (built 1706)
- Donnington Hospital, Bucklebury & Iffley, Oxon (founded 1393)
- Henry Lucas Hospital, Wokingham (1663–2001)
- Langley Almshouses, Langley Marish (founded 1617)
- Jesus Hospital, Bray (founded 1609, built 1627)
- John Isbury's Almshouses, Lambourn (founded 1502, rebuilt 1852)
- Place's or Jacob Hardrett's Almshouses, Lambourn (founded 1627, rebuilt 1827)
- The Haven of Rest Almshouses, Maidenhead
- St Mary's Almshouses, Newbury (built c.1970)
- Pearces Almshouses, Newbury (founded 1671, relocated 1885)
- Old Hunt's Almshouses, Newbury (endowed 1727, rebuilt 1817)
- Coxedd's Almshouses, Newbury (founded 1690)
- Newbury Church & Almshouse Charity Almshouses, Newbury (Newtown Road & Harvest Green)
- Kimber's Almshouses, Newbury
- Raymond's Almshouses, Newbury
- Essex Wynter Almshouses, Newbury
- Mabel Luke Almshouses, Newbury
- Robinson's Almshouses, Newbury
- St Bartholomew's Hospital, also known as King John's Almshouses, Newbury (founded before 1200, built 1618, reconstructed c.1698)
- St Peter's Almshouses, Brimpton (built 1854)
- Seymour Almshouses, Langley Marish (founded 1679, extended 1687)
- Vachel Almshouses, Reading (founded 1634, rebuilt 1864–1867)

=== Bristol ===
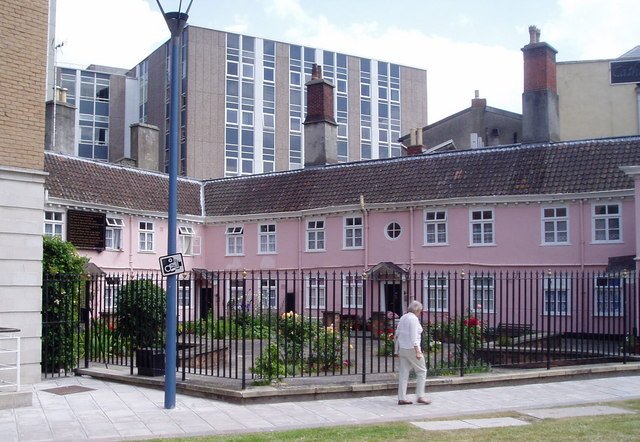
Merchant Venturers Almshouses, Bristol

- Colstons Almshouses, St Michaels Hill, which were built in 1691 and are Grade I listed
- Dr White's Almshouse (founded 1613, moved 1968)
- Foster's Almshouses, Colston Street (founded 1482, chapel built 1504, substantial restoration and rebuilding 1861–1883)
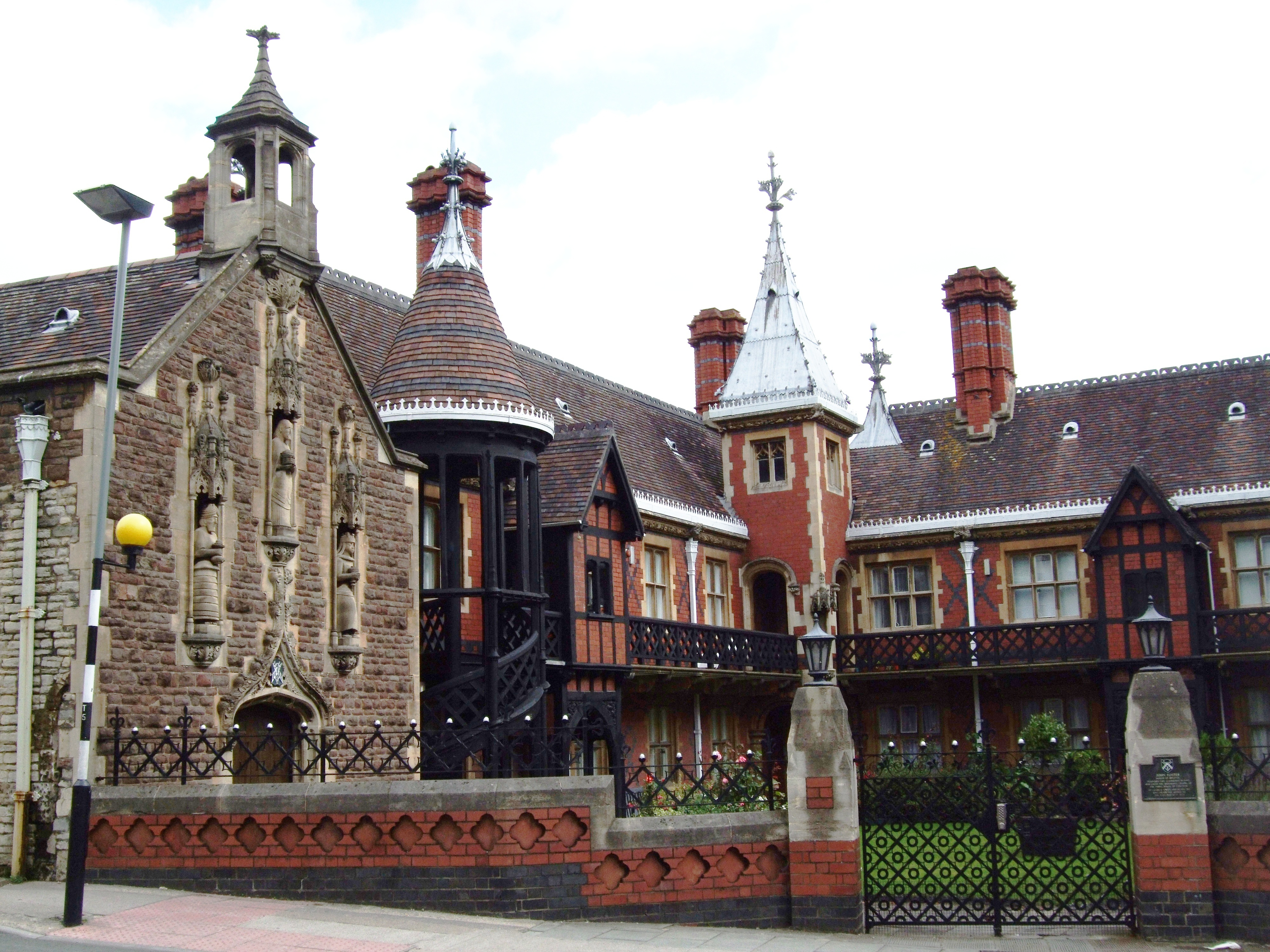
  Fosters Almshouses, Bristol
- Bengough's Almshouses, Horfield Road
- Haberfield House, Hotwell Road
- Hill's Almshouses (now Stoneleigh House), Jacob's Wells Road
- Merchant Taylors' Almshouses (Worshipful Company of Merchant Taylors), Merchant Street (1701)
- Merchant Venturers Almshouses, King Street, which were built c.1696 and are Grade II* listed.
- Holy Trinity Almshouses, Old Market Street
- Perry's Almshouses, Dragon Road, Winterbourne
- St Ambrose Almshouses, Park Crescent
- St Monica's Home of Rest, (Merchant Venturers Almshouses) Cote Lane (1925)
- St Nicholas's Almshouses (built 1652–1656)

=== Buckinghamshire ===
- The Almshouse Charity of Sir Ralph Verney (1st Baronet, d. 1696), Middle Claydon, Buckingham (1654)
- The Bishop Kings' Almshouses, Worminghall (1675)
- Christ's Hospital, Buckingham
- Miss Day's Almhouses, Amersham
- Lady Dodd's Cottages, Ellesborough
- Thomas Hickman's Almshouses, Aylesbury (1695)
- Weedon's Almshouses, Chesham
- Sir William Drake's Almhouse, Amersham
- Dormer Almshouses (Hospital), Wing (misdated as 1569)
- Winwood Almshouses, Quainton (1687)
- Stafford Almshouse, Shenley (1654)
- Revis Almshouses, Newport Pagnell (1755)
- Alice Carter's Almshouse, Brill (1591)
- Dormer Almshouses, Hughendon
- Finch Almshouses, Ravenstone
- Ann Hopkins Smith Almshouses, Olney (1819)
- Goodwin Almshouses, Waddesdon
- St Scholastica's Retreat, Princes Risborough (founded in 1861 at Clapton, moved to Princes Risborough 1972)

=== Cambridgeshire ===
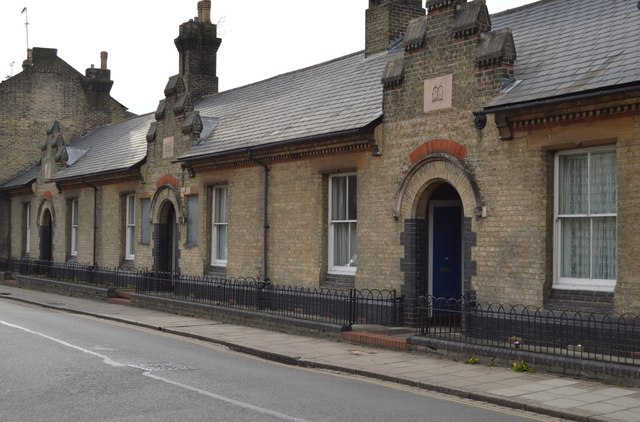
King St Almshouses, Cambridge

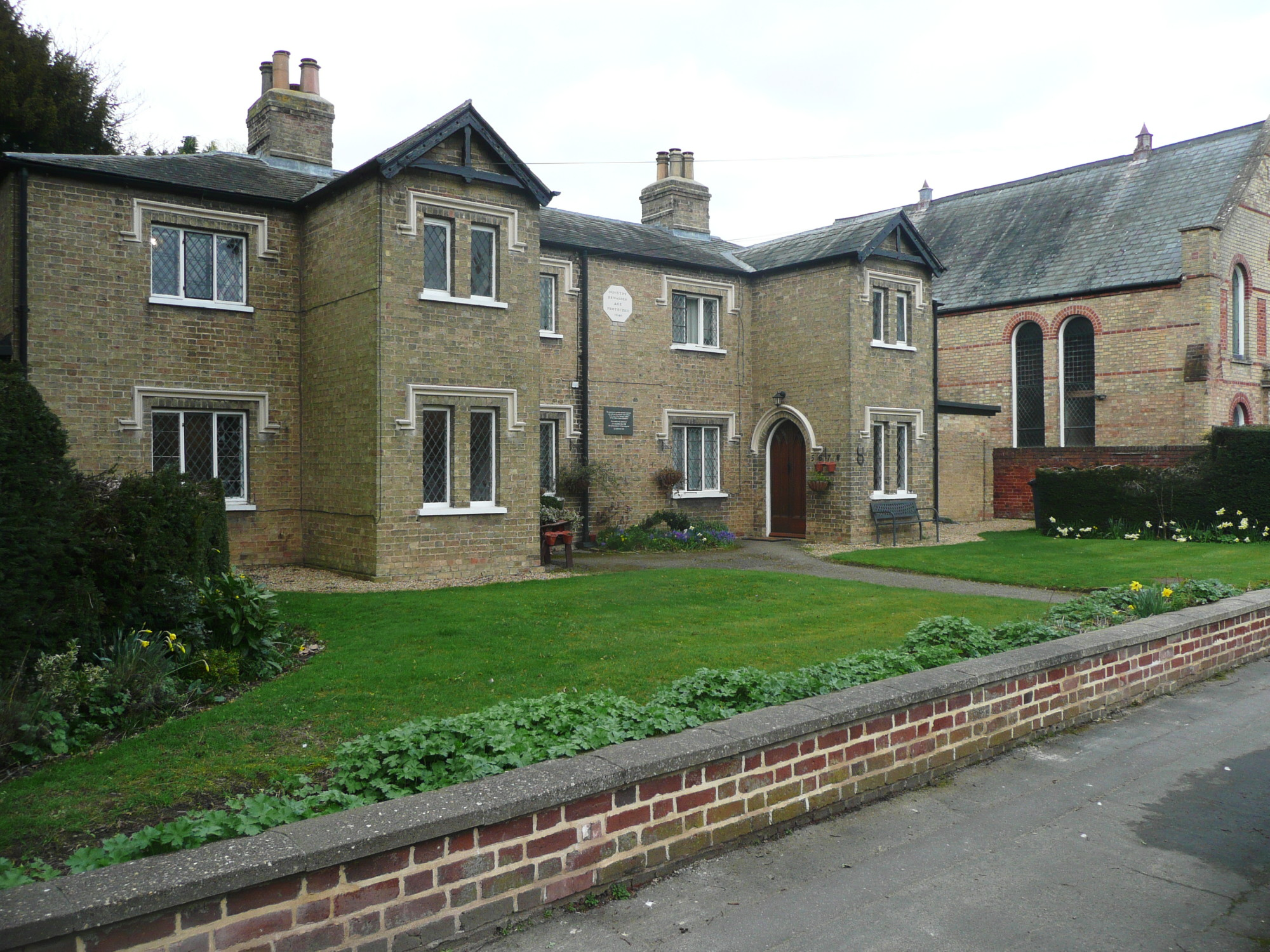
South's Almshouses, Buckden

- Burberry Homes, Buckden
- Hospital of St. Anthony and St. Eligius, known as Spital House, a new-build almshouse in Cambridge
- Countess of Hardwicke Almshouses, Arrington
- Jakenett's Almshouses, Cambridge
- John Street Almshouses, Cambridge (new-build)
- Jenyns House, March Almshouse and Pension Charity, March
- Kings Street Almshouses, Cambridge
- Lady Peyton's Almshouses, Isleham
- Littleport Town Lands, Littleport
- Mansfield Almshouses, Chesterton, Cambridge
- Moretons Charity Almhouses, Cottenham (built 1853)
- Parsons Almshouses, Ely
- Perse Almshouses, Cambridge
- Pilgrim's Rest Almshouses, St Ives
- South's Almshouses, Buckden (built 1850)
- St John's Almshouses, Huntingdon (built 1847)
- Storey's Almshouses, Mount Pleasant, Cambridge
- The Cambridge Royal Albert Homes, Cambridge

=== Cheshire ===
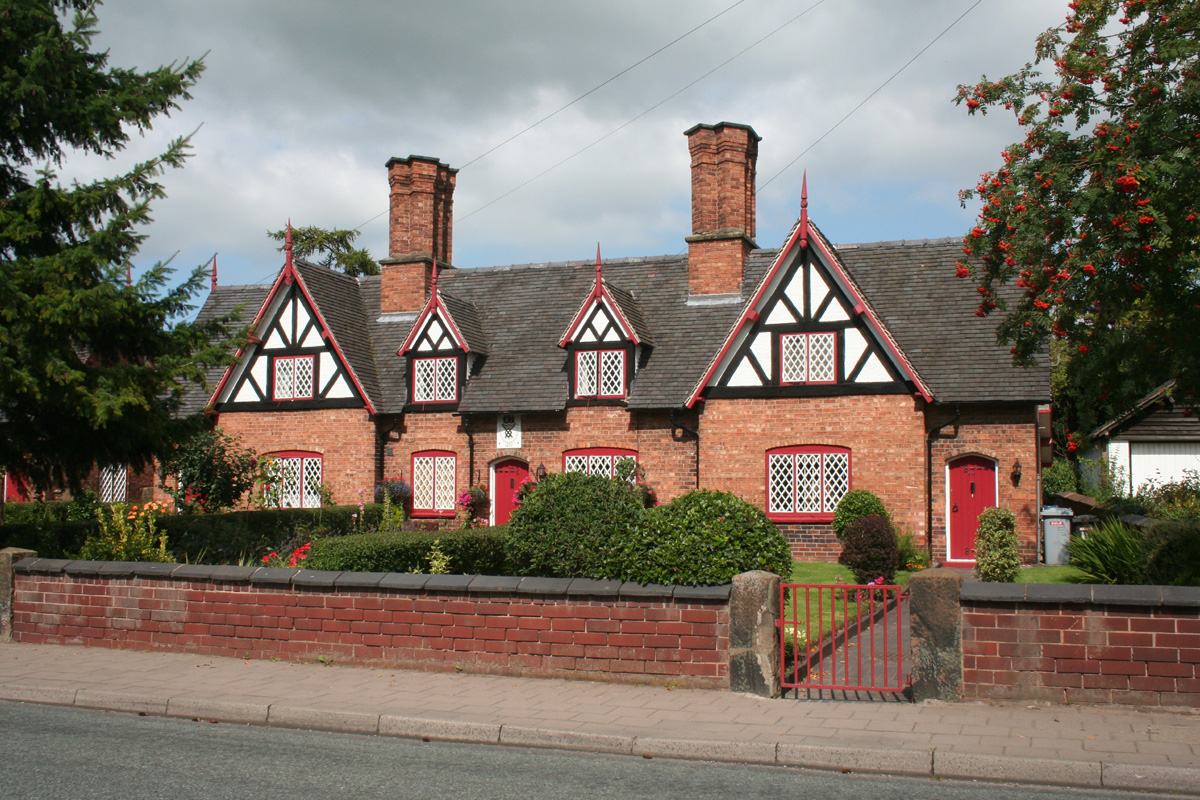
Tollemache Almshouses, Nantwich

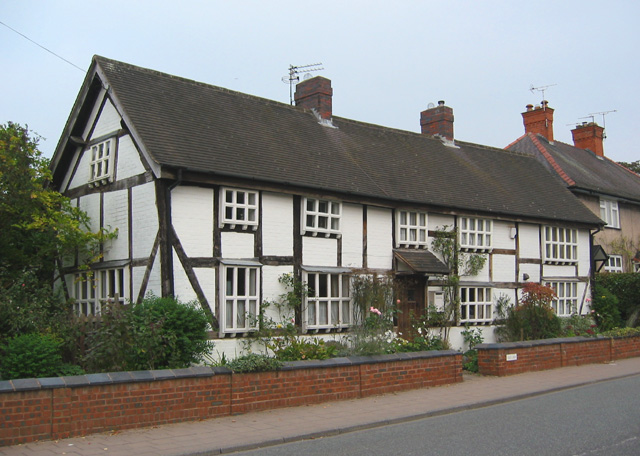
Wilbraham's Almshouses, Nantwich

- Crewe Almshouses, Nantwich (built 1767)
- Dixons Almshouses, Listed buildings in Christleton
- Harriet Hope Almshouses, Crewe Almshouses, Nantwich
- Hospital of St Lawrence, Acton
- Lumley Place Almshouses, Chester (Grade II listed)
- Nine Houses, Chester, Park Street: only six remain
- Tollemache Almshouses, Nantwich (built 1870)
- Widows' Almshouses, Nantwich
- Wilbraham's Almshouses, Acton (built 1613)
- Wilbraham's Almshouses, Nantwich
- Wood and Garnett Almshouses, Nantwich
- Wood and Garnett Almshouses, Willaston
- Wright's Almshouses, Nantwich (built 1638)

=== Cornwall ===
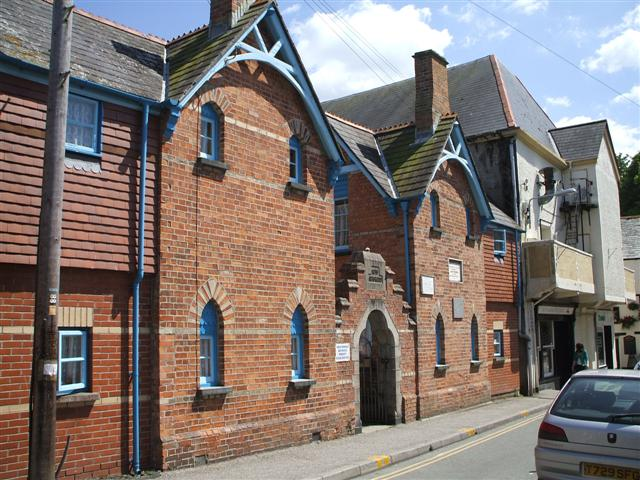
Padstow Almshouses

- Almshouses, St. Stephen in St Stephen-in-Brannel
- Buller Almshouses, Barker's Hill, Saltash
- Earle's Retreat, Trelawney Road, Falmouth
- Fowey Almshouses, 1 Cobb's Well, Fowey
- Hugh Boscawen Almshouses, Tregony Hill, Tregony
- Kensey Place, Dockacre Road, Launceston
- Maids House, Quethiock
- Morval Almshouses, Morval
- Mr Lanyon's Almshouses, Halvarras Road, Kea
- Padstow Almshouses, Middle Street, Padstow
- Poads Trust Almshouses, Menheniot
- Rashleigh Almshouses, Polmear Hill, Polmear
- Sir William Moyle's Almshouses, Gallery Lane, St Germans

=== Cumbria ===
- St Anne's Hospital, Appleby-in-Westmorland
- Sandes Hospital Cottages in Kendal, 1663.

=== Derbyshire ===
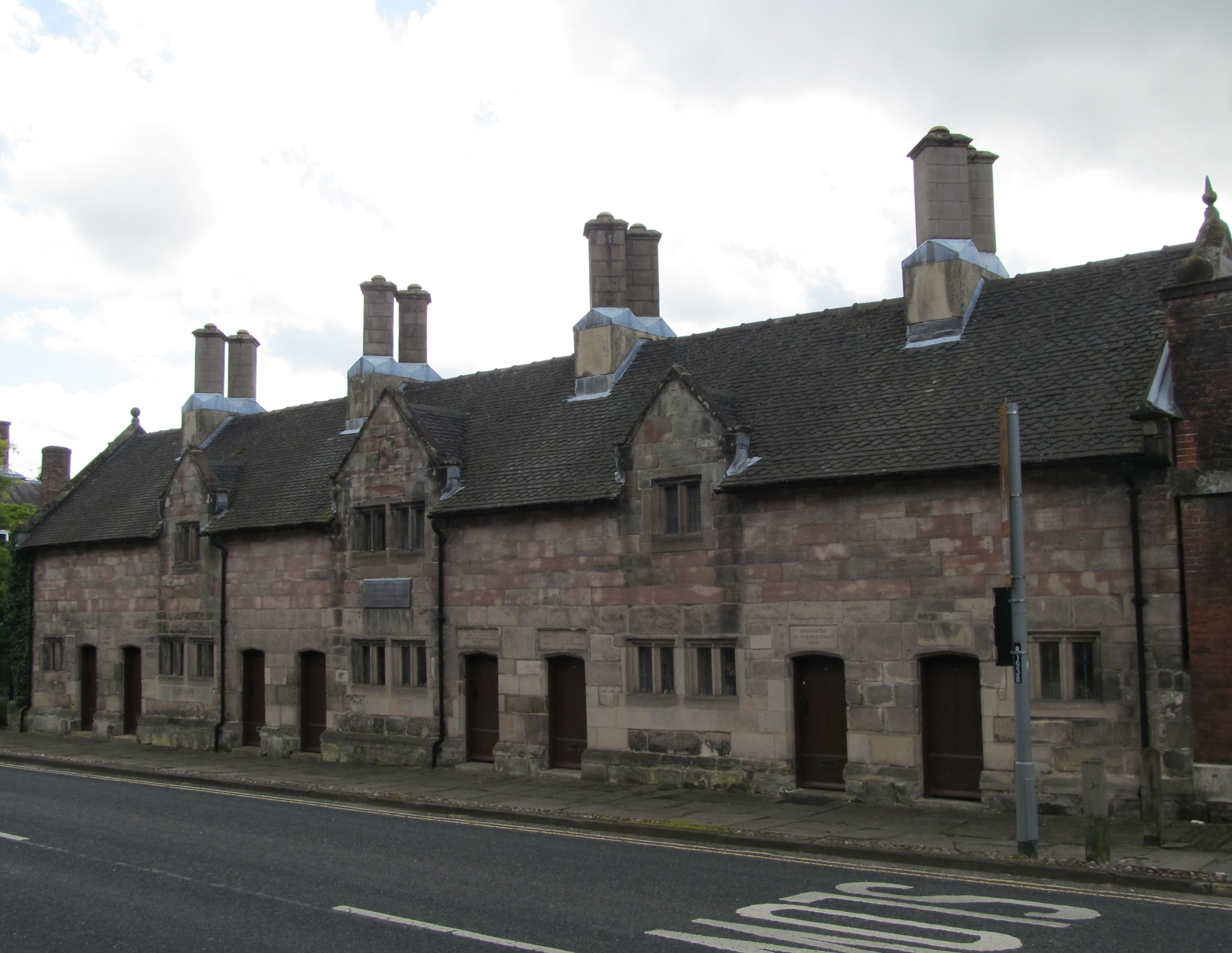
Owlfield Almshouses, Ashbourne, Derbyshire

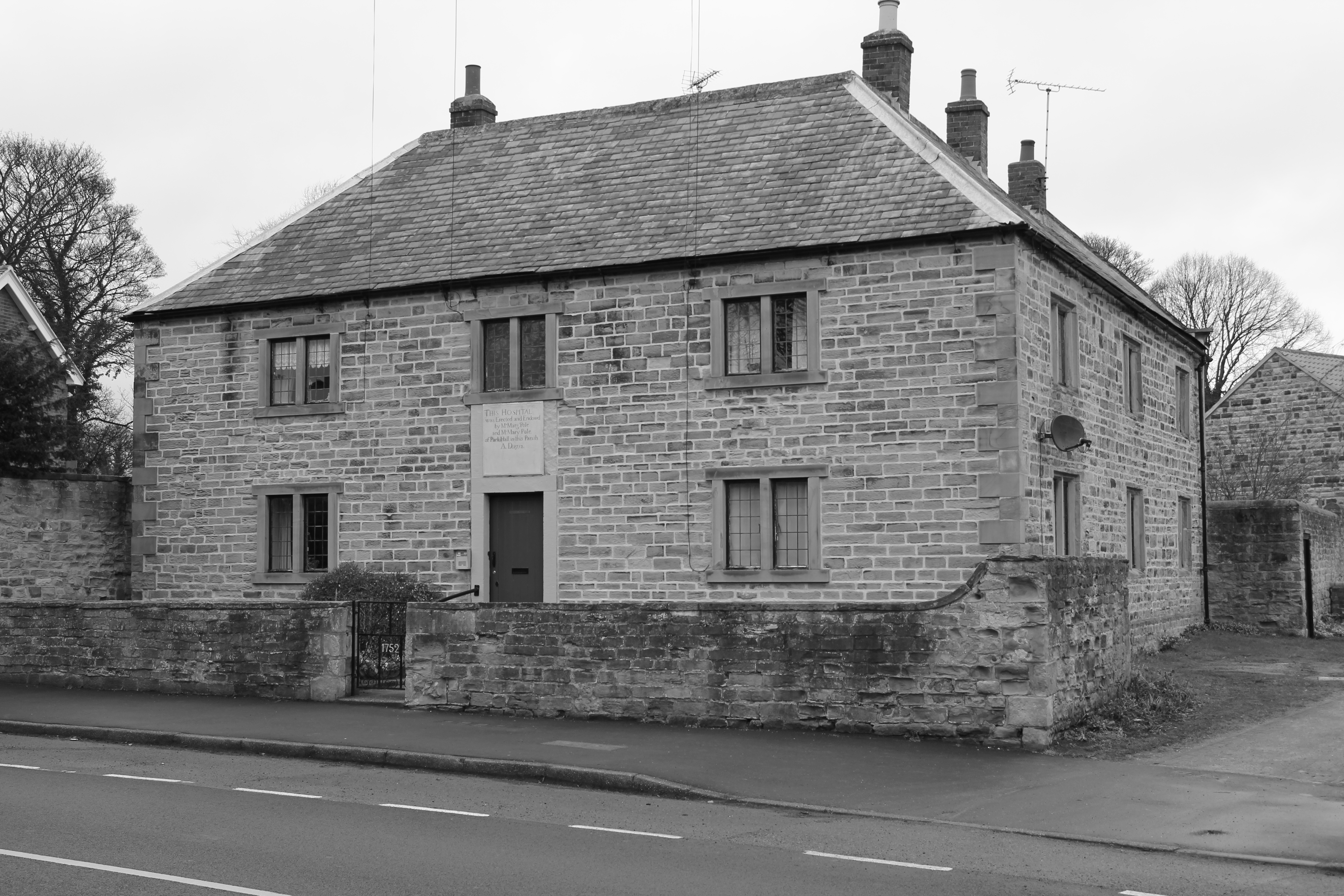
Chandos Pole House, Barlborough

- Chandos Pole House, Church Street, Barlborough, registered as Barlborough Hospital
- Clergy Widows' Almshouses, also known as Spalden's Almshouses, School Lane, Ashbourne
- Cooper's Almshouses, 1–11 Derby Road, Ashbourne
- London Road Almshouses, Derby
- Matthew Smiths Almshouses, Belper
- Owlfield and Pegge's Almshouses, Ashbourne
- Thomas Cook Almshouses, Melbourne

=== Devon ===
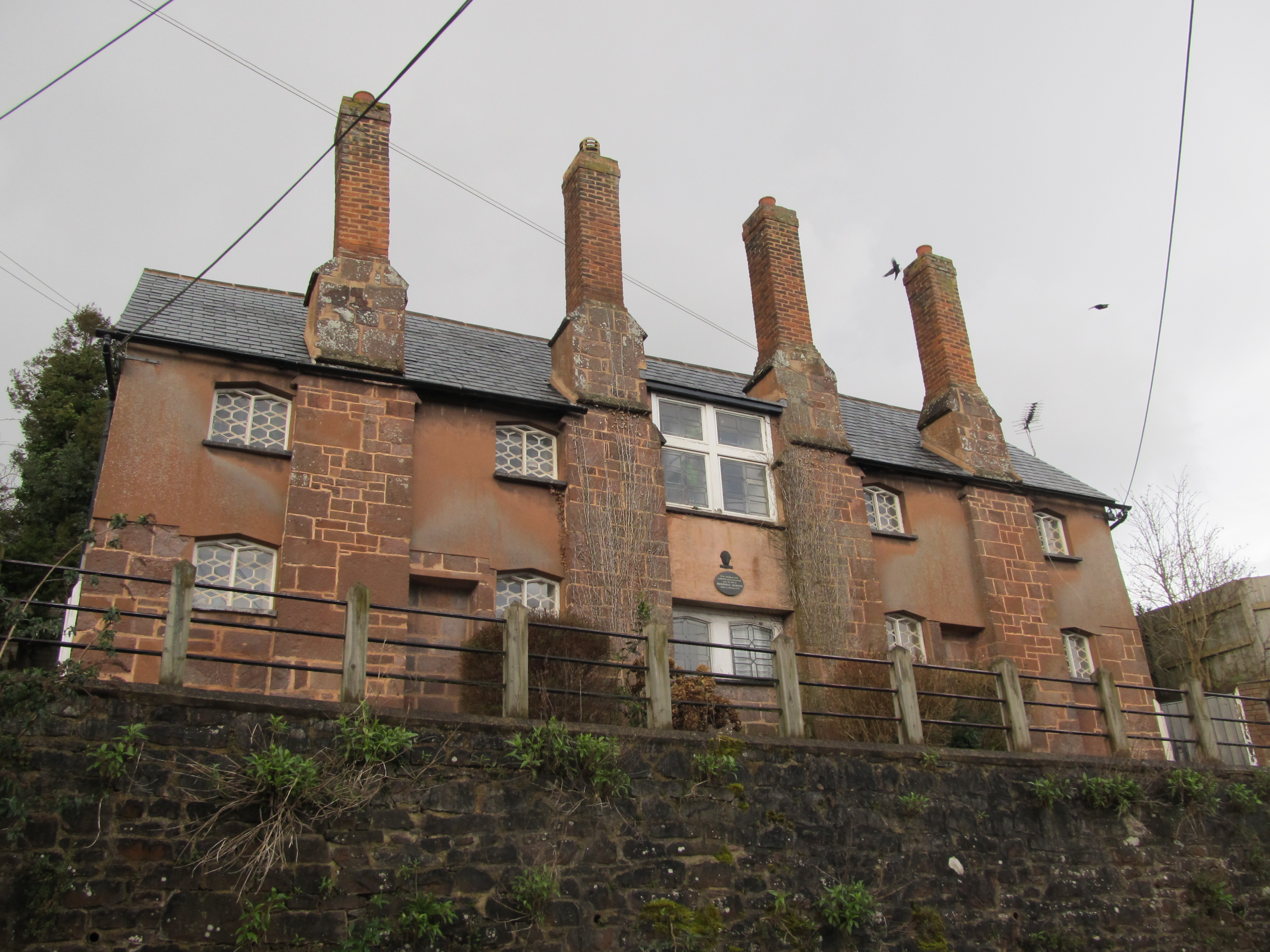
Spurways Almshouses, Crediton, Devon

- Almshouses, New Street, Great Torrington
- Burrough's Almshouses, Church Lane, Broadclyst
- Dartmouth United Charities Almshouses, Dartmouth
- Colmer Almshouses, Ford, Plymouth
- Cockington Almshouses, Cockington Lane, Cockington
- Gilberd's Almshouses, Old Exeter Road, Newton Abbot (new build)
- John Greenway Gardens, Gold Street, Tiverton
- Lady Lucy Reynell's Clergy Widows' Houses, Torquay Road, Newton Abbot
- Mackrell's Almshouses, Wolborough Street, Newton Abbot
- Penrose's Almshouses, Lichdon Street, Barnstaple, built by Richard Beaple; they were Grade I listed in 1951.
- Robert Hayman Almshouses, East Street, Newton Abbot
- Salem Almshouses, Trinity Street, Barnstaple
- Spurways Almshouses, Park Street, Crediton
- Strange & Armory Almshouses, Bridge Plats Way, Londonderry, Bideford (new build)
- St Catherine's Almshouses and Chapel, Catherine Street, Exeter (ruins – founded by Canon John Stevens DD Doctor of Physick in 1457 to house 13 poor men)
- Mary Parminter Charity, Point in View, Summer Lane, Exmouth

=== Dorset ===
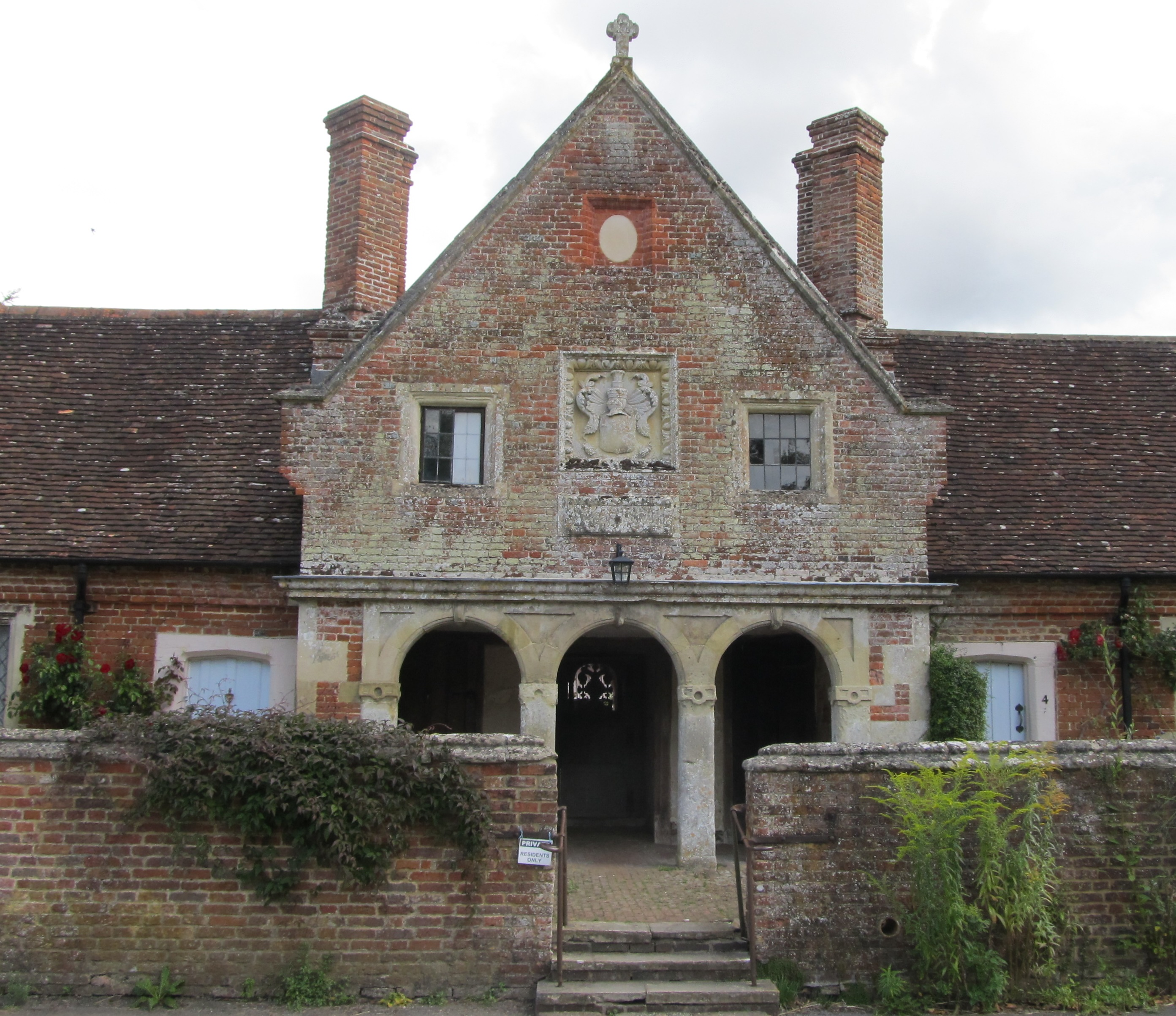
Sir Anthony Ashley's Almshouses, Wimbourne St Giles, Dorset

- Barnes Homes Almhouses, Blandford Forum
- Ryves Almshouses, Blandford Forum
- Daniel Taylors Almshouses, Bridport
- South Street Almshouse, Bridport
- Magdalen Almshouses, Bridport
- Dorchester Municipal Charities, Dorchester
- Tregonwell Almshouses, Milton Abbas
- St George's Almshouses, Poole
- Shaftesbury Municipal Almshouse Charity, Shaftesbury
- Almshouse of Saint John the Evangelist and John the Baptist, Sherborne
- Sir Anthony Ashley's Almshouses, Wimborne St Giles
- Stretche's Almshouses, Wareham

=== Durham ===
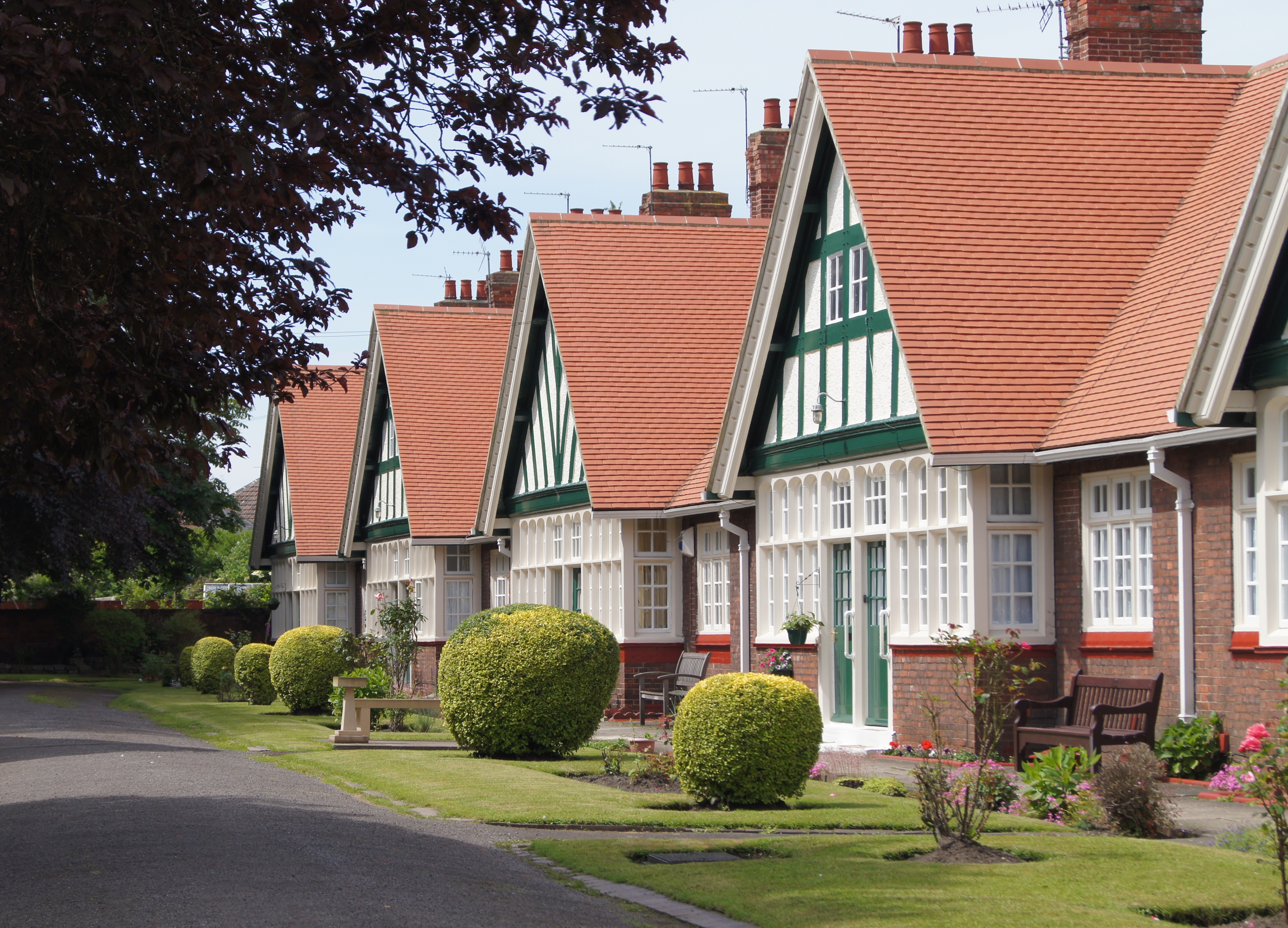
Fox Almshouses in Norton, County Durham

- Durham Aged Mineworkers Homes Association in Chester-le-Street is the largest almshouse charity in the UK. It covers the entirety of the Durham coalfield, and manages approximately 1800 homes.
- Jacob Wright Cottages, Evenwood
- William Russell Bequest, Brancepeth
- Fox Almshouses, Norton, Stockton-on-Tees
- Trinity Gardens Almshouses, Stockton-on-Tees
- St. John of God (Stitchell House), Greatham

=== Essex ===
- Barfield's Almshouses, Dedham
- Barker's Almshouses, Dedham
- Dunton's Almshouses, Dedham
- John Henry Keene Memorial Homes, Chelmsford
- Parmiter's Almshouse & Pension Charity, Clacton-on-Sea
- Shen Place Almshouses, Shenfield
- Sir William Petre Almshouses, Ingatestone
- South Weald Almshouses, South Weald
- Fuller House (The Almshouses), Church Road, Stansted Mountfitchet

=== Gloucestershire ===
- Almshouses, Great Badminton
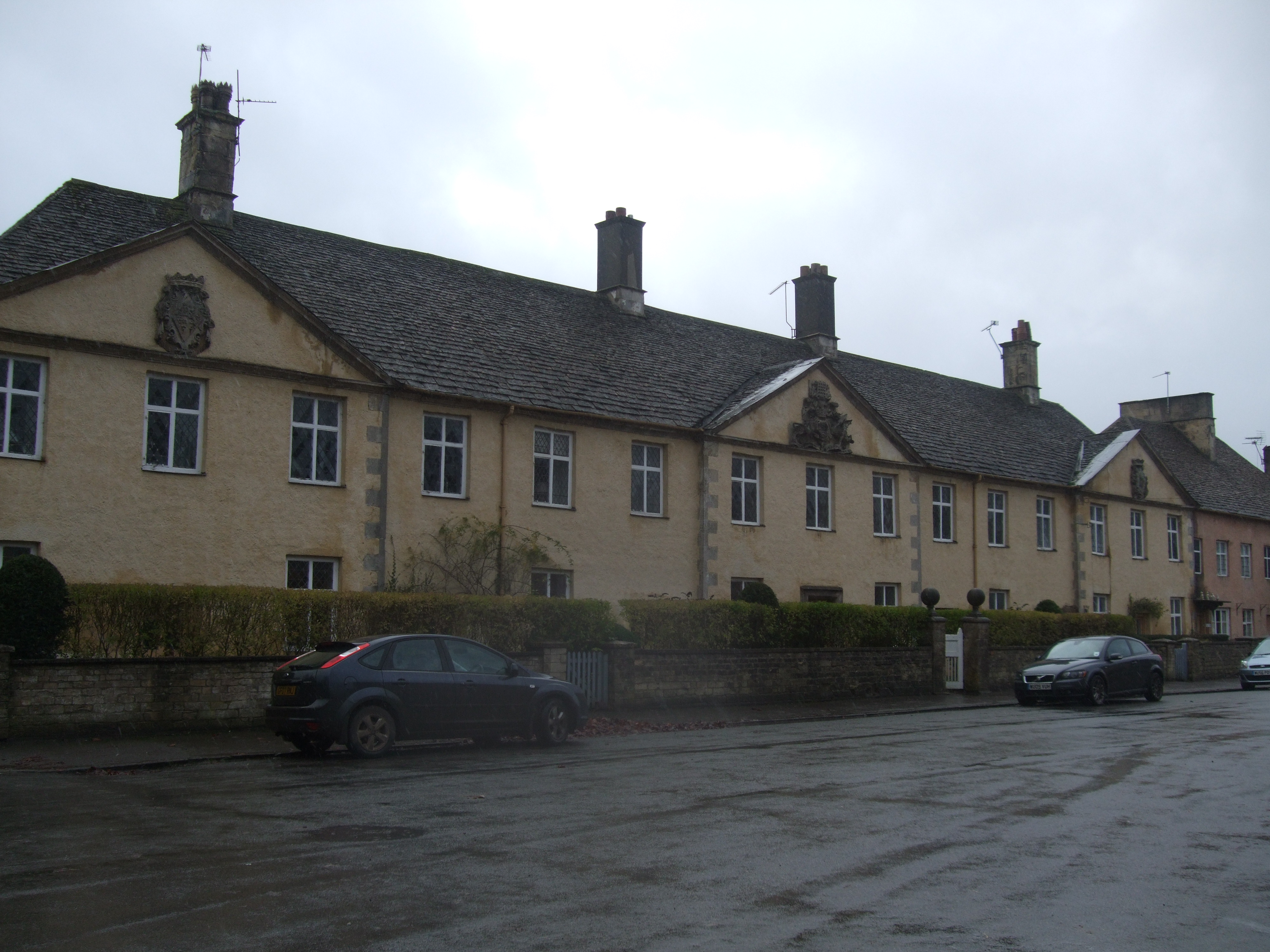
  Great Badminton Almshouses, Gloucestershire
- Christopher & Sarah Bowley's Almshouses, Tetbury
- Newlands almshouses, Newlands
- Perry & Dawes Almshouses, Wotton-under-Edge
- St Lawrence's Almshouses, Cirencester
- The Gorse Almshouses, Coleford

=== Hampshire ===
- Deane's Almshouses, Basingstoke: see Grade II* listed buildings in Basingstoke and Deane
- Forbes Almshouses, East Meon
- Geffery's House, Hook
- Thorner's Homes, Southampton: founded by Robert Thorner in his will of 1690, the first almshouses opened in 1793, after much arguing with the trustees of the time over other gifts in his will, such as to Harvard College. The charity houses poor widows and single women of limited financial means over 55 years of age.
- Hospital of St Cross, Winchester: said to be the oldest charitable institution in England. Founded by Henry of Blois, Bishop of Winchester, in 1136. Home for 25 elderly men, known as Brothers, under a Master. They belong to the Order of the Hospital of St Cross founded c.1132 and wear black trencher hats and robes with silver Jerusalem cross badge. The Order of Noble Poverty, founded 1445, wear claret trencher hats and robes with silver cardinal's badge in memory of Cardinal Beaufort.
- St John's Almshouses, Winchester
- Earl of Southampton Trust almshouses, Titchfield

=== Herefordshire ===
- Coningsby Hospital, Hereford
- Duppa's Almshouses, Pembridge, which are Grade II listed
- The Lazarus Hospital
- Lingen Hospital
- Saint Ethelbert's Hospital
- Saint Giles' Hospital
- Williams' Hospital, Hereford (built 1601)
- Prices Almshouses
- Aubrey's Almshouses
- Rudhall Almshouses, Ross-on-Wye

=== Hertfordshire ===
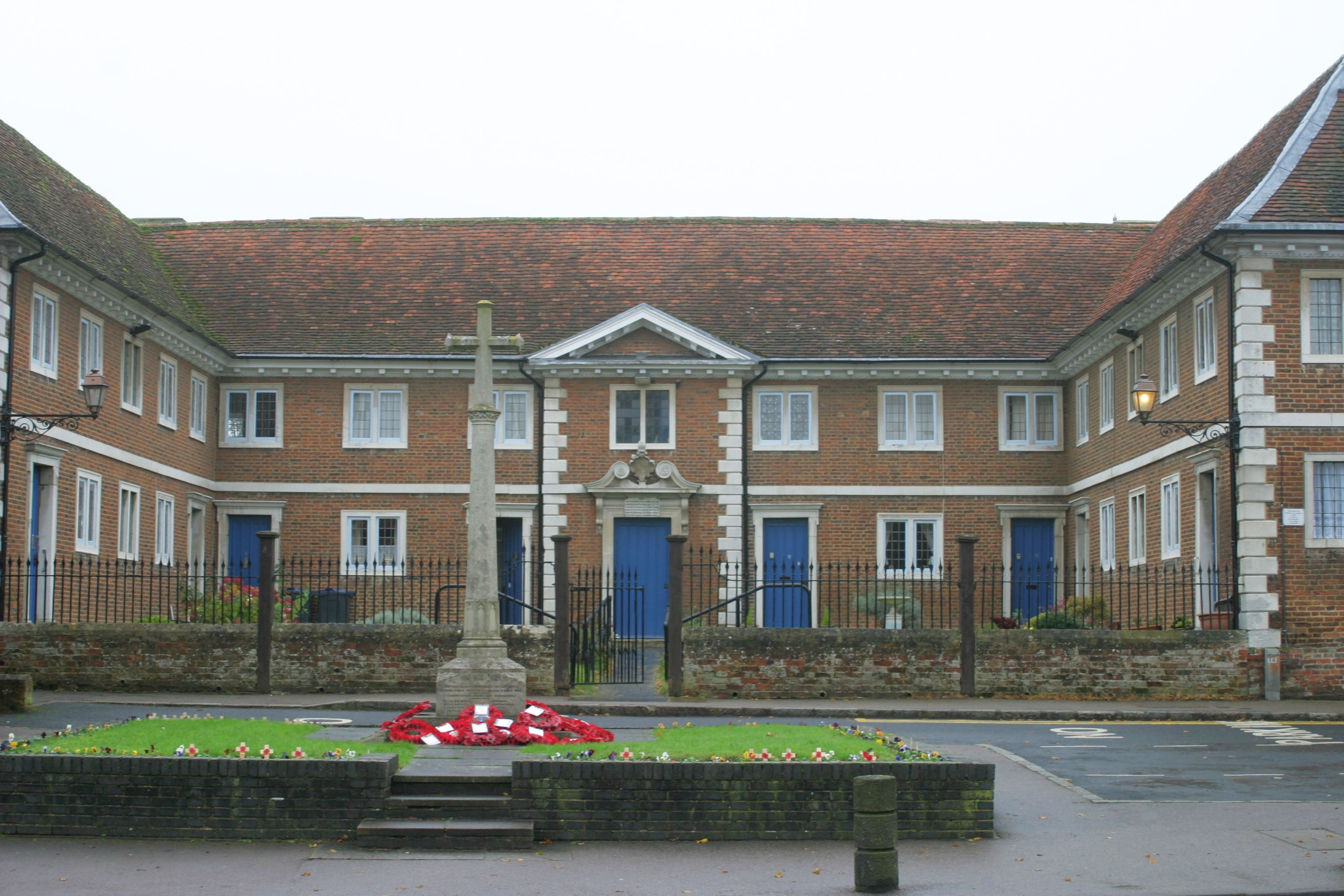
Buntingford Almshouses, Buntingford, Hertfordshire, with war memorial in the foreground

- Baish Almshouses, Stanstead Abbots
- Buntingford Almshouses, Buntingford
- Harrison Almshouses, Ware
- Monson Almshouses, Broxbourne
- St Mary's Almshouses, Ware
- Church Estate or Church Almshouses, Northchurch
- Bedford Almshouses (Harpur Trust), Bedford
- Bedford Almshouses, Watford
- Warners Almshouses, Hitchin
- Sayer Almshouses, High Street, Berkhamsted
- Skynner's Almshouses, Hitchin
- The Cloisters, Radcliffe Rd, Hitchin
- Wynn Almshouses, Baldock

=== Isle of Wight ===
- Hopsley's Almshouses, Crocker Street, Newport

=== Kent ===
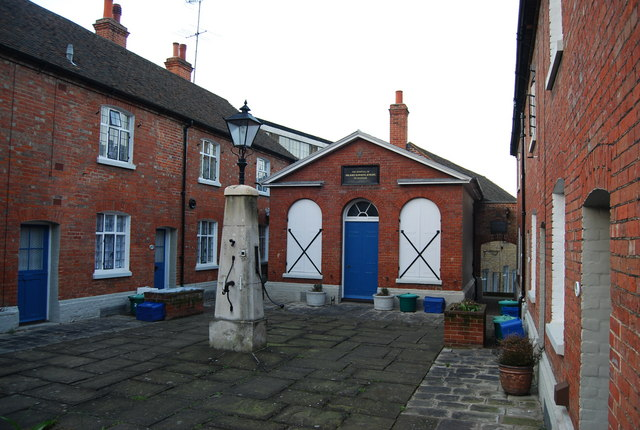
The Hospital of Sir John Hawkins, Knight, in Chatham

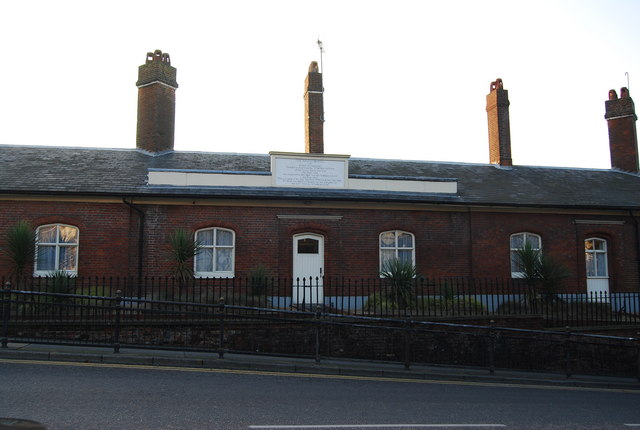
St. Catherine's Hospital, Rochester

- Charles Amherst Almshouses, Royal Tunbridge Wells
- Cutbush & Corrall Charity, Maidstone and Harrietsham
- Eastbridge Hospital of St Thomas the Martyr, Canterbury, which is Grade I listed
- Faversham Almshouses, which are Grade II-listed and are operated by the trustees of Faversham Municipal Charities
- Foord Almshouses, Borstal
- French Hospital (La Providence), Rochester (founded in 1718)
- Gartley Cottages, Dartford
- Hayward's Almshouses, Rochester
- The Hospital of Sir John Hawkins, Knight, Chatham (founded in 1594)
- John & Ann Smiths's Hospital, Canterbury
- Loam Court, Dartford
- Manwood Almshouses, Canterbury
- Municipal Charities of Dover
- Nuckell's Almshouse, St. Peters, Broadstairs
- The Retreat, Sevenoaks
- Richard Watts Almshouses, Rochester (founded 1579)
- St. Catherine's Hospital, Rochester (founded 1315)
- St John's Hospital, Northgate, Canterbury (1084)
- St. Thomas's Almshouses (Pinnocks Charity), Gravesend (founded 1624)
- Trinity Court Almshouses, Aylesford
- Twisleton Almshouses, Dartford
- New College Almshouse, Cobham, Kent (built 1362, founded by Sir John de Cobham, based on a medieval chantry, partly rebuilt 1598 and occupied by elderly of the parish)
- Wrott and Hill Charity, Sutton-at-Hone
- Wye Almhouses, Wye, Kent

=== Lancashire ===
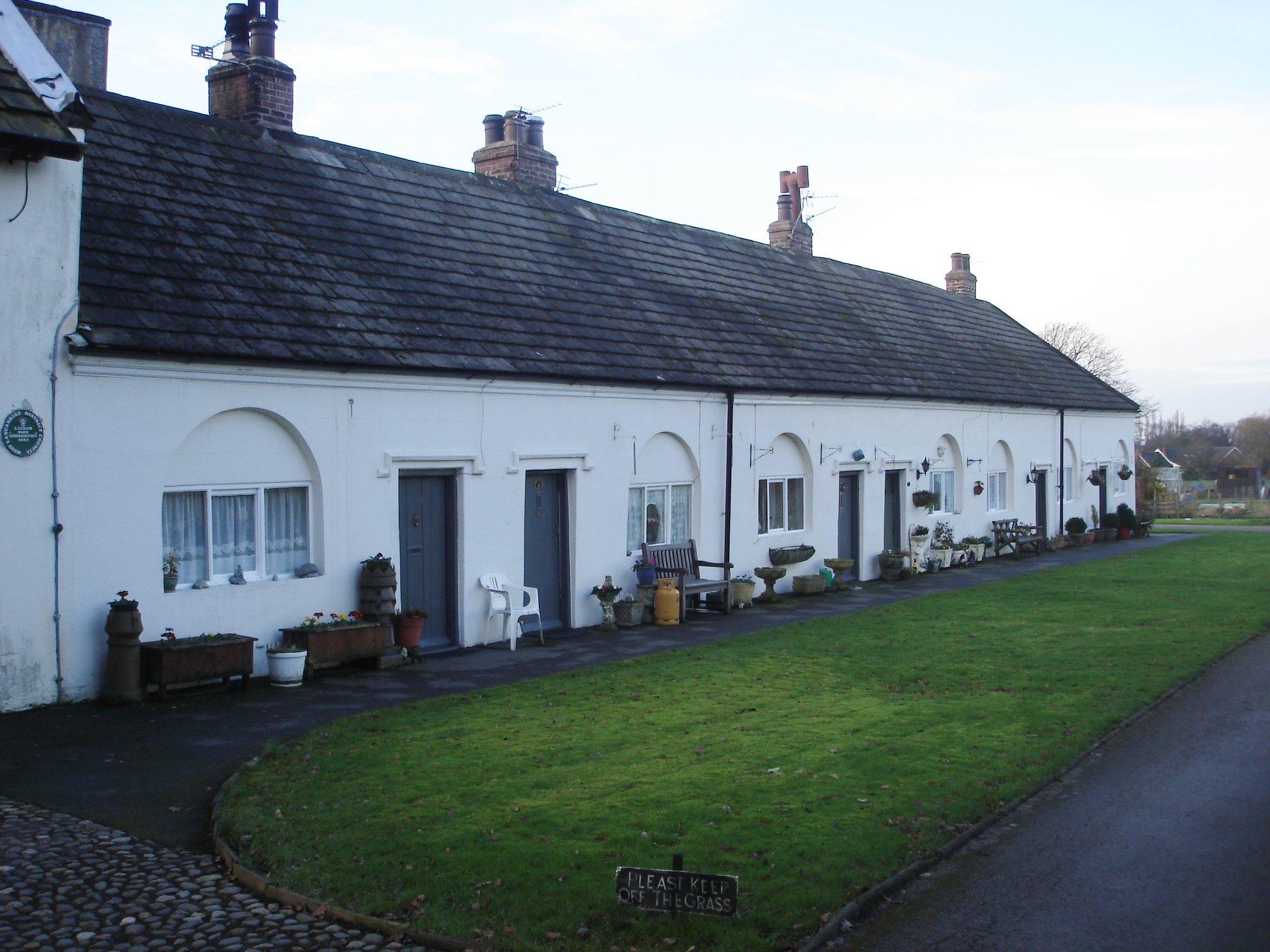
Lathom House Almshouses

- Bank Top Almshouses, Blackburn
- Hartley Homes in Laneshawbridge, Colne
- John Brabin's Almshouses, Chipping
- Lathom House Almshouses, Lathom
- Nancy Derbyshire Almshouses, Blackburn
- Stydd Almshouses, Ribchester
- The Penny Almshouses, Lancaster
- Terrace Row, Billington

=== Leicestershire ===
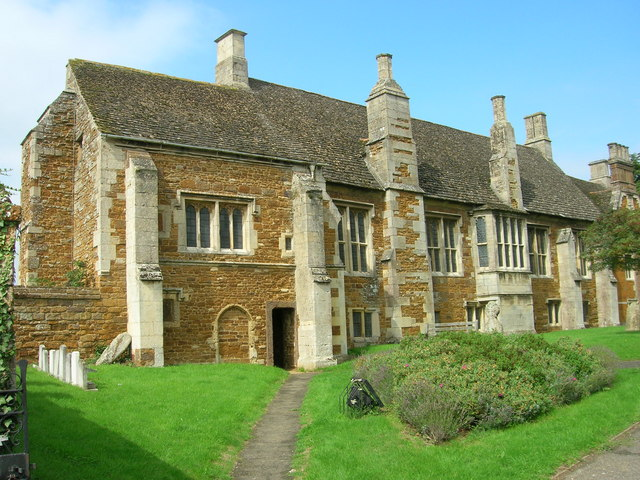
Lyddington Bede House

- Bede House (or Maison Dieu), Burton Street founded in 1640 by Robert Hudson (created a baronet by Charles II) and remodelled in 1875, Melton Mowbray
- Lyddington Bede House (originally Bishop's Palace, sold at Reformation as town house and then became a almshouse – building open and run by English Heritage), Lyddington
- Misses Moore's Almshouses, Appleby Magna, built in 1839
- Powell & Welch Almshouse Charity Bitteswell
- Ravenstone Court, Coalville
- Trinity Hospital Almshouses, The Newarke, Leicester
- Wyggeston's Hospital, Leicester see William Wyggeston

=== Lincolnshire ===
- Bede Houses, Louth
- Orme Almshouses, Louth
- Bede Houses, Tattershall
- Browne's Hospital, Stamford, founded in 1485 and now Grade II* listed
- Dawson's Almshouses, Grantham
- Fryer's Hospital, Stamford
- Lord Burghley's Almshouse, Stamford, founded 1597 to house 13 old men, one of whom was to serve as warden. Founded on site of the Medieval Hospital of St John the Baptist and St Thomas the Martyr which was founded c 1190 under Peterborough Abbey for the use of pilgrims and the poor. In disuse by the c16 when only the chapel continued in use. Bought in 1549 by William Cecil, Lord Burghley.
- St Peter's Callis, Stamford
- Snowden's Hospital, Stamford
- Truesdale's Hospital, Stamford
- Williamson's Hospital, Stamford
- Hopkin's Hospital, Stamford
- The Spalding Town Husbands, over forty properties across the town, many new-builds, run by one charitable organisation
- Long Sutton Consolidated

=== Greater London ===
==== Barnet ====
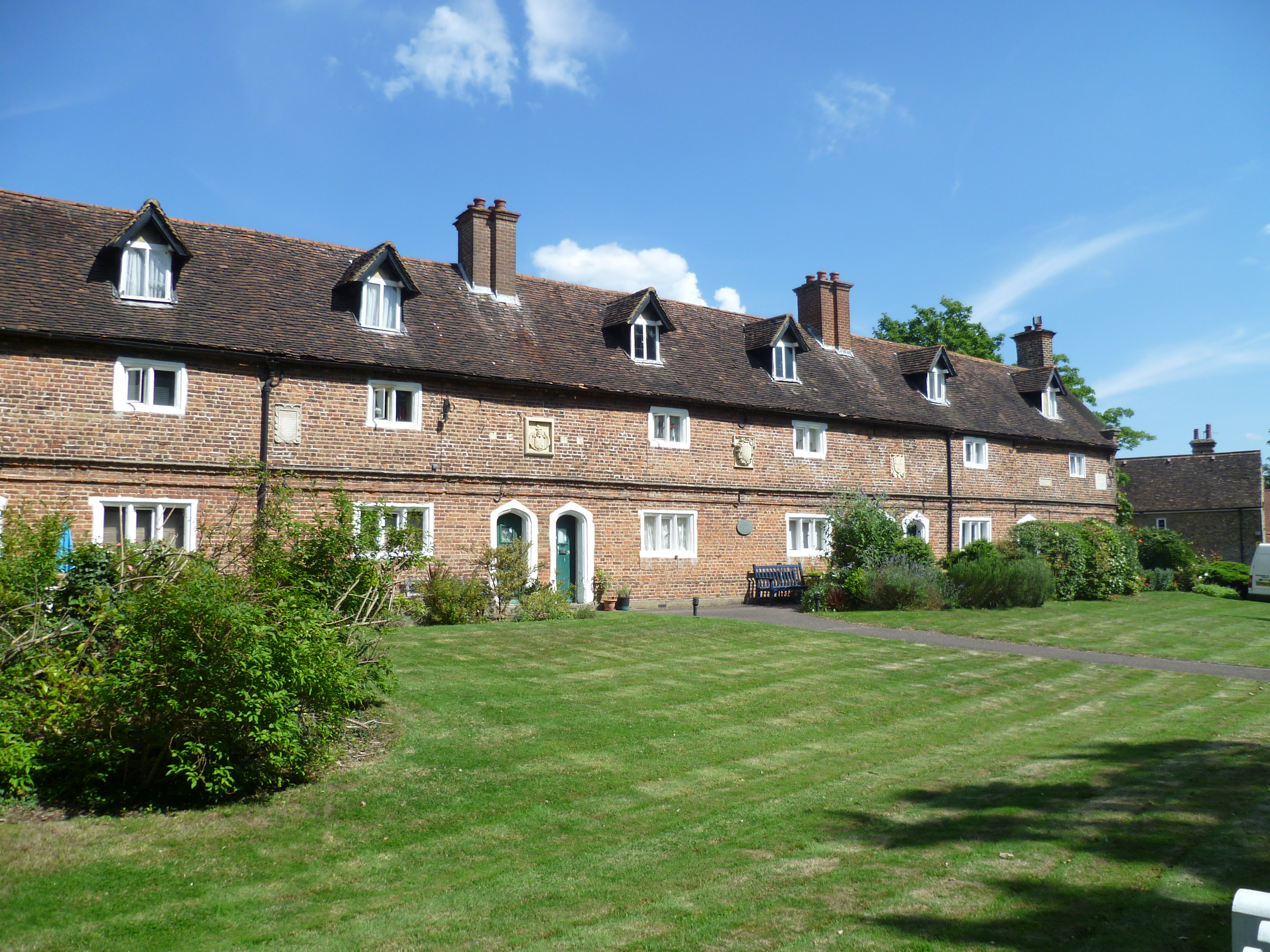
Lawrence Campe Almshouses

- Jesus Hospital is a charity administering over one hundred almshouses in the Barnet area.
- Lawrence Campe Almshouses, Whetstone, built around 1612 and funded by Lawrence Campe, a draper's merchant in the City of London
- Leathersellers' Close, Barnet set up by the Worshipful Company of Leathersellers
- Wilbraham Almshouses, Barnet (founded 1616)

==== Bexley ====
- Styleman's Almshouses (built in 1755)

==== Bromley ====
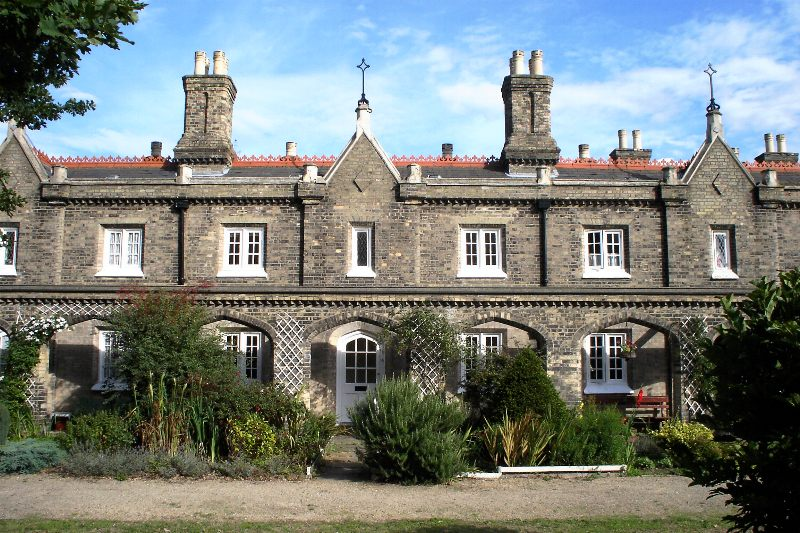
Free Watermen and Lightermen's Almshouses, Penge

- Free Watermen and Lightermen's Almshouses, also known as Royal Watermen's Almshouses, Beckenham Road / Penge High Street, Penge
- Sir Robert Geffyre Almshouses, Mottingham

==== Camden ====
- Greenwoods Almshouses, Camden
- St Giles in the Fields Almshouses, Covent Garden
- St Pancras Almshouses

==== Croydon ====
- Whitgift Almshouses, Whitgift Foundation, Croydon

==== Enfield ====
- Wright's Almshouses, Enfield

==== Greenwich ====
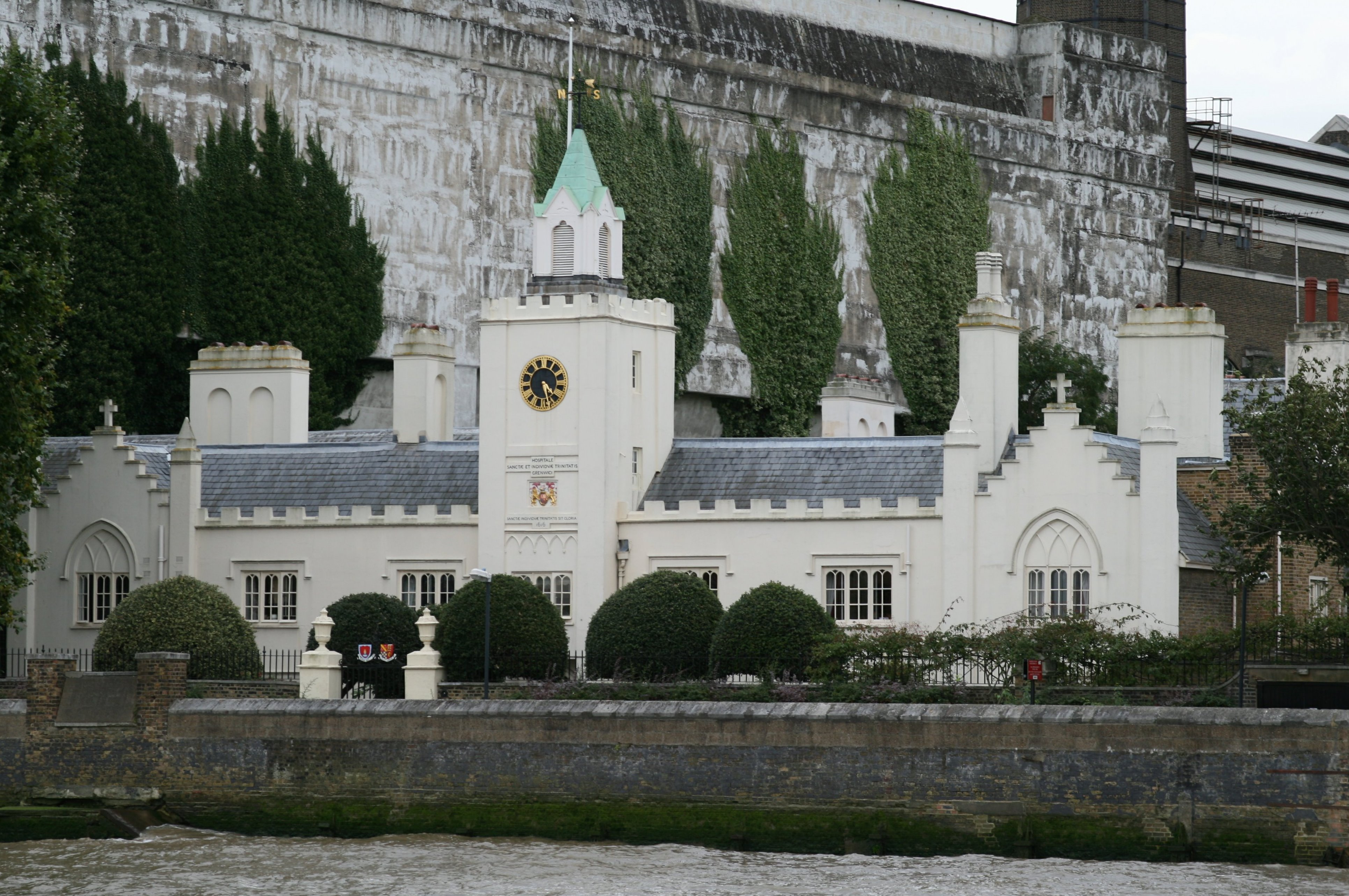
Trinity Hospital
- Penns Almshouses, South Street, Greenwich
- Thomas Philipot's Almshouses, Eltham
- Queen Elizabeth College
- Trinity Hospital almshouses in Greenwich, founded in 1613–14 by Henry Howard, 1st Earl of Northampton and rebuilt in 1812 in Gothic style. It is a Grade II* listed building.

==== Hackney ====
- former Geffrye Almshouses, Hoxton, now the Museum of the Home

==== Hammersmith and Fulham ====
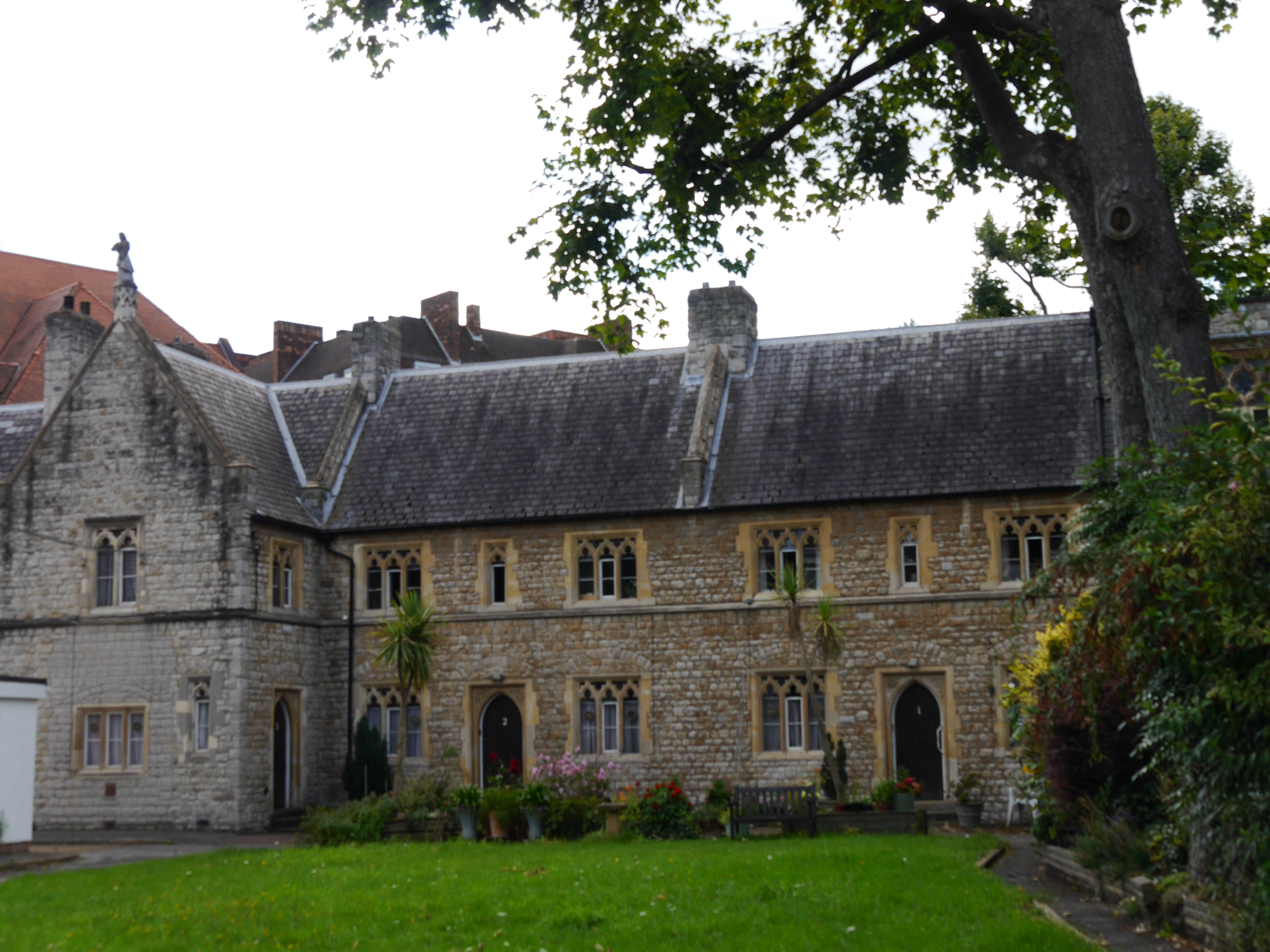
St Joseph's Almshouses, Brook Green

- Sir William Powell's Almshouses, at Church Gate, Fulham, built in 1869 and Grade II* listed
- St Joseph's Almshouses, Brook Green; built in 1851 and Grade II listed

==== Haringey ====
- Drapers' Almshouses, Bruce Grove, Tottenham
- Forster's Almshouses, Tottenham
- Fullers Almshouses, Wood Green

==== Hounslow ====
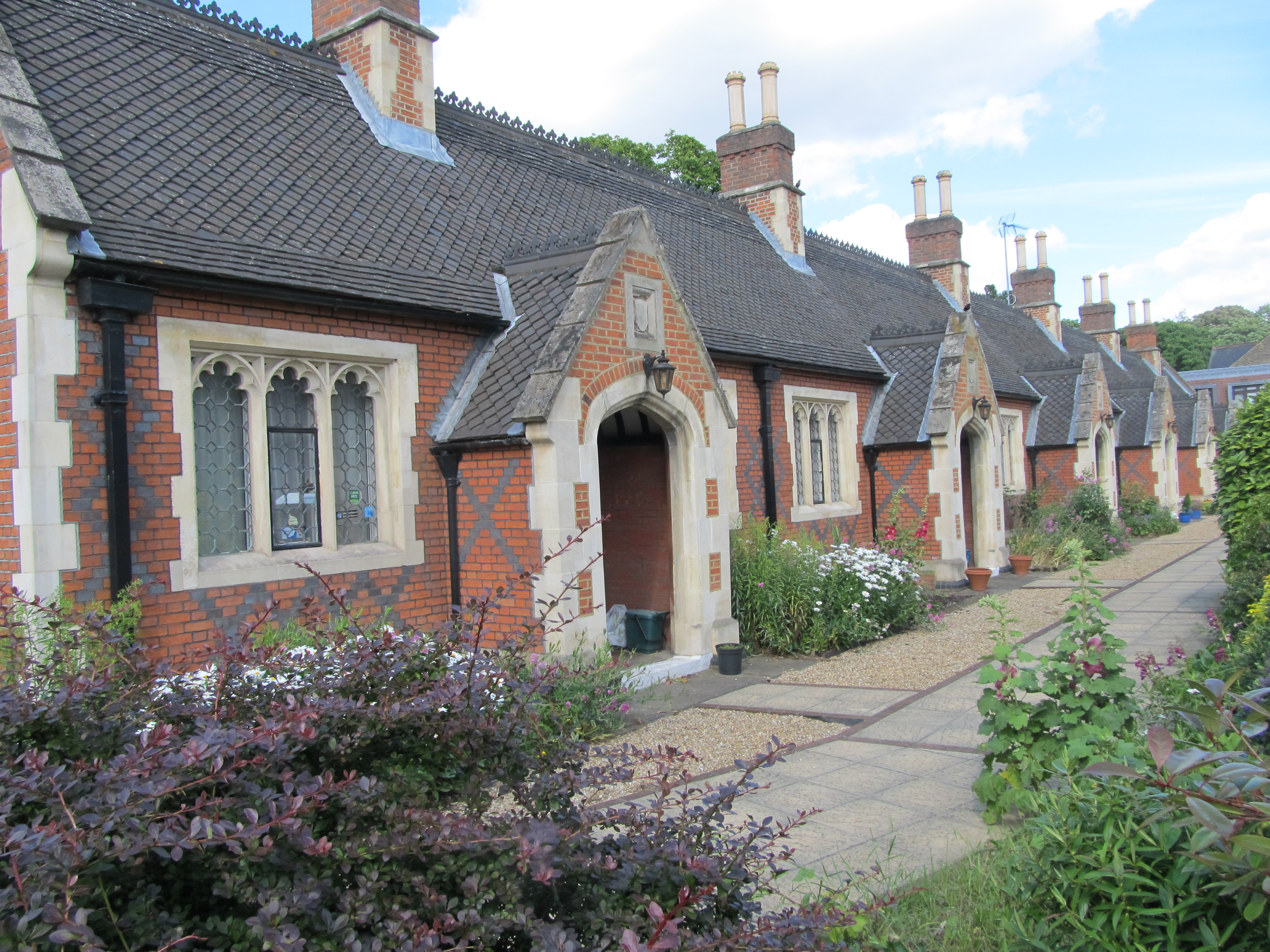
Sermon's Almshouses, Isleworth, Hounslow

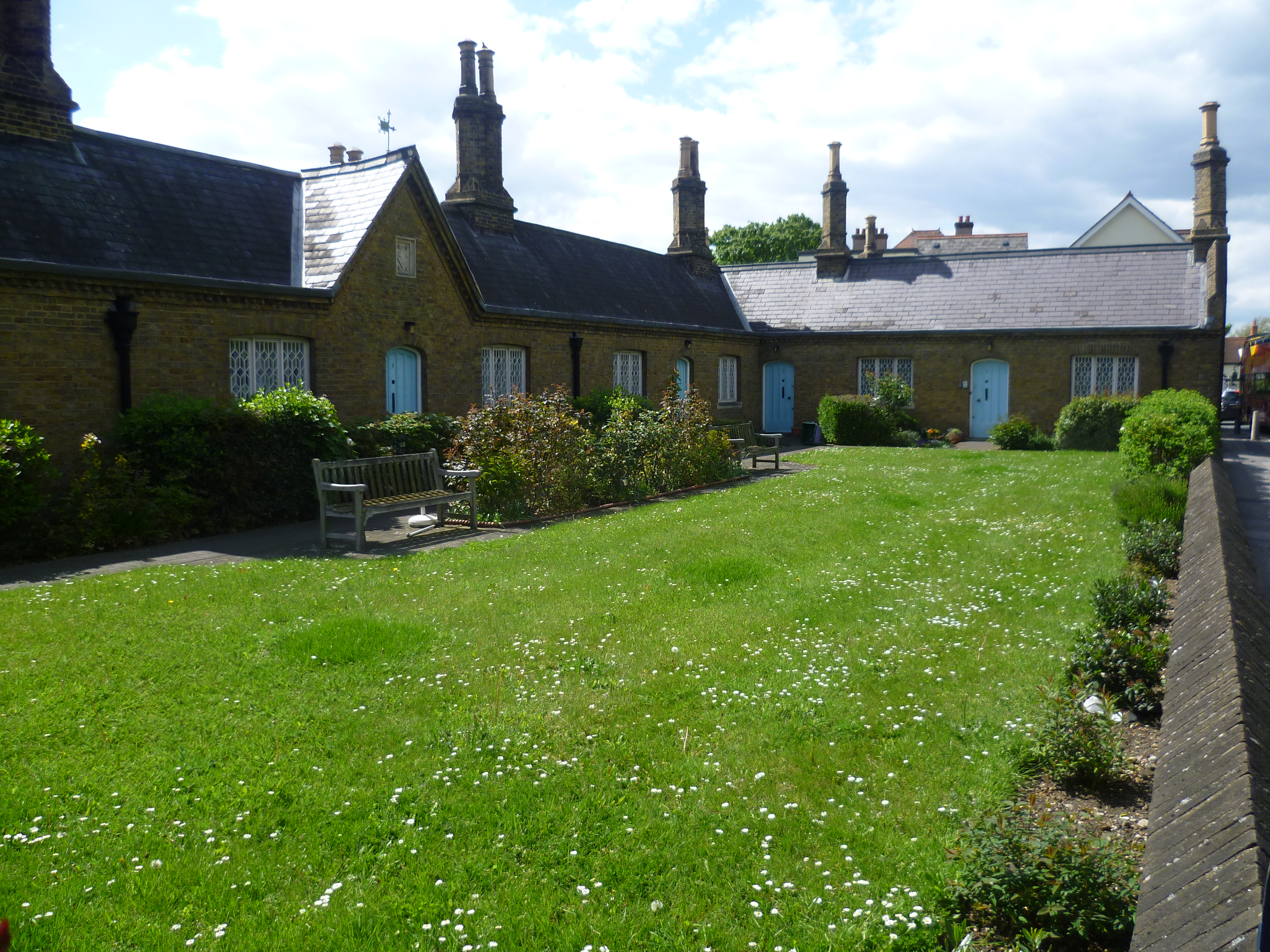
Mary Tate's Almshouses, Mitcham

- Butler's Almshouses, Byfield Road, Isleworth
- Farnell's Almshouses, St John's Road, Isleworth
- Hopkin Morris Homes of Rest, Strand-on-the-Green, Chiswick
- Ingram's Almshouses, Mill Plat, Isleworth
- Sermon's Almshouses, Twickenham Road, Isleworth

==== Islington ====
- Charterhouse (Sutton's Hospital), Clerkenwell (founded 1611)

==== Kensington and Chelsea ====
- Royal Hospital Chelsea, retirement & nursing home established in 1682 by Charles II for 300 veterans of the British Army

==== Kingston upon Thames ====
- Cleaves Almshouses, Kingston upon Thames (founded in 1550)

==== Lambeth ====
- Caron's Almshouses, Fentiman Road, SW8
- City of London Almshouses (Gresham Almshouses), Ferndale Road, Brixton
- Thrale Almshouses, Streatham
- Trinity Homes (Bailey's Almshouses), Acre Lane, Brixton

==== Lewisham ====
- Merchant Taylors' Boone's Charity, Boone's Chapel built 1683

==== Merton ====
- Mary Tate's Almshouses, Mitcham

==== Richmond upon Thames ====
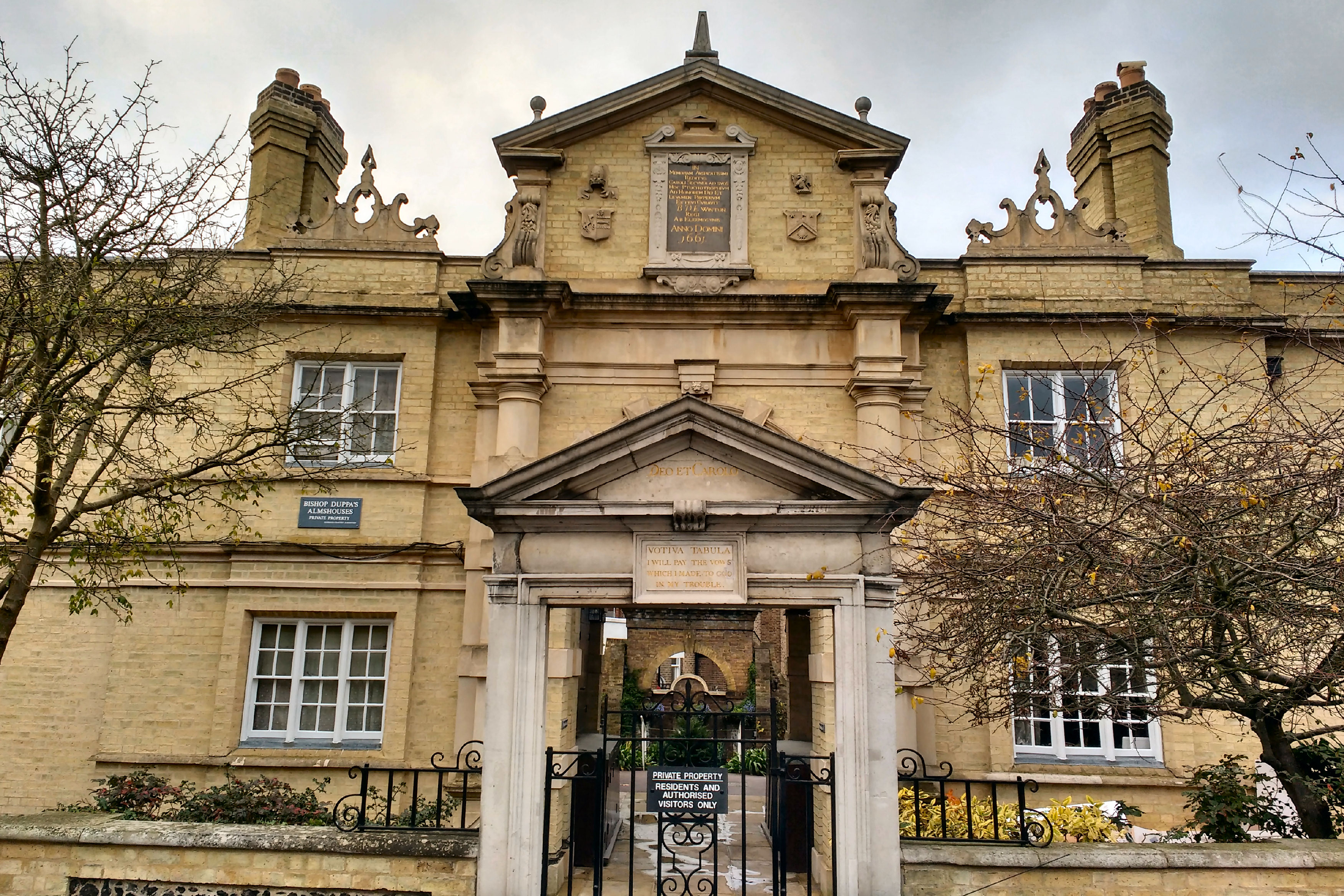
Bishop Duppa's Almshouses, Richmond

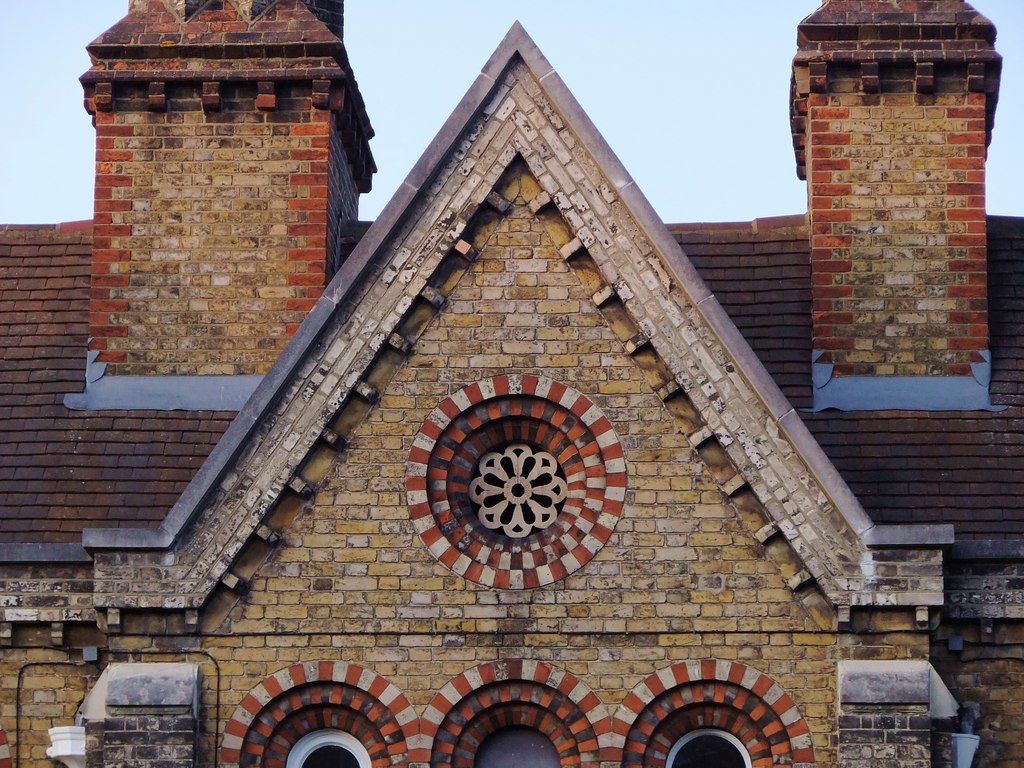
Church Estate Almshouses, Richmond

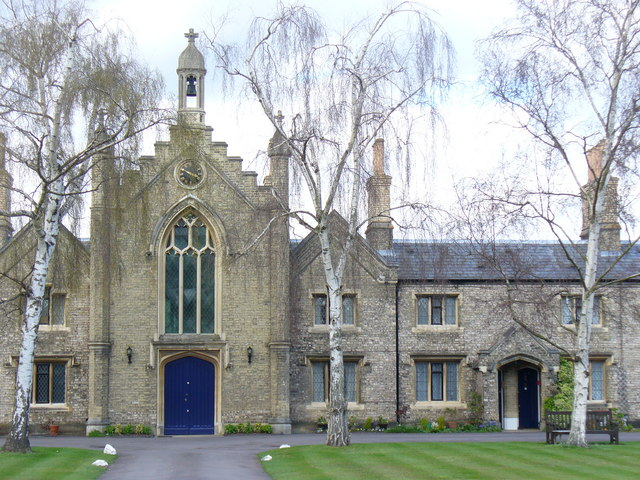
Hickey's Almshouses, Richmond

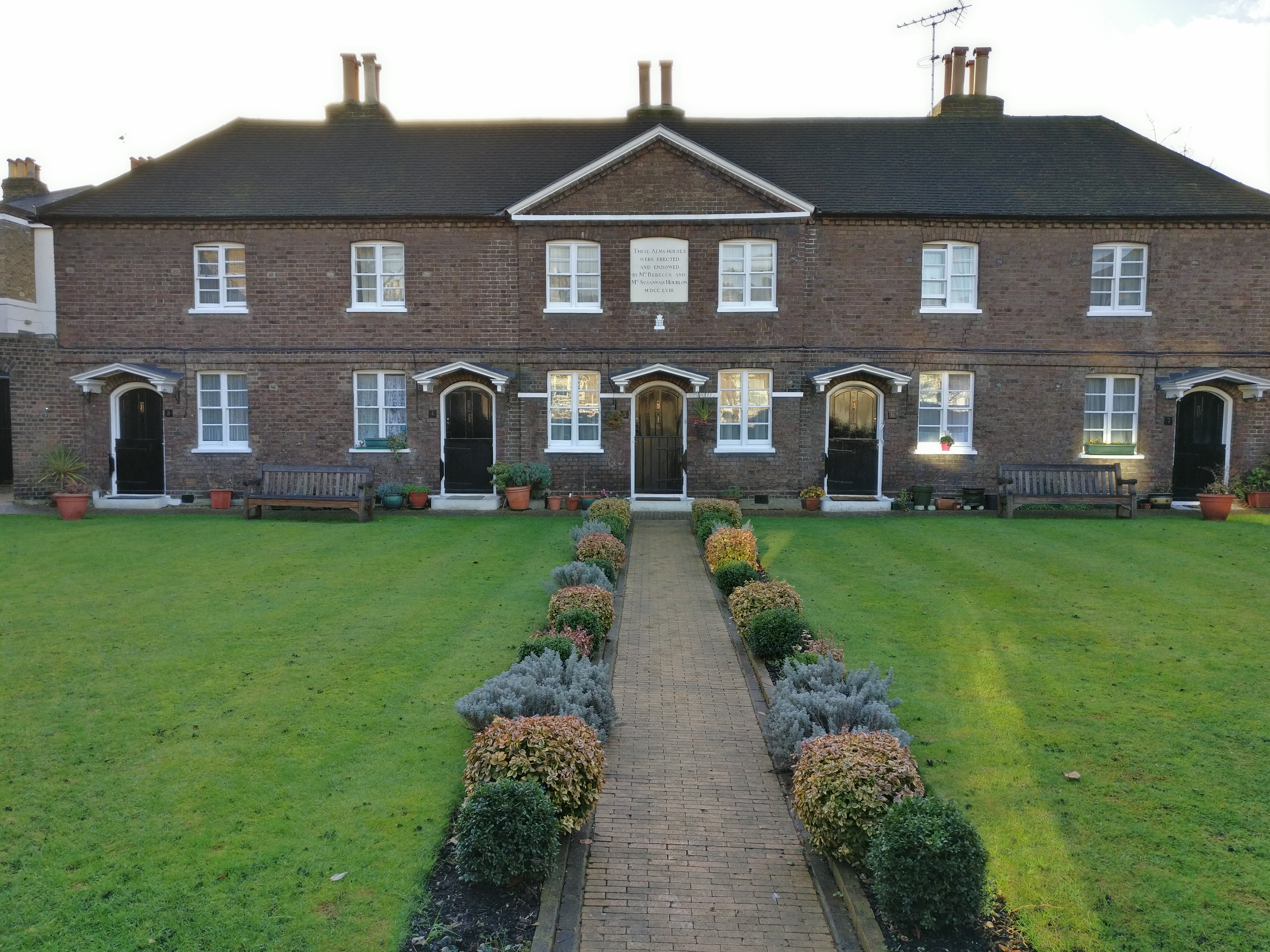
Houblon's Almshouses, Richmond

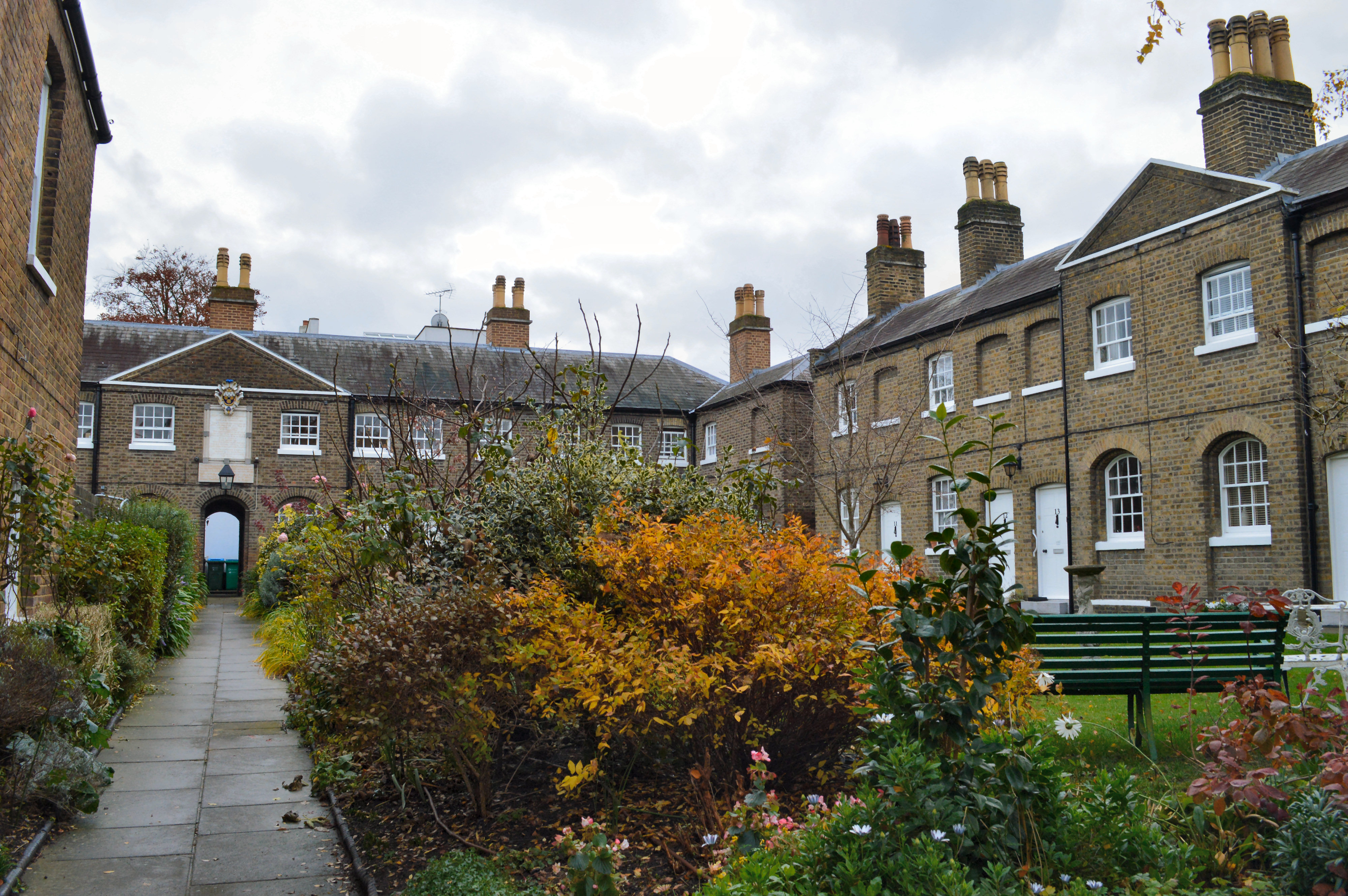
Michel's Almshouses, Richmond

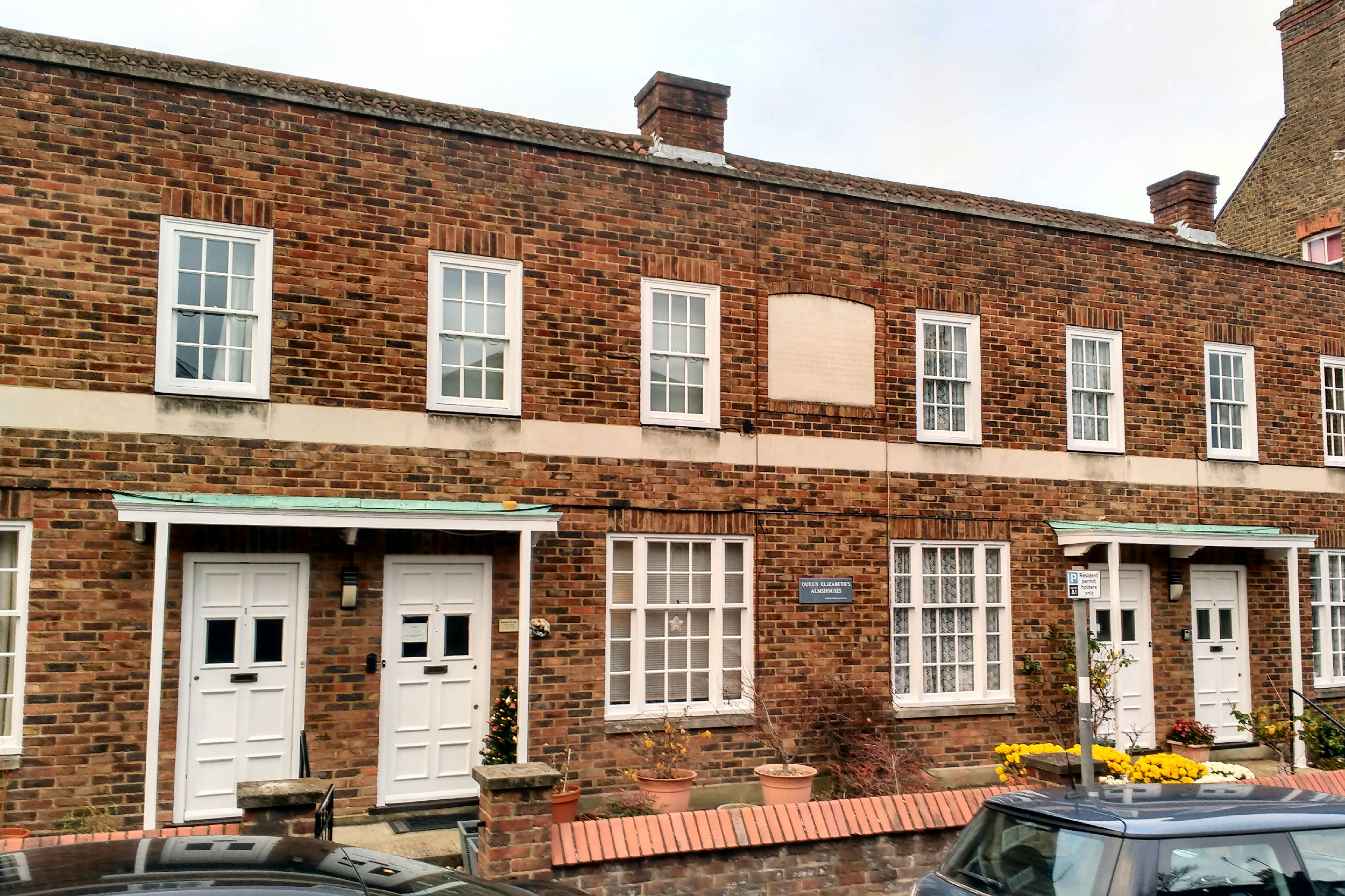
Queen Elizabeth's Almshouses, Richmond

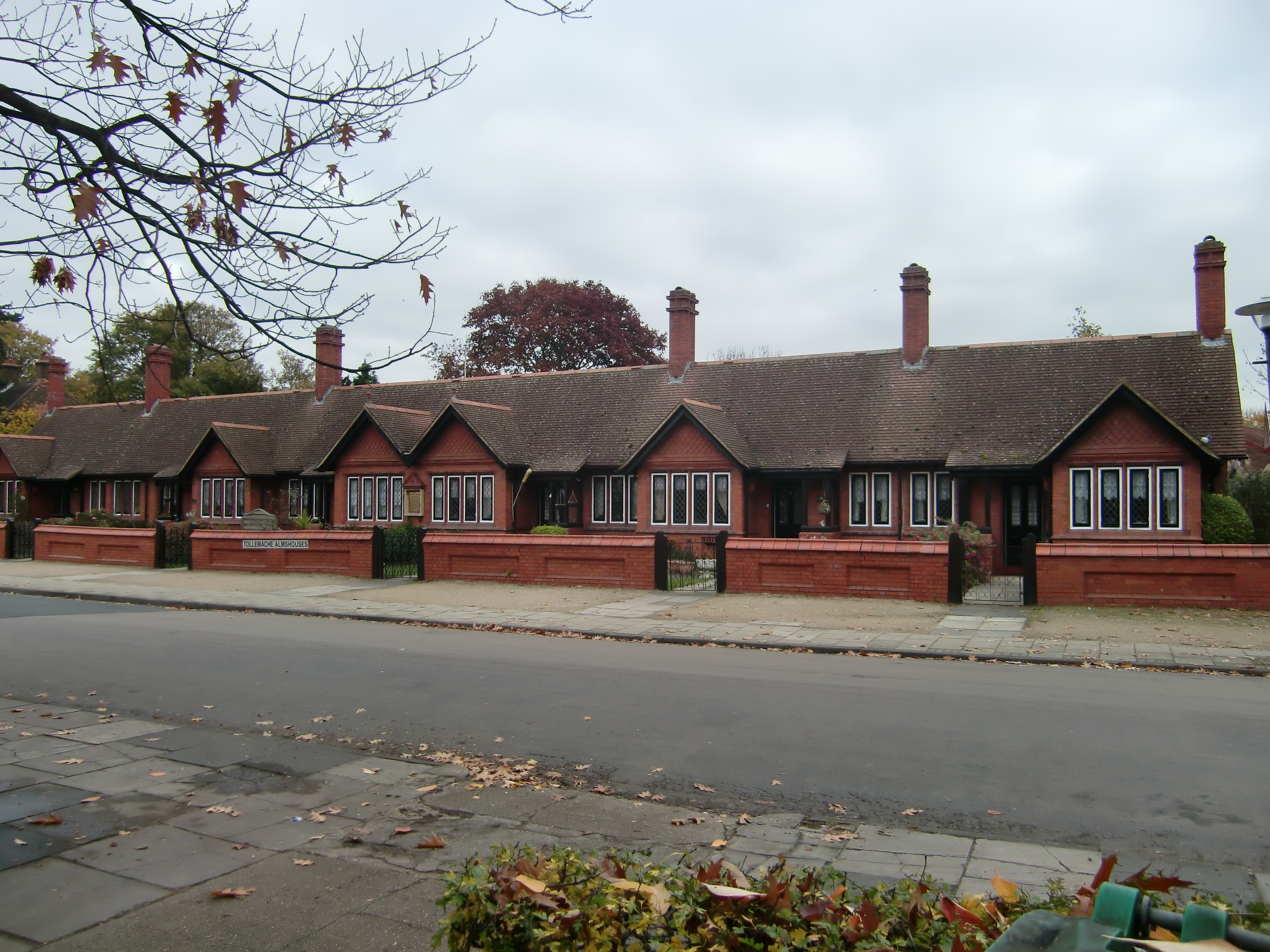
Tollemache Almshouses, Ham
- Benn's Walk, Richmond, now with five almshouses, built in 1983. They were built on the site of Benn's Cottages, which had been developed on land endowed by William Smithet in 1727 to the charity that was then administering Michel's Almshouses.
- Bishop Duppa's Almshouses, Richmond, founded by Brian Duppa, Bishop of Winchester, in 1661 and now Grade II listed.
- Candler Almshouses, Twickenham were built in 1936 and are named after William Candler, a local grocer who left money to build them.
- Christchurch Road Almshouses in East Sheen were built in 1927 and were funded by bequests from the 18th and 19th centuries.
- Church Estate Almshouses, Richmond; Grade II listed. Most of the buildings date from 1843 but the charity that built them is known to have existed in Queen Elizabeth I's time and may have much earlier origins.
- Elizabeth Doughty Almshouses (with 12 flats) opened on Grove Road (on the corner of Queen's Road) in 2025.
- Elizabeth Twining Almshouses, Richmond, opened in 2024.
- Hickey's Almshouses, Richmond. Twenty almshouses, built in 1834, are Grade II* listed. A later block of almshouses, built in 1851 in the same style, is listed at Grade II.
- Houblon's Almshouses, Richmond; Grade II* listed. The oldest almshouses were built in 1757; a further two almshouses were built in 1857.
- Juxon's Almshouses in East Sheen were built in 1911, funded by a bequest in 1626 from John Juxon.
- 10–18 Manning Place, Richmond. The property was built in 1993 and was purchased in 2017 by The Richmond Charities for use as almshouses.
- Michel's Almshouses, Richmond; Grade II listed. The original ten almshouses were built in 1696 and were rebuilt in 1811. Another six almshouses were added in 1858.
- Queen Elizabeth's Almshouses, Richmond, founded in 1600. They were rebuilt in 1767 and again in 1857. They were damaged during World War II and replaced with four newly built houses in 1955.
- Tollemache Almshouses, Ham, founded in 1892.
- Wright's Almshouses, Twickenham, were built in the second decade of the 21st century.

==== Southwark ====
- Appleby Blue Almshouse, Bermondsey
- Edward Allyn's Almshouses, Old College, Dulwich
- Hopton's Almshouses, Bankside, built in 1746–49 and now Grade II* listed
- former Drapers Almshouses, Glasshill Street
- Walter's Close, Brandon Street

==== Tower Hamlets ====
- George Green's Almshouses, Poplar
- Lady Mico's Almshouses, Stepney
- Norton Folgate Almshouses, Spitalfields
- Shipwright's Almshouses, Cubitt Town
- Trinity Green Almshouses, Mile End, built in 1695, and now Grade I listed

==== Wandsworth ====
- Abraham Dawes Almshouses, Putney
- Dovedale Cottages, Battersea
- St Clement Danes Holborn Estate Almshouses and Chapel, Tooting

==== Westminster ====
- Westminster Almshouses, Rochester Row

=== Norfolk ===
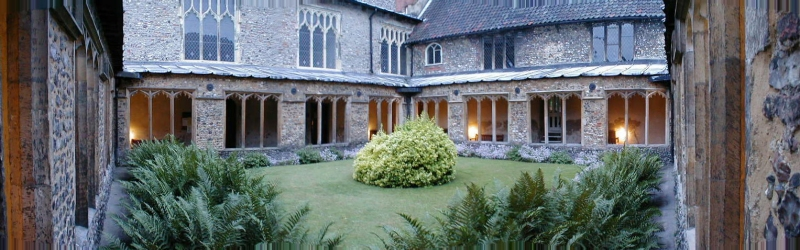
Great Hospital, Norwich

- Fulmerston's Almshouses, Thetford
- Great Hospital, Norwich (founded 1249)
- Trinity Hospital, Castle Rising, King's Lynn

=== Northamptonshire ===
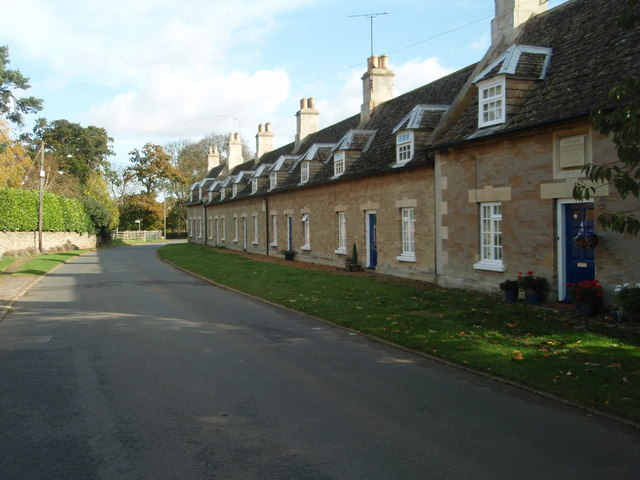
Almshouses, Titchmarsh

- Almshouses, Church Brampton (built in 1854 by Earl Spencer in memory of his parents, for six poor widows)
- Bede House, Higham Ferrers (built in 1423 by Archbishop Henry Chichele, for 12 men and one woman to look after them)
- Sawyers Almshouses, Sheep Street, Kettering (built in 1688)
- Raynesford Almshouses, 1–4 Church Street, Dallington, Northampton (founded 1673 by Richard Raynsford, a lawyer who became Chief Justice of the King's Bench under Charles II and lived at the manor house, buried in the church,)
- Jesus Hospital, Hospital Hill (off Market Square), Rothwell (built in 1593 by Owen Ragsdale, schoolmaster of the grammar school (which was on the site of the library and closed in the 1970s), for 24 Almsmen and a Principal, still an almshouse but with 2 three storey extensions built in 1830s. The original building now has four larger flats, the extensions have six small flats, there is also a Warden's house (late c18) and opposite the Matron's cottage (1840) which is rented out. The trust also owns the adjoining building, Home Farm, and the car park area outside which adjoins Market Square)
- Ponder's Almshouses, possibly the row of six houses on Glendon Road, opposite Ponder Street or where the bungalows on Ponder Street are now, Rothwell, Northamptonshire – 6 small tenements erected in or about 1714 by Thomas Ponder and three roods of land adjoining for poor widows of Rothwell
- Almshouses, Wellingborough Road, Rushden (built in 1883 in memory of Frederick Maitland Sartoris by his father)
- Pickering Hospital, 6 cottages erected and endowed for support of 8 poor persons with preference for spinsters or widows Almshouses, Titchmarsh (dating from 1756)
- former Montague Hospital, Stamford Road, Weekley (dated 1611: now a private house, used as Mr Collin's Vicarage in Keira Knightley's Film "Pride & Prejudice")
- Almshouses, Creaton (dating from 1825 and rebuilt in 1897)
- The Hospital of St John Baptist and St John Evangelist (aka St John's Hospital), Bridge Street, Northampton (founded circa 1140), sold in 1870 to a Mr Mullinger who gave it to Roman Catholic Church. Refounded 1876 at Weston Favell as a convalescent hospital and is now a restaurant.
- St Thomas' Hospital Building, 74 St Giles Street, Northampton (founded 1450), on site of what is currently the Plough Hotel, for 12 poor people. In 1654 Sir John Langham funded an additional 6 people and Richard Massingberd another 1. Building abandoned 1834, demolished in 1874 during road widening for the new cattle market and its residents moved to a new building on St Giles Street. The new almshouse with distinctive castellations and stucco 2 storey front built in 1834. In addition is plaque remembering the important charity own, and still own, the whole block above 39 St Giles Street.
- 1–6 Crick Road, West Haddon (built 1870 for retired people from West Haddon)
- Parson Latham's Hospital in Oundle. Established in the 1600s by Parson Nicholas Latham. Situated on North Street in Oundle. Houses up to 14 ladies from within the Parishes of Oundle and Polebrook. 8 flats within the Grade II listed main building and 6 further new built bungalows in the grounds. Educational Grants are given annually to students from the Parish of Oundle and Polebrook.

=== Nottinghamshire ===
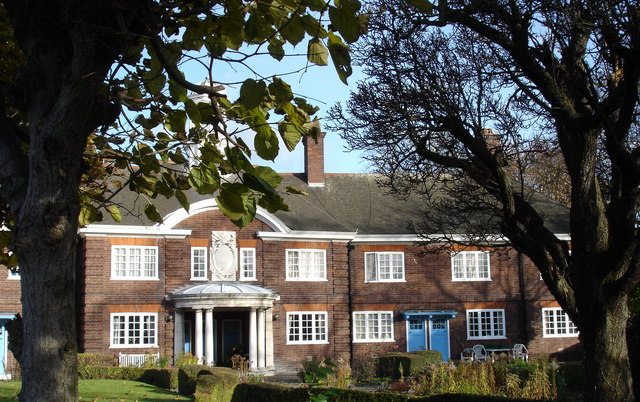
Albert Ball Memorial Homes

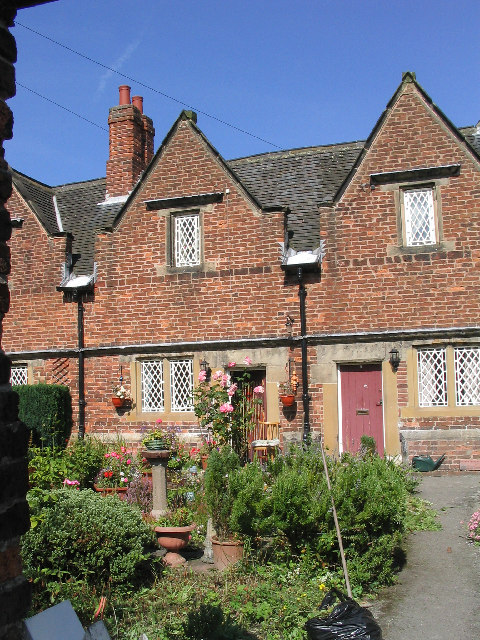
Willoughby Almshouses, Cossall

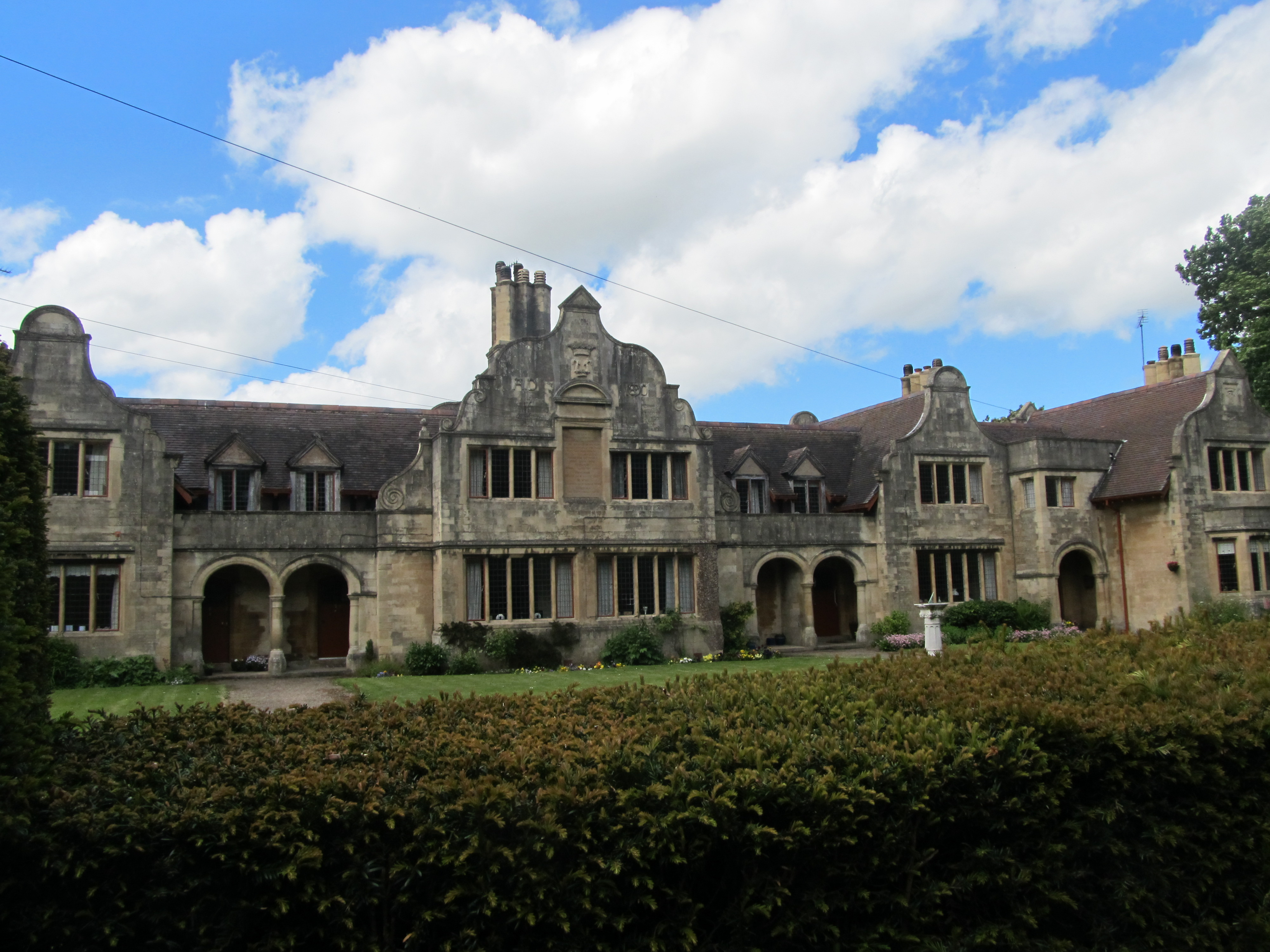
Winnings Almshouses, Welbeck Abbey, Worksop

- Albert Ball Memorial Homes, Lenton, Nottingham, erected in 1922 and Grade-II listed in 1995
- Old School and Almshouses, Bunny (built in 1700)
- Almshouses, Main Street, Grove
- Almshouses, Perlethorpe cum Budby (built c. 1890)
- Almshouses, West Bridgford
- Dorothy Boot Homes, Wilford, Nottingham
- The United Charities of Abel Collin, Beeston
- The Brunts Charity, Toothill Lane/Leeming Street, Mansfield
- Frances Longden Almshouses, Bramcote, erected in 1852 in Bramcote, Nottinghamshire for four poor women; they are now run by Nottingham Community Housing Association
- Willoughby Almshouses, Cossall: erected in 1685
- Sloswicke's Hospital, Churchgate, East Retford
- Holy Trinity Hospital, Hospital Road, West Retford
- Heath's Hospital, Mansfield
- Plumptre Hospital, Nottingham (founded in 1392)
- Canning Terrace, Canning Circus, Nottingham
- William Woodsend Memorial Homes, Nottingham, erected in 1912–13 and now run by the Nottingham Community Housing Association
- Miss Cullen's Almshouses, Carrington, Nottingham
- George Wills Almshouses, Clifton, Nottingham
- Daybrook Almshouses, Arnold, Nottingham
- Mary Hardstaff Homes, Gedling, Nottingham
- Norris Almshouses, Sherwood, Nottingham, which are now managed by Nottingham Community Housing Association
- Winnings Almshouses, Welbeck Abbey, Worksop

=== Oxfordshire ===
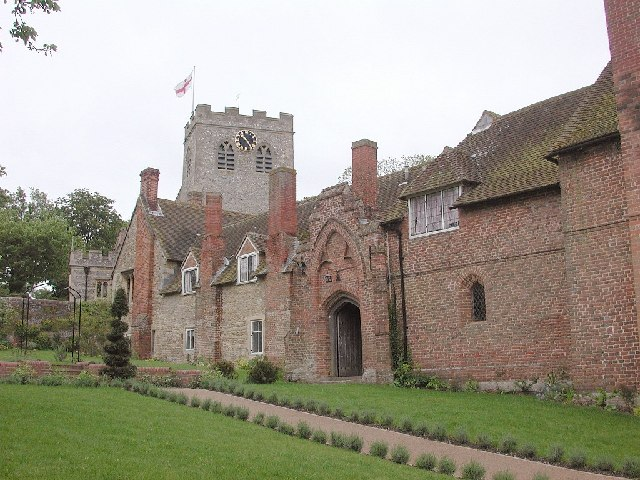
Ewelme almshouses

- Angier's Almshouses, Wallingford
- Almshouse of Robert Stiles, Wantage
- Bread & Beef Almshouses, Witney
- Castle's Almshouses, Guildenford
- Christ's Hospital, Abingdon
- Drayton Almshouses, Drayton
- Ewelme Hospital
- Francis Elderfield's Almshouses, Sutton Courtenay
- Geering's Alsmhouses, Harwell
- Goring Heath Almshouses, Goring Heath
- Holloway's Almshouses, Witney
- Longland Almshouses, Henley-on-Thames
- Newberry Almshouses, Henley-on-Thames
- Dr. Radcliffe's Almhouses, Steeple Aston
- Stones Court, City of Oxford
- Tomkins Almshouses, Abingdon
- Town Lands Of Wantage, Wantage
- Twitty's Almshouses, Abingdon
- Warwick Almshouses, Burford

=== Shropshire ===
- Almshouses, Sheinston Street, Much Wenlock
- Cludde Almshouses, 12 The Avenue, Wrockwardine (now private houses)
- Ercall Magna Almshouses, Shrewsbury Road, Ercall Magna
- Foxes Almshouses and Hosier's Almshouses, together managed as Hoysers in Ludlow
- Mercers' Almshouses, Shrewsbury
- Millington's Hospital, Shrewsbury, architect John Hiram Haycock
- St Leonard's, Bridgnorth
- Shrewsbury Drapers Company almshouses, Shrewsbury
- Town Almshouses, Newport
- Weston Park Almshouses, Weston Park, Weston-under-Lizard

=== Somerset ===
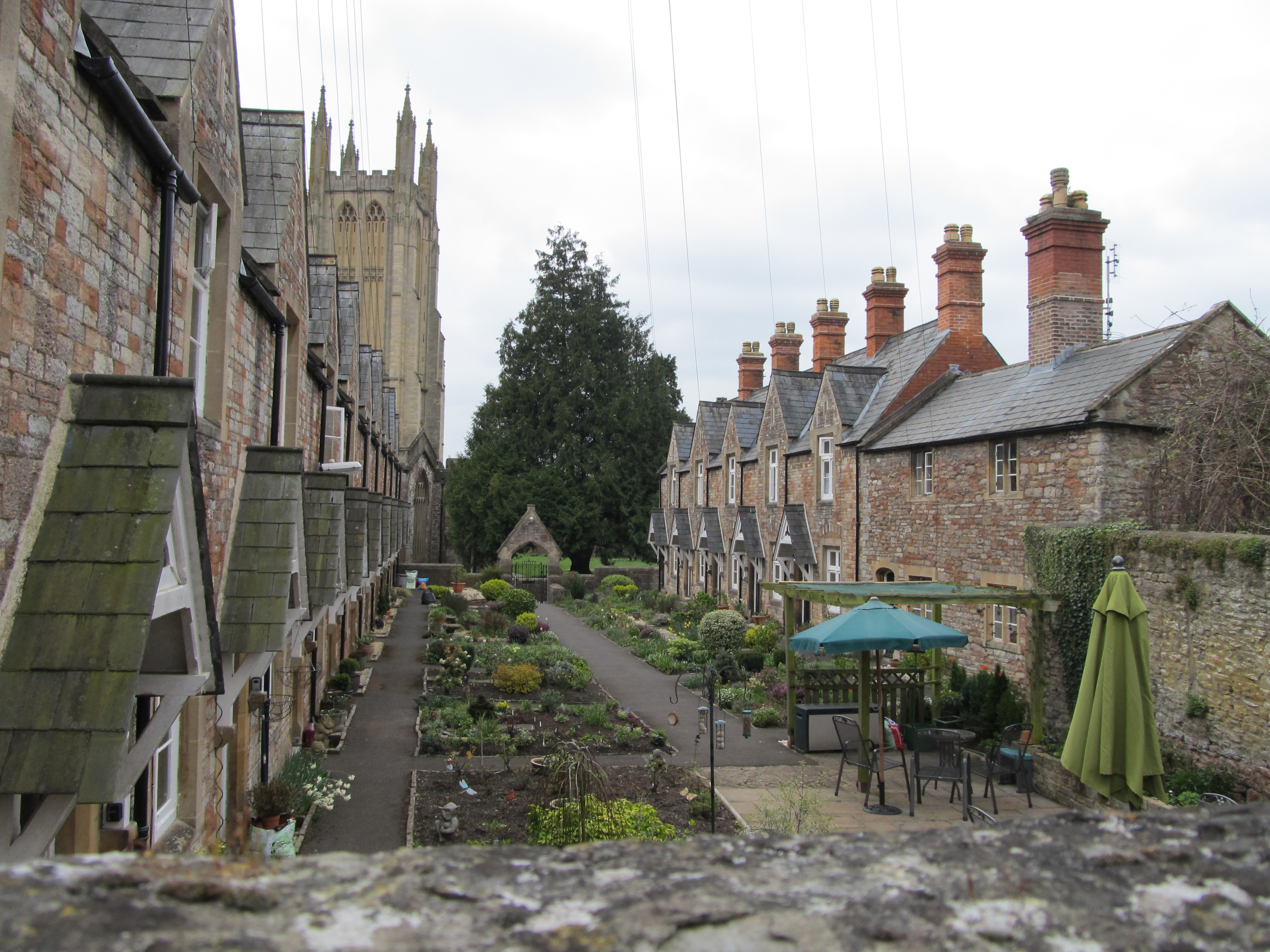
City of Wells Almshouses, Priest Row

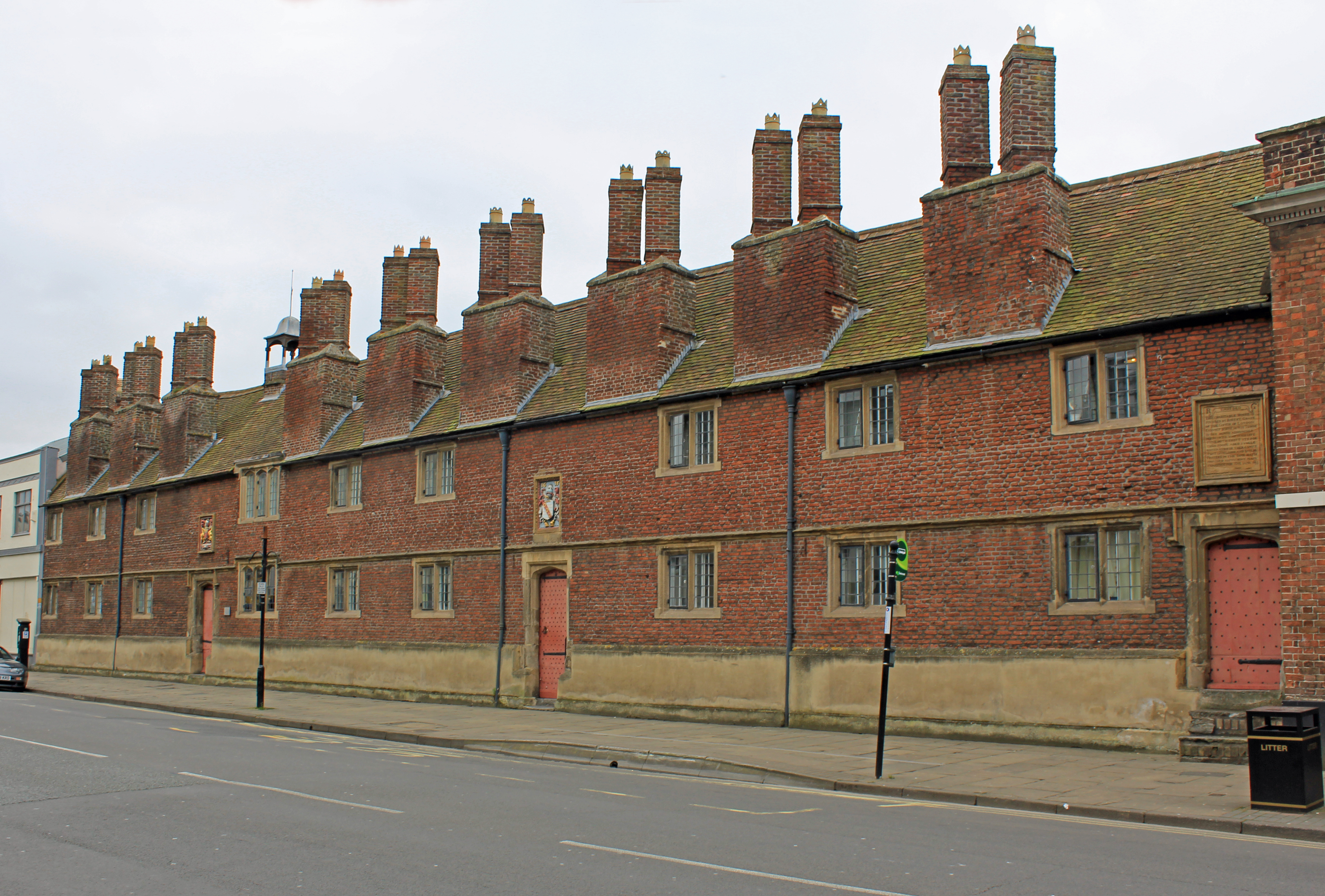
Grays Almshouses, Taunton

- Almshouses, Midsomer Norton
- Almshouses, Minehead
- Almshouses, Shepton Mallet
- Almshouses, Worle
- Blue House, Frome, built in 1726 and Grade I listed
- Bridges Almshouses, Keynsham
- City of Wells Almshouses, Priest Row, Wells
- Gray's Almshouses, Taunton, which are Grade I listed
- Helyar Almshouses, East Coker, erected between 1640 and 1660 and now Grade II listed
- Milward Almshouses, Keynsham
- Old Almshouse, Axbridge
- Partis College, Bath, built as large block of almshouses between 1825 and 1827, now Grade I listed
- Sexey's Hospital, Bruton, built around 1630. The West Wing and chapel are Grade I listed. The East Wing and gateway are Grade II listed.
- St John's Hospital, Bath, which is Grade I listed
- St Margaret's Almshouses, Taunton
- William Portman Almshouses, Staple Fitzpaine, which are Grade II* listed
- Woborn Almshouses, Yeovil

=== Staffordshire ===
- Almshouses, Manor Road, Kings Bromley
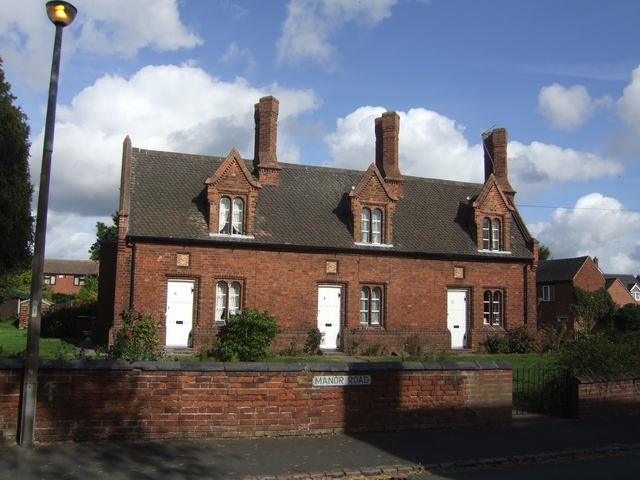
  Almshouses, Kings Bromley
- Ash Almshouses, also called Joliffe Almshouses, Broad Street/Compton, Leek
- Bagot Almshouses, Bagot Street, Abbots Bromley
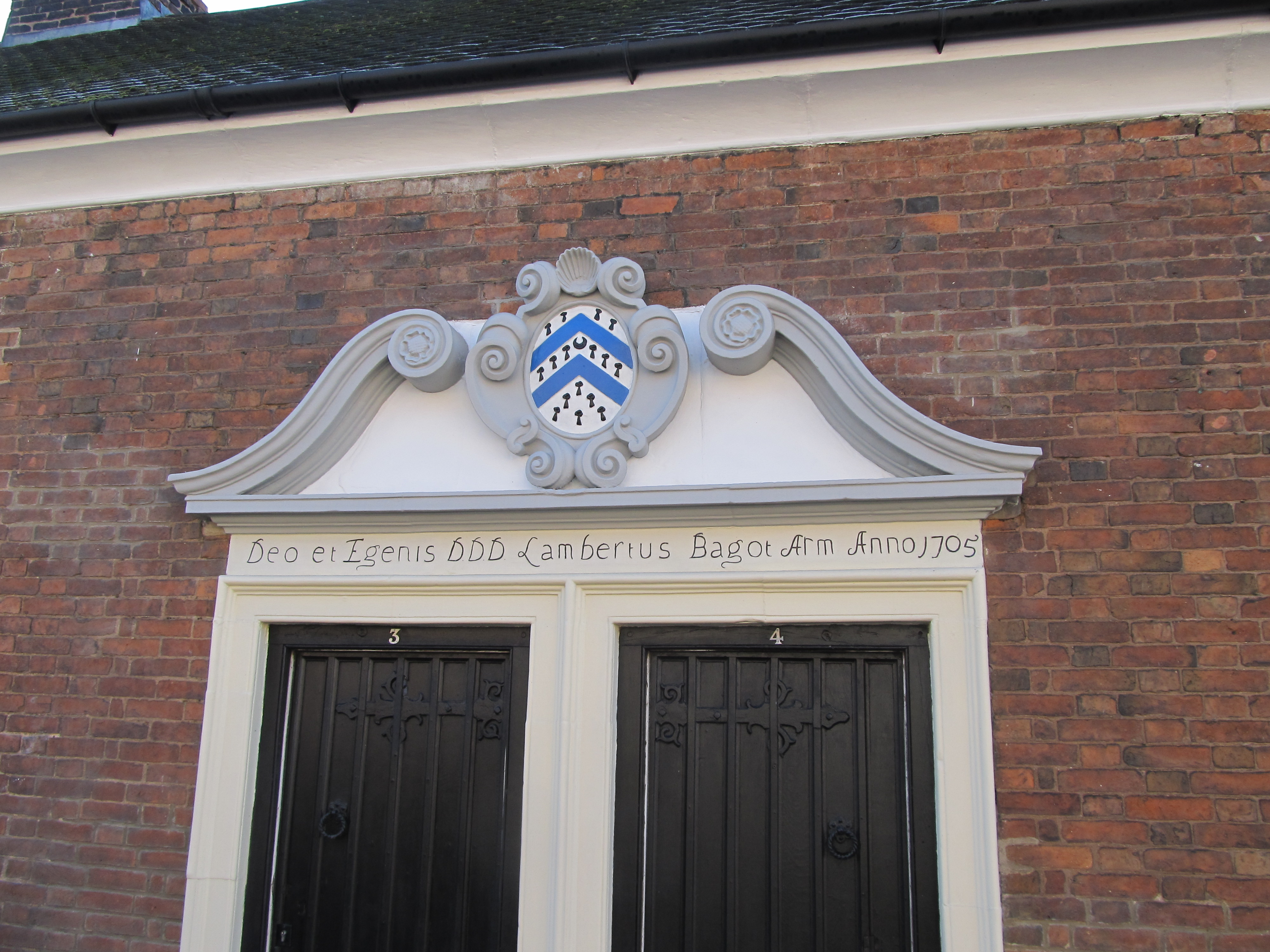
  Bagot Almshouses, Abbots Bromley
- Condlyffe Almshouses, Condlyffe Road, Leek
- Dame Paulet's Almshouses, Burton upon Trent
- Dr Milley's Hospital, Lichfield
- Thomas Guy's Almshouses, Tamworth
- Hospital of St John Baptist without the Barrs, Lichfield
- Sir Martin Noel's Almshouses, Mill Street, Stafford (founded in 1660)
- Walter Holdnall Almshouses, Kinver

=== Suffolk ===
- The Downs Almshouses, Stoke-by-Nayland
- Dreyer Almshouses, Bungay
- The Almshouse, Wickhambrook
- Tooley's and Smart's Almshouses, Ipswich
- The Guildhall Feoffment Trust, Bury St Edmunds
- Trinity Hospital, Long Melford
- Almshouses, Peasonhall (built as one house in C16, converted into almshouses in 1891)
- Margaret Ogilvie Almshouses, Thorpeness
- Seckford Care, Woodbridge, Suffolk

=== Surrey ===
- Abbot's Hospital, Guildford, founded in 1619 and now Grade I listed
- St Mary's Almshouses, Godstone, founded 1872
- The College of St Barnabas, Lingfield, founded 1895
- The Victoria Almshouses, Reigate & Redhill
- Whiteley Village, Walton on Thames
- Windsor Almshouses, Farnham, built 1619

=== Sussex ===
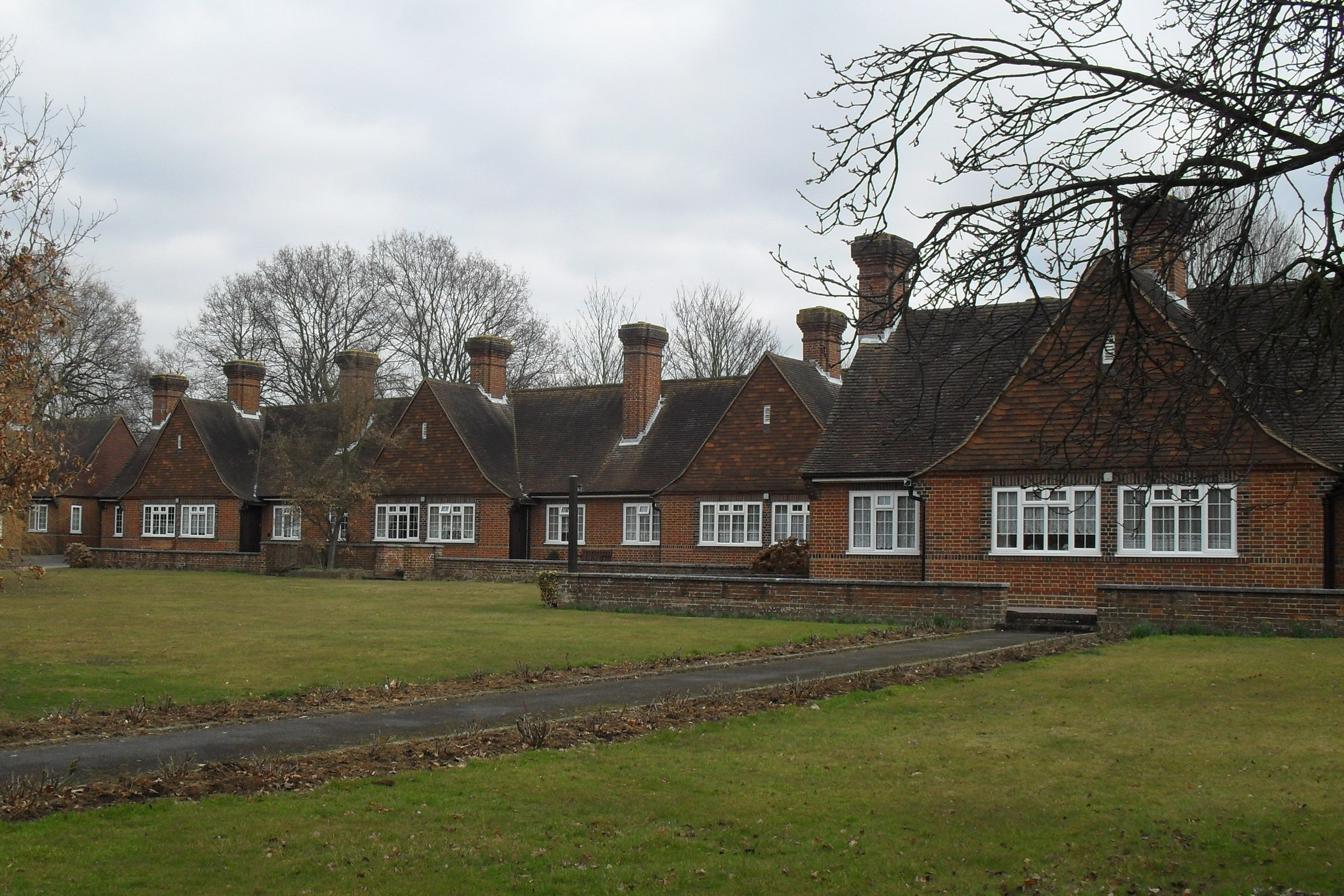
Dyers Almshouses, Crawley

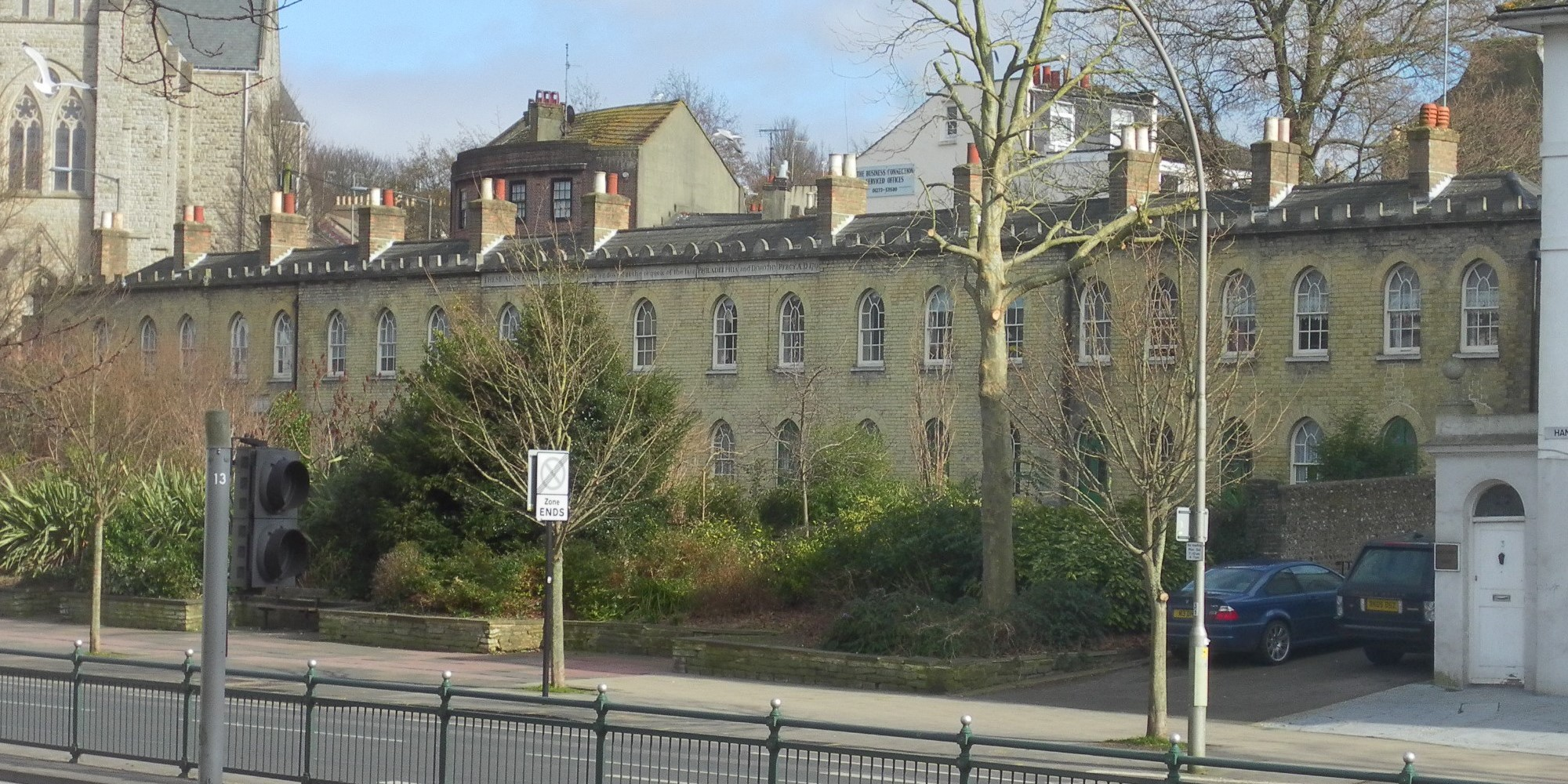
Percy and Wagner Almshouses, Brighton

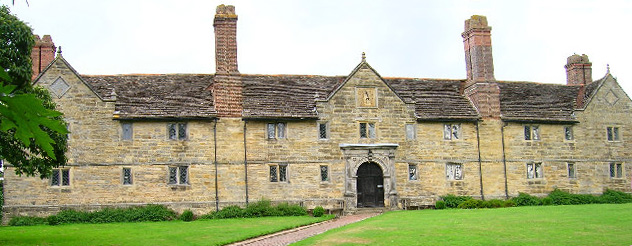
Sackville College, East Grinstead, from the high street

==== East Sussex ====
- Percy and Wagner Almshouses, 1–12 Lewes Road, Hanover, Brighton; dating from 1795 and now Grade II listed
- Watermen and Lightermen of the River Thames Almhouses, St Leonard's-on-Sea, Hastings

==== West Sussex ====
- Dyers Almshouses, Crawley (built 1939–40, 1952 and 1971)
- Sackville College, East Grinstead, built in 1609 and now Grade I listed
- Humphrys Almshouses, Humphrys Road, Worthing

=== Warwickshire ===
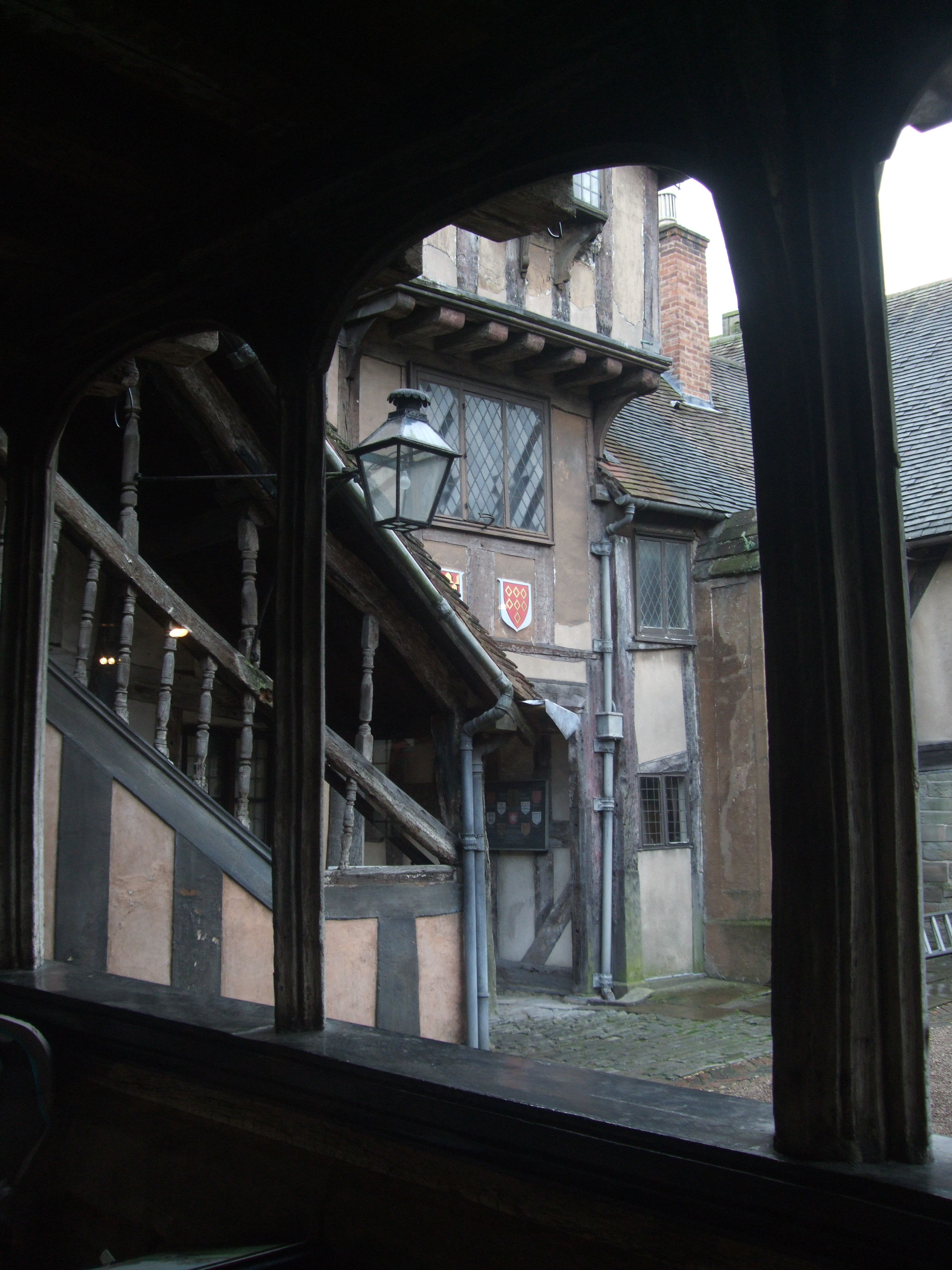
Lord Leycester Hospital, Warwick

- Nicholas Chamberlaine Almshouses, Bedworth, dating from 1840 and Grade II* listed
- Gramer Cottages, including James Gramer Almshouses, Mancetter
- Guild of the Holy Cross, Church Street Almshouses, Stratford-upon-Avon, which are Grade I listed. They were founded in 1417/18 for old and needy members of the guild and in 1553 were transferred to Stratford upon Avon Corporation to accommodate 24 elderly townsfolk.
- Emily Payne and Elizabeth Saunders Homes, Stratford-upon-Avon (1950)
- Mary Newlands Almshouses, Stratford-upon-Avon (1857)
- John Roberts Almshouses, Stratford-upon-Avon (1936)
- St Josephs Homestead, Stratford-upon-Avon (1912)
- Lord Leycester Hospital, Warwick
- The Guild Cottages, Bowling Green Street, Warwick – seven almshouses founded in 1991 by the combined Thomas Oken & Nicholas Eyffler Charity
- The Almshouses, Castle Hill, Warwick – four almshouses founded in c16 by Nicholas Eyffler
- The Almshouses, Castle Hill, Warwick – six almshouses added to the four above, founded in c16 by Thomas Oken
- Stoneleigh Old Almshouses, Stoneleigh (founded in 1576 by Sir Thomas & Lady Alice Leigh of Stoneleigh Abbey for five unmarried men and five women)
- Widow's Charity Houses, High Street, Kenilworth (founded in 1644 for poor widows by George Denton of Warwick)
- Leamington Hastings Almshouse, Leamington Hastings (founded in 1608 for eight poor people by Humphrey Davis, schoolmaster)
- Rose Cottage, Banbury Road, Ettington, once thatched and now a private home
- Lawrence Sheriff Almshouses in Rugby

=== West Midlands ===
==== Birmingham ====
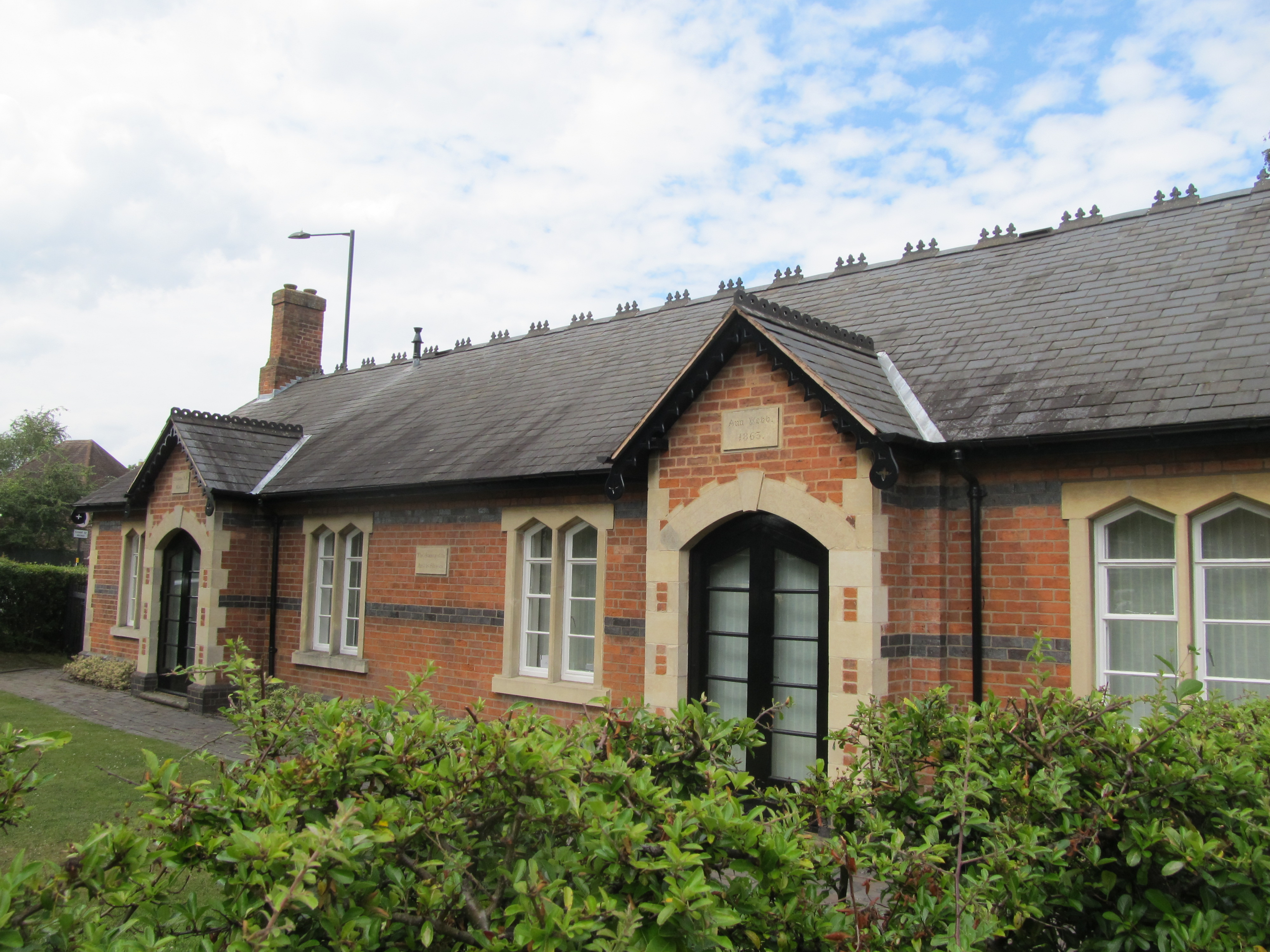
Walmley Almshouses, Royal Sutton Coldfield

- Cadbury Almshouses, Mary Vale Road, Bournville
- Glovers Trust Almshouses, Chester Road, Royal Sutton Coldfield
- Harborne Parish Lands Charity, Dore House, 56a Lordswood Road, Harborne
- Harborne Parish Lands Charity, Harbourne House, Tibbetts Lane, Harborne, built 1984
- Holte & Bracebridge Almshouses, Church Road, Erdington, re-built 1930
- James Lloyd Trust, Heath Road, Bournville – new build houses
- James Memorial Cottages Almshouse, Nechells Park Road, Nechells
- Lench's Trust (est. 1525), Quinton
- Lench's Trust, Ravenhurst Cottages, Ravenhurst Street, Camp Hill
- Lench's Trust, Conybere Street, Highgate, Birmingham
- Rhodes Almshouses, Soho Road/Belgrave Terrace, Handsworth
- Walmley Almshouses, Royal Sutton Coldfield
- Elizabeth Dowell's Almshouse Trust, Moseley

==== Coventry ====
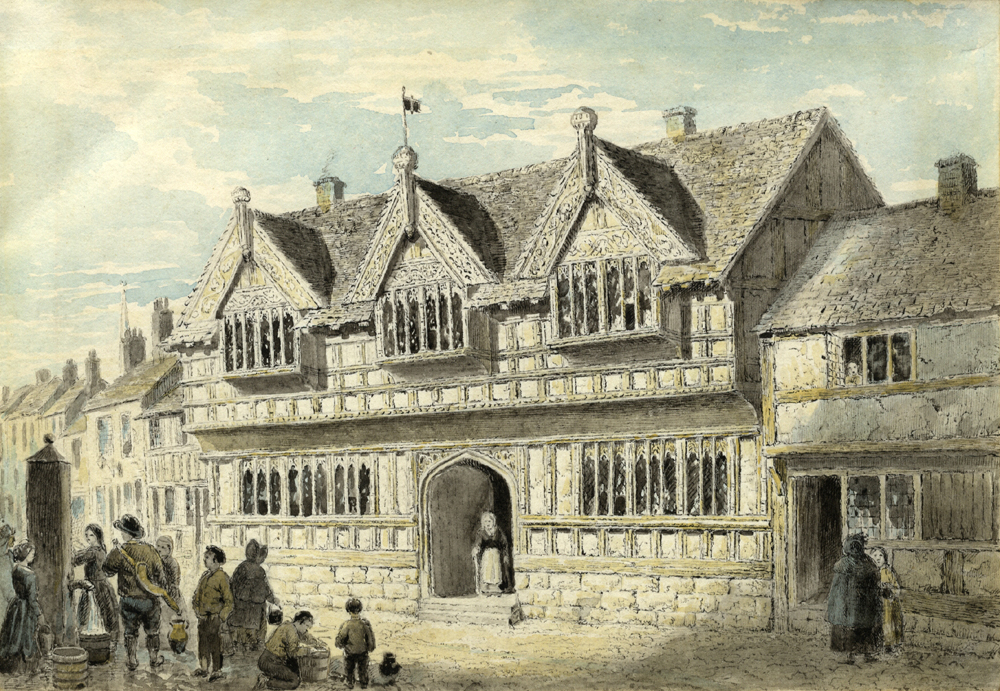
Ford's Hospital, Coventry

- Bond's Hospital, built in 1506 and now Grade II* listed
- Ford's Hospital, traditionally known as Grey Friars Hospital; Grade I listed, it was founded in 1509.
- Lady Herbert's Homes (built in 1935 and 1937), Lady Herbert's Gardens, Chauntry Place
- Bond's Lodge (founded in 2020), Hill Street

==== Dudley ====
- Almshouses, Church Road, Old Swinford
- Peter Harris Almshouses, Seager's Lane, Brierley Hill
- Sedgley Almshouses, Ettymore Road, Sedgley

==== Sandwell ====
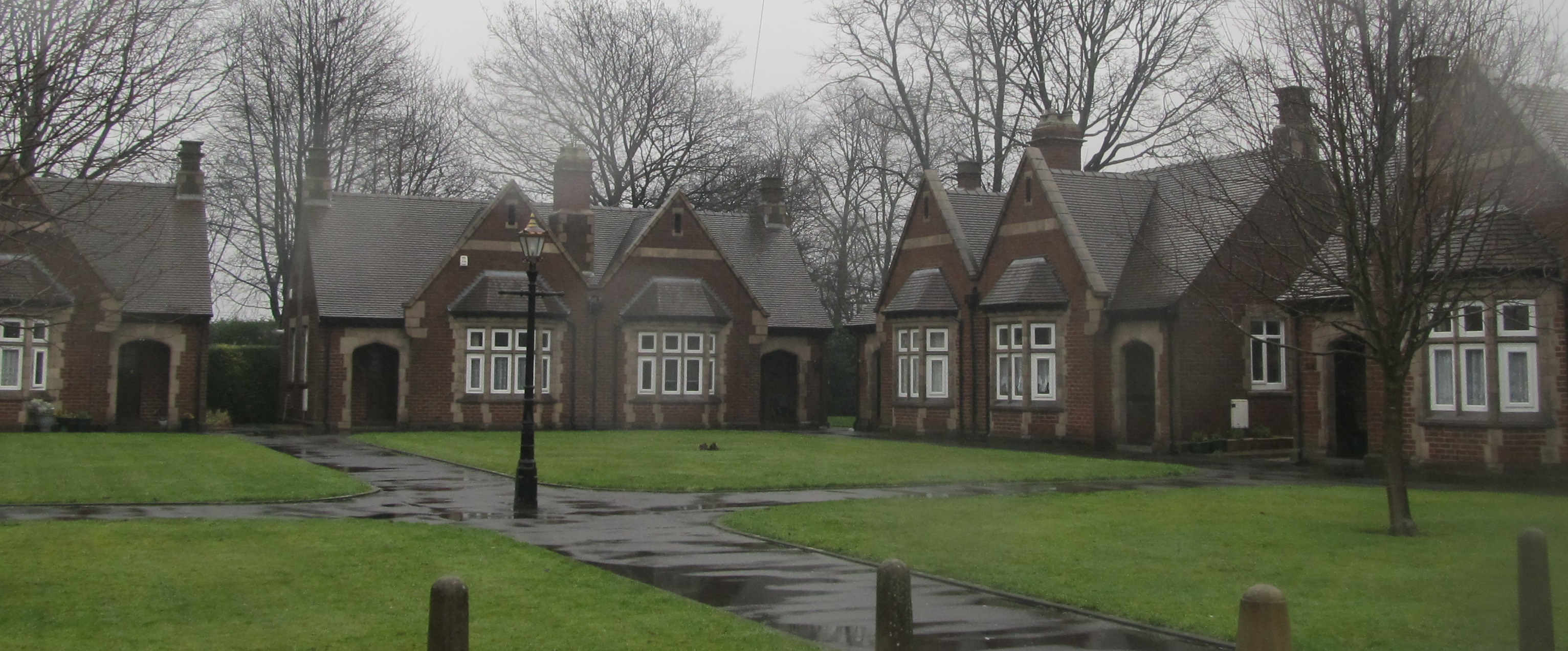
Akrill Almshouses, West Bromwich

- Akrill Homes, West Bromwich
- Harbourne Parish Lands Charity, almshouses around Hales Lane and Taylors Lane, Smethwick
- Henry Mitchell Almshouses (Harborne Cottages), Coopers Lane, Smethwick

==== Solihull ====
- Davenport Homes, Knowle

==== Walsall ====
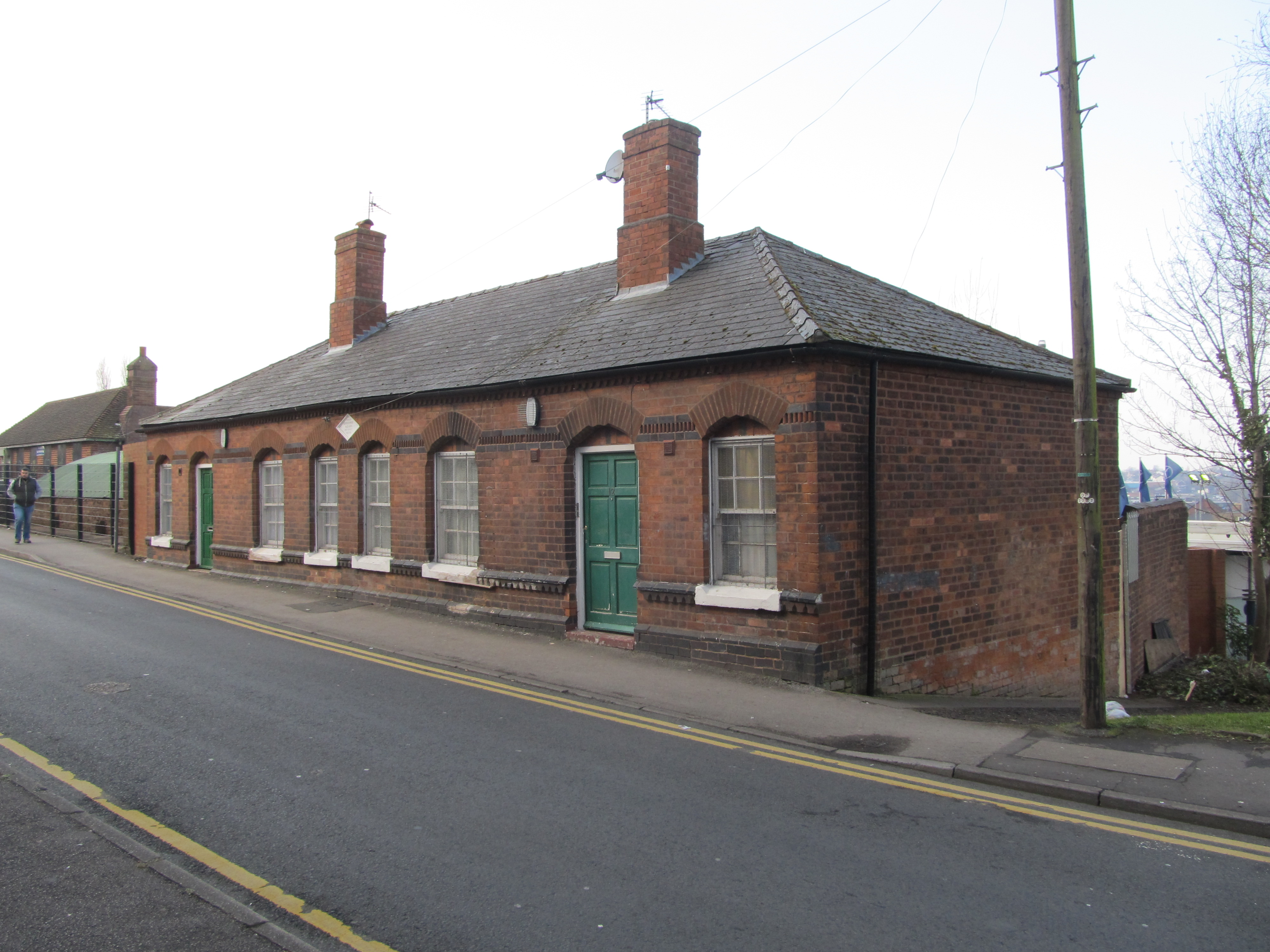
Harper's Almshouses, Walsall

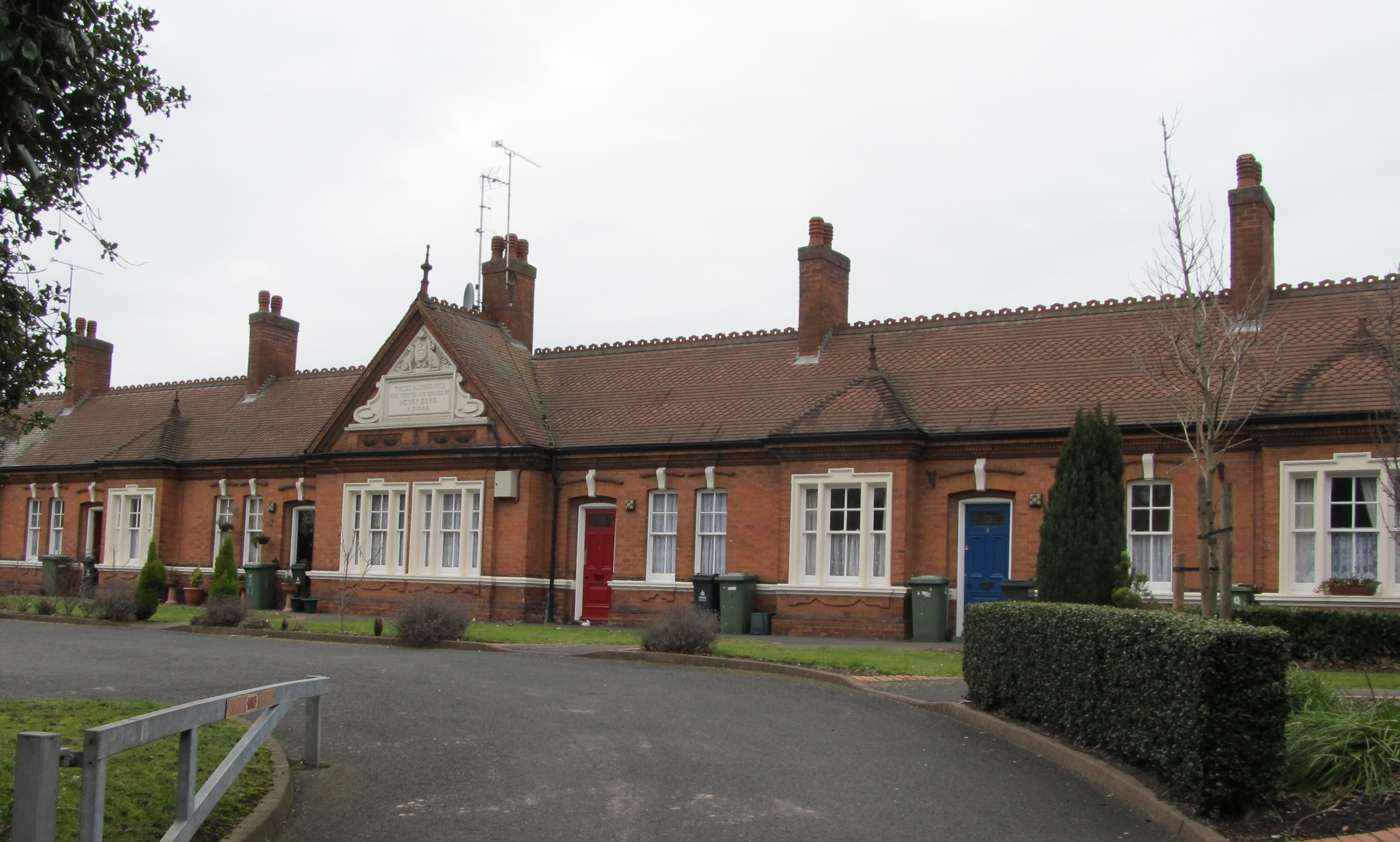
Henry Boys' Almshouses, Walsall

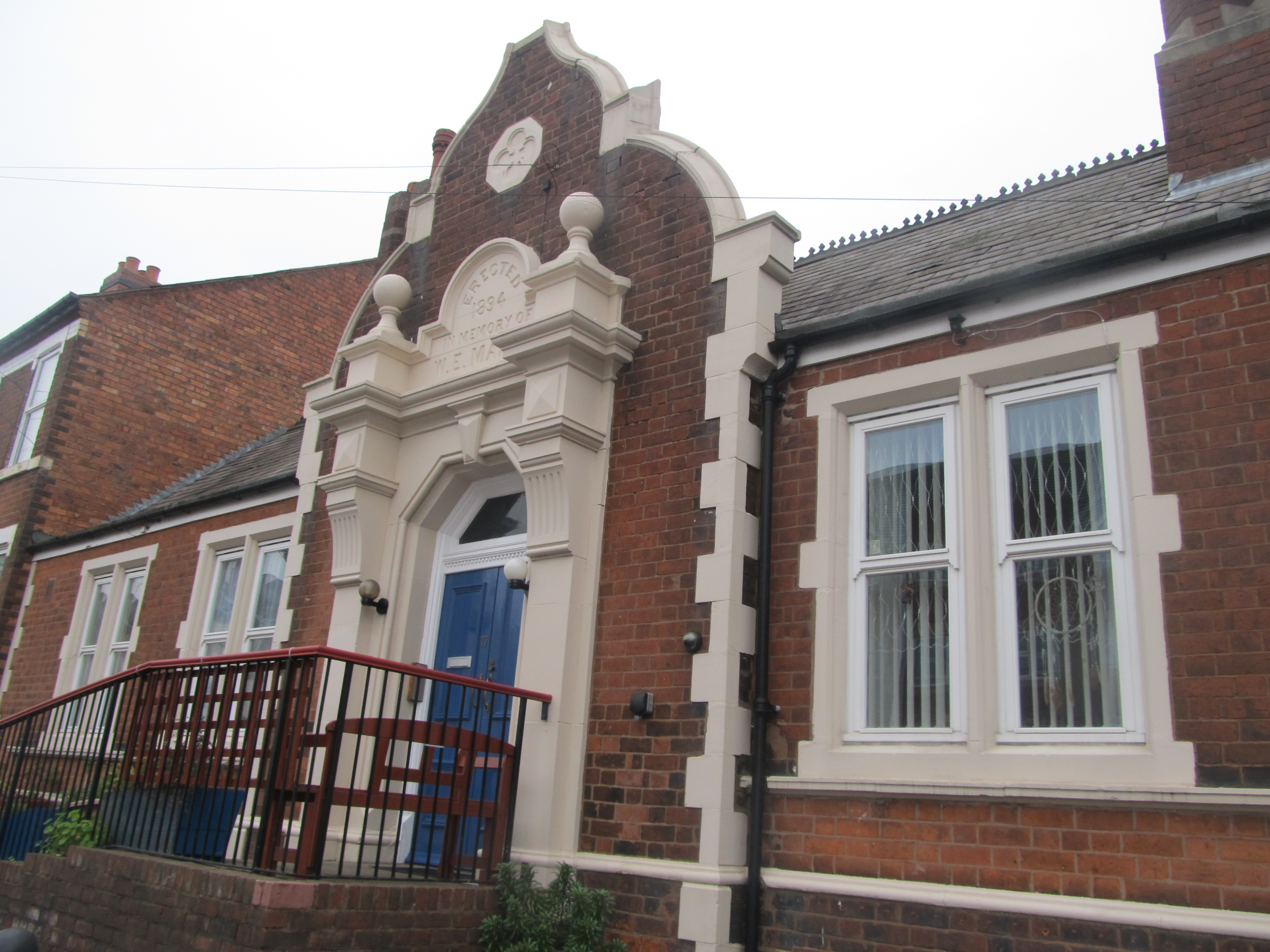
Marsh's Almshouses, Walsall
- Chavasse Almshouses, Lichfield Road, Rushall
- Crump's Almshouses, Eldon Street
- Harper's Almshouses, 12–14 Bath Street
- Henry Boys Almshouses, Wednesbury Road/Tasker Street
- Marsh's Almshouses, Bath Road

==== Wolverhampton ====
- Rogers Almshouses, Church Gardens, Powell Street, Heath Town
- Sedgwick Almshouses, Pennwood Lane, Lower Penn

==== Worcestershire ====
- The Almshouse Charity Birlingham, Birlingham (1824)
- Burltons, Cookes and Sayers Almshouses, Bewdley (1693)
- The Beauchamp Community Almshouses, Malvern (1864)
- Newcombe and Spier Almshouse Charity (17th century)
- Pershore Almshouses, Pershore (1961)
- Lasslets Almshouses Worcester (1912)
- St Oswald's Hospital, Worcester (990)
- Worcester Municipal Charities, Worcester (1559)
- Six Masters Charities, Worcester - overseas Lea's Almshouses )1869) and Queen Elizabeth's Almshouse (1561)

=== Wiltshire ===
- Hungerford Almshouses, Corsham, built in 1668 and now Grade I listed
- Farley Hospital, Farley (built 1681)
- Duchess of Somerset's Hospital, Froxfield (1694, 1775 and 1813)
- Hospital of St John, Heytesbury (endowed c.1472, rebuilt 1769)
- Sir James Thynne House, Longbridge Deverill (founded 1655)
- Hospital of St John, Malmesbury (13th century)
- College of Matrons, Salisbury (founded 1682)
- Topps Almshouses, Stockton (built 1657)

=== Yorkshire ===
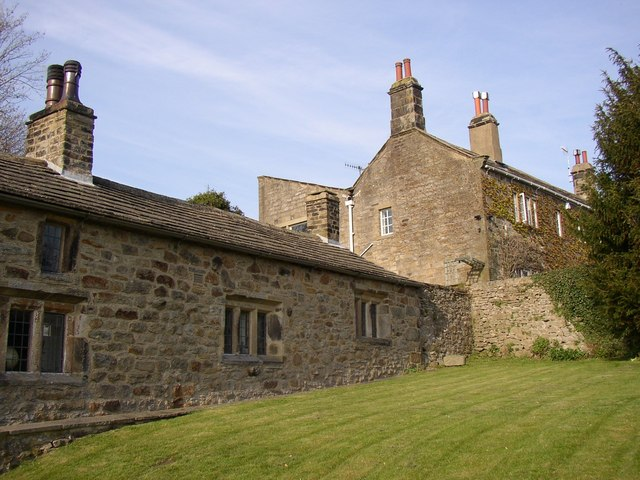
Beamsley Hospital

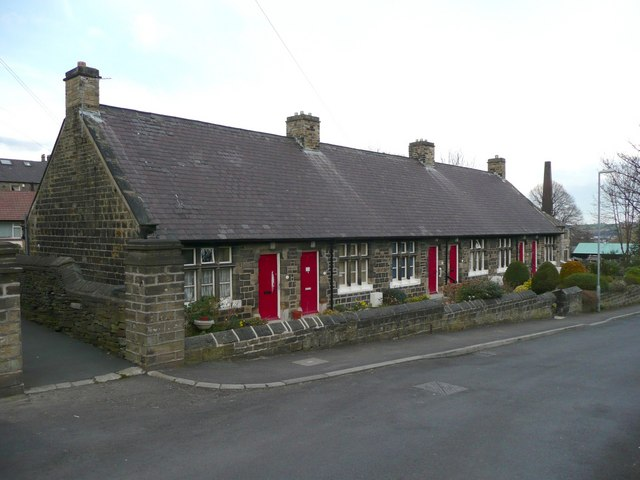
Nettleton's Almshouses, Huddersfield, designed by William Henry Crossland

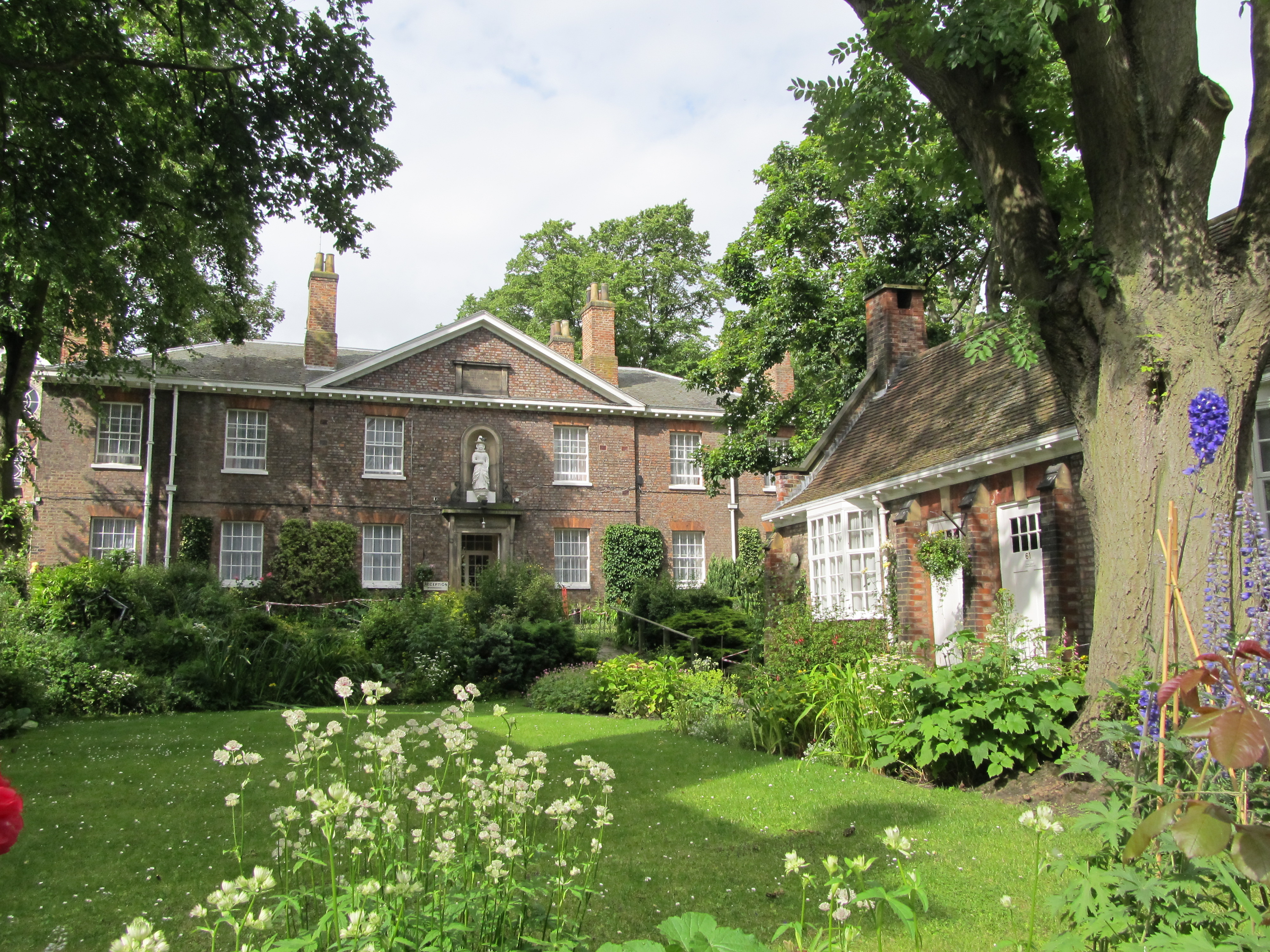
Sir Joseph Terry Almshouses, York

==== East Yorkshire ====
- Almshouses, 14 College Street, Kingston-upon-Hull
- Beverley Consolidated Charity is an amalgamation of several local charities running almshouses in the town.

Historical almshouses include: Ann Routh's, Keldgate; Bede Houses, Lairgate; Charles Warton's, Minster Moorgate; Elizabeth Westoby's, Keldgate; Ellen Kennington's, Toll Gavel; Maisons de Dieu, Morton Lane; almshouses, Railway Street; William Parker's, Woodlands.

Newbuild almshouses include: Caroline Walker's, New Walkergate; Christopher Hobson Place, Kitchen Lane; Citadel Court, Wilbert Lane; Crown Mews, Hengate; David Gray Jackson's, Cartwright Lane; Eric Bielby Close, Railway Street; James Arthur Smedley's, Ladygate; Keldgate Bar, Keldgate; Leconfield Close, Keldgate; Porter Place, Trinity Lane.

- Linsdall's Hospital and Flanking Walls, Patrington
- Northumberland Almshouses, 150 Fountain Road, Kingston-upon-Hull
- The Charterhouse, Kingston upon Hull

==== North Yorkshire ====
- Beamsley Hospital, Beamsley, founded in 1593. The north wing is Grade I listed and the south wing is Grade II* listed.
- Fontaines Hospital, Linton
- Lady Lumley's Almshouses, Lady Lumley's School, Thornton-le-Dale
- St John's Almshouses, Ripon, which are Grade II listed
- Sir William Turner's Almshouses, Kirkleatham, Redcar

==== South Yorkshire ====
- Hollis Hospital, Sheffield. There are four accommodation blocks: East, West, Central and North West. The four blocks were designed by Howard C Clarke and built in 1903. Each of the four blocks is a Grade II listed building. The east block has an inscribed slate plaque dated 1703.
- John Eaton's Almshouses, Sheffield
- Shrewsbury Hospital, Sheffield

==== West Yorkshire ====
- Ripley Ville Almshouses, Bradford (built 1881)
- Joseph Crossley's Almshouses, Halifax
- Sir Francis Crossley's Almshouses, Halifax, built by Francis Crossley
- Waterhouse Homes, Halifax
- St Leonard's Almshouses, Horbury (built 1888)
- Nettleton's Almshouses, Northgate, Almondbury, Huddersfield (1861–63), designed by William Henry Crossland
- Saltaire Almshouses, Saltaire
- Ledsham Almshouses, Ledsham
- Harrison's Almshouses, Sandal, Wakefield

==== York ====
- Ingram's Hospital, which was built in 1630–1640 and is now Grade II* listed
- Terry Memorial Homes, Skeldergate, which were built in 1898 and are now Grade II listed

== Scotland ==
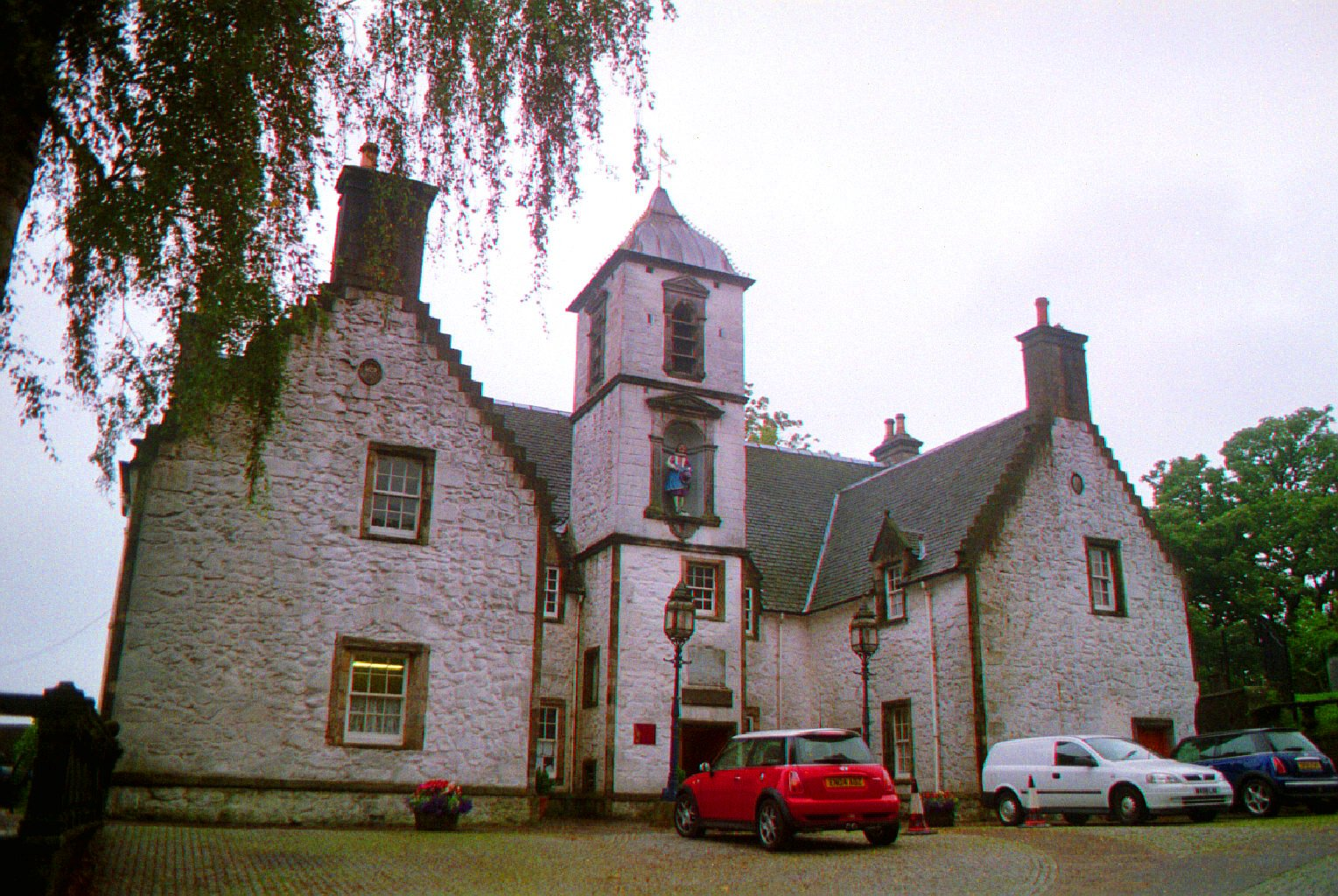
Cowane's Hospital, Stirling
- Cowane's Hospital, Stirling, established in 1637 and now category A listed by Historic Environment Scotland

=== Former almshouses ===
- Trinity House of Leith in Leith, Edinburgh, is a category A listed building and is now a maritime museum.

== Wales ==
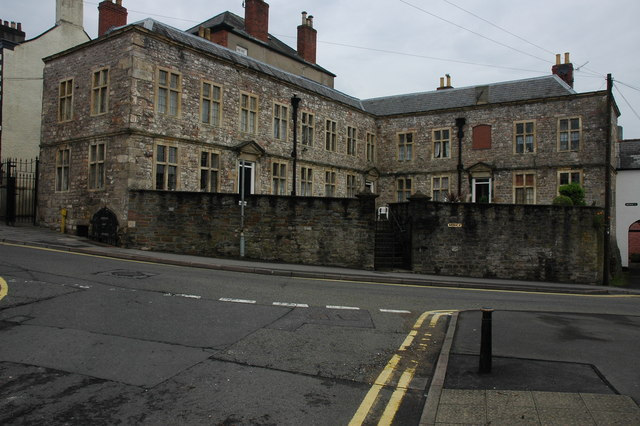
Powis Almshouses, Chepstow
- Bangor Cathedral Almshouses, Bangor, Gwynedd
- Burton Almshouses, Newport
- Monmouth Alms Houses, Monmouth
- Powis Almshouses, Chepstow, Monmouthshire, which are Grade II* listed; the building dates from about 1721
- Queen Victoria Almshouses, Newport

== Northern Ireland ==
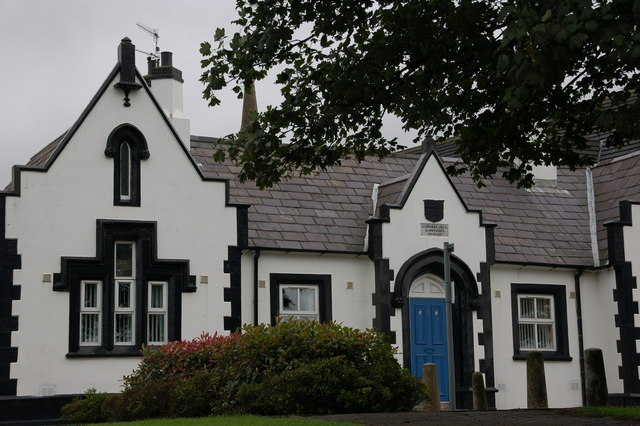
Gill's Almshouses, Carrickfergus

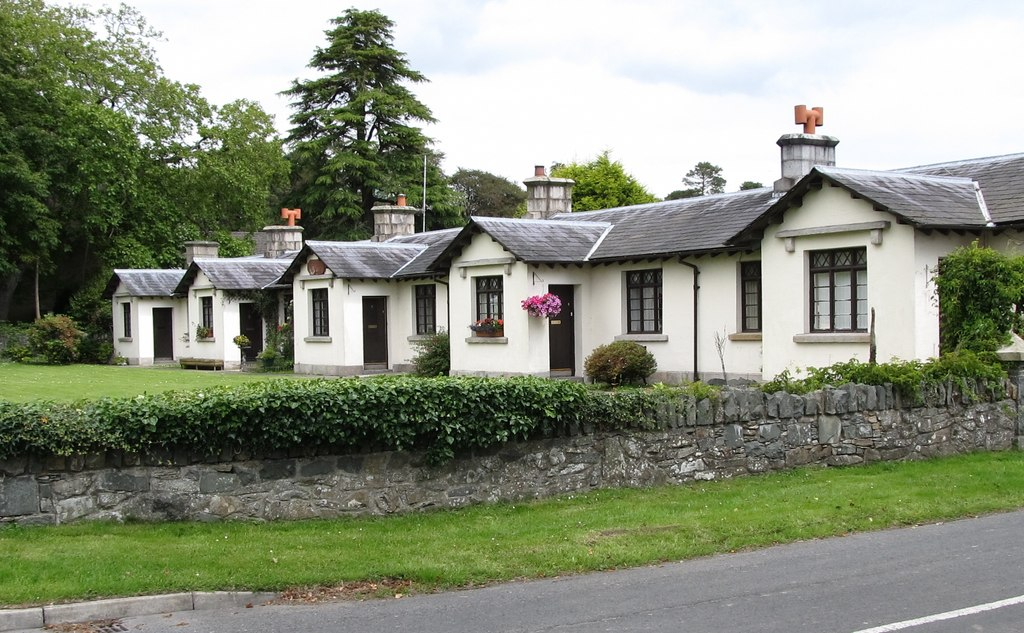
Seaforde Almshouses, County Down
- Annahilt Almshouses, Annahilt, County Down, built in 1833 and restored in 1987 for social housing purposes
- Armagh Sheils Buildings, Armagh
- Gill's Almshouses, Carrickfergus, County Antrim, designed by Charles Lanyon and erected in 1842
- Killough Sheils Buildings, Killough, County Down
- Seaforde Almshouses, Newcastle Road, Seaforde, County Down
- Sheils Almshouses, Carrickfergus
