= WPSA =

WPSA may refer to:

- Western Political Science Association, American scholarly organization
- Wildlife Preservation Society of Australia, Australian environmental conservation organisation
- Women's Professional Soccer Association, American top-flight women's soccer league
- Workers Party of South Africa, South African political party
- WPSA (New York), a former student-run radio station at Paul Smith's College
- WPSA-LP, a low-power radio station in Wisconsin
- World's Poultry Science Association, international organization of poultry scientists established in 1912
- Westminster Passenger Services Association, A company operating passenger services on the River Thames between Westminster, Kew, Richmond & Hampton Court.
