= Richmond, London =

Town in Greater London, England

Coordinates: 51.456°N 0.301°W

Richmond
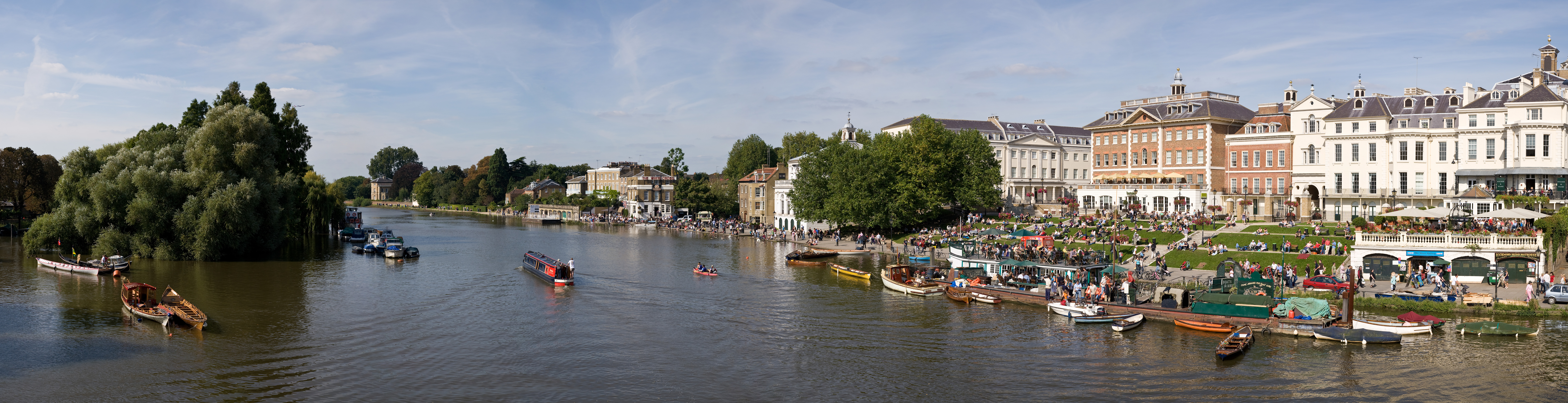
- Richmond Riverside

- Location within Greater London
- Area: 5.38 km^{2} (2.08 sq mi)
- Population: 21,469 (North Richmond and South Richmond wards 2011)
  - Density: 3,991/km^{2} (10,340/sq mi)
- OS grid reference: TQ1874
  - Charing Cross: 8.2 mi (13.2 km) ENE
- London borough: Richmond
- Ceremonial county: Greater London
- Region: London
- Country: England
- Sovereign state: United Kingdom
- Post town: RICHMOND
- Postcode district: TW9, TW10
- Dialling code: 020
- Police: Metropolitan
- Fire: London
- Ambulance: London
- UK Parliament: Richmond Park
- London Assembly: South West

Richmond is a town in south-west London, (Note: The London Government Act 1963 (c.33) (as amended) categorises the London Borough of Richmond upon Thames as an Outer London borough. Although it is on both sides of the River Thames, the Boundary Commission for England defines it as being in South London or the South Thames sub-region, pairing it with Kingston upon Thames for the purposes of devising constituencies. However, for the purposes of the London Plan, Richmond now lies within the West London region.) 8.2 miles (13.2 km) west-southwest of Charing Cross. It stands on the River Thames, and features many parks and open spaces, including Richmond Park, and many protected conservation areas, which include much of Richmond Hill. A specific Act of Parliament protects the scenic view of the River Thames from Richmond.

Richmond was founded following King Henry VII's building in the early 16th century of Richmond Palace (so named in 1501), from which the town derives its name. (The palace's manor itself took its name from King Henry's earldom of Richmond, North Yorkshire, the original Richmond.) The town and palace became particularly associated with Queen Elizabeth I (r. 1558–1603), who spent her last days there. During the 18th century, Richmond Bridge connected the two banks of the Thames, and many Georgian terraces were built, particularly around Richmond Green and on Richmond Hill. Those that have survived remain well preserved, and many have been designated listed buildings on account of their architectural or historic significance. The opening of Richmond railway station in 1846 was a significant event in the absorption of the town into a rapidly expanding London.

In 1890, the town of Richmond, formerly part of the ancient parish of Kingston upon Thames in the county of Surrey, became a municipal borough, which was later extended to include Kew, Ham, Petersham and North Sheen (which had been part of Mortlake). in 1933, Ham was added to the borough. In 1965, the parish and municipal borough were abolished by the London Government Act 1963, which transferred Richmond to Greater London. Together with the former Municipal Borough of Twickenham and the former Municipal Borough of Barnes, it formed a new borough, the London Borough of Richmond upon Thames.

As of 2011 it had a population of 21,469 (in the North Richmond and South Richmond wards). It has a significant commercial and retail centre with a developed day and evening economy. The name "Richmond upon Thames" refers to the London borough as a whole, not to the town of Richmond.

== History ==
=== Name ===
The area was known in the medieval period as Shene, a name first recorded (as Sceon) in the 10th century, and which survives in the neighbouring districts of East Sheen (also known as Sheen) and North Sheen. The manor entered royal hands, and the manor house eventually became known as Sheen Palace, before being largely destroyed by fire in 1497. Henry VII rebuilt it and in 1501 named it Richmond Palace, in allusion to his earldom of Richmond and his ancestral honour of Richmond in Yorkshire. The associated settlement took the same name, although for some years the two names were often used in conjunction (for example, "Shene otherwise called Richemount").

=== Royal residence ===
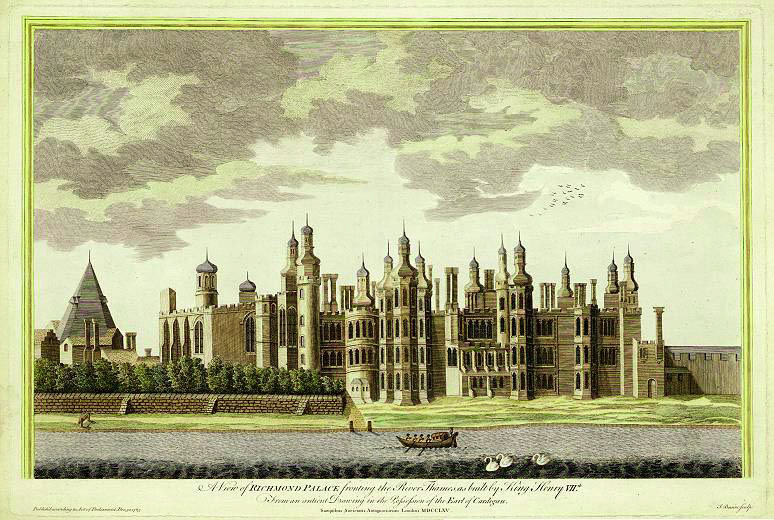
A view of Richmond Palace published in 1765 and based on earlier drawings

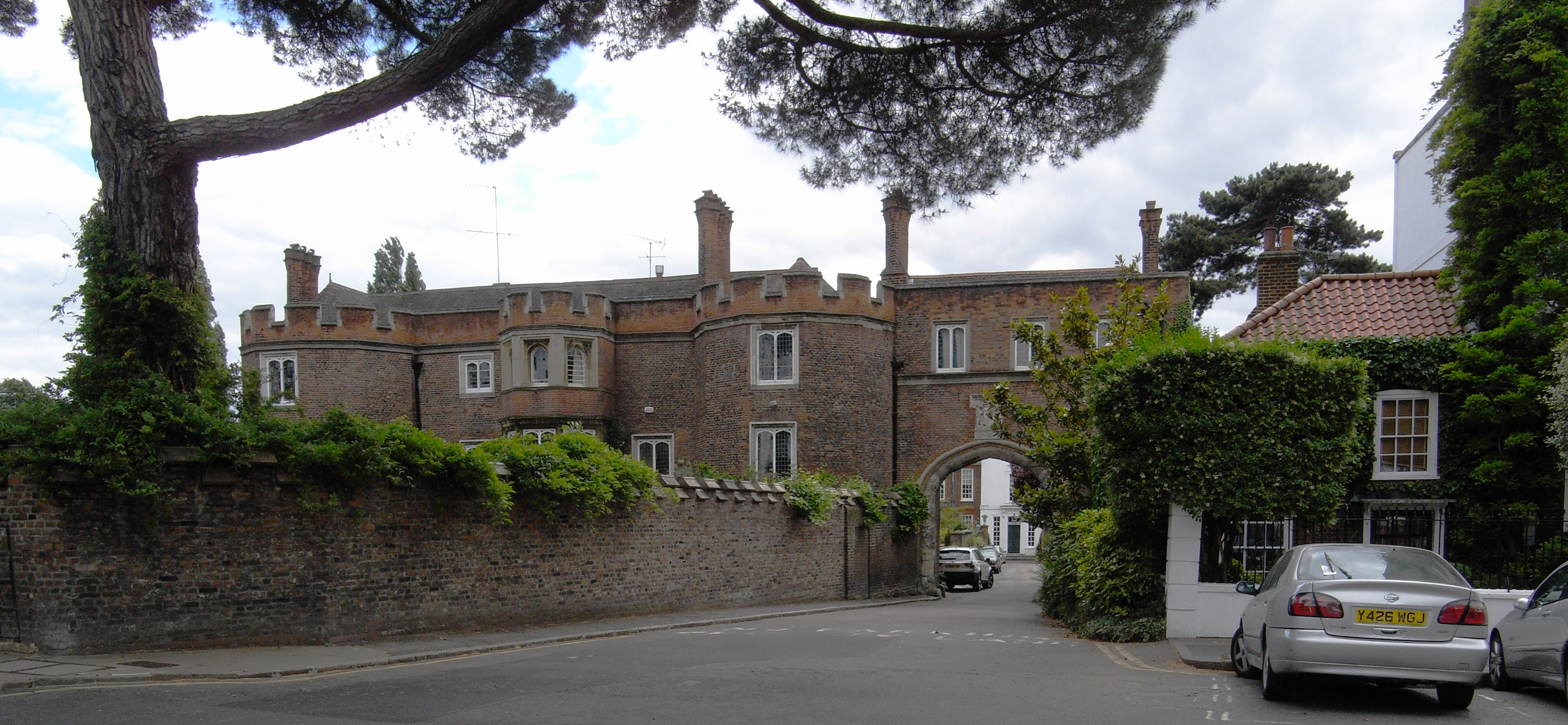
Richmond Palace Gate House

Henry I lived briefly in the King's house in "Sheanes". In 1299, Edward I, the "Hammer of the Scots", took his whole court to the manor house at Sheen, a little east of the bridge and on the riverside, and it thus became a royal residence; William Wallace was executed in London in 1305, and it was in Sheen that the Commissioners from Scotland went down on their knees before Edward.

Edward II, following his defeat by the Scots at the Battle of Bannockburn in 1314, founded a monastery for Carmelites at Sheen. When the boy-king Edward III came to the throne in 1327, he gave the manor to his mother Isabella. Edward later spent over £2,000 on improvements but, in the middle of the work, Edward himself died at the manor, in 1377. Richard II was the first English king to make Sheen his main residence, which he did in 1383. Twelve years later, Richard was so distraught at the death of his wife Anne of Bohemia at the age of 28 that, according to the 16th-century English chronicler Raphael Holinshed, he "caused it [the manor] to be thrown down and defaced; whereas the former kings of this land, being wearie of the citie, used customarily thither to resort as to a place of pleasure, and serving highly to their recreation". It was rebuilt between 1414 and 1422, but destroyed by fire in 1497.

Following that fire, Henry VII built a new residence at Sheen, and in 1501 he named it Richmond Palace. The theatre company to which Shakespeare belonged performed some plays there during the reign of Elizabeth I. As Queen, Elizabeth spent much of her time at Richmond, as she enjoyed hunting stags in the "Newe Parke of Richmonde" (now Old Deer Park). She died at the palace on 24 March 1603. The palace was no longer in residential use after 1649 but, in 1688, James II ordered its partial reconstruction, this time as a royal nursery. The bulk of the palace had decayed by 1779, but surviving structures include the Wardrobe, Trumpeters' House (built around 1700), and the Gate House, built in 1501. All three are listed at Grade I by Historic England.

=== 18th- and 19th-century development ===
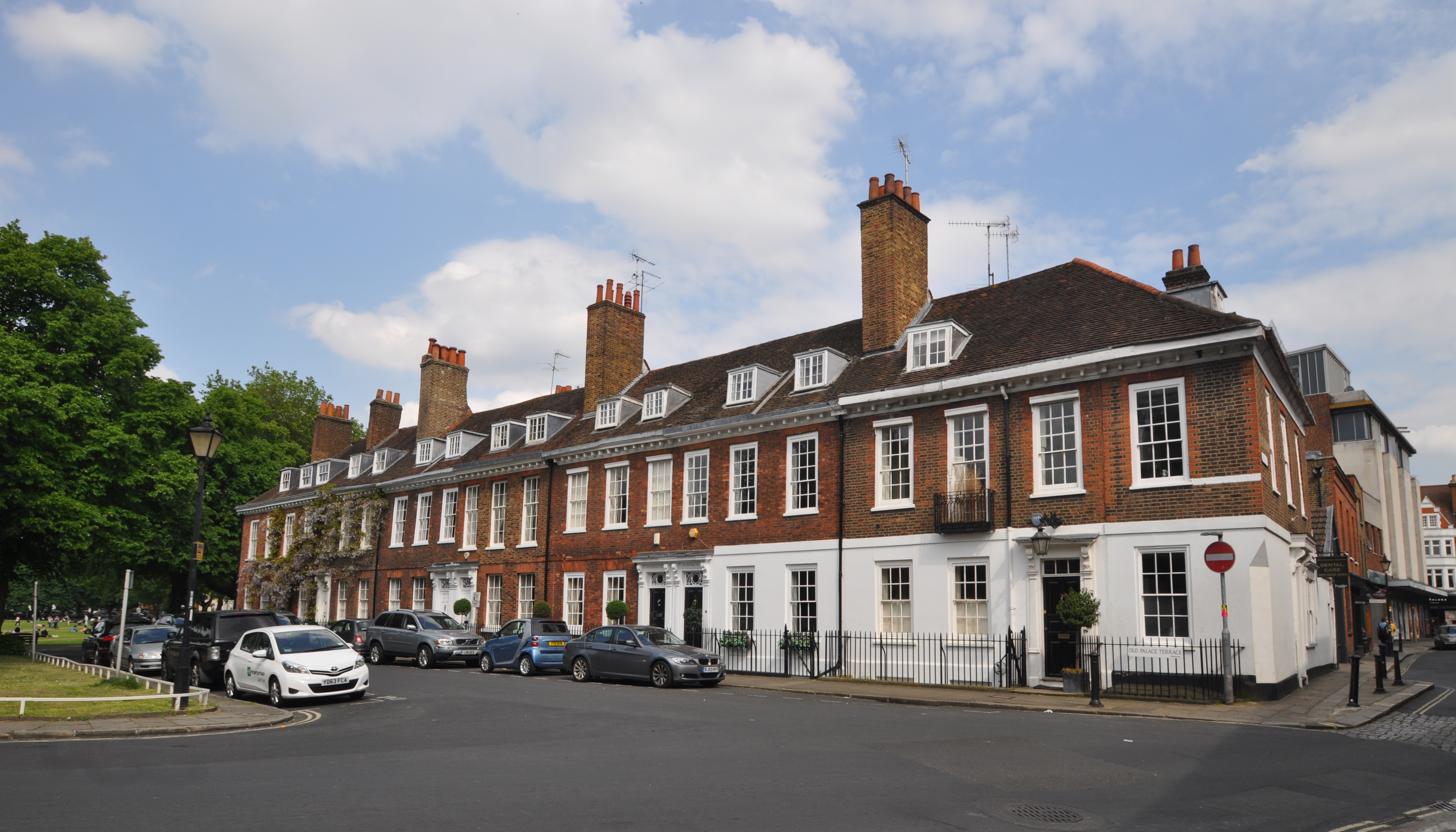
Georgian houses at Old Palace Terrace on Richmond Green

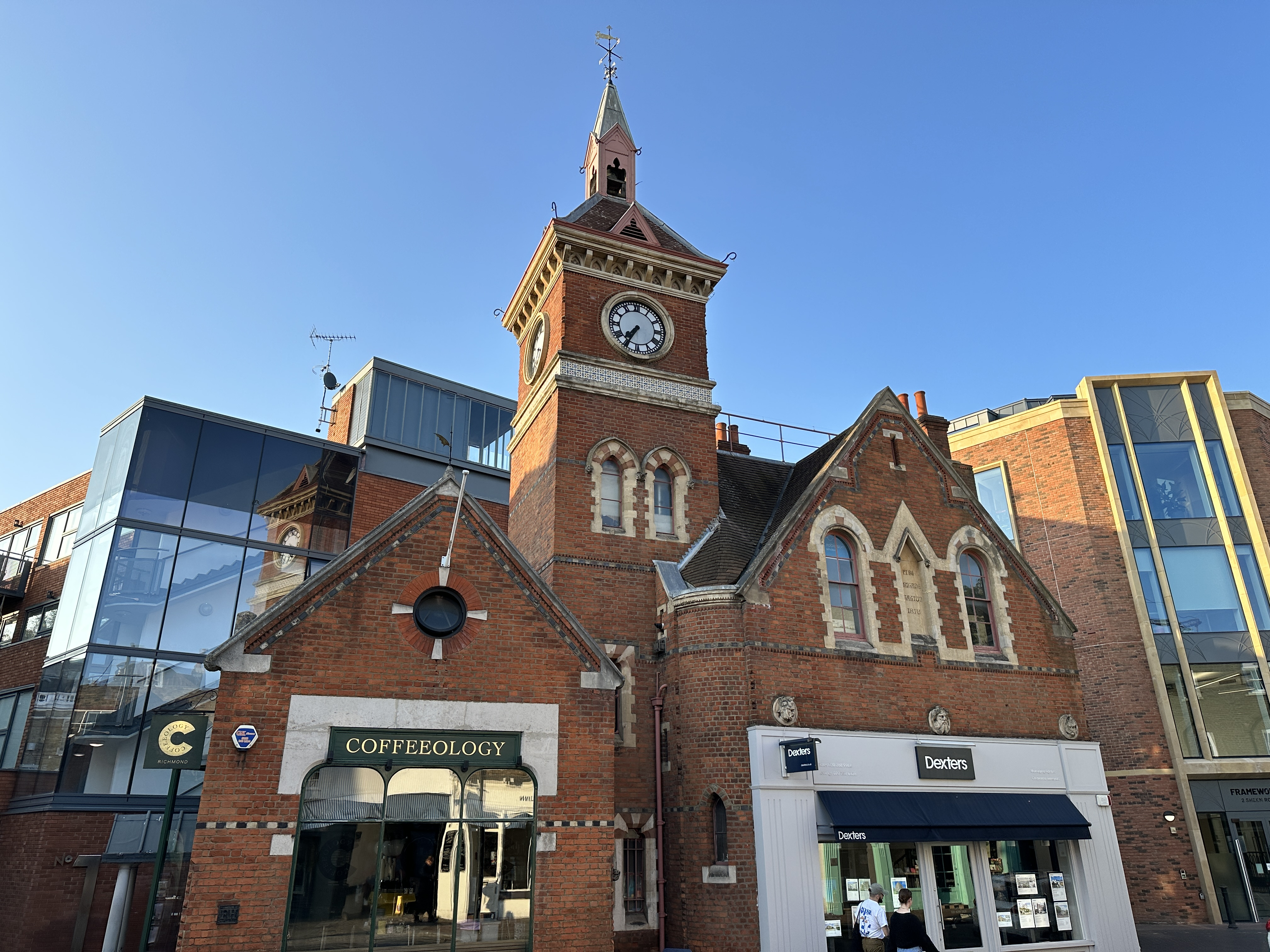
The town's former fire station, built in the late 19th century, with a distinctive lantern clock tower

Beyond the grounds of the old palace, Richmond remained mostly agricultural land until the 18th century. White Lodge, in the middle of what is now Richmond Park, was built as a hunting lodge for George II, and during this period the number of large houses in their own grounds – such as Asgill House and Pembroke Lodge – increased significantly. These were followed by the building of further important houses, including Downe House, Wick House and The Wick on Richmond Hill, as this area became an increasingly fashionable place in which to live. Richmond Bridge was completed in 1777 to replace a ferry crossing that connected Richmond town centre on the east bank with its neighbouring district of East Twickenham. Today, this bridge, together with the well-preserved Georgian terraces that surround Richmond Green and line Richmond Hill to its crest, now has listed building status.

As Richmond continued to prosper and expand during the 19th century, much luxurious housing was built on the streets that line Richmond Hill, as well as shops in the town centre to serve the increasing population. In July 1892, the Corporation formed a joint-stock company, the Richmond (Surrey) Electric Light and Power Company, and this wired the town for electricity by around 1896.

=== World Wars ===
Like many other large towns in Britain, Richmond lost many young people who fought in the First and Second World Wars. They are commemorated at the Richmond War Memorial, which now commemorates both wars and was installed in 1921 at the end of Whittaker Avenue, between the Old Town Hall and the Riverside. In the Second World War, 97 people were killed in air raids, which also resulted in the demolition of 297 houses.

== Governance ==
=== Current ===
The town of Richmond is in the London Borough of Richmond upon Thames, which is governed by Richmond upon Thames London Borough Council. The most recent election was in May 2026 when the Liberal Democrats retained control of the council, winning all 54 seats on it. Richmond town is divided into two wards – North Richmond, which has three councillors, and South Richmond, with three councillors.

Richmond town forms part of the Richmond Park constituency for the UK Parliament. The MP, since 2019, is Sarah Olney from the Liberal Democrats. Richmond is also part of the South West constituency for the London Assembly, which has been represented by Gareth Roberts from the Liberal Democrats since 2024.

=== Historical ===
Richmond, earlier known as Shene, was part of the large ancient parish of Kingston upon Thames in the Kingston hundred of Surrey. Split off from Kingston upon Thames from an early time, the parish of Richmond St Mary Magdalene formed the Municipal Borough of Richmond from 1890. The municipal borough was expanded in 1892 by the addition of Kew, Petersham and the North Sheen part of Mortlake; in 1933, Ham was added to the borough. In 1965, the parish and municipal borough were abolished by the London Government Act 1963, which transferred Richmond to Greater London. Together with the former Municipal Borough of Twickenham and the former Municipal Borough of Barnes, it formed a new borough, the London Borough of Richmond upon Thames.

== Geography ==
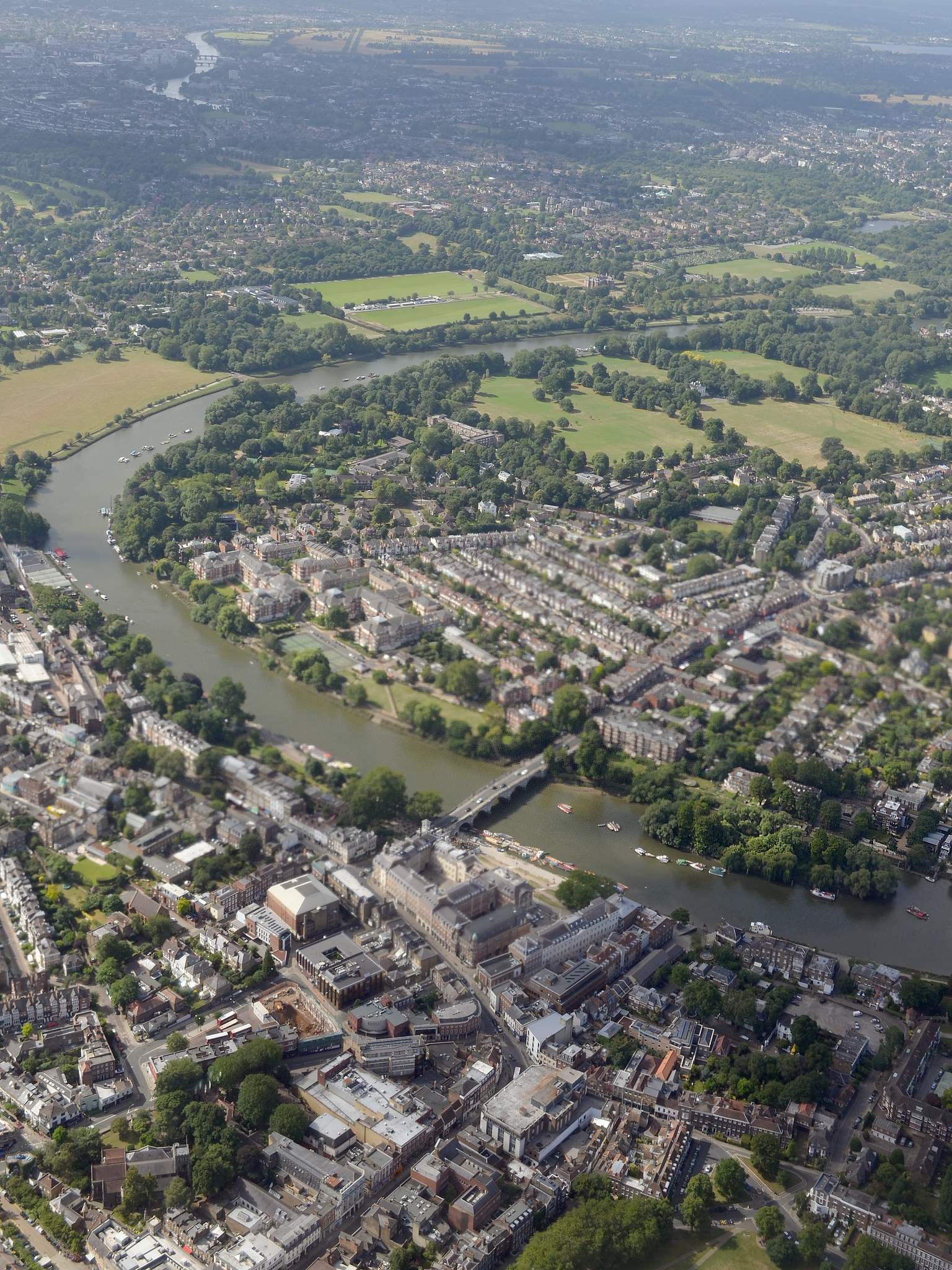
Aerial view of Richmond and East Twickenham from the north, August 2015

Richmond sits opposite East Twickenham on what is technically the south bank of the River Thames but, because of the bends of the river, the town is immediately north and north-east of its nearest stretch of river. The Thames curves around the town, and then Kew, in its course; starting from Petersham, it returns to a more direct west–east direction.

The river is still tidal at Richmond, so, to allow major passenger and goods traffic to continue to operate during low tide, a half-tide lock was opened in 1894 and is used when the adjacent weir is in position. This weir ensures that there is always a minimum depth of water of 5 ft 8 in (1.73 m) toward the middle of the river between Richmond and Teddington, whatever the state of the tide. At the lock and weir there is a footbridge across the river.

Richmond is well endowed with green and open spaces accessible to the public. At the heart of the town sits Richmond Green, which is roughly square in shape and together with the Little Green, a smaller green space stretching from its south-east corner, is 12 acres (4.9 hectares) in area. The Green is surrounded by well-used metalled roads that provide a fair amount of vehicle parking for both residents and visitors. The south corner leads into the main shopping area of the town; at the west corner is the old gatehouse which leads through to other remaining buildings of Richmond Palace; at the north corner is pedestrian access to Old Deer Park (plus vehicle access for municipal use).

Old Deer Park is a 360-acre (1.5 km^{2}) Crown Estate landscape extending from the town along the riverside as far as the boundary with the Royal Botanic Gardens at Kew, a UNESCO World Heritage Site. This contains wide green lawns and sports facilities, and the Grade I listed former King's Observatory erected for George III in 1769. The town's main shopping street, George Street, is also named after the king.

The town centre lies just below 33 ft (10 m) above sea level. South of the town centre, rising from Richmond Bridge to an elevation of 165 ft (50 m), is Richmond Hill. Just beyond the summit of Richmond Hill is Richmond Park, an area of 2,360 acres (9.6 km^{2}; 3.69 sq mi) of wild heath and woodland originally enclosed for hunting, and now forming London's largest royal park. The park is a national nature reserve, a Site of Special Scientific Interest and a Special Area of Conservation and is included, at Grade I, on Historic England's Register of Historic Parks and Gardens of special historic interest in England. It was created by Charles I in 1634 as a deer park and now has 630 red and fallow deer that roam freely through much of the park. The park has a number of traffic and pedestrian gates leading to the surrounding areas of East Sheen, Roehampton, Putney, Kingston and Ham.

=== Nearest places ===
- Barnes
- Brentford
- East Sheen
- Ham
- Hampton
- Hounslow
- Isleworth
- Kew
- Kingston upon Thames
- Mortlake
- Petersham
- Roehampton
- St Margarets
- Strawberry Hill
- Teddington
- Twickenham
- Whitton

== Economy ==
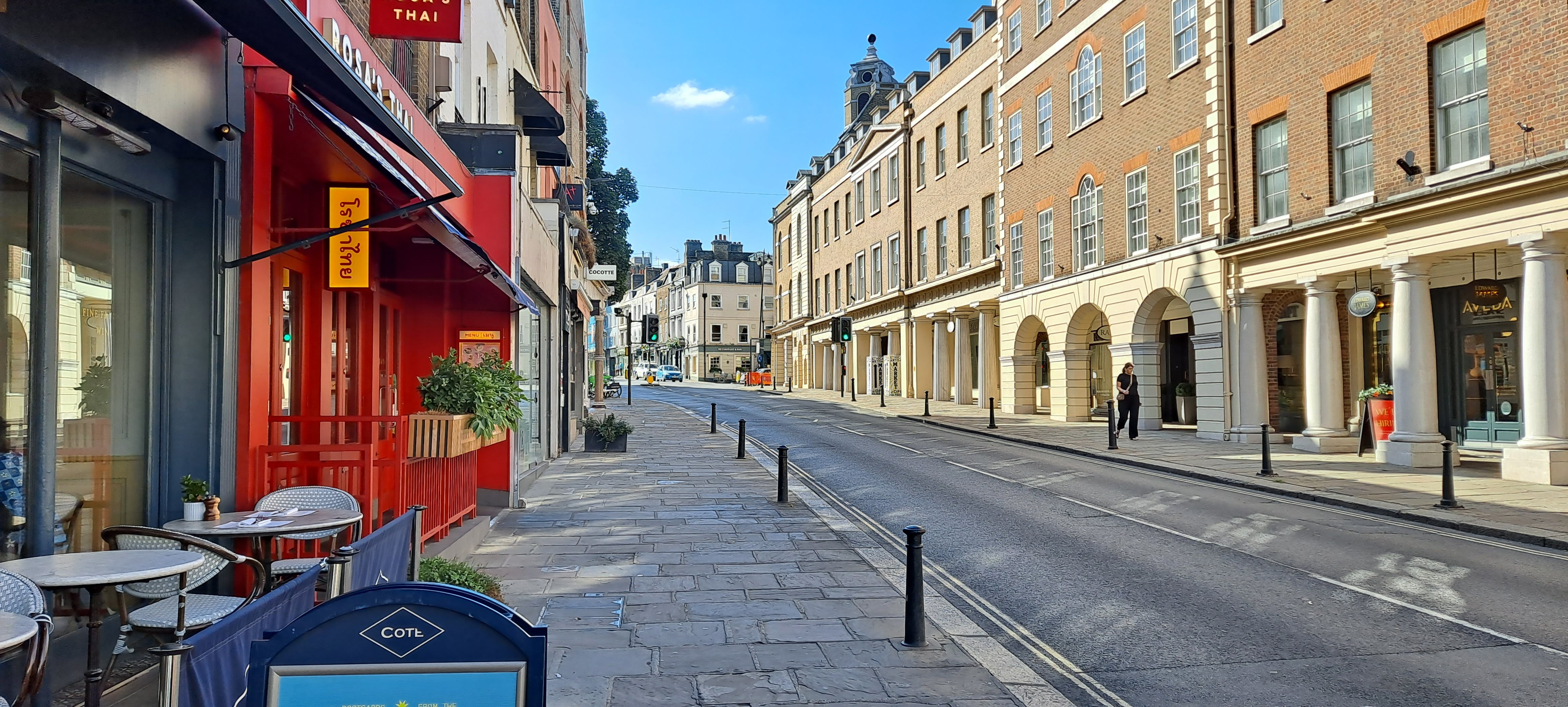
Hill Street, central Richmond

The London Borough of Richmond upon Thames, with Richmond North and Richmond South as two of its wards, has the least poverty in London. The town of Richmond has the largest commercial centre in the borough and is classified as a major centre according to the London Plan. It is an established upmarket shopping destination. Its compact centre has approximately 50,000 m^{2} of retail floor-space that is largely focused on George Street, The Quadrant and Hill Street. It comprises almost exclusively high street chains, the largest of which are Marks & Spencer, Boots, Tesco Metro and Waitrose. The remaining town centre stores are largely single units.

Mostly independent businesses line the narrow alleyways running off George Street towards Richmond Green and up Richmond Hill, and there is a farmers' market in Heron Square on Saturdays. Richmond has one large stand-alone supermarket, Sainsbury's, with parking for 420 cars, to the east of the town near North Sheen railway station. There are shops, restaurants and cafes on the crest of Richmond Hill lining Friars Stile Road, as well as along Kew Road towards the Botanic Gardens, and on Sheen Road.

Richmond also offers a wide variety of office accommodation and is the UK/European headquarters of several multi-national companies, including eBay and the Swiss chocolatier and confectionery company Lindt, as well as the head offices of a number of national, regional and local businesses. London's Evening Standard has described Richmond as "the beating heart of London's growing technology industry".

== Places of interest ==
=== Richmond Riverside ===
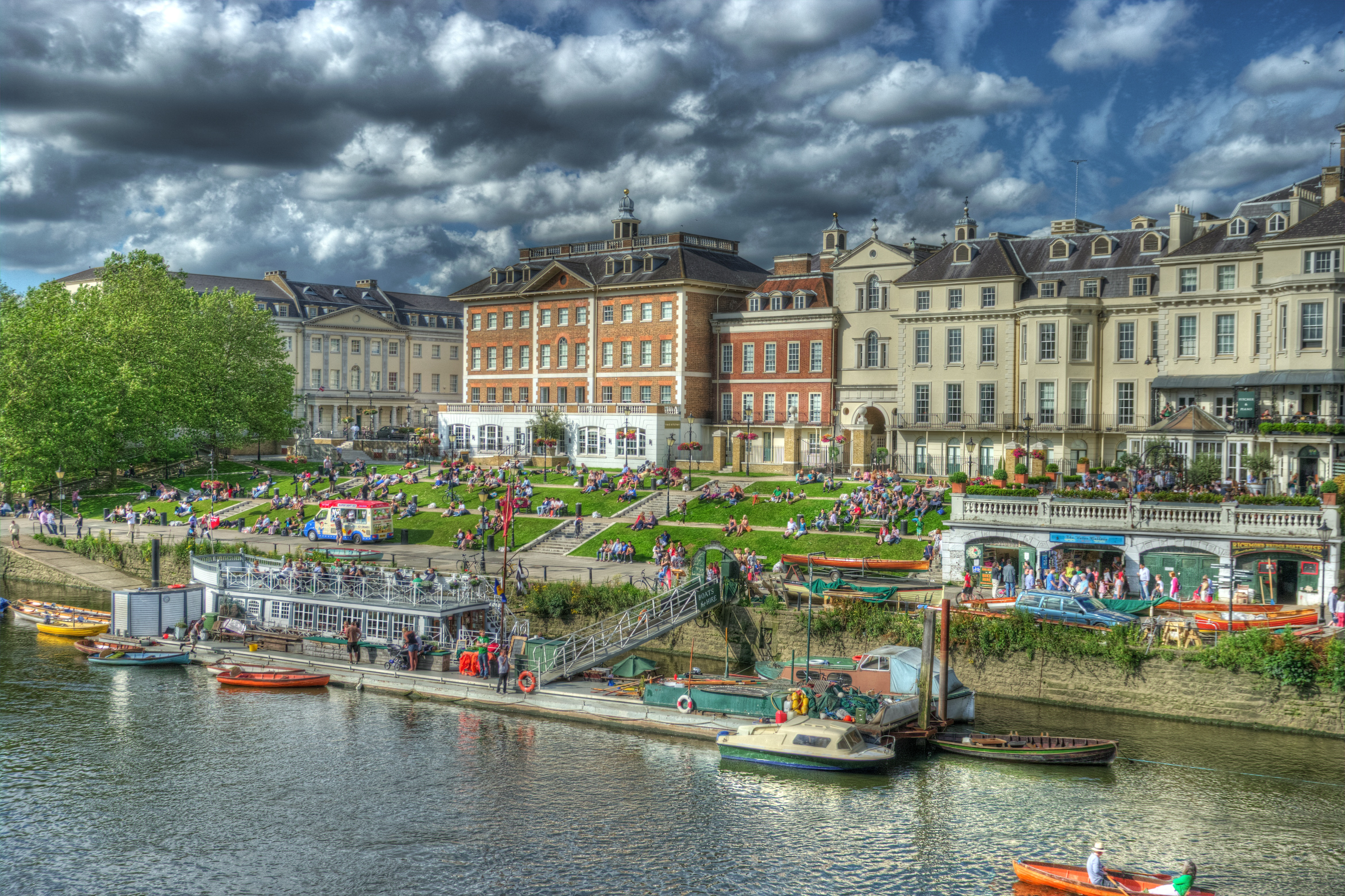
The Thames riverfront north of Richmond Bridge

The Thames is a major contributor to the interest that Richmond inspires in many people. It has an extensive frontage around Richmond Bridge, containing many bars and restaurants. Richmond Riverside owes much of its neo-Georgian style to the architect Quinlan Terry, who was commissioned to restore the area (1984–87). Within the river itself at this point are the leafy Corporation Island and the two small Flowerpot Islands. The Thames-side walkway provides access to residences, pubs (including the White Cross) and terraces, and various greens, lanes and footpaths through Richmond. The stretch of the Thames below Richmond Hill is known as Horse Reach and includes Glover's Island. There are towpaths and tracks along both sides of the river, and they are much used by pedestrians, joggers and cyclists. Westminster Passenger Services Association boats, licensed by London River Services, sail daily between Kew and Hampton Court Palace, calling at Richmond in each direction.

=== Richmond Green ===
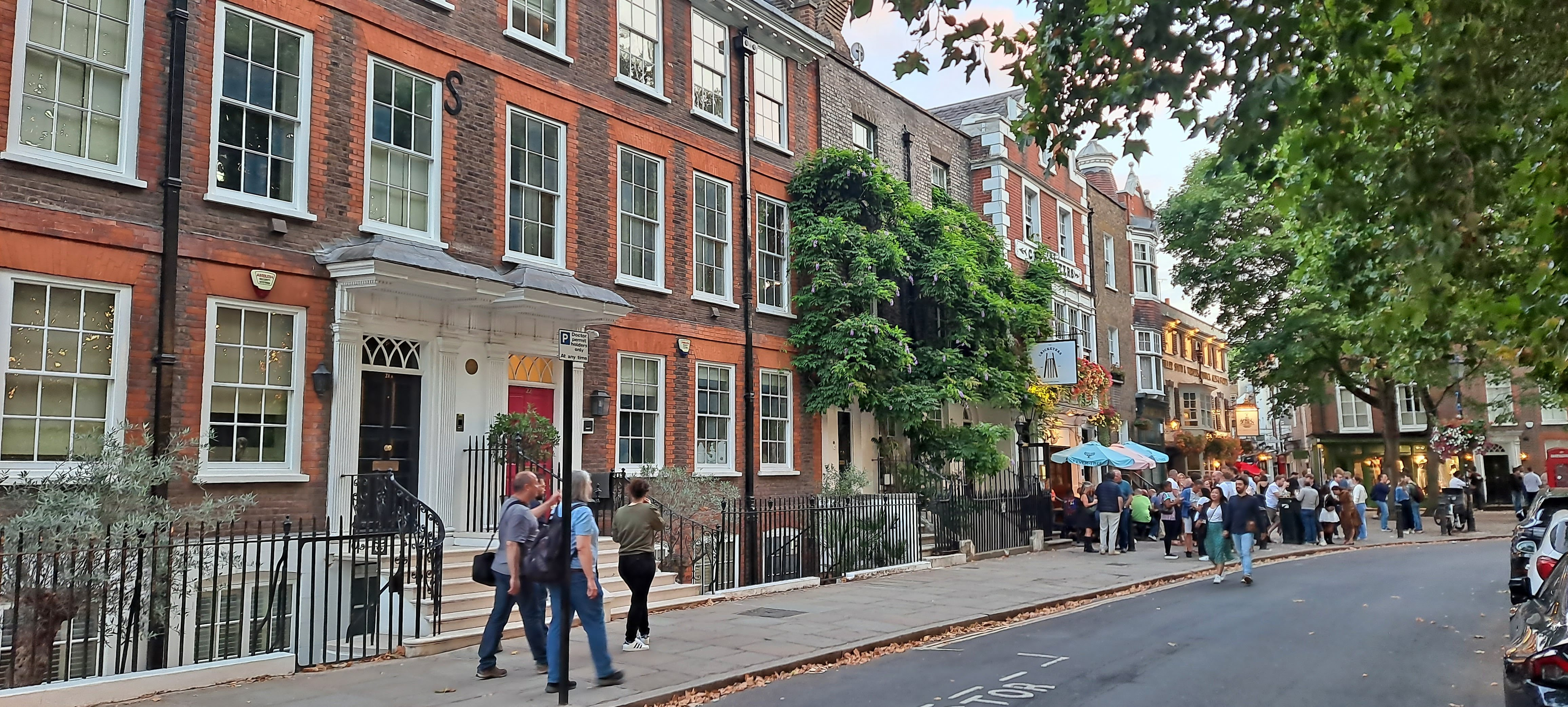
South-east corner of Richmond Green

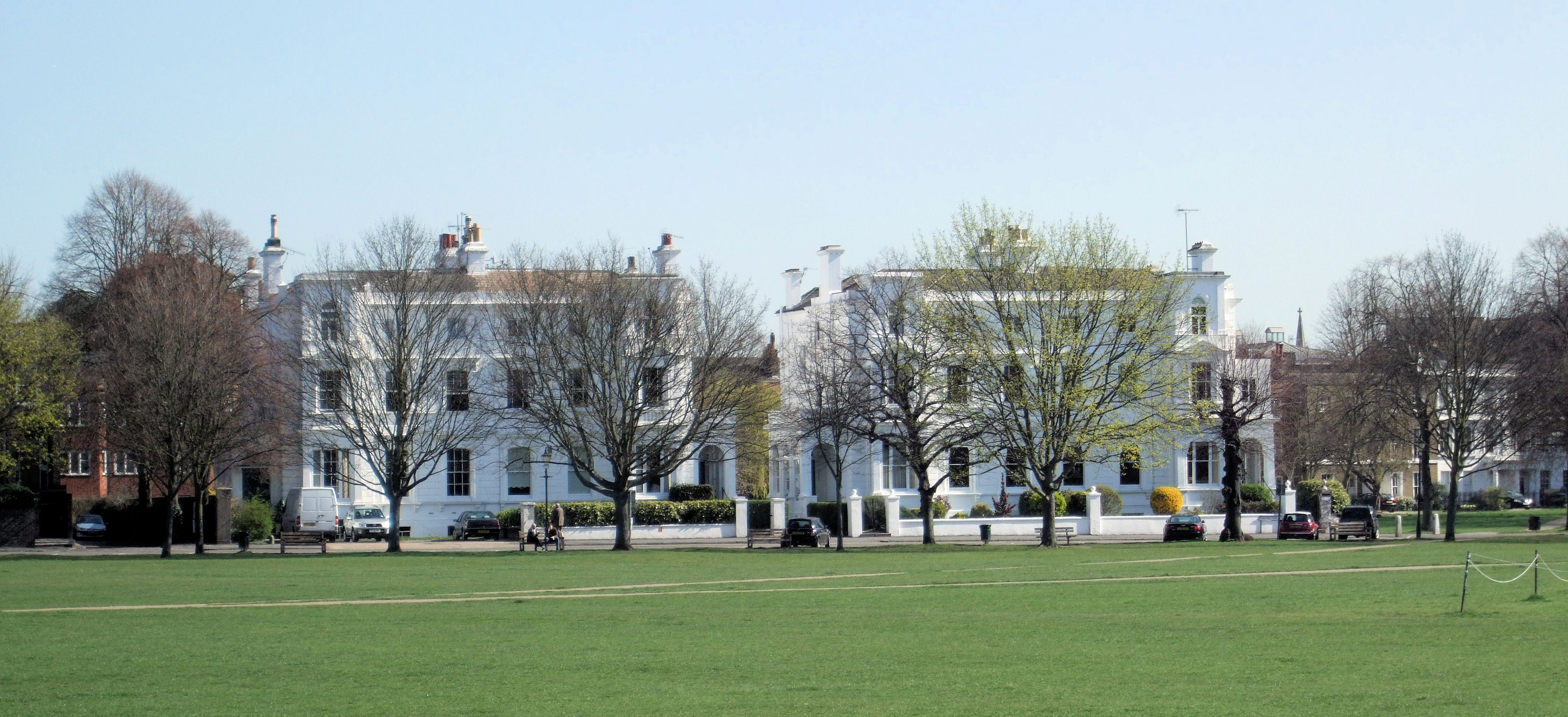
Portland Place, Richmond Green

Richmond Green has been described as "one of the most beautiful urban greens surviving anywhere in England". It is roughly square in shape, and its open grassland, framed with broadleaf trees, extends to roughly twelve acres (4.9 hectares). On summer weekends and public holidays the Green attracts many residents and visitors. It has a long history of hosting sporting events; tournaments and archery contests took place on the Green from the 16th century onwards, and there have been cricket matches since the mid-18th century, continuing to the present day. One of the first recorded inter-county cricket matches was played on Richmond Green in 1730 between Surrey and Middlesex.

To the west of the Green is Old Palace Lane, which leads to the Thames. One of the oldest roads in Richmond, it was originally a route from the river, where goods were loaded and unloaded by crane, to the "tradesmen's entrance" to Richmond Palace. Adjoining to the left is the renowned terrace of well-preserved three-storey houses known as Maids of Honour Row. These were built in 1724 for the maids of honour (trusted royal wardrobe servants) of Queen Caroline, the queen consort of George II. As a child, the Victorian explorer Richard Burton lived at No. 2.

Today the northern, western and southern sides of the Green are residential while the eastern side, linking with George Street, is largely retail and commercial. Public buildings line the eastern side of the Little Green and pubs and cafés cluster in the corner by Paved Court and Golden Court – two of a number of alleys that lead from the Green to the main commercial thoroughfare of George Street. These alleys are lined with mostly privately owned boutiques.

=== Richmond Hill ===
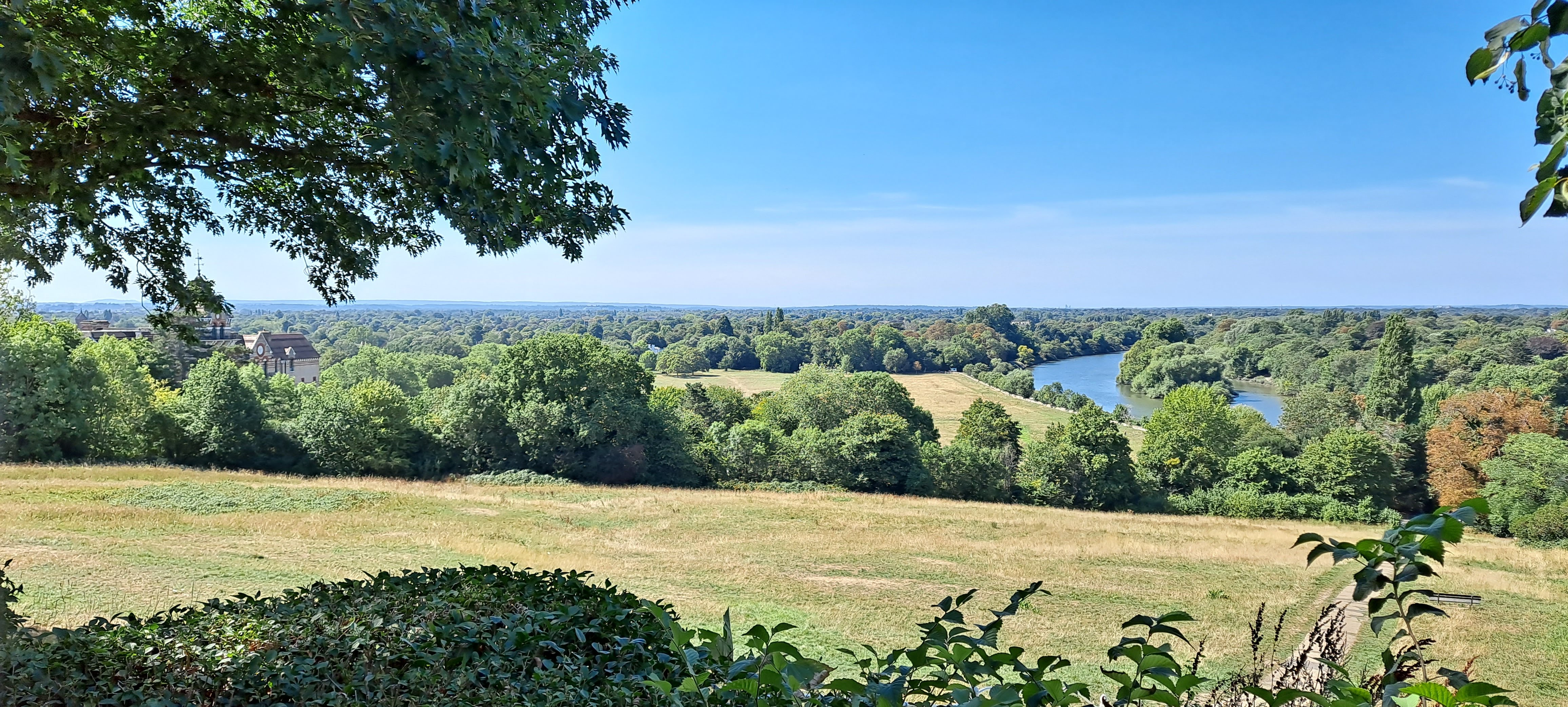
The famous south-western view from Richmond Hill, seen in early summer

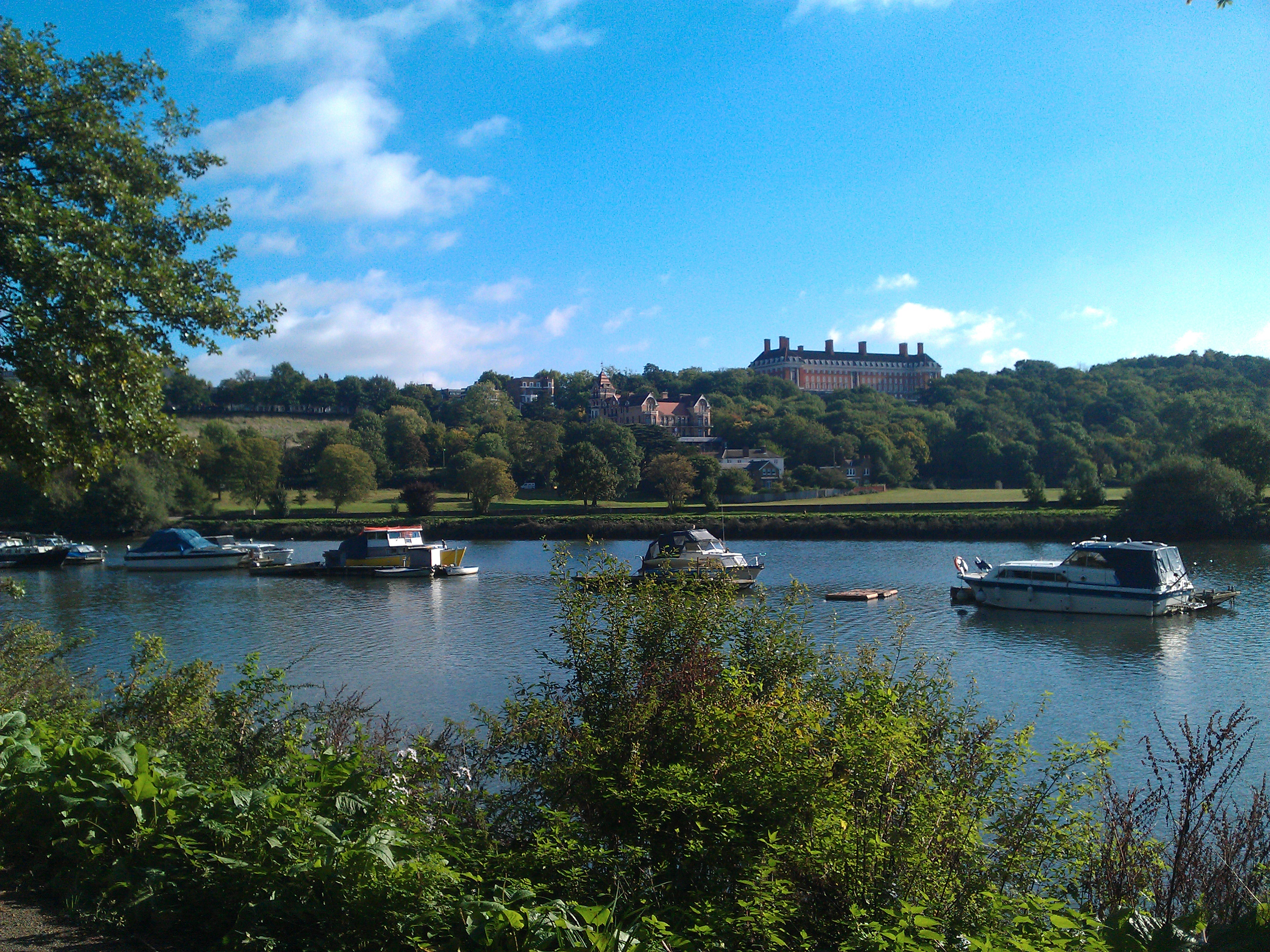
Riverside view from the Twickenham bank of the Thames with the former Royal Star and Garter Home on Richmond Hill

The view from the top of Richmond Hill to Windsor has long been famous, inspiring paintings by leading artists including J. M. W. Turner and Sir Joshua Reynolds and also poetry. One particularly grand description of the view can be found in Sir Walter Scott's novel The Heart of Midlothian (1818). It is a common misconception that the 18th-century song "Lass of Richmond Hill" relates to this hill, but the young woman in the song lived in Hill House at Richmond in the Yorkshire Dales.

Apart from the great rugby stadium at Twickenham and the aircraft landing and taking off from Heathrow, the scene has changed little in two hundred years. The view from Richmond Hill now forms part of the Thames Landscape Strategy which aims to protect and enhance this section of the river corridor into London.

A broad, gravelled walk runs along the crest of the hill and is set back off the road, lined with benches, allowing pedestrians an uninterrupted view across the Thames valley with visitors' information boards describing points of interest. Sloping down to the River Thames are the Terrace Gardens that were laid out in the 1880s and were extended to the river some 40 years later.

A commanding feature on the hill is the former Royal Star and Garter Home; in 2013 it was sold for development and converted into residential apartments. During the First World War an old hotel on this site, the Star and Garter, which had been a popular place of entertainment in the 18th and 19th centuries but had closed in 1906, was taken over and used as a military hospital. In the early 1920s it was replaced by a new building providing accommodation and nursing facilities for 180 seriously injured servicemen. This was sold in 2013 after the charitable trust running the home concluded that the building no longer met modern requirements and could not be easily or economically upgraded. The trust opened an additional home in Solihull, West Midlands, and the remaining residents in Richmond moved in 2013 to a new purpose-built building in Surbiton.

=== Richmond Park ===
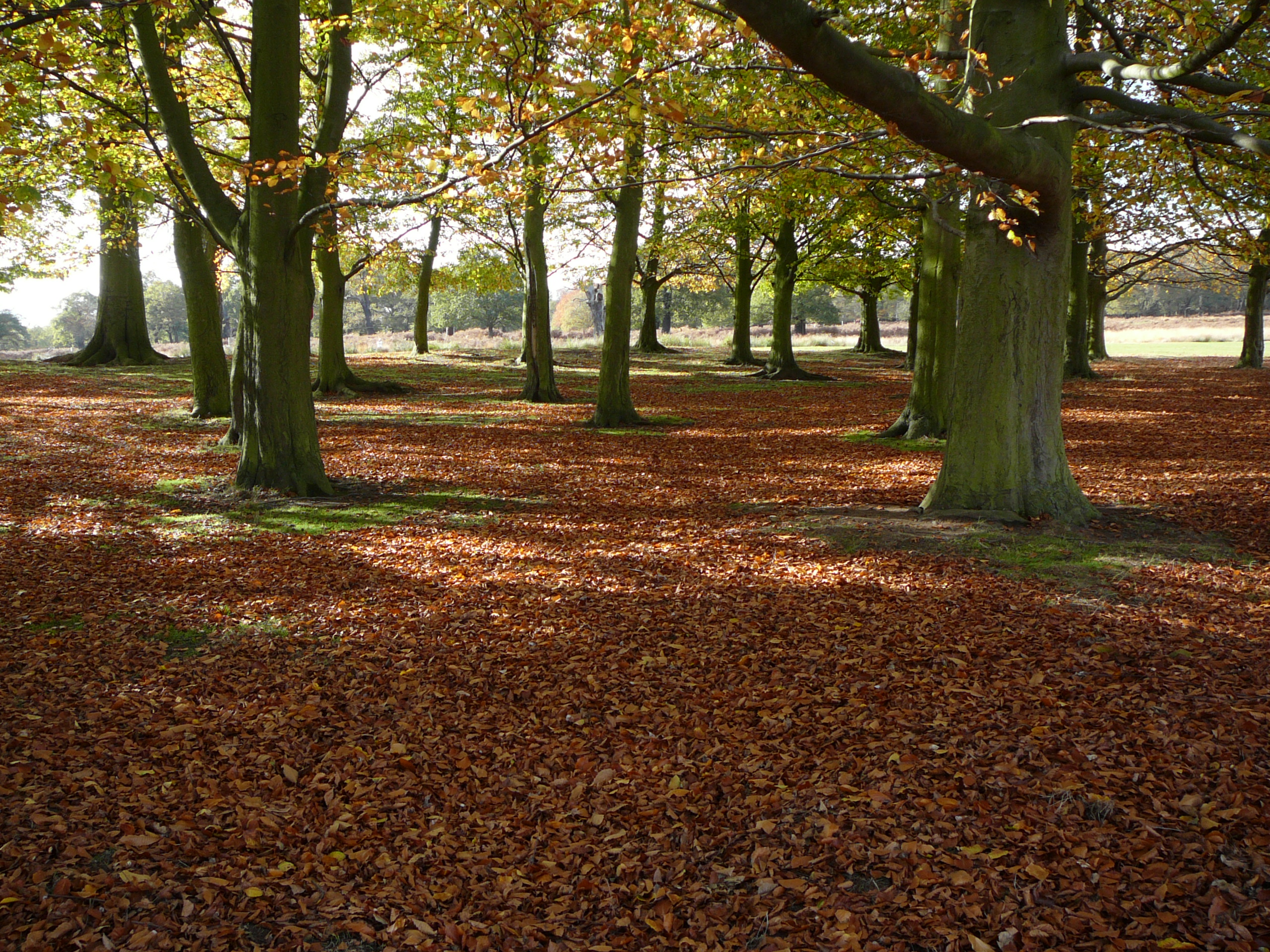
Richmond Park is a national nature reserve.

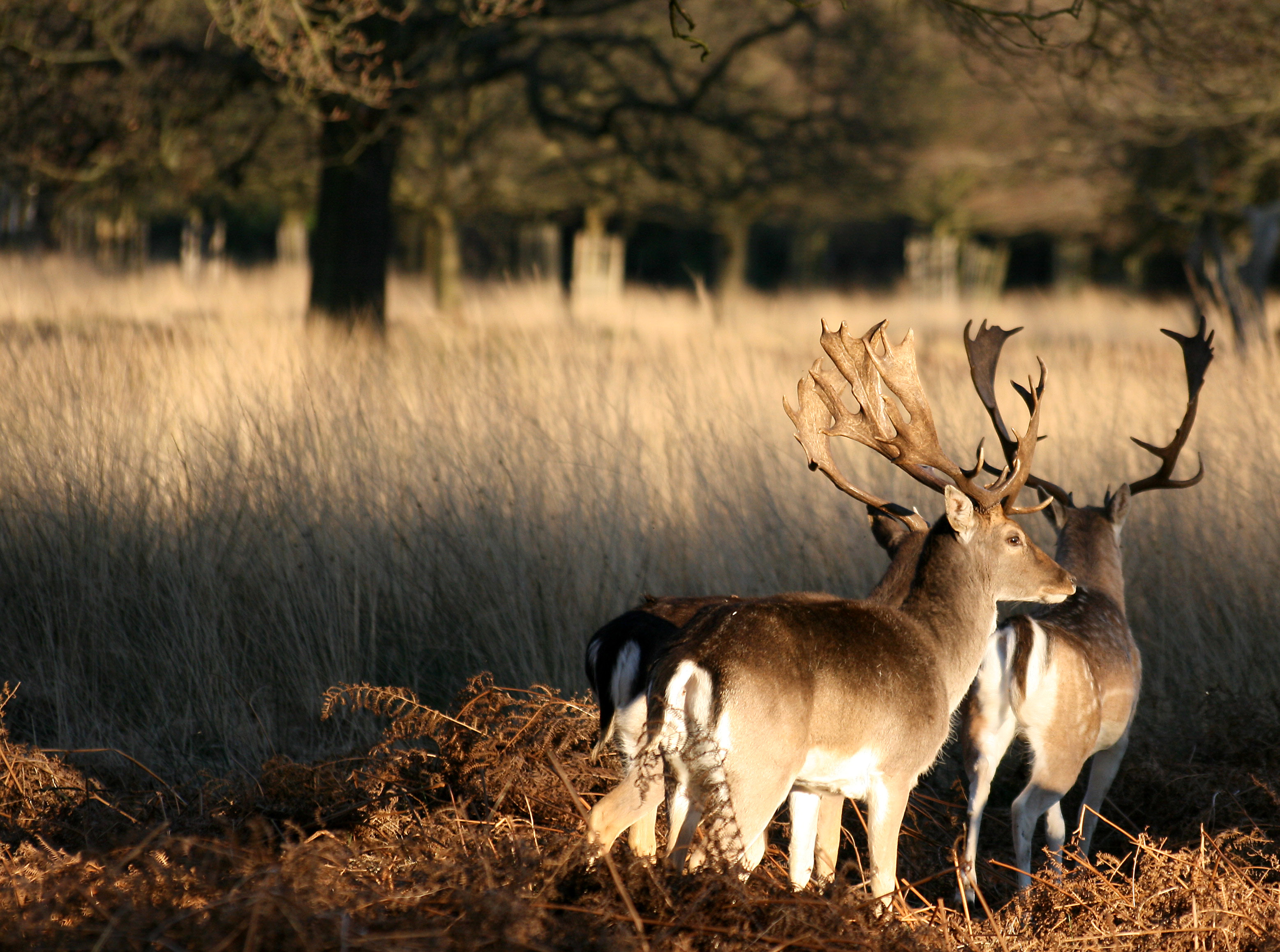
Fallow deer in Richmond Park

At the top of Richmond Hill, opposite the former Royal Star and Garter Home, sits the Richmond Gate entrance to Richmond Park. The park is a national nature reserve, a Special Area of Conservation (SAC), and a Site of Special Scientific Interest (SSSI). The largest of London's Royal Parks, it was created by Charles I in 1634 as a deer park and now has over 600 red and fallow deer. Richmond Gate remains open to traffic between dawn and dusk.

King Henry's Mound, a Grade II listed Neolithic burial barrow, is the highest point within the park. From the mound there is a protected view, established in 1710, of St Paul's Cathedral in the City of London over 10 miles (16 km) to the east. At various times the mound's name has been connected with Henry VIII or with his father Henry VII. However, there is no evidence to support the legend that Henry VIII stood on the mound to watch for the sign from St Paul's that Anne Boleyn had been executed at the Tower and that he was then free to marry Jane Seymour.

King Henry's Mound is in the grounds of Pembroke Lodge, which is Grade II listed. In 1847 this house became the home of the then Prime Minister, Lord John Russell, who conducted much government business there and entertained Queen Victoria, foreign royalty, aristocrats, writers (Dickens, Thackeray, Longfellow, Tennyson) and other notable people of the time, including Giuseppe Garibaldi. It was later the childhood home of Lord John Russell's grandson, the philosopher, mathematician and social critic Bertrand Russell. It is now a popular restaurant with views across the Thames Valley.

Built as a hunting lodge for George II by the architect Roger Morris, White Lodge was completed in 1730. Its many famous residents have included members of the Royal Family. The future king Edward VIII was born at White Lodge in 1894; his brother Prince Albert, Duke of York (the future George VI) and the Duchess of York (later Queen Elizabeth the Queen Mother) lived there in the 1920s. The Royal Ballet School (formerly Sadler's Wells Ballet) has been based since 1955 at the lodge, where younger ballet students continue to be trained.

Also in the park and Grade II listed is Thatched House Lodge, which is still a royal residence. Since 1963 it has been the home of Princess Alexandra, The Honourable Lady Ogilvy, a first cousin of Queen Elizabeth II. General Dwight D Eisenhower, who later became President of the United States, lived there during the Second World War.

=== Museums and galleries ===
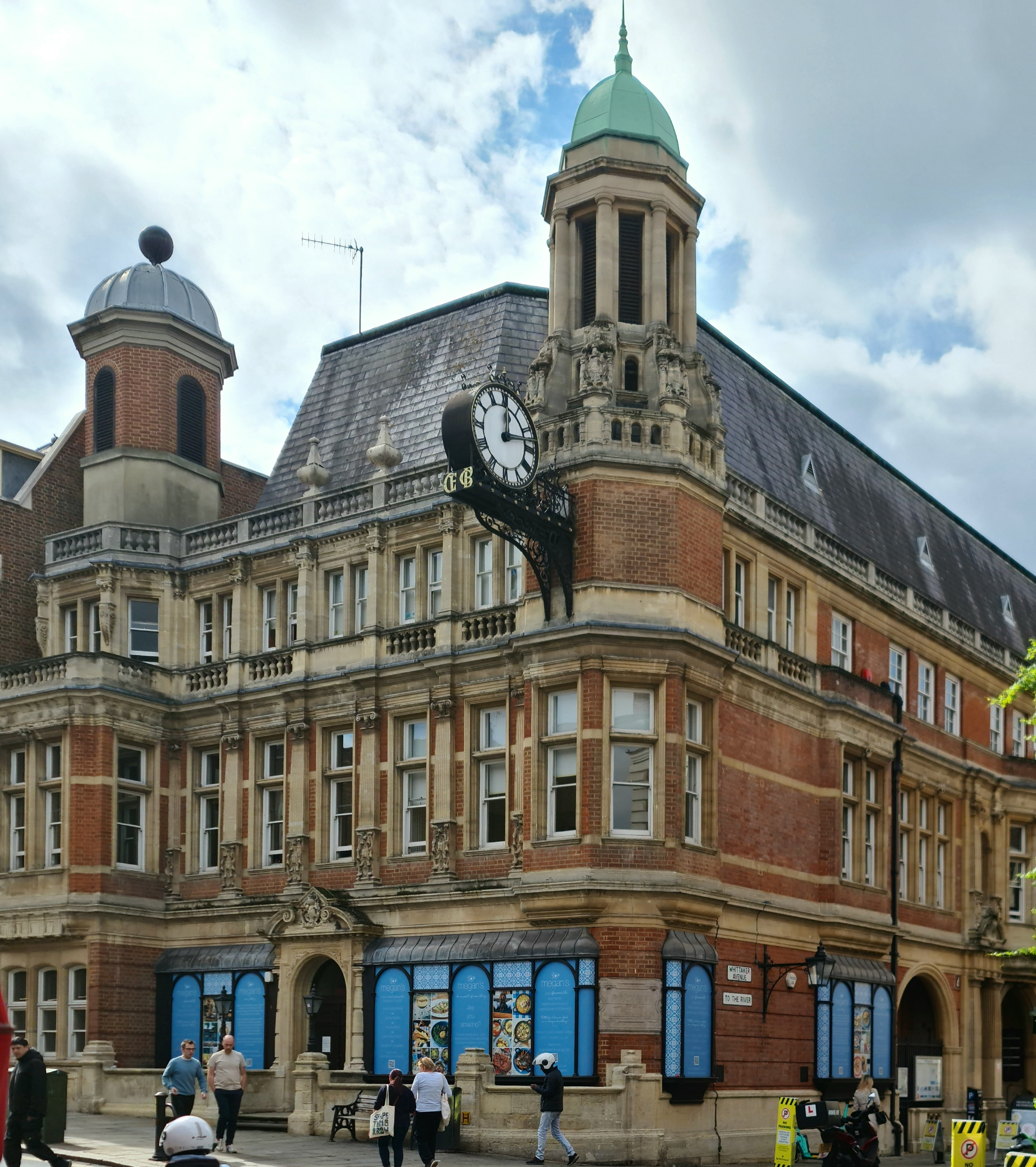
Richmond's Old Town Hall now houses Richmond Reference Library, the Museum of Richmond and the Riverside Gallery.

The Museum of Richmond, in Richmond's Old Town Hall, close to Richmond Bridge, has displays relating to the history of Richmond, Ham, Petersham and Kew. Its rotating exhibitions, education activities and a programme of events cover the whole of the modern borough. The museum's highlights include 16th-century glass from Richmond Palace and a painting, The Terrace and View from Richmond Hill, Surrey by Dutch draughtsman and painter Leonard Knyff (1650–1722), which is part of the Richmond upon Thames Borough Art Collection. Admission to the museum is free.

The Riverside Gallery, also at the Old Town Hall, features temporary exhibitions by local artists including paintings, prints and photographs. Admission is free.

=== Theatres and cinemas ===
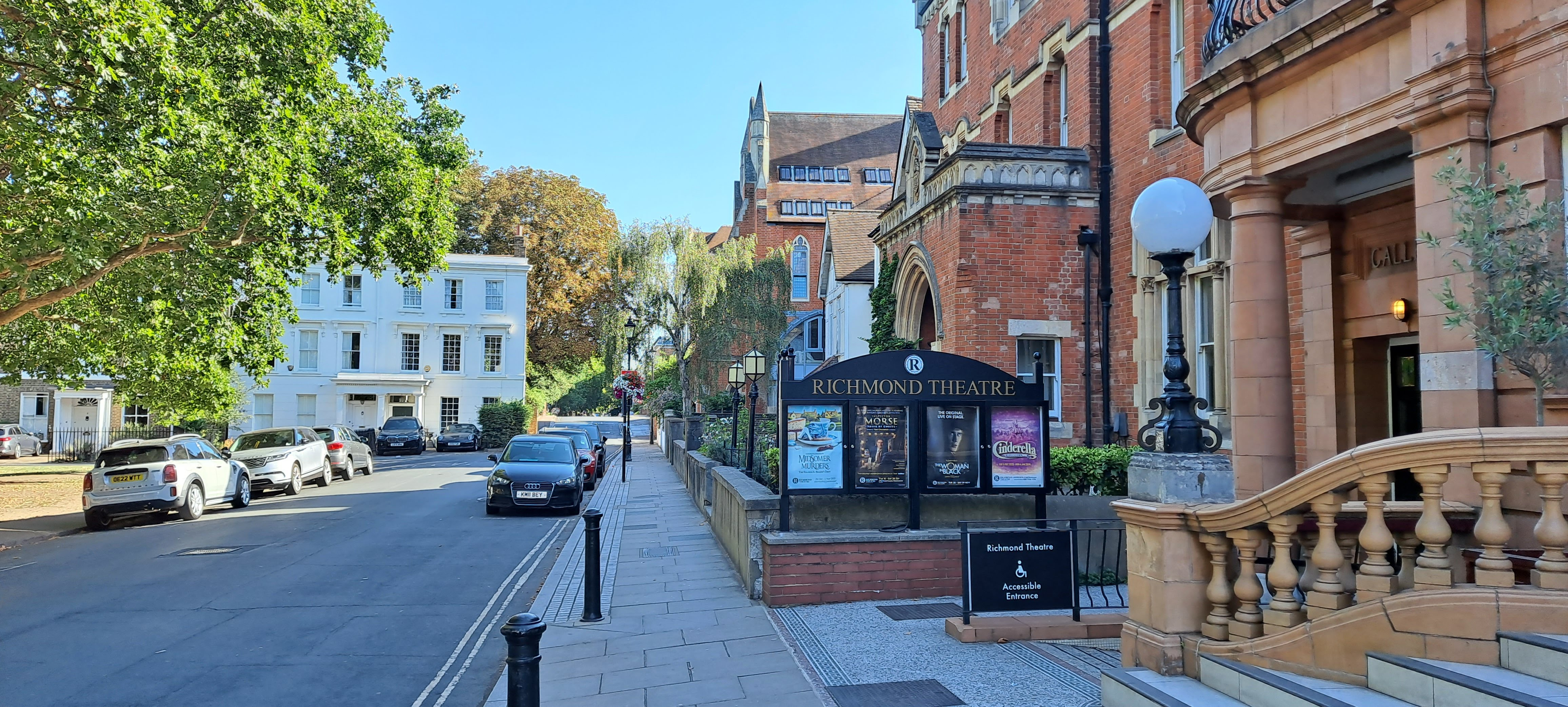
Richmond Lending Library and Richmond Theatre

Richmond has two theatres. Richmond Theatre on Little Green is a Grade II* listed late Victorian structure designed by Frank Matcham and restored and extended by Carl Toms in 1990. The theatre has a weekly schedule of plays and musicals, usually given by professional touring companies, and pre-West End shows can sometimes be seen. There is a Christmas and New Year pantomime tradition and many of Britain's greatest music hall and pantomime performers have appeared here.

Almost opposite Richmond railway station is the Orange Tree Theatre, which was founded in 1971 in a room above the Orange Tree pub. As audience numbers increased, there was pressure to find a more accommodating space and, in 1991, the company moved to its current premises within a disused 1867 primary school, built in Victorian Gothic style. The 172-seat theatre was designed specifically as a theatre-in-the-round. The theatre has acquired a national reputation for the quality of its work for staging new plays, and for discovering undeservedly forgotten old plays and neglected classics.

The town has two cinemas, the arthouse Curzon in Water Lane and an Odeon cinema which has seven screens in two locations, one of them in Red Lion Street. The Odeon on Hill Street, built in 1930 in Art Deco style, is Grade II listed and is the only high street building visible from Richmond Bridge.

=== Historic public houses ===
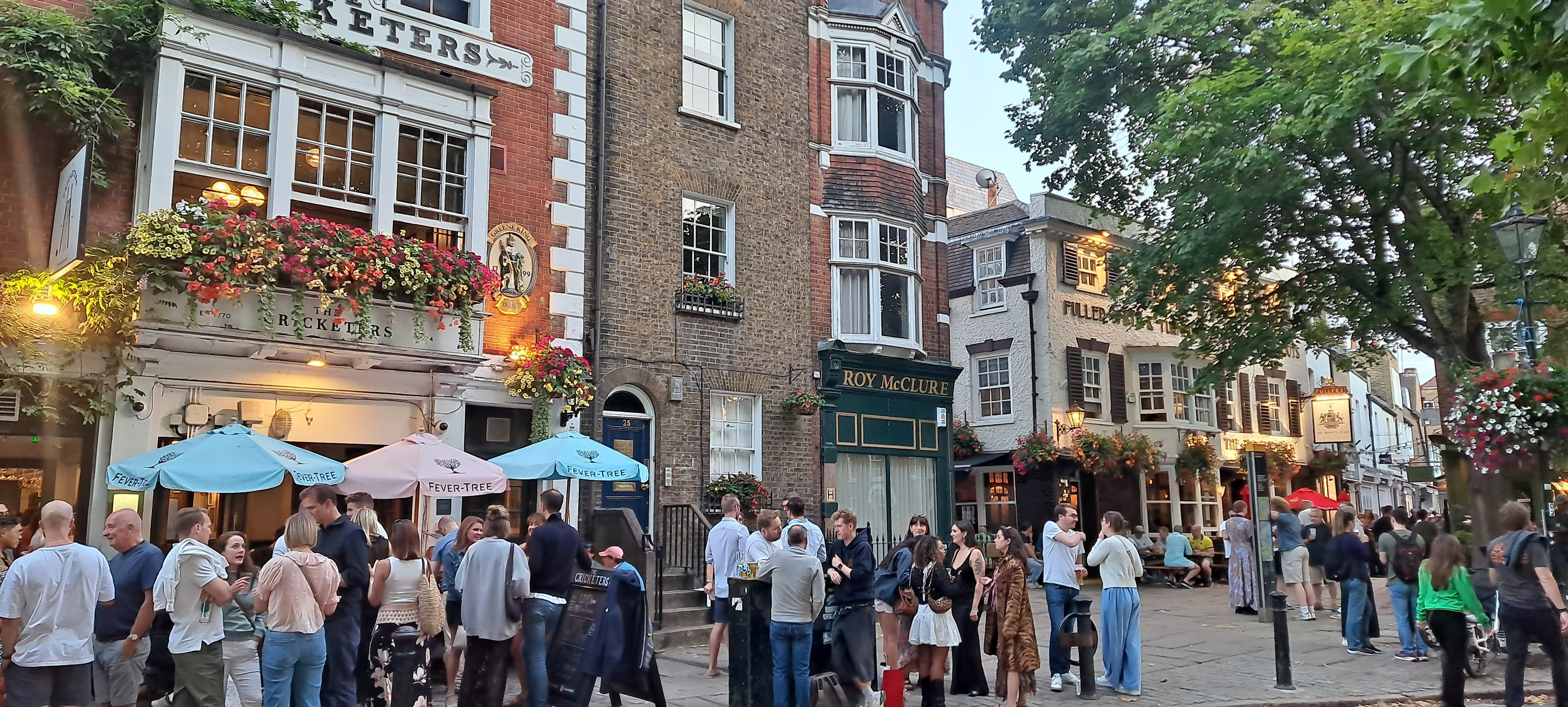
The Cricketers & The Prince's Head at Richmond Green

There are numerous public houses and bars throughout Richmond's town centre, and along the river and up the hill, with enough variety to cater to most tastes. One of the oldest is The Cricketers, serving beer since 1770, though the original building was burned down in 1844. It was soon replaced by the present building. Samuel Whitbread, founder of Whitbread Brewery, part-owned it with the Collins family who had a brewery in Water Lane, close to the old palace. Grade II listed pubs include the White Cross, the Old Ship and the Britannia.

=== Restaurants and cafes ===
Many of the major restaurant chains can be found within 500 metres of Richmond Bridge. There are also plenty of privately owned restaurants with culinary offerings from around the world, including French, German, Indian, Japanese, Korean, Russian, Spanish and Thai.

The Bingham Riverhouse hotel was awarded its first Michelin star in 2010. Overlooking the Thames, it is in a Grade II listed building dating from about 1760.

== Societies ==
Richmond Local History Society
- Abbreviation: RLHS
- Formation: 1985 (Note: The Society originated as the History and Archaeology Section of The Richmond Society, launched in April 1975. It became an independent society in 1985. Cloake, John (July 2014). "Forty Years of Richmond History". Richmond Local History Society.)
- Founder: John Cloake
- Legal status: registered charity (no. 292907)
- Region served: Richmond, Kew, Petersham and Ham
- Members: 400
- Chair: Dr Simon Targett
- Main organ: Richmond History (journal); The Richmond Local History Society Magazine (published three times a year)
- Budget: £11,260
- Staff: none
- Website: richmondhistory.org.uk

The Richmond Society
- Formation: 1957
- Type: civic society and conservation group
- Legal status: charitable incorporated organisation (no. 1169079)
- Region served: Richmond, Kew, Petersham and Ham
- Members: 1100
- Chair: Louise Fluker
- Main organ: The Richmond Society Quarterly Newsletter
- Budget: £91,000
- Staff: none
- Website: richmondsociety.org.uk

The Richmond Local History Society explores the local history of Richmond, Kew, Petersham and Ham. It organises a programme of talks on history topics and visits to buildings of historical interest. The Society publishes a magazine three times a year, an indexed journal (Richmond History) and other publications.

The Richmond Society is a civic society and conservation group which was founded in 1957 by a group of local residents, originally to fight against the proposal to install modern lamp posts around Richmond Green. It acts as a pressure group concerned with preserving Richmond's natural and built environment, monitoring and influencing development proposals and presenting annual awards for buildings and other schemes which make a positive contribution to Richmond. It also organises meetings on topics of local interest and a programme of guided walks and visits, and publishes a quarterly newsletter. The Society's patrons are: Anita Anand; Professor Ian Bruce; John, Lord Lee of Trafford; Sir Trevor McDonald; Ronny, Baroness van Dedem; and Lord Watson of Richmond.

== Leisure activities ==
With a third of the borough being green and open space, Richmond has much to offer in the way of leisure activities.

=== Boating ===
Skiffs (fixed seat boats) can be hired by the hour from local boat builders close to the bridge, with opportunities to row upstream towards the historic properties Ham House and Marble Hill House. Richmond Canoe Club, founded in 1944 and now one of Britain's biggest canoe clubs, is also on the Thames towpath south of Richmond Bridge.

=== Cycling ===
Richmond is part of the London Cycle Network, offering on and off-road cycle paths throughout the area, including along the Thames towpath and in Richmond Park.

=== Equestrian activities ===
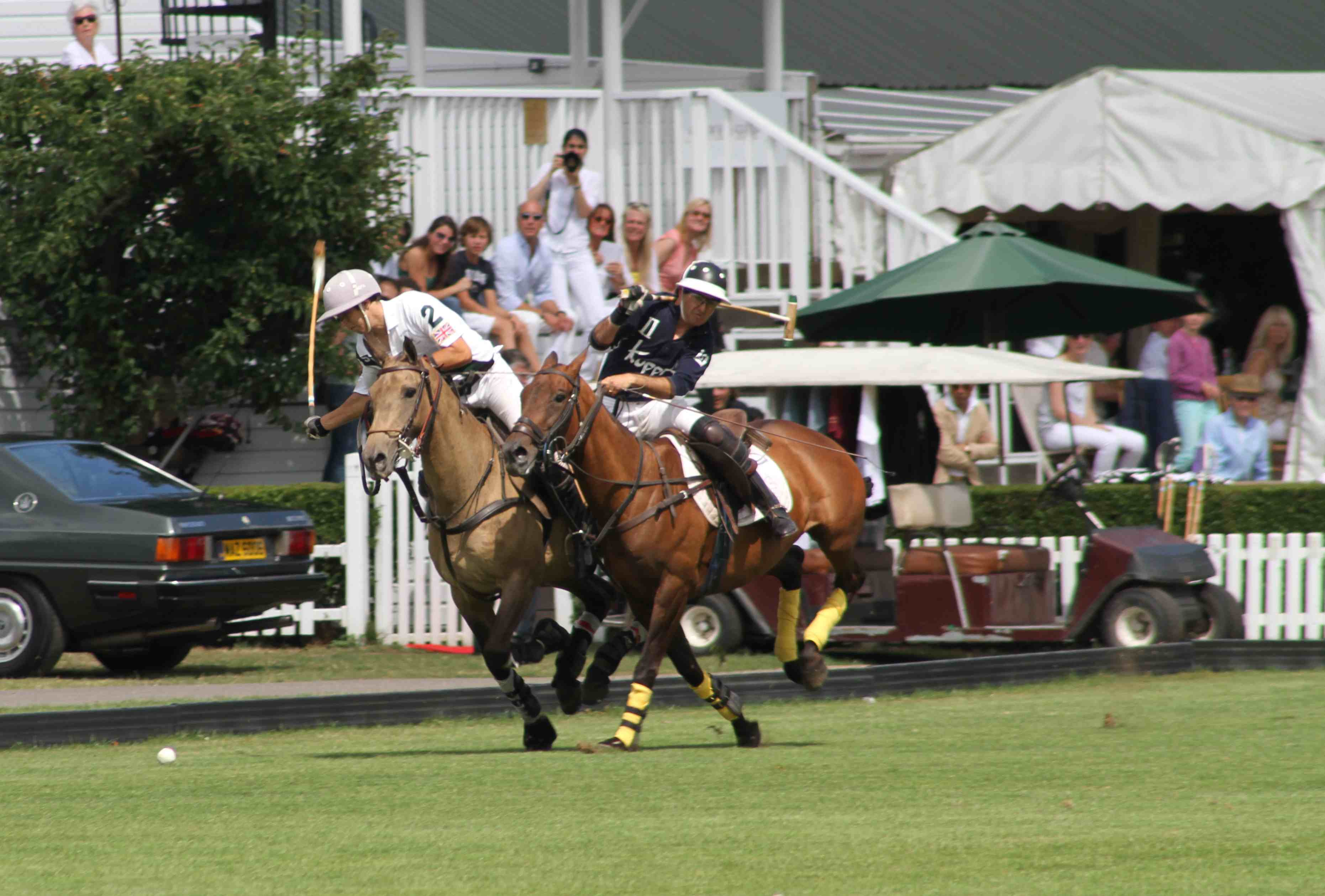
Polo match at the Ham Polo Club

Richmond Park also has bridle paths, and horses can be rented from a number of stables around the perimeter of the park.

Ham Polo Club is on the Petersham Road at the bottom of Richmond Hill. The club was established in 1926 and is now the only polo club in London; it is popular with picnickers during the summer months.

=== Field sports ===
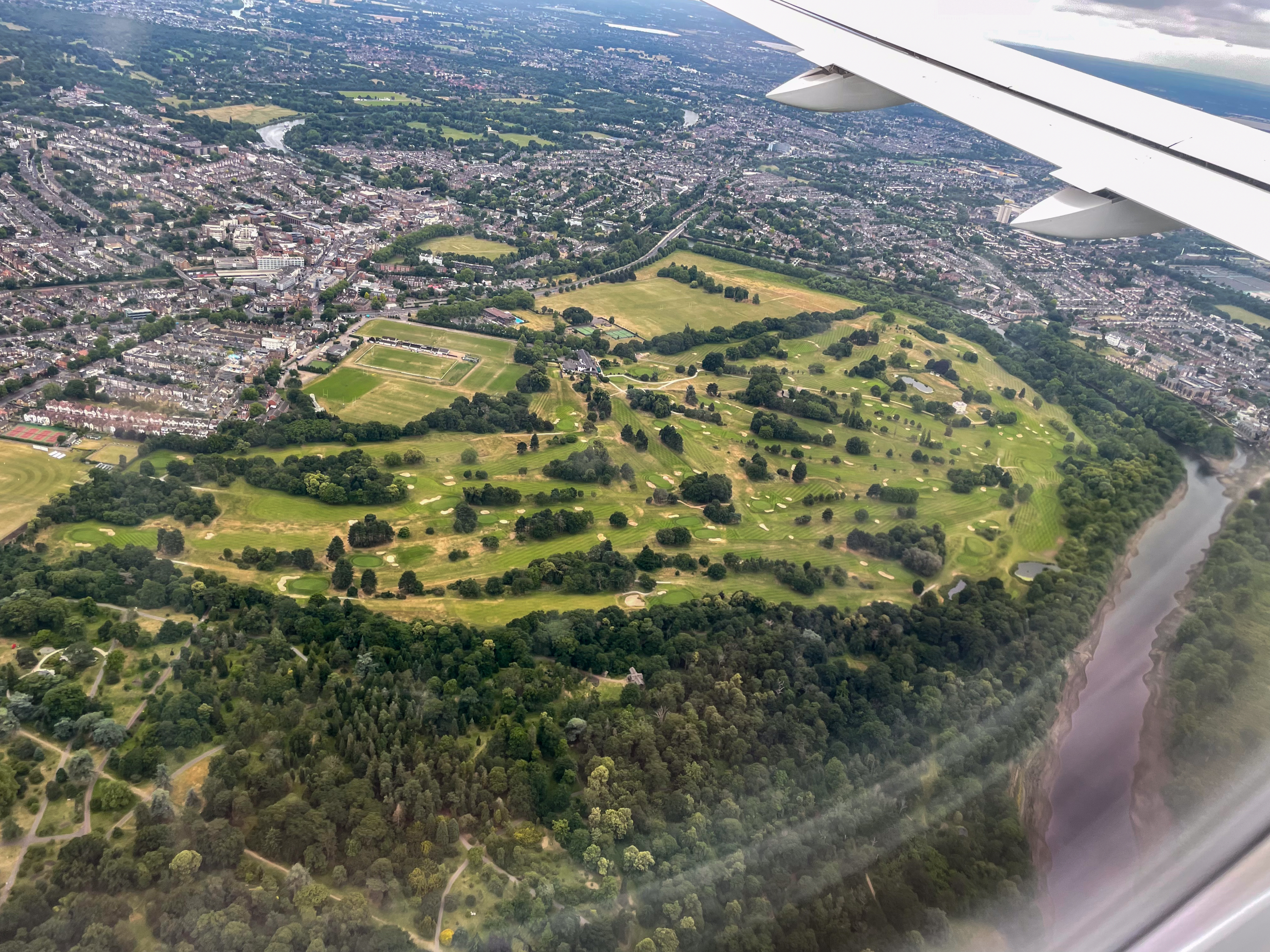
The Royal Mid-Surrey Golf Club's courses seen from an aeroplane

Old Deer Park provides open recreation areas, football, rugby and other pitches, and has a leisure centre, Pools on the Park. The leisure centre has 33m indoor and outdoor pools and a fitness centre.

The park also includes the Royal Mid-Surrey Golf Club with both golf and pitch and putt courses, and the Richmond Athletic Ground, home to Richmond Rugby Club and London Scottish rugby clubs.

An additional sports ground at Old Deer Park is home to both the Richmond Cricket Club and the London Welsh rugby union club, as well as tennis courts and a bowling green. The Prince's Head Cricket Club holds fixtures on Richmond Green throughout the summer.

Richmond Hockey Club, a founder member of England Hockey, was established in 1874 and was based from then until 2001 at Old Deer Park. It now plays at the University of Westminster Sports Grounds in Chiswick and competes in the Men's England Hockey League and the London Hockey League.

=== Running ===
5K Parkrun events take place every Saturday morning at Old Deer Park and Richmond Park.

== Demography and housing ==
2011 Census homes
Ward	Detached	Semi-detached	Terraced	Flats and apartments	Caravans/temporary/ mobile homes/houseboats	Shared between households
North Richmond	142	1,093	1,546	1,963	0	27
South Richmond	384	653	1,092	2,995	0	44

2011 Census households
Ward	Population	Households	% Owned outright	% Owned with a loan	Area (hectares)
North Richmond	10,649	5,168	26	30	272
South Richmond	10,820	4,047	28	24	266

=== German residents ===
The town and the borough of Richmond have been popular destinations for German expatriates and German British since at least the 19th century. Richmond resident Sir Max Waechter, a German-born businessman and advocate of a federal Europe, donated Glover's Island to the local council in 1900. The German School London opened in nearby Petersham in 1971, continuing the popularity of Richmond for German families settling in London.

== Transport ==
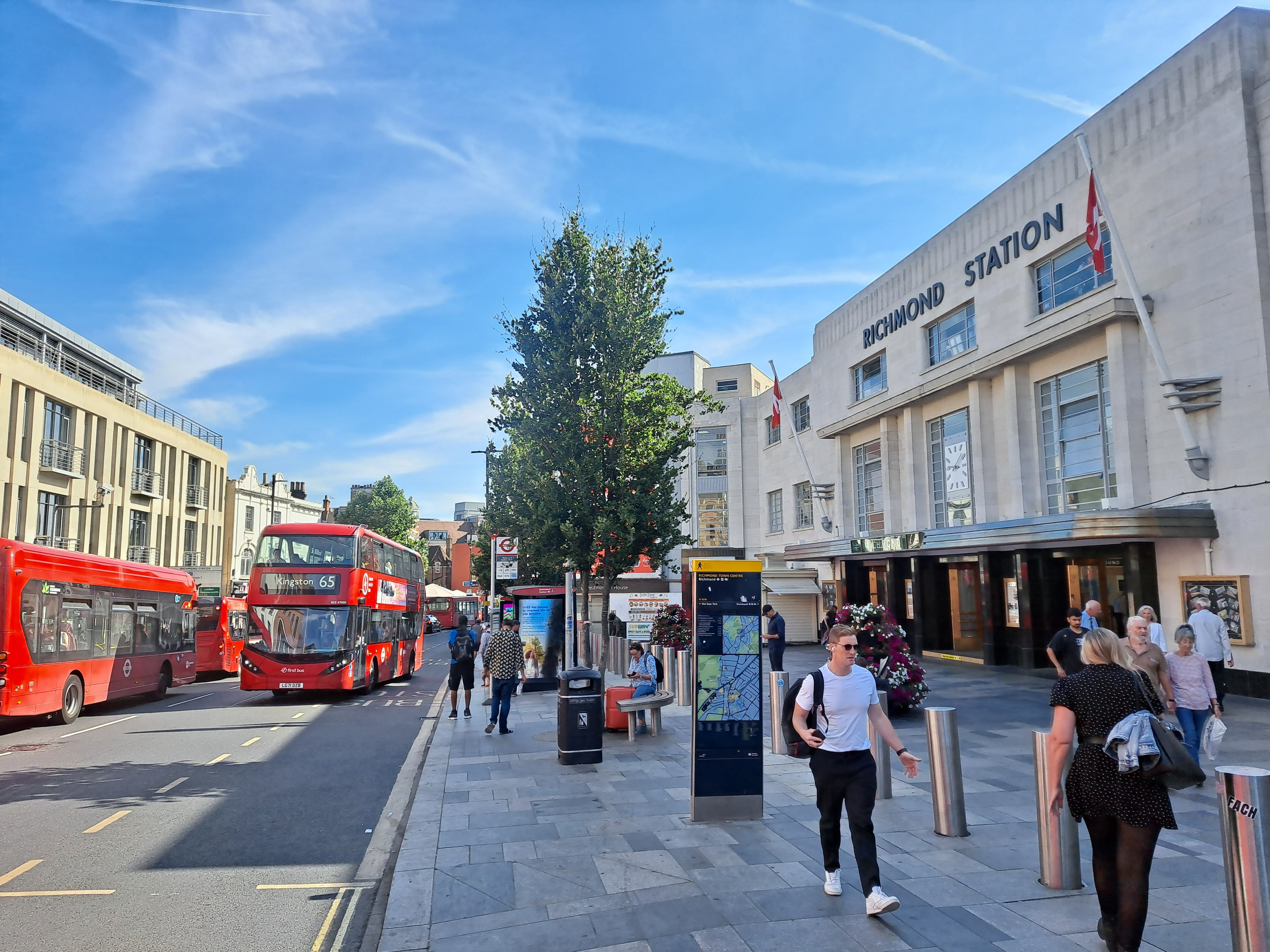
Richmond station

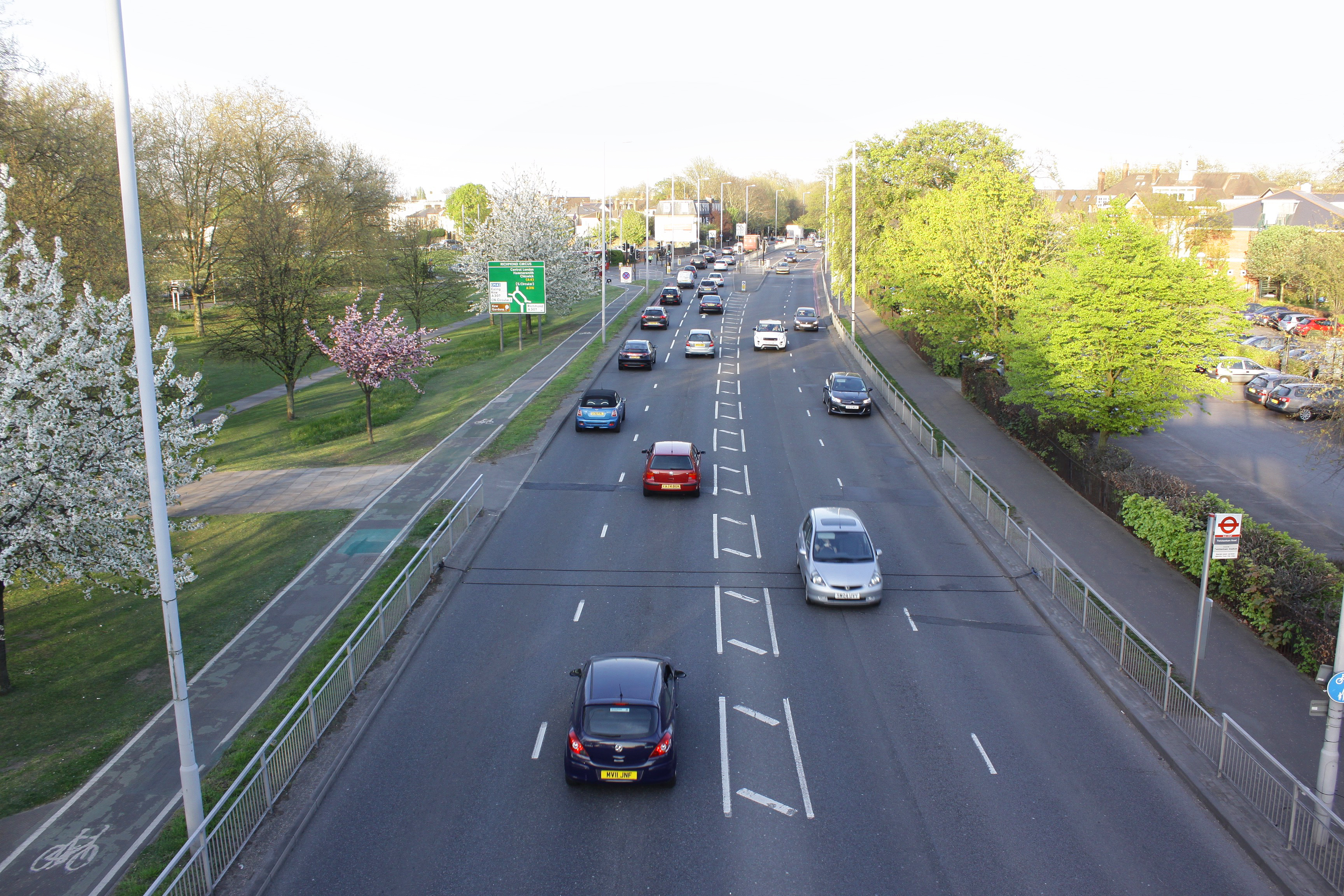
The A316 road in Richmond cuts through Old Deer Park, separating the town from most of the park.

According to the 2011 census, thirty per cent of Richmond households do not have a car or van. This figure is well above the borough average of 24%, which may be related to the excellent transport links in the area and the lower proportion of families as reported in the 2001 census. A half of households have one car, in line with the borough average.

=== Rail ===
- Richmond station
  - London Underground (District line) towards Kew Gardens and Upminster
  - London Overground (Mildmay line) towards Kew Gardens, Willesden Junction and Stratford
  - Waterloo to Reading line and three branch line services call at the station en route to Windsor and Weybridge. One service calls at Richmond station on its return to the central London terminus via Kingston upon Thames.
- North Sheen station
  - South Western Railway services on the Waterloo to Reading line

=== Buses ===
Richmond is served by a number of Transport for London bus routes.

=== Roads ===
Richmond's main arterial road, the A316, running between Chiswick and the M3 motorway, bisects Old Deer Park and the town to its north. The town's only dual carriageway, it was built in the 1930s, cutting off Richmond from Kew and entailing the construction of Twickenham Bridge. This road expands into three lanes and motorway status three and five miles west respectively.

The town centre is on the A307, which used to be the main link between London and north-west Surrey, and was previously one of the main routes of the Portsmouth Road before that was diverted; and on the A305, which runs from East Sheen and over Richmond Bridge to Twickenham.

== Nearest hospitals ==
- Queen Mary's Hospital is a community hospital in Roehampton in the London Borough of Wandsworth. It is run by St George's University Hospitals NHS Foundation Trust.

The nearest acute hospitals, both of which include accident and emergency departments and maternity units, are:

- Kingston Hospital in Kingston upon Thames, which is managed by the Kingston and Richmond NHS Foundation Trust.
- West Middlesex Hospital in Isleworth, operated by the Chelsea and Westminster Hospital NHS Foundation Trust.

== Places of worship ==
Name	Denomination/affiliation	Address	Website	Image
Bethlehem Chapel, Richmond	Independent Calvinist	Church Terrace, Richmond TW10 6SE	website	
Christian Fellowship in Richmond	Evangelical Alliance	Halford House, 27 Halford Road, Richmond TW10 6AW	website	
Duke Street Church, Richmond	Conservative Evangelicalism	Duke Street, Richmond TW9 1DH	website	
Ebenezer Strict Baptist Chapel, Richmond	Strict Baptist	17 Jocelyn Road, Richmond TW9 2TJ		
First Church of Christ, Scientist, Richmond	Christian Science	35 Sheen Road, Richmond TW9 1AD	website	
Holy Trinity, Richmond	Church of England	Sheen Park, Richmond TW9 1UP	website	
Life Church, Richmond	Evangelical Alliance	The Vineyard, Richmond TW10 6AQ	website	
Our Lady Queen of Peace Church, Richmond	Roman Catholic	222 Sheen Road, Richmond TW10 5AN	website	
Raleigh Road United Church	Methodist & United Reformed	Raleigh Road, Richmond TW9 2DX	website	
Richmond and Putney Unitarian Church	Unitarian	Ormond Road, Richmond TW10 6TH	website	
Richmond Quaker Meeting House	Quakers	1 Retreat Road, Richmond TW9 1NN	website	
Richmond Synagogue	Orthodox Judaism	Lichfield Gardens, Richmond TW9 1AP	website	
St Elizabeth of Portugal Church	Roman Catholic	The Vineyard, Richmond TW10 6AQ	website	
Chapel of St Francis, Hickey's Almshouses	Church of England	Sheen Road, Richmond TW9 1XB		
St John the Divine, Richmond	Church of England	Kew Road, Richmond TW9 2TN	website	
St Mary Magdalene, Richmond	Church of England	Red Lion Street, Richmond TW9 1RE	website	
St Matthias Church, Richmond	Church of England	Friars Stile Road, Richmond TW10 6PN	website	

== Almshouses ==
Richmond has ten groups of almshouses. Six are of historical interest and some were founded in the 16th century. They are all managed by The Richmond Charities, which also manages Candler Almshouses and Wright's Almshouses in Twickenham, Christchurch Road Almshouses in East Sheen and Colston's Almshouses and Juxon's Almshouses in Mortlake.

Name	Location	Number of almshouses	History	Image
Bishop Duppa's Almshouses	The Vineyard	10	The original almshouses were founded in 1661 (on Richmond Hill) by Brian Duppa, Bishop of Winchester. They were rebuilt in 1851 on the present site and are Grade II listed.	
Church Estate Almshouses	Sheen Road	10	Most of the buildings, designed by William Crawford Stow and now Grade II listed, date from 1843 but the charity that built them is known to have existed in Queen Elizabeth I's time and may have much earlier origins.	
Hickey's Almshouses	Between Sheen Road and St Mary's Grove	50	William Hickey, who died in 1727, left the income of several properties on Richmond Hill in trust to provide pensions for six men and ten women. In 1822 the charity's funds were boosted by a major donation from Elizabeth Doughty. Twenty almshouses, designed by Lewis Vulliamy, and a chapel and two gate lodge cottages, were built in 1834 and are Grade II* listed. The property, which includes another 29 buildings behind the almshouses, now consists of 49 flats and cottages, a laundry and a workshop.	
Houblon's Almshouses	Worple Way	11	Now Grade II* listed, these were founded in 1757 by Rebecca and Susanna Houblon (who built nine almshouses). A further two almshouses were added in 1857.	
Michel's Almshouses	The Vineyard	17	These were founded in the 17th century by Humphrey Michel. The original ten almshouses, built in 1696, were rebuilt in 1811. Another six almshouses were added in 1858. They are Grade II listed.	
Queen Elizabeth's Almshouses	The Vineyard	4	These were founded by Sir George Wright in 1600 (during Elizabeth I's reign) to house eight poor aged women. Known originally as the "Lower almshouses", they were built in Petersham Road, a few hundred yards south of what is now Bridge Street. By 1767, they were almost derelict. In 1767, William Turner rebuilt the almshouses on land at the top end of his estate in The Vineyard. Funds for the rebuilding were raised by public subscription. The almshouses were rebuilt again in 1857. They were damaged during the Second World War and replaced with four newly built houses in 1955.	

A seventh set of almshouses, Benn's Walk (now with five almshouses), was built in 1983. An eighth set of almshouses is 10–18 Manning Place (with nine almshouses), just off Queen's Road. The property was built in 1993 and was purchased by The Richmond Charities in 2017.

In 2025, a ninth set of almshouses, Elizabeth Twining Almshouses (with five almshouses) in Mitre Mews, was opened by Prince Richard, Duke of Gloucester and a further set of almshouses, the Elizabeth Doughty Almshouses (with 12 flats), opened at 5 Grove Road (on the corner of Queen's Road).

== Local newspapers ==
The Richmond and Twickenham Times, a weekly printed paper, has been published since 1873. The Twickenham & Richmond Tribune, a weekly online newspaper, has been published since 2016.

== Notable residents ==
For centuries, Richmond was home to the country's royal family. It also has a long list of famous residents, both past and present.

- List of current and former residents of Richmond upon Thames

== Film locations ==
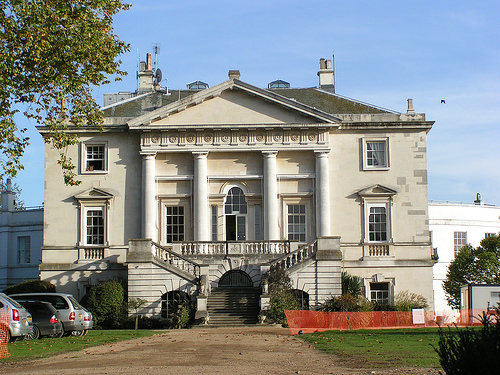
White Lodge in Richmond Park, home of the Royal Ballet School

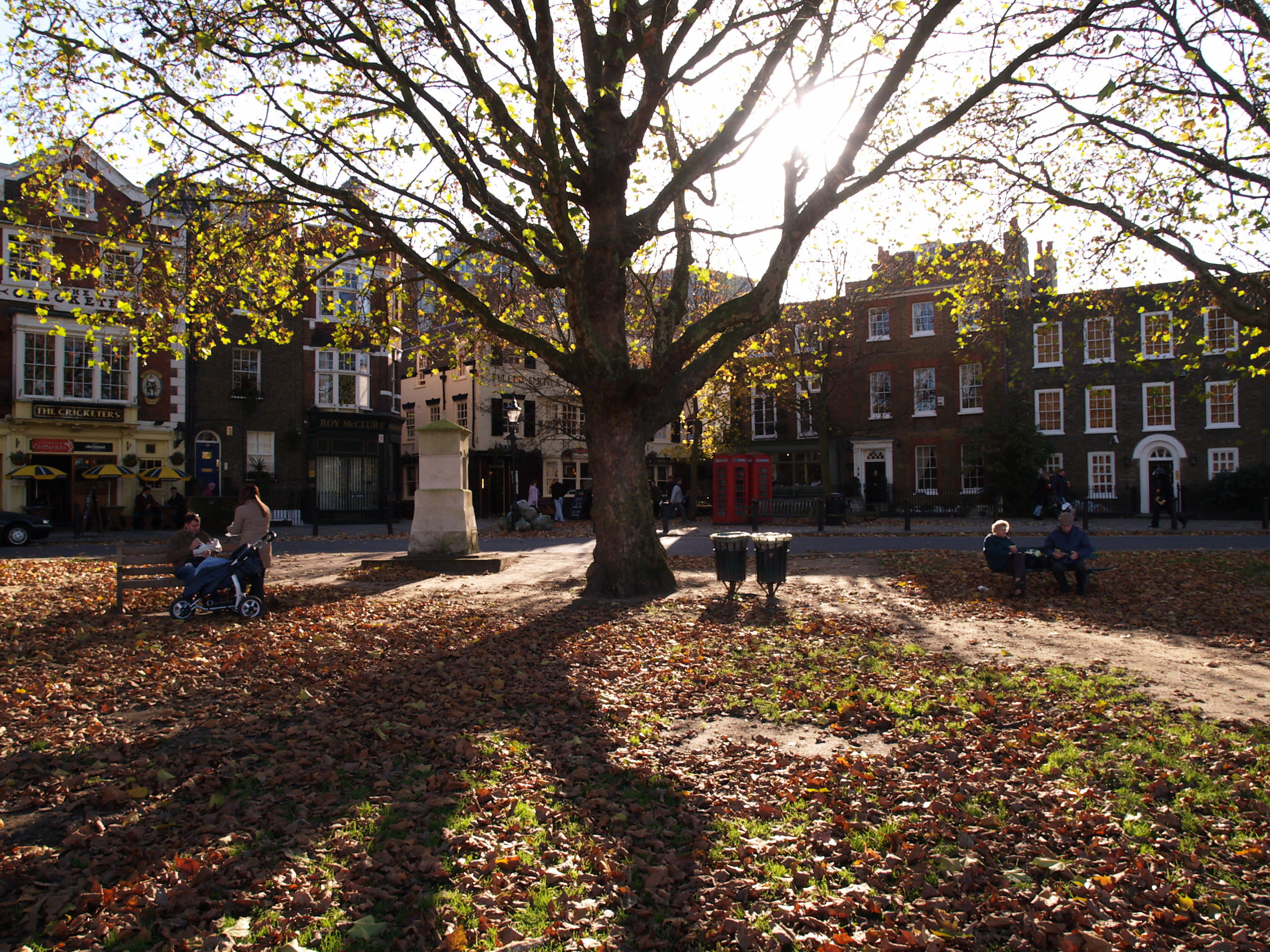
The south corner of Richmond Green

Richmond is a popular filming location. The village green, divided into The Green and Little Green, has Georgian splendour, stately listed buildings and paved alleyways leading to the high street. It is a magnet for film crews, particularly when recreating a city square or row of townhouses of bygone years. In 2011, The Crimson Petal and the White was filmed there, as was Downton Abbey in July 2014. Many other films and TV shows have featured The Green or Little Green, including Agatha Christie's Poirot, Simon Schama's Power of Art and Peter Rabbit 2.

The Apple TV+ sports comedy-drama TV series Ted Lasso is set in Richmond. Several filming sequences take place on The Green, Ted Lasso and other characters in the series are shown drinking at The Prince's Head pub (rebranded as The Crown and Anchor) and Ted lives in number 9½ Paved Court (actually No. 11A).

Richmond Theatre ranks as a major film location; it has featured in The Naked Truth (1957), Bugsy Malone (1976), The Krays (1990), Evita (1996), Bedazzled (2000), The Hours (2002), Finding Neverland (2004) and The Wolfman (2010).

Some scenes in the first episode of the second series of BBC's The Night Manager (2026) were filmed at Richmond Bridge and on Richmond riverside.

=== Richmond Park ===
Richmond Park has featured in many films and TV series.

- A locomotive runs through the park and crashes into a tree in the film The Titfield Thunderbolt (1955).
- As Chas Devlin in the 1968 film Performance, James Fox crosses Richmond Park in a Rolls-Royce car.
- The park was the backdrop for the classic historical film Anne of the Thousand Days (1969), with Richard Burton and Geneviève Bujold, which looks back to Richmond Park in the 16th century. The film tells the story of King Henry VIII's courtship of Anne Boleyn and their brief marriage.
- An Indian dust storm was filmed in the park for the film Heat and Dust (1983).
- The Royal Ballet School in Richmond Park featured in the film Billy Elliot (2000).
- In 2010, director Guy Ritchie filmed parts of Sherlock Holmes: A Game of Shadows (2011) in the park with Robert Downey Jr. and Jude Law.
- Some of the scenes from Into the Woods (2014), the Disney fantasy film featuring Meryl Streep, were filmed in the park.

As well as a location for films, Richmond Park is regularly featured in television programmes, corporate videos and fashion shoots. It has made an appearance on Blue Peter, Inside Out (the BBC regional current affairs programme) and BBC Springwatch. In 2014 it was featured in a video commissioned by The Hearsum Collection and in 2017 in a television film featuring and narrated by David Attenborough, which was produced by the Friends of Richmond Park.

== See also ==
- List of people in Richmond town and Richmond Park
- London Borough of Richmond upon Thames
- Museum of Richmond
- Old Deer Park
- Old Deer Park cricket ground
- Richmond Bridge, London
- Richmond Green
- Richmond Hill, London
- Richmond Palace
- Richmond Park
- Richmond Riverside
- Royal Star and Garter Home, Richmond
