= North Richmond =

North Richmond may refer to:

== Places in Australia ==
- North Richmond, New South Wales
- North Richmond, Victoria
  - North Richmond railway station

== Places in UK ==
- North Richmond (ward)

== Places in USA ==
- North Richmond, California
