= White Cross, Richmond =

Coordinates: 51°27′32″N 0°18′30″W

The White Cross
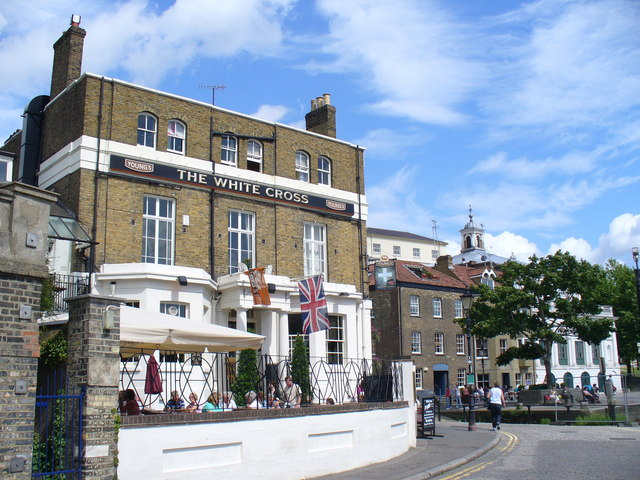

- Location within London Borough of Richmond upon Thames

General information
- Type: Public house
- Location: Riverside, Richmond, London, England

Listed Building – Grade II
- Official name: White Cross Hotel
- Designated: 25 May 1983
- Reference no.: 1250279

The White Cross is a Grade II listed public house at Riverside, Richmond, in the London Borough of Richmond upon Thames. It was built in the early mid-19th century, and the architect is not known.
