= Richmond Quaker Meeting House =

Quaker meeting house in Richmond, London, England

Religion
- Affiliation: Religious Society of Friends
- Ecclesiastical or organizational status: Meeting house
- Status: Active

Location
- Location: Richmond Quaker Meeting House, 1 Retreat Road (off Friars Lane), Richmond TW9 1NN London, United Kingdom
- Interactive map of Richmond Quaker Meeting House
- Coordinates: 51°27′35.22″N 0°18′29.21″W

Website
- Richmond-upon-Thames Quaker Meeting

Richmond Quaker Meeting House is a building in Retreat Road, just off Friars Lane in the centre of Richmond, London. Quakers in Richmond-upon-Thames meet for worship there for an hour each Sunday morning. The building dates from the 19th century and has been used as a Quaker meeting house since 1971.
