= Christian Fellowship in Richmond =

Church in Richmond, London, England

Christian Fellowship in Richmond, a member of the Evangelical Alliance, is a church that meets at Halford House, a Grade II listed building in Halford Road, in the centre of Richmond, south-west London. In 1951 a group of young people gathered to pray in Richmond, which led to the founding of the church. The house was subsequently purchased by the Fellowship in 1954.

== Activities ==
The Fellowship's main meeting, which includes worship, communion and Bible study classes for adults and children, is at Halford House on Sundays at 10.30am. Other meetings and activities take place throughout the week. Meetings are also held informally in private homes.

== Nepal Leprosy Trust ==
The Christian Fellowship in Richmond has had links with Nepal since the 1950s, when British nurse Eileen Lodge founded the Nepal Leprosy Trust, now based in Richmond in office space provided by the Christian Fellowship in Richmond. The Trust provides services to leprosy patients in Nepal. Many of the staff of this organisation are present and former Christian Fellowship parishioners. Nepal Leprosy Trust is a member of the Make Poverty History campaign.

== See also ==
- Halford House
