= Eileen Lecky Clinic =

Clinic in Putney, England, United Kingdom

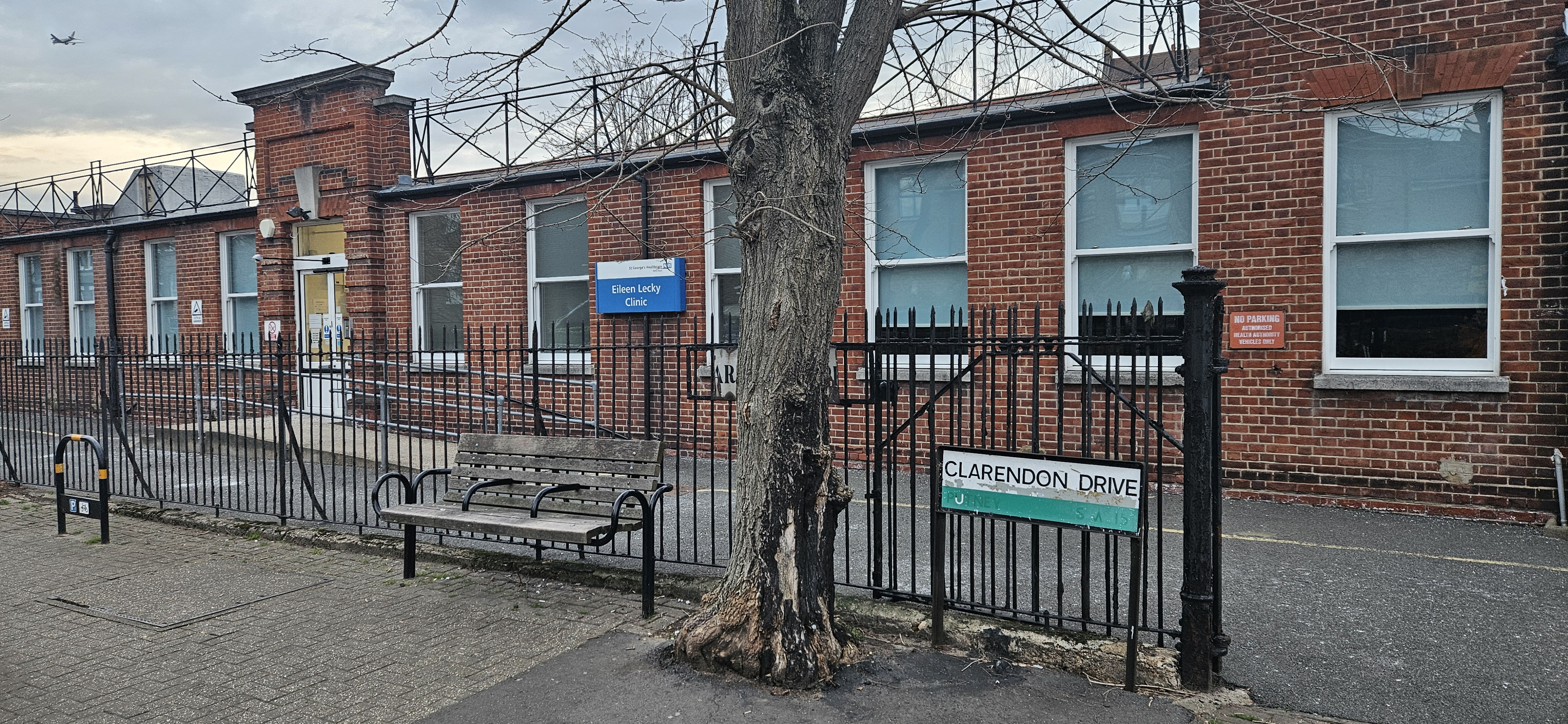
Eileen Lecky Clinic on Clarendon Drive, London

The Eileen Lecky Clinic is a medical centre in Putney in the London Borough of Wandsworth. It is run by St George's University Hospitals NHS Foundation Trust.

== Location ==
The clinic is located at 2 Clarendon Drive, on the north side of the road, at the corner with Charlwood Road.

== History ==
The clinic was originally founded in Putney as a branch of the Mothers' Welcome in 1916, by 1922 it was located on Felsham road and became the Putney Infant Welfare Centre. It moved to Clarendon Drive in 1931 as the Children's Health Centre, on a site where there had been two detached houses.

During World War II the building was seconded for gas decontamination and first aid, and infant welfare services were moved to classrooms at nearby St Mary's School, but the centre reopened at the end of the war.

Eileen Lecky was a secretary of the clinic and ran it for 50 years, she initially focussed on child health, but also started one of the first migraine clinics in the UK.

The clinic was renamed after Eileen Lecky in 1958 on her retirement, and there is a plaque in the building commemorating her service. Eileen lived in Putney on Deodar Road, and was awarded an MBE for helping the poor.

== Facilities ==
As of 2025 the clinic provides Midwifery Services, ADHD Community Paediatrics, Speech & Language, Multidisciplinary Feeding Team, and Paediatric Urology.

== Transport ==
The clinic is served by Transport for London buses on the Upper Richmond road and Upper Richmond road, Putney railway station (Southwestern Railway) is a 7-minute walk from the clinic.

== See also ==
- Healthcare in London
