= Kew Pier =

Pier on the River Thames, London

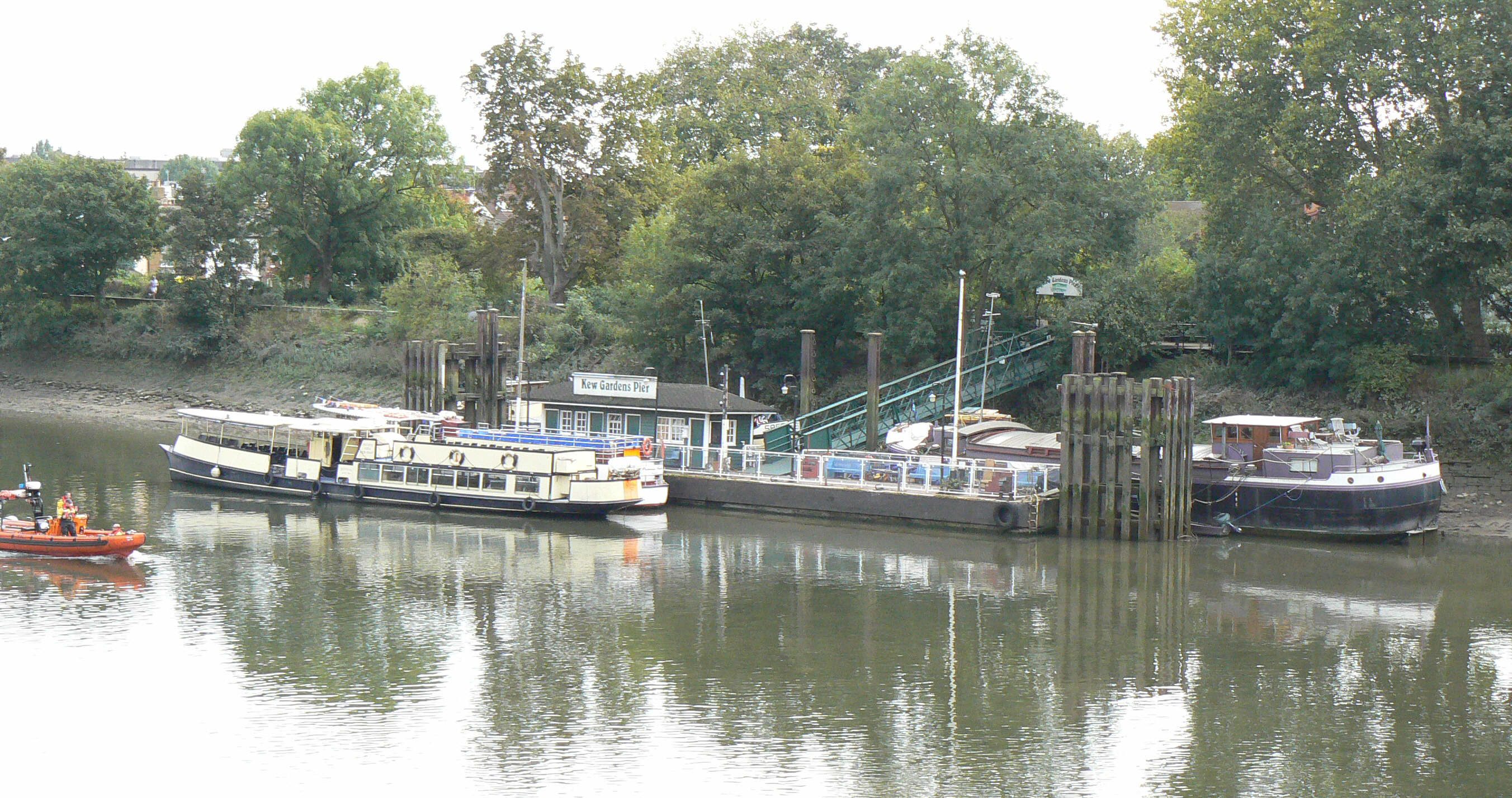
- Kew Pier
- Type: Tourist/Leisure services
- Location: River Thames, London, UK
- Coordinates: 51.4866°N 0.2865°W
- Owner: Westminster Passenger Services Association (Thames River Boats)
- Operator: Westminster Passenger Services Association

History
- Location within London Borough of Richmond upon Thames

Kew Pier or Kew Gardens Pier is a pier on the River Thames, in London, United Kingdom. It stands close to Kew Gardens and Kew Bridge in the London Borough of Richmond upon Thames and is serviced by passenger boats operated by Westminster Passenger Services Association (regularly advertised as Thames River Boats).

== Services ==
Thames River Boats operates services between Kew Pier and Westminster Pier with longer cruises also available which continue upriver to Richmond landing stage and Hampton Court landing stage.

It takes approximately 90 minutes to travel between Westminster and Kew, between two hours and two hours 20 minutes from Westminster to Richmond, and between three hours 30 minutes and four hours to travel between Westminster and Hampton Court. As with many river services, travel times are affected by the state of tide. Cruises between Kew and Richmond navigate through the half-tidal Richmond Lock and Weir and cruises between Richmond and Hampton Court navigate through Teddington Lock.
