= Halford House =

Grade II listed building in Richmond, London

- Interactive map of the Halford House area

General information
- Location: Halford House, 27 Halford Road, Richmond TW10 6AW (London Borough of Richmond upon Thames)
- Coordinates: 51°27′33.8″N 0°18′7.5″W
- Construction started: 1710

Website
- www.halfordhouse.org.uk

Listed Building – Grade II
- Official name: Halford House Richmond School of Music
- Designated: 25 June 1983
- Reference no.: 1080825

Halford House is a Grade II listed building in Halford Road, in the centre of Richmond in the London Borough of Richmond upon Thames. Originally an 18th-century manor house with 19th-century additions, it was purchased by the Christian Fellowship in Richmond in 1954. It previously housed the Richmond School of Music.

The earliest parts of Halford House date from 1710. The rest was built in 1745, with additions in 1867 at the back of the house.
