= Westminster Passenger Services Association =

Provider of scheduled Thames river boats

- London River Services
- Locale: London, UK
- Waterway: River Thames
- Transit type: Tourist / Leisure services
- Terminals: Westminster Pier, Kew Pier, Richmond landing stage, Hampton Court landing atage
- No. of lines: 3
- No. of vessels: 5
- No. of terminals: 4
- Website: www.thamesriverboats.co.uk

Westminster Passenger Services Association (regularly advertised as Thames River Boats) is a provider of regularly scheduled boat services on the River Thames in London. It is licensed by London River Services to run daily services from Westminster Pier to Kew Pier, with longer cruises also available which continue upriver to Richmond landing stage and Hampton Court landing stage. The cruises from Westminster Pier to Hampton Court are the longest regularly scheduled river services in London. Thames River Boats also operate 45-minute circular cruises from Richmond which usually take place on-board M.V. Princess Freda, a Dunkirk Little Ship which assisted with Operation Dynamo.

It takes approximately 90 minutes to travel between Westminster and Kew, between two hours and two hours 20 minutes from Westminster to Richmond, and between three hours 30 minutes and four hours to travel between Westminster and Hampton Court. As with many river services, travel times are affected by the state of tide. Cruises between Kew and Richmond navigate through the half-tidal Richmond Lock and cruises between Richmond and Hampton Court navigate through Teddington Lock.

In 2021, the following boats are available for the service: M.V. Clifton Castle, M.V. Connaught, M.V. Queen Elizabeth and M.V. Princess Freda (all owned and operated by Colliers Launches), and M.V Cockney Sparrow (owned and operated by Maynard Launches).
