= St George's University Hospitals NHS Foundation Trust =

NHS trust

- Type: NHS foundation trust
- Established: 5 March 1993
- Headquarters: Blackshaw Road; London; SW17 0QT
- Hospitals: St George's Hospital; Queen Mary's Hospital
- Staff: 9,756 (2019)
- Website: www.stgeorges.nhs.uk

St George's University Hospitals NHS Foundation Trust, formerly called St George's Healthcare NHS Trust, is based in Tooting in the London Borough of Wandsworth, and serves a population of 1.3 million across southwest London. A large number of services, such as cardiothoracic medicine and surgery, neurosciences and renal transplantation, also cover significant populations from Surrey and Sussex, totalling about 3.5 million people.

As of 2018, the trust employs 9,309 staff.

On 1 October 2010 St George's Healthcare integrated with Community Services Wandsworth, formerly the provider arm of NHS Wandsworth. This integration saw Community Services Wandsworth become the Community Services Wandsworth division of St George's Healthcare NHS Trust, with the 1,200 members of staff becoming employees of St George's Healthcare under TUPE.

St George's Healthcare incorporates St George's Hospital in Tooting and a full range of community services provided at Queen Mary's Hospital, Roehampton, St John's Therapy Centre in Battersea, HMP Wandsworth, health centres and clinics, GP surgeries, schools and in people's homes throughout Wandsworth.

== St George's Hospital ==
St George's Hospital is one of the UK's largest teaching hospitals. It shares its main hospital site in Tooting, England with the renowned St George's, University of London which trains NHS staff and carries out advanced medical research.

The hospital has around 1,000 beds and provides accident and emergency services, maternity services and care for older people and children. However, as a major acute hospital, St George's Hospital also offers specialist care for complex injuries and illnesses, including trauma, neurology, cardiac care, renal transplantation, cancer care and stroke. It is also home to one of four major trauma centres and one of eight hyper-acute stroke units for London.

St George's Hospital also provides care for patients from a larger catchment area in the South East of England, for specialties such as complex pelvic trauma. Other services treat patients from all over the country, such as family HIV care and bone marrow transplantation for non-cancer diseases. The trust also provides a nationwide state-of-the-art endoscopy training centre.

== St John's Therapy Centre ==
Opened in February 2007 on the same site as its predecessor building, St John's Therapy Centre in Battersea brings together community-based therapy services, a mental health unit and two GP practices, bringing a range of multi-disciplinary professionals closer together. In December 2008, all St George's Healthcare services formerly provided at the Bolingbroke Hospital in Battersea, were relocated to St John's.

St John's Therapy Centre was officially opened on Thursday 2 July 2009 by Professor Ann Keen MP, Parliamentary Undersecretary of State for Health.

A modern flexible building, the new centre is much larger than its predecessor and allows patients to access a variety of services under one roof. The success of the building's architectural design was praised when it was awarded a Wandsworth Design Award in 2007. The awards, which are presented by Wandsworth Borough Council, recognise buildings that have made a positive contribution to the local environment.

== Queen Mary's Hospital, Roehampton ==
Queen Mary's Hospital is a large community hospital housed in a state of the art, four-storey building containing all the modern equipment needed to offer the local population and its patients from around the world the latest treatment techniques.

The rebuilt hospital was opened in the grounds of the original hospital in February 2006. Services continued to be delivered in the old hospital whilst the new building was developed. The development of Queen Mary's Hospital, Roehampton was funded as a PFI scheme.

Queen Mary's Hospital provides outpatient rapid diagnostic and treatment facilities, mental health community services, a minor injuries unit, burns dressing clinic, limb fitting services, a sexual health clinic, 69 mental healthcare beds, 50 elderly and intermediate care beds and 20 rehabilitation beds.

Queen Mary's sees over 130,000 patients a year. In 2009 the hospital's Minor Injuries Unit saw 16,500 people come through its doors to be treated by an emergency nurse practitioner. The unit is open every day of the year offering treatment and advice on a wide range of injuries and illnesses.

== Community services ==
The Community Services Wandsworth division provides a wide variety of specialist and community hospital based services as well as providing community services to children, adults and older people. This includes district nursing, health visiting, specialist nursing, school nursing, family planning, sexual health, HIV services, haemoglobinopathies, community dentistry, occupational therapy, physiotherapy, speech and language therapy, dietetics, rehabilitation services and services for people with learning disabilities. These services are provided from Queen Mary's Hospital in Roehampton, Dawes House intermediate care unit, Tooting Walk-in centre, St John's Therapy Centre, Balham Health Centre, Bridge Lane Health Centre, Brocklebank Health Centre, Doddington Health Centre, Eileen Lecky Health Centre, Joan Bicknell Centre, Mapleton Centre, St Christopher's Health Clinic, Stormont Health Centre, Tooting Health Clinic, Tudor Lodge Health Centre, Westmoor Health Clinic, GP surgeries, schools, in people's homes and at Wandsworth Prison.

In October 2017 the trust lost the contract for community services in Wandsworth, worth £51.6 million to Central London Community Healthcare NHS Trust

=== HMP Wandsworth ===
HMP Wandsworth is the largest prison in the UK, with up to 1,665 inmates at any time. St George's Healthcare is responsible for providing a full range of health services at the prison.

In September 2009 Community Services Wandsworth took over the running of health services at HMP Wandsworth after Secure Healthcare, who previously provided health services there, went into voluntary liquidation and ceased to trade. Community Services Wandsworth integrated with St George's Healthcare NHS Trust on 1 October 2010.

== Large Trust of the Year ==
St George's Healthcare was named 2009 Large Trust of the Year by the independent Dr Foster Intelligence, publisher of the Hospital Guide. Researchers studied data supplied by hospitals across the UK, and awarded St George's one of the top scores and the top Band 5 rating across 13 safety indicators, leading to a fantastic score of 97.26 out of 100. St George's was joint third out of all trusts taking part, and top of the large trusts.

The trust did very well in the 2014 cancer patient experience survey and has agreed to pair up with Shrewsbury and Telford Hospital NHS Trust, which did badly, in a scheme intended to "spread and accelerate innovative practice via peer to peer support and learning".

== Financial summary ==
In 2009/10 St George's Healthcare achieved a surplus on income and expenditure of £10.6m meeting its financial duty to break-even during the year. This is the third successive year the trust has made a surplus after incurring deficits between 2003 and 2007. With regard to its other financial duties, the trust stayed within its external financing limit (EFL) – using slightly less cash to fund its services and to meet its obligations than the allowance set by the Department of Health. The trust also met its capital cost absorption duty earning a return of at least 3.5 per cent on its assets (land, buildings, equipment etc.) for the year and stayed within the Capital Resource Limit (CRL) approved by the Department of Health.

In 2007 the trust received loans from the Department of Health totalling £34m to finance the deficits it had accumulated in the four-year period 2003/04 – 2006/07.The loans are repayable in full by March 2012. Since the trust has stabilised its financial position it has been able to repay £18m of these loans over the last three financial years – £2m in 2007/08, £8m in 2008/09 and a further £8m last year. Under the terms of the loan agreement the trust was scheduled to make two further repayments of £8m each year in the next two years.

The trust's bid to become a Foundation Trust was hampered by its financial problems. Its application was repeatedly deferred but finally succeeded in February 2015. It plans a cost improvement programme for the 2014/15 financial year of £45.2m and a further £45.8m for 2015/6 but expects to finish 2014/5 with a £10 million deficit.

In March 2015 it was announced that 3 mental health wards at Queen Mary's Hospital will close and beds will be reduced from 153 to between 108 and 126 beds by 2021. £160m from the sale of NHS land will be invested in the Tooting and Tolworth hospitals. The trust reported that vacancies had reached 1/6 of the nursing workforce in July 2015.

In April 2017 it submitted a request for £200 million to improve its buildings after the Care Quality Commission warned it about breaches in regulations related to safe and fit premises. It got £27 million in overall capital funding from the Department of Health in 2019, of which £3.5 million was to sort out the water supply after two cases of legionella.

== Overseas patients ==
The trust issued invoices to patients thought to be ineligible for NHS treatment totalling £3.6 million in 2018–9, but only collected £0.5 million.

== Performance ==
In March 2016 the trust was rated as having a poor reporting culture in the Learning from Mistakes League. In October 2016 it was placed in special measures after it was rated inadequate by the Care Quality Commission. The trust chairman Sir David Henshaw said: "There will be no quick fix to the problems we face."Many of these challenges are due to very poor board and senior management decisions in the past and a failure to tackle the big challenges head on. 25% of patients with suspected cancer did not see a cancer specialist within two weeks though 93% should do so within that time.

In 2019 it was forced to outsource 125 general surgeries to Spire Healthcare and Ashford and St Peter's Hospitals NHS Foundation Trust because there were 118 patients waiting more than a year for treatment and it could not meet the national waiting times target that 92% of patients should wait no more than 18 weeks.

It was in special measures from 2016 until December 2019.

== Health tourism ==
In the summer of 2015 immigration officers from the Border Force were stationed in the hospital to train staff to identify "potentially chargeable patients". In October 2016 the trust announced that it planned to require photo identity papers or proof of their right to remain in the UK such as asylum status or a visa for pregnant women. Those not able to provide satisfactory documents would be sent to the trust's overseas patient team "for specialist document screening, in liaison with the UKBA (border agency) and the Home Office." It was estimated that £4.6 million a year was spent on care for ineligible patients. A check on 1,660 maternity patients during five months in 2017 found that 18 were not eligible for free NHS treatment and they were billed a total of £45,000.

== See also ==
- Healthcare in London
- List of NHS trusts
