= North Richmond (ward) =

Electoral ward in London, England

- Electoral ward for the Richmond upon Thames London Borough Council
- Borough: Richmond upon Thames
- County: Greater London
- Population: 10,744 (2021)
- Major settlements: Richmond, London
- Area: 2.625 km²

Current electoral ward
- Created: 2002
- Seats: 3

North Richmond is an electoral ward in the London Borough of Richmond upon Thames. The ward was first used in the 1964 elections and elects three councillors to Richmond upon Thames London Borough Council.

== Geography ==
The ward is named after the town of Richmond, London.

== Councillors ==
Election	Councillors		
2022	Nancy Baldwin (Liberal Democrats)	Richard Pyne (Liberal Democrats)	Richard Warren (Liberal Democrats)

== Elections ==
=== 2022 ===
North Richmond
Party	Candidate	Votes	%	±%
Liberal Democrats	Nancy Baldwin*	2,262	64.9	
Liberal Democrats	Richard Pyne*	2,147	61.6	
Liberal Democrats	Richard Warren*	2,141	61.4	
Conservative	Suzy Webb	798	22.9	
Conservative	Thomas Longley	761	21.8	
Conservative	Daniel Rosenschein	744	21.3	
Labour	Fiona O'Farrell	488	14.0	
Labour	Thomas Absolon	425	12.2	
Labour	Sam Cullen	393	11.3	
Turnout		3,485	46.3	
Liberal Democrats hold		Swing		
Liberal Democrats hold		Swing		
Liberal Democrats hold		Swing		

== See also ==
- List of electoral wards in Greater London
