= WPSA (New York) =

Student radio station at Paul Smith's College (1973–2011)

- Paul Smiths, New York; United States
- Frequency: 98.3 MHz

Ownership
- Owner: Paul Smith's College of Arts and Sciences

History
- First air date: January 12, 1973
- Last air date: 2011
- Former frequencies: 89.1 MHz (1973–1991)
- Call sign meaning: Paul Smiths Arts

Technical information
- Facility ID: 51928
- Class: D
- ERP: 10 watts
- HAAT: −77 meters (−253 ft)
- Transmitter coordinates: 44°26′6″N 74°15′5″W

WPSA was the student-run radio station at Paul Smith's College in Paul Smiths, New York, United States. The station operated from 1973 to 2011.

== History ==
On February 22, 1972, Paul Smiths applied for a construction permit to build a 10-watt non-commercial educational FM station on 89.1 MHz at the college, which was granted by the Federal Communications Commission on June 27. WPSA signed on for the first time on January 12, 1973; the station initially operated from the basement of Cooler Dorm, a campus dormitory that was a former meat market. By 1980, the station's operations had relocated to the student council room in Rec Hall. The early 1980s saw the station almost be shut down because of prior mismanagement, resulting in new managers and the radio club instituting a more professional station environment. In 1982, the radio station was described as "the most active club on campus", broadcasting 18 hours a day, seven days a week. For 1986, the station moved again to the Buxton Annex; it now only broadcast on weekdays for two hours in the morning and then from 2 p.m. to midnight, plus 14 hours a day on weekends.

The station was approved to move to 98.3 MHz in 1991. WPSA's license was cancelled and its call letters deleted in 1999 for failure to file a late renewal; the college filed a petition for reconsideration from the FCC, which was granted in 2001. The station was later assessed a $7,000 fine, reduced to $250 per its Class D station status, for the failure to file the renewal. WPSA ceased broadcasting at the end of the fall 2011 semester and surrendered the license to the FCC for cancellation that December. Reasons for the cessation of operations included a lack of interest from students and a potential FCC fine for failure to broadcast the minimum number of hours stipulated by its license.
