= Queen Mary's Hospital, Roehampton =

Hospital in Roehampton, England, United Kingdom

Queen Mary's Hospital
- St George's University Hospitals NHS Foundation Trust
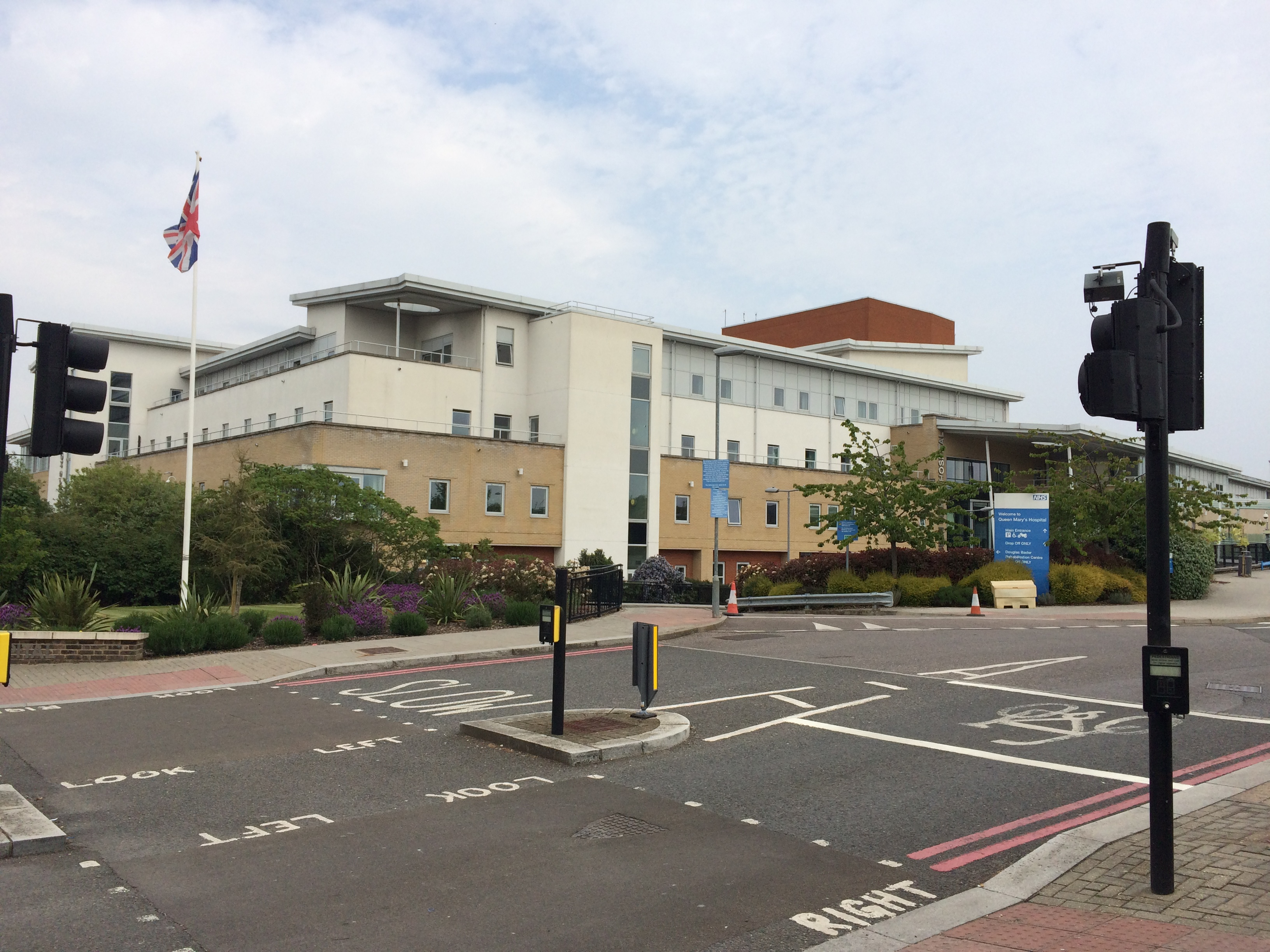
- Queen Mary's Hospital in 2020

- Location within Wandsworth

Geography
- Location: Roehampton Lane, Roehampton, London SW15 5PN, England, United Kingdom
- Coordinates: 51.4553°N 0.2422°W

Organisation
- Care system: National Health Service
- Type: Community hospital

Services
- Emergency department: No
- Beds: 88

History
- Founded: 1915; 111 years ago

Links
- Website: www.stgeorges.nhs.uk

Queen Mary's Hospital, formerly Queen Mary's Convalescent Auxiliary Hospitals, is a community hospital in Roehampton in the London Borough of Wandsworth. It is run by St George's University Hospitals NHS Foundation Trust.

== History ==
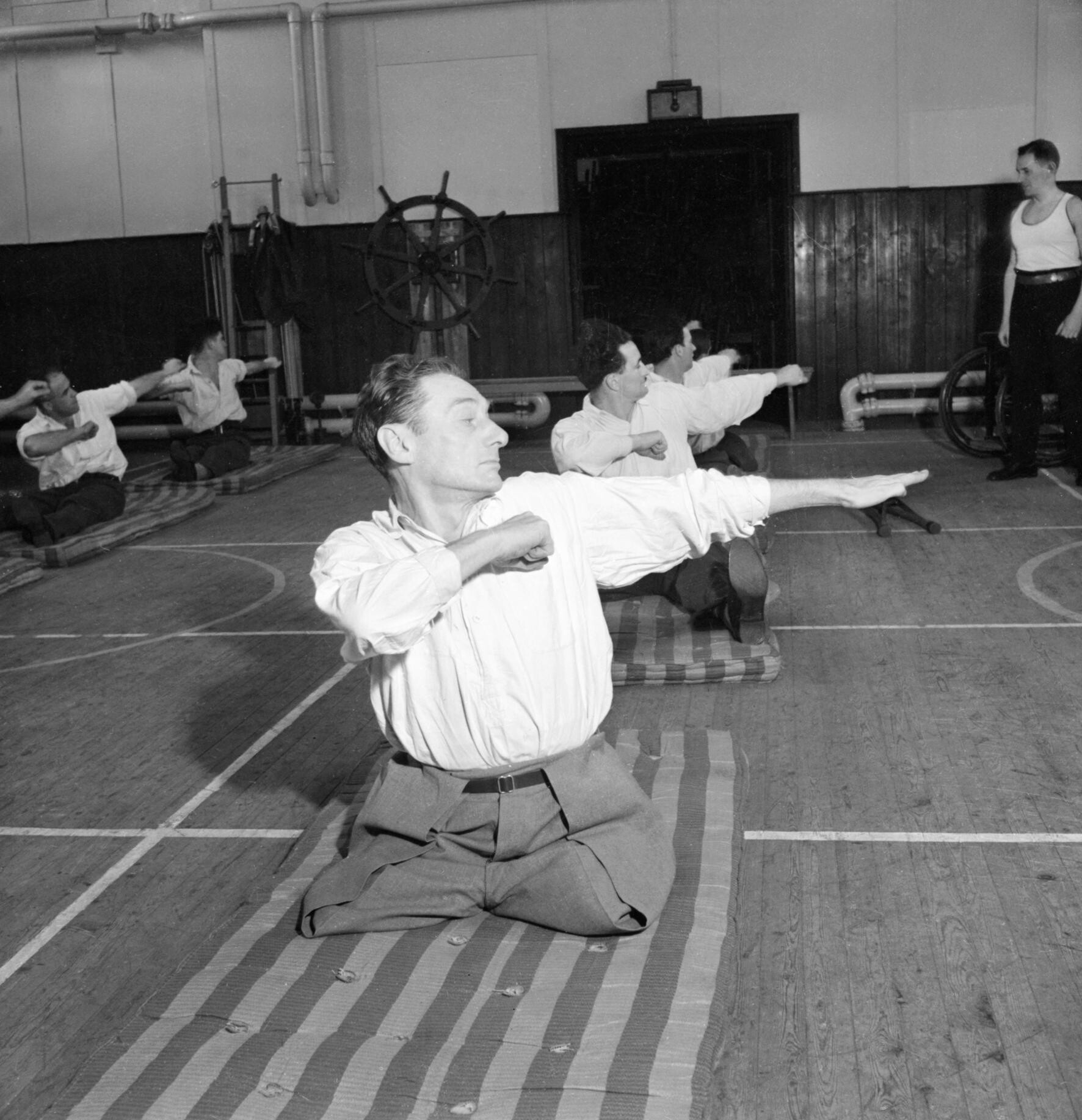
A physical rehabilitation session at Queen Mary's Hospital in 1944

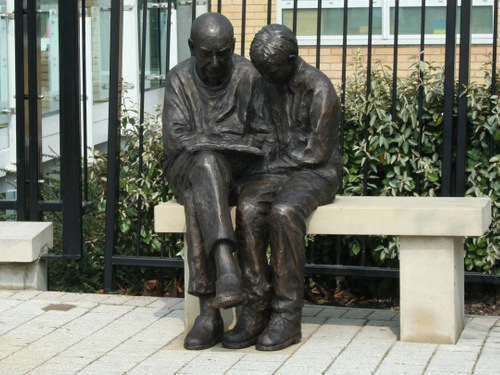
Bronze sculpture of Dickie and Sam by Brian Alabaster ARBS outside Queen Mary's Hospital Roehampton

The hospital was founded in 1915, primarily by Mary Eleanor Gwynne-Holford as a military hospital to provide care for wounded soldiers. It was initially based at Roehampton House specialising in the care of amputees and soon became a world-renowned limb fitting and amputee rehabilitation centre, with their artificial limbs created in the basement of the hospital. A fully equipped hospital was built on site in the early 1920s, a plastic and oral surgery unit developed by Sir Harold Gillies moved onto the site in 1925 and a Tropical Diseases unit was established for former prisoners of war in 1945.

The hospital joined the National Health Service late (in 1961). Following discovery of significant asbestos, the original site was left in 1983. The Douglas Bader Unit (named after double-amputee RAF pilot Sir Douglas Bader), an established international centre of excellence in the field of research and development of rehabilitation techniques, was opened on the site by Diana, Princess of Wales in 1993.

A major rebuilding programme was procured under the Private Finance Initiative in 2004. The new facilities, designed by P. M. Devereux and built by Bovis Lend Lease at a cost of £55 million, were officially opened by the Duke of Gloucester on 1 November 2006. The hospital has its own museum, opened in 2010 in the main hospital building.

At 00:17 on 16 February 2013 a fire started in Rose ward, a non public access unit. London Fire Brigade rescued its patients; in total 20 people were evacuated. The stop message (from firefighters that no further resources were required) was received at 02:18. London Ambulance Service treated patients affected.

== Facilities ==
The hospital has a total of 88 beds; 46 for people who have had limb amputations and require neurorehabilitation and 42 for care, treatment and rehabilitation of older people. It does not have an accident and emergency (A&E) department. The Minor Injuries Unit at Queen Mary's is temporarily closed.

The hospital also had three inpatient wards run by the South West London and St George's Mental Health NHS Trust.

== Transport ==
London Buses routes 265, 419, 493, 969 and N74 serve the hospital, stopping directly outside; and routes 85, 170 and 430 stop on a road behind the hospital.

Barnes station is the closest railway station and is 15–20 minutes walk away.

== Notable death ==
James Beck (1929–1973), Dad’s Army actor, best known for his role as Private Joe Walker, who died there aged 44 following complications from pancreatitis.

== See also ==
- Healthcare in London
- List of hospitals in England
