= Benn's Walk =

Coordinates: 51.465°N 0.300°W

- Interactive map of the Benn's Walk area

General information
- Location: Richmond TW9 2SY (London Borough of Richmond upon Thames), England, UK
- Completed: 1983
- Governing body: The Richmond Charities

Benn's Walk in Richmond, London, consists of five (originally six) almshouses, built in 1983 and now managed by The Richmond Charities. They were built on the site of Benn's Cottages, which had been developed on land endowed by William Smithet in 1727 to the charity that was then administering Michel's Almshouses.

== See also ==
- List of almshouses in the United Kingdom
