= Church Estate Almshouses =

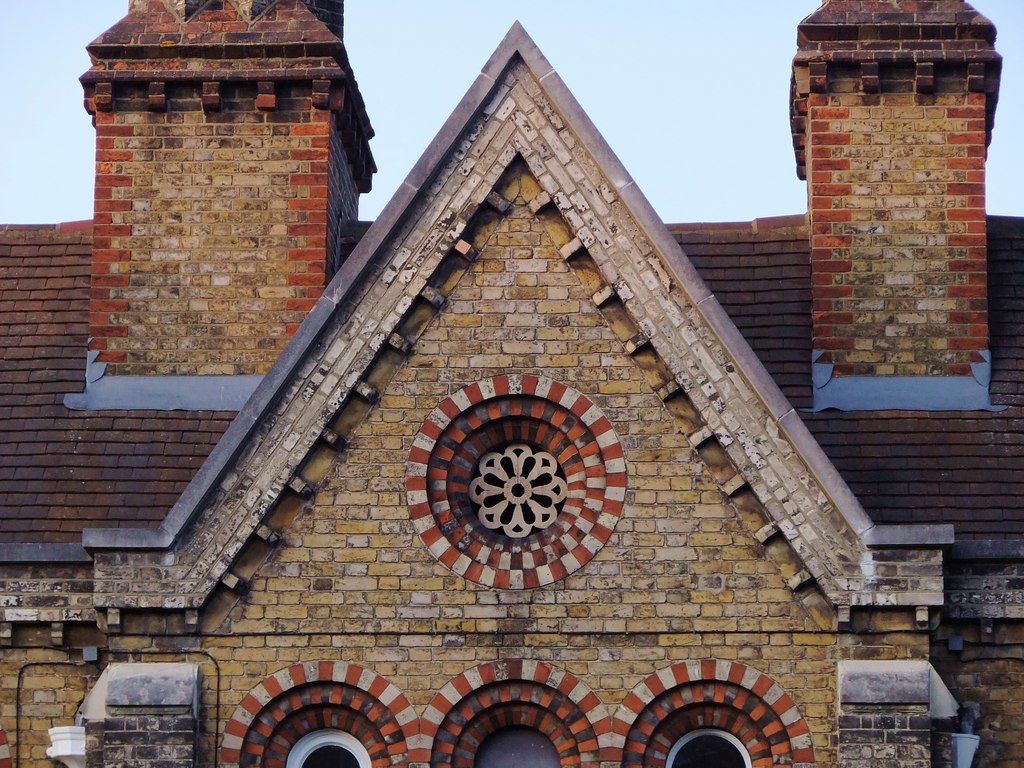
- Architectural detail

- Location within London Borough of Richmond upon Thames
- 51°27′44″N 0°17′29″W
- Location: Sheen Road, Richmond, London, TW9 1UX, England

History
- Built: 1843

Site notes
- Architect: William Crawford Stow

Listed Building – Grade II
- Official name: Richmond Church, Estate Almshouses
- Designated: 25 May 1983
- Reference no.: 1252805

Church Estate Almshouses are Grade II listed almshouses in Richmond, London, located on Sheen Road, near Hickey's Almshouses. Most of the buildings, which were designed by William Crawford Stow, date from 1843 but the charity that built them is known to have existed in Queen Mary I's time and may have much earlier origins. A further eight almshouses, in addition to the original ten, were built in 1968.

The almshouses are now managed by The Richmond Charities. New residents are accepted from 65 years of age.

== See also ==
- List of almshouses in the United Kingdom
