= Michel's Almshouses =

Coordinates: 51°27′26.78″N 0°18′8.84″W

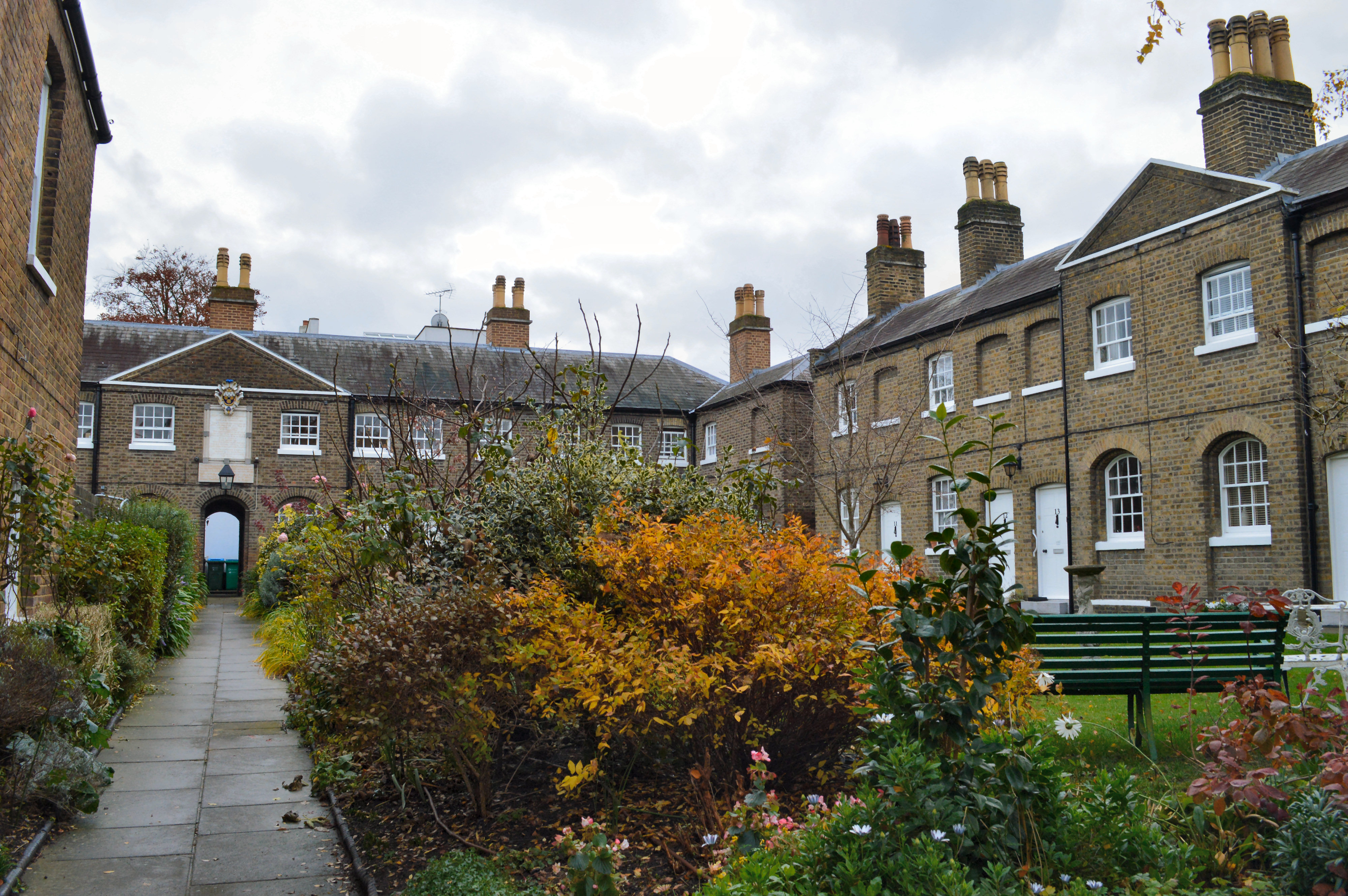
- Interactive map of Michel's Almshouses
- Location: The Vineyard, Richmond, London, England

History
- Built: 1696 (10 almshouses; rebuilt 1811); 1858 (6 further almshouses)
- Built for: Humphrey Michel

Listed Building – Grade II
- Official name: Michel's Almshouses, and Front Wall, Railings and Entrance Gates
- Designated: 24 December 1968
- Reference no.: 1261952

Michel's Almshouses are Grade II listed almshouses in Richmond, London, located in The Vineyard, opposite Bishop Duppa's Almshouses and Queen Elizabeth's Almshouses. They were founded in the 1690s by Humphrey Michel. The original ten almshouses were built in 1696 and were rebuilt in 1811. Another six almshouses were added in 1858.

The almshouses are now managed by The Richmond Charities. New residents are accepted from 65 years of age.

== See also ==
- List of almshouses in the United Kingdom
