= Hugh Brady (bishop) =

Church of Ireland bishop of Meath

Hugh Brady, a native of Dunboyne, was Bishop of Meath from 21 October 1563 until his death on 13 February 1585.

== Biography ==
His parentage is uncertain, as are most of the details of his early life. He was said to have graduated from the University of Oxford and to have been a professor of divinity there, but this cannot be confirmed.

In 1562, Hugh Brady was instituted to the rectory of Algakirk in the Holland division of Lincolnshire, in the diocese of Lincoln. His patron was John Manne, esq. Brady kept the living until he was promoted to the Bishopric of Meath; he was replaced by John Thompson on 5 March 1563. He refers to this post in a letter of 16 May 1565 to William Cecil, 1st Baron Burghley, where he uses the alternative name of his parish: Alderchurch. This has led historians to think Alderchurch must be St Mary Aldermary in London, but the church in Lincolnshire is meant.

(Bishop Brady must be distinguished from the Hugo Brady, B.A., who was ordained deacon by Edmund Grindal, Bishop of London, on 30 November 1560. His age was then 36, which gives a date of birth in 1524. Grindal ordained him priest on 23 February 1561. His place of birth was given as the Holland division of Lincolnshire. But the future bishop was by his own witness born in Dunboyne in County Meath. This other Brady was instituted rector of All Hallows Honey Lane in London on 21 February 1561. His patron was the Grocers’ Company. He was replaced by William Clarke on 6 February 1566.)

He was appointed Bishop of Meath in 1563 when he was in England. He returned to Ireland, was consecrated bishop and made a member of the Privy Council of Ireland. He was always diligent in attendance at Council meetings. He was vigorous in beating off raids on his diocese by Shane O'Neill, the effective ruler of Ulster. He enjoyed the friendship of Sir Henry Sidney, the Lord Deputy of Ireland, who praised his sound judgment, hospitality and blameless private life. His good qualities led Sidney and Adam Loftus, Archbishop of Armagh, to propose Brady as Archbishop of Dublin, after they had lobbied successfully for the recall of Archbishop Hugh Curwen (who became Bishop of Oxford). Shortly after however Brady and Loftus quarrelled, and Loftus blocked Brady's nomination in order to obtain the See of Dublin for himself.

He married twice, but little is known of his first wife. He married secondly Alice, daughter of Robert Weston, Lord Chancellor of Ireland and his first wife Alice Jenyngs. They had at least four children, including Luke, their eldest son, and Nicholas, grandfather of his namesake the poet. After Brady's death, his widow remarried Sir Geoffrey Fenton and had further issue, including Catherine, Countess of Cork. The poet Nicholas Brady was the bishop's great-grandson. Maziere Brady, Lord Chancellor of Ireland, was a nineteenth-century descendant of the bishop.
