= Adam Loftus (bishop) =

British bishop (c. 1533 – 1605)

The Most Reverend Adam Loftus
- Archbishop of Dublin; Bishop of Glendalough; Primate of Ireland
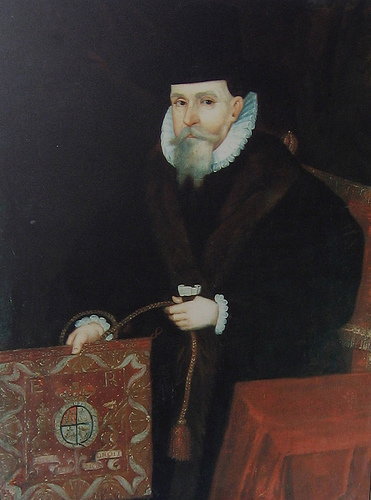
- Church: Church of Ireland
- Province: Dublin
- Diocese: Dublin and Glendalough
- Installed: 9 August 1567
- Term ended: 5 April 1605
- Predecessor: Hugh Curwen
- Successor: Thomas Jones
- Other post: Archbishop of Armagh (2 March 1563 – 9 August 1567)

Orders
- Consecration: 1563 by Hugh Curwen

Personal details
- Born: 1533 Yorkshire Dales, England
- Died: 5 April 1605 (age 71/72) Dublin, Ireland
- Denomination: Anglican
- Parents: Edward Loftus
- Spouse: Jane Purdon (m. c. 1560)
- Children: 10, including Dudley and Edward
- Education: Trinity College, Cambridge

Adam Loftus

1st Provost of Trinity College Dublin
- In office 1 August 1592 – 30 July 1594
- Preceded by: New office
- Succeeded by: Walter Travers

Adam Loftus (c. 1533 – 5 April 1605) was an English Roman Catholic priest from North Yorkshire who conformed to Anglicanism following the ascension to the throne of Queen Elizabeth I. Loftus subsequently served as Church of Ireland Archbishop of Armagh, Archbishop of Dublin, and Lord Chancellor of Ireland from 1581. Loftus is particularly important to Irish history as the first Provost of Trinity College Dublin and for his central role in the 1584 torture and execution of Archbishop Dermot O'Hurley, who was Beatified by Pope John Paul II as one of the Irish Catholic Martyrs in 1992. Loftus is also notable, through the marriage of his daughter Anne to the son and heir of Sir Henry Colley and their subsequent issue, as the ancestor of Arthur Wellesley, 1st Duke of Wellington.

== Early life ==
Adam Loftus was born in 1533, the second son of Edward Loftus, bailiff of Swineside (also described as Swineshead) in Coverdale, one of the Yorkshire Dales, for Coverham Abbey. Edward died when Loftus was only eight years old, leaving his estates to his elder brother Robert Loftus. Edward Loftus had made his living through the Catholic Church, but the son embraced the Protestant faith early in his development. He was an undergraduate at Trinity College, Cambridge, where he reportedly attracted the notice of the young Queen Elizabeth I, as much by his physique as through the power of his intellect, having shone before her in oratory. This encounter may never have happened, but Loftus certainly met with the Queen more than once, and she became his patron for the rest of her reign. At Cambridge, Loftus took holy orders as a Catholic priest and was appointed rector of Outwell St Clement in Norfolk. He came to the attention of the Catholic Queen Mary (1553–58), who named him vicar of Gedney, Lincolnshire. On Elizabeth's accession in 1558, he declared himself Anglican.

== Ireland ==
Loftus made the acquaintance of the Queen's favourite Thomas Radclyffe, 3rd Earl of Sussex and served as his chaplain in Ireland in 1560. In 1561 he became chaplain to Alexander Craike, Bishop of Kildare, and Dean of St Patrick's in Dublin. Later that year he was appointed Rector of Painstown, County Meath, and earned a reputation as a learned and discreet advisor to the English authorities in Dublin. In 1563, he was consecrated archbishop of Armagh at the unprecedented age of 30 by Hugh Curwen, Archbishop of Dublin.

Following a clash with Shane O'Neill, Chief of the Name of Clan O'Neill, Lord of Tír Eoghain, and the real power in Ulster during these years, Loftus moved his residence to Dublin in 1564. To supplement the meager income of his troubled archbishopric he was temporarily appointed to the Deanery of St Patrick's by the queen in the following year, "in lieu of better times ahead". He was also appointed president of the new Commission for Ecclesiastical Causes. This led to a serious quarrel with the highly respected Bishop of Meath, Hugh Brady.

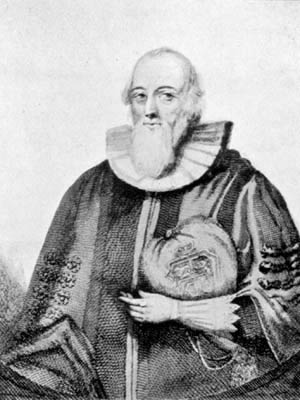
Adam Loftus

In 1567 Loftus, having lobbied successfully for the removal of Hugh Curwen, who became Bishop of Oxford, and having defeated the rival claims of the Bishop of Meath, was appointed Archbishop of Dublin, where the queen expected him to carry out reforms in the Church. On several occasions, he temporarily carried out the functions of Lord Keeper, and in August 1581 he was appointed Lord Chancellor of Ireland after an involved dispute with Nicholas White, Master of the Rolls in Ireland. Loftus was constantly occupied in attempts to improve his financial position by obtaining additional preferment (he had been obliged to resign the Deanery of St Patrick's in 1567) and was subject to repeated accusations of corruption in public office.

In 1582 Loftus acquired land and built a castle at Rathfarnham, which he inhabited from 1585 (and which has been recently restored to public view).

== Reformation ==
In 1569–1570 the divisions in Irish politics took on a religious tinge with the First Desmond Rebellion in Munster and Pope Pius V's 1570 papal bull Regnans in Excelsis. The bull sentenced Queen Elizabeth to excommunication and deposition for both heresy and the religious persecution of the Catholics under her rule. Thereafter, to a much greater extent than before, all Roman Catholics, even those who were completely apolitical, were regarded as traitors by the Queen and her officials.

Between 1583 and 1584, Archbishop Loftus took a leading part in the arrest, torture, and execution of Dermot O'Hurley, the Roman Catholic Archbishop of Cashel. Even though Archbishop O'Hurley revealed that he was not involved in anything except his religious mission and that he had refused to carry letters from the Cardinal Protector of Ireland to the leaders of the Second Desmond Rebellion, Sir Francis Walsingham suggested he should be tortured. Loftus replied to Walsingham: "Not finding that easy method of examination does any good, we made a command to Mr. Waterhouse and Mr. Secretary Fenton to put him to the torture, such as your honour advised us, which was to toast his feet against the fire with hot boots". Although the Irish judges repeatedly decided that there was no case against O'Hurley, on 19 June 1584 Loftus and Sir Henry Wallop wrote to Walsingham "We gave warrant to the knight-marshal to do execution upon him, which accordingly was performed, and thereby the realm rid of a most pestilent member".

Much has been written about Loftus during this time but between 1584 and 1591; he had a series of clashes with Sir John Perrot on the location of an Irish University. Perrot wanted to use St Patrick's Cathedral, Dublin as the site of the new University, which Loftus sought to preserve as the principal place of Protestant worship in Dublin (as well as a valuable source of income for himself). The Archbishop won the argument with the help of his patron, Queen Elizabeth I, and Trinity College Dublin was founded at its current location, named after his old college at Cambridge, leaving the Cathedral unaffected. Loftus was named as its first Provost in 1593.

The issue of religious and political rivalry continued during the two Desmond Rebellions (1569–83) and the Nine Years' War (1594–1603), both of which overlapped with the Anglo-Spanish War (1585–1604), during which some rebellious members of the Gaelic nobility of Ireland were covertly aided by the Papacy and by Elizabeth's arch-enemy King Philip II of Spain. Due to the unsettled state of the country, Protestantism made little progress in English-speaking or Gaelic Ireland, in direct contrast to the similarly Celtic-language-speaking people of Scotland, the Isle of Man, and Wales. Protestantism came to be associated with military conquest and was intensely hated by many. The political-religious overlap was personified by Adam Loftus, who served as Archbishop and as Lord Chancellor of Ireland. An unlikely alliance accordingly formed between Gaelic Irish families and the Hiberno-Norman "Old English", who had been mortal enemies for centuries but who now mostly remained Roman Catholic.

== Family ==
Around 1560 Adam was quietly married to Jane (c. 1540–1595), the daughter of James Purdon (1516-1595), and his wife Jane Little, daughter of Thomas Little of Thornhill, Cumberland, and Margaret Graham. The Purdons settled in Ireland and became substantial landowners in County Clare and County Cork, and were particularly associated with Ballyclogh, County Cork.

Adam and Jane Loftus were the parents of twenty children, eight of whom died in infancy. The twelve who grew to adulthood were:

1. Sir Dudley Loftus, married Anne Bagenal (grandparents of Dudley Loftus, a pioneer scholar of Middle Eastern languages);
2. Sir Edward Loftus (died 1601), Recorder of Dublin, killed at the Siege of Kinsale; married Anne Duke, no surviving issue;
3. Adam Loftus, unmarried, killed in battle;
4. Sir Thomas Loftus, married Ellen Hartpole;
5. Henry Loftus, Thomas' twin, died in his teens;
6. Isabella Loftus (also found as 'Isabel'), married (as his 1st wife) Sir William Ussher, son of John Ussher, Alderman of Dublin, and his wife Ales (or Alison), daughter of Sir William Newman, Knight, Mayor of Dublin;
7. Anne Loftus, married (i) Sir Henry Colley of Carbury; (ii) George Blount; and (iii) Edward Blayney, 1st Baron Blayney; she and Henry were ancestors of Arthur Wellesley, 1st Duke of Wellington;
8. Catherine Loftus, who married Sir Francis Berkeley and then Henry Berkeley;
9. Martha Loftus, who married Sir Thomas Colclough of Tintern Abbey, County Wexford;
10. Dorothy Loftus, married Sir John Moore of Croghan;
11. Alice Loftus, married Sir Henry Warren of Warrenstown; and
12. Margaret Loftus, married Sir George Colley of Edenderry

== Death ==
Loftus died in Dublin in 1605 and was interred in the building he had helped to preserve for future generations, while many of his portraits hang today within the walls of the University which he helped found. Having buried his wife Jane (Purdon) and two sons (of their 20 children) in the family vault at St. Patrick's, Adam Loftus died at his Episcopal Palace in Kevin Street "worn out with age" and joined his family in the same vault. Loftus' zeal and efficiency were commended by James I upon the king's accession.

== Personality ==
Elrington Ball describes him as the dominant judicial figure in Elizabethan Ireland, who through his exceptional strength of personality towered above all his contemporaries.

== Sources ==
- Francis Elrington Ball (1902): A History of the County of Dublin – Dublin: Greene's Bookshop; the HSP Library – Ir 94133 1: 6 volumes
- Francis Elrington Ball, (1926): The Judges of Ireland 1221–1921 – London: John Murray pp. 214–217; 326–328
- Lee, Sidney, ed. (1893). "Loftus, Adam (1533?–1605)" . Dictionary of National Biography. Vol. 34. London: Smith, Elder & Co. pp. 73–77.
- Luce JV, 1992: Trinity College Dublin, the first 400 years –
- Prestwick J, 1783: Origin and Etymology of the Loftus Family – attributed to a Herald's manuscript
- James Ware, 1739: The Whole Works of Sir James Ware concerning Ireland, revised & improved – Vol I p. 94–95, 1739

Church of Ireland titles
Preceded by George Dowdall	Archbishop of Armagh; 1562–1567	Succeeded by Thomas Lancaster
Preceded by Hugh Curwen	Archbishop of Dublin; 1567–1605	Succeeded by Thomas Jones
Political offices
Preceded by Robert Weston	Lord Chancellor of Ireland (as Lord Keeper); 1573–1576	Succeeded by Sir William Gerard
Preceded by Sir William Gerard	Lord Chancellor of Ireland; 1581–1605	Succeeded by In commission – next held by Archbishop Thomas Jones
Academic offices
Preceded by Inaugural office	Provost of Trinity College Dublin; 1592–1594	Succeeded by Walter Travers
