= Mary Rich, Countess of Warwick =

Irish maid of honour and diarist (1625–1678)

- Born: Mary Boyle; 8 November 1625; Youghal, County Cork, Ireland
- Died: 12 April 1678 (aged 52); Essex, England
- Occupations: Diarist, writer
- Notable work: Diaries (1666–1677); Occasional Meditations
- Spouse(s): Charles Rich, 4th Earl of Warwick (m. 1641–1673)
- Children: 2 (died young)
- Parent(s): Richard Boyle, 1st Earl of Cork; Catherine Fenton

Mary Rich, Countess of Warwick (8 November 1625 – 12 April 1678) was a diarist and the seventh daughter of Richard Boyle, 1st Earl of Cork, and his second wife, Catherine Fenton, only daughter of Sir Geoffrey Fenton, Principal Secretary of State for Ireland, and Alice Weston. She was born in 1625 in Youghal, County Cork, and after her mother's death in 1628, was raised by her relatives Sir Richard and Lady Clayton in Mallow, before becoming a maid of honour to Queen Henrietta Maria. In 1641 she married Charles Rich, 4th Earl of Warwick. They had two children, who died young. Rich is remembered for her love of literature and the diaries she kept from 1666 to 1677, which include many of the current events in 17th-century Ireland, alongside her domestic issues.

== Life ==
=== Childhood and adolescence ===
Mary was noted from childhood onwards for her exceptional stubbornness and independence. Her father, who was probably the most formidable figure in Irish politics at the time, called her "my unruly daughter" and was unable to control her. He arranged a marriage for her with Lord Clanbrassil but Mary, who was only 13, refused to marry Clanbrassil on grounds of an "incurable aversion" to him, and no threat or argument would change her mind. Her father cut off her allowance, leaving her without any money to buy new clothes, but to no avail. Two years later, having been banished from her father's house to another abode near Hampton Court, she made a secret love marriage with Charles Rich, 4th Earl of Warwick, who was then a penniless younger son with no financial prospects, who had frequently visited her when she was recovering from an attack of measles.

Her father, who was clearly fond of her despite their differences, relented sufficiently to provide quite a generous dowry. Though Mary may have been known as Richard Boyle's "unruly daughter", she expressed in her writings great respect and gratitude for him. In one of her diary entries, she noted that her heart was "gratefully affected for God's good and strange providence in raising my family, by my father, from a mean and low beginning, to be one of the greatest men of fortune in Ireland."

=== Adulthood ===
Although she relied on her independence, Mary was known as a good woman with Puritan values. Her life illustrates the journey of an Irishwoman who was committed to her life and virtues in the 17th century. Mary's experiences, which she usually recorded in her autobiography, letters and diary, generally upheld her code of ethics.

Charles unexpectedly inherited the earldom of Warwick in 1659. Thereafter Mary lived mainly at Leigh's Priory near Felstead, Essex, where she helped to raise her husband's three nieces. As the years passed she became increasingly devout, spending much of her day in prayer and meditation. Leigh's Priory became a resort for bishops and clergy. Her diaries record her religious fervour; they also reflect her increasingly bitter quarrels with her husband, whose character was ruined by twenty years of chronic pain from gout and by the tragic deaths of their son and daughter. They were reconciled before his death in 1673, and he left her his estate for life. Mary died five years later, and by her own wish, was buried "with no pomp". There were no surviving children.

== Publications ==
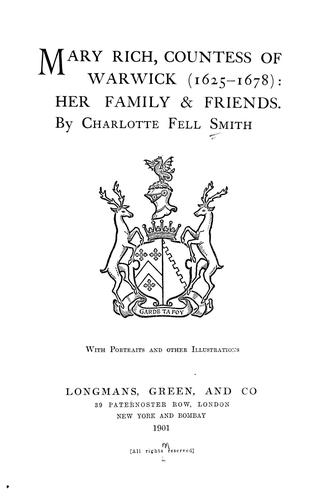
Much of Mary's biographical information

Mary Rich kept a diary for the last eleven years of her life, in which she recorded her day-to-day affairs and other occurrences throughout the period.

After her husband's death in 1673, Mary underwent extreme grief, as expressed in this diary entry:

This greatest trial of my life did for a long time disorder my frail house of clay, and made me have thoughts that my dissolution was near; which thoughts were not at all terrible or affrighting to me, but very pleasant and delightful.

Her diary's historical value is considerable, as she supplied precise dates for many events, both public and domestic, of the period immediately after the Restoration. When viewed as a human document only, it is equally interesting, as it affords an insight into the mind of a woman of a type foreign to that we are accustomed to connecting with the years of the later Stuarts.

In addition, Mary Rich wrote letters to various correspondents. According to Illustrious Irishwomen, these were often distinguished members of the literary world.

She also wrote Occasional Meditations. Described as rich in domestic detail, with vivid analogies and homely comparisons, these are an expression of a deeply religious woman, who achieved a distinctive sense of self as she strove to make her life one with God.

=== Extract ===
The following is a sample piece from Mary Rich's diary:

O, we do all offend!

There's not a day of wedded life, if we
Count at its close the little, bitter sum
Of thoughts and words and looks unkind and froward,
Silence that chides, and woundings of the eye,
But prostrate at each other's feet we should

Each night forgiveness ask.
