= Brian Duppa =

English bishop

The Right Reverend Brian Duppa
- Bishop of Winchester
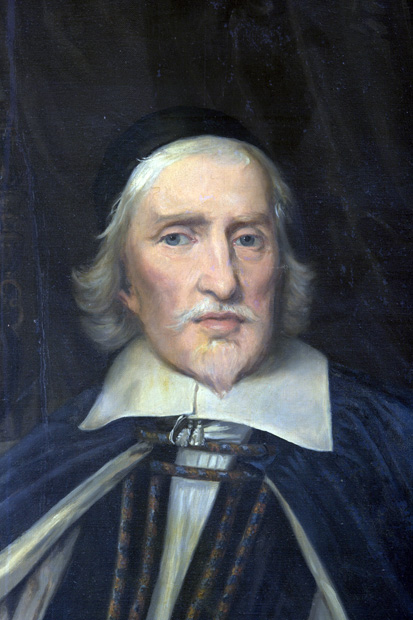
- A contemporary portrait of Bishop Duppa
- Church: Church of England
- Diocese: Diocese of Winchester
- In office: 4 October 1660 (translation) – 1662 (death)
- Predecessor: Vacancy (English Interregnum)
- Successor: George Morley
- Other posts: Lord Almoner (7 July 1660–1662) & Prelate of the Garter (1660–1662); Bishop of Salisbury (December 1641–1646 & 1660); Bishop of Chichester (13 June 1638 {confirmed}–1641); Vice-Chancellor of the University of Oxford (1632–1634); Dean of Christ Church (1628–1638)

Personal details
- Born: 10 March 1589 Lewisham, Kent, England
- Died: 26 March 1662 (aged 73) Richmond, Surrey, England
- Buried: 24 April 1662, Westminster Abbey
- Denomination: Anglican
- Parents: Jeffrey Duppa
- Spouse: 1. An aunt of William Salter; 2. Jane Killingtree, 23 November 1626 (married)–?
- Profession: tutor
- Education: Westminster School; Christ Church, Oxford

Ordination history of Brian Duppa
History
Priestly ordination
- Ordained by: John Bridges, Bishop of Oxford
Episcopal consecration
- Principal consecrator: William Laud, Archbishop of Canterbury
- Co-consecrators: Thomas Morton (Durham); Robert Wright (Cov. & Lich.); John Bancroft (Oxford); Matthew Wren (Ely)
Episcopal succession
Bishops consecrated by Brian Duppa as principal consecrator
- Sheldon, Henchman, Morley, Sanderson & Griffith: 28 October 1660

Brian Duppa (also spelled Bryan; 10 March 1589 – 26 March 1662) was an English bishop, chaplain to the royal family, Royalist and adviser to Charles I of England.

== Life ==
He was educated at Westminster School and Christ Church, Oxford, graduating BA in 1609. He was a Fellow of All Souls College, Oxford in 1612. According to the list of Vicars in St Mary's Church, Westham he was vicar at this Sussex parish from 1625 and Vice-Chancellor of the University of Oxford in 1632. He became chaplain to Edward Sackville, 4th Earl of Dorset, who as his patron helped him become Dean of Christ Church.

He was chaplain to Charles I from 1634, and tutor to his two sons. He was regarded as a follower of William Laud. He was involved in the approval by Charles I of the manuscript of Eikon Basilike, reading it to the King in Carisbrooke Castle.

Duppa was made Bishop of Chichester (1638). From two years later (marking the start of the Civil War) until death he lived much more quietly at Richmond, (as Bishop of Salisbury from 1641), one of the few Anglican bishops to remain alive throughout the English Interregnum to retake their Sees at the Restoration. He was deprived of the See of Salisbury by Parliament on 9 October 1646, and episcopacy was abolished for the duration of the Commonwealth and the Protectorate.

In 1660, on the return from exile of Charles II of England to restore the monarchy, Duppa was briefly restored to Salisbury, but swiftly made Bishop of Winchester and Lord Almoner. He legally took up the See of Winchester by the confirmation of his election on 4 October 1660.

He died two years later. His tomb monument in Westminster Abbey was created by Balthasar Burman, the son of Thomas Burman.

== Works ==
He was editor of Jonsonus Virbius (1638), a collection of memorial verses from various authors for Ben Jonson.

== Eponymous places ==
Two places bear his name given mostly to sports fields: Bishop Duppas Park in Lower Halliford, Shepperton, Surrey and seemingly Duppas Hill in Waddon, Croydon, London reflecting his influence on the ex-ecclesiastical land.

Two sets of almshouses were erected with his funds or endowed with his lands: one with original components; one with 19th-century replacement such housing:

- Duppa's Almshouses, Pembridge, Herefordshire
- Bishop Duppa's Almshouses, Richmond, London owned by Richmond Charities.

== In literature ==
Bishop Duppa appears in Robert Neill's historical novel Crown and Mitre, set in 1659. In the last days of the Commonwealth the Bishop, living at a modest house in Richmond, is shown having a clandestine meeting with the emissaries of the exiled King Charles II, to discuss plans for the Restoration.

== Notes ==
Academic offices
Preceded by Richard Corbet	Dean of Christ Church, Oxford; 1628–1638	Succeeded by Samuel Fell
Preceded by William Smyth	Vice-Chancellor of Oxford University; 1632–1634	Succeeded by Robert Pink
Church of England titles
Preceded by Richard Montagu	Bishop of Chichester; 1638–1641	Succeeded by Henry King
Preceded by John Davenant	Bishop of Salisbury; 1641–1646 & 1660	Succeeded by Humphrey Henchman
Vacant Commonwealth Title last held by Walter Curle	Bishop of Winchester; 1660–1662	Succeeded by George Morley
