= John Underhill (bishop) =

English academic and bishop

John Underhill (c.1545–1592) was an English academic, involved in controversy, and later Bishop of Oxford.

== Life ==
Underhill was born about 1545 at the Cross Inn, Cornmarket, Oxford. He entered Winchester College in 1556, and was elected a Fellow of New College, Oxford, on 27 October 1561, being admitted B.A. on 11 December 1564 and M.A. on 27 July 1563. He obtained the degrees of B.D. and D.D. on 7 July 1581. In 1570, he was appointed praelector of moral philosophy, and in 1575 filled the office of proctor.

In 1576, Underhill offered opposition to Robert Horne, Bishop of Winchester, in his visitation of the college. Horne, who used his power as Visitor very freely, removed him from his fellowship. Underhill, however, had recourse to the Chancellor of Oxford, then Robert Dudley, 1st Earl of Leicester. On Leicester's advice he threatened Horne with a lawsuit, and procured his reinstatement. In the following year, on 22 June, after further controversy, he was elected Rector of Lincoln College.

About 1581, he became chaplain in ordinary to the Queen, and on 7 September was instituted rector of Thornton-le-Moors, Cheshire. In 1583, he disputed with Giordano Bruno, who was visiting Oxford. Bruno's work La Cenere de le Ceneri (The Ash Wednesday Supper) may refer to Underhill in the character Nundinio. His meeting with Bruno is fictionalised in the novel Heresy by S. J. Parris.

About 1586, he was appointed one of the vicars of Bampton, Oxfordshire, and on 15 March 1587 was instituted Rector of Witney, also in Oxfordshire. On 8 December 1589, he was elected Bishop of Oxford on the recommendation of Francis Walsingham, succeeding Hugh Curwen after a long vacancy. He died in London on 12 May 1592, and was buried in Christ Church Cathedral. After his death the see remained vacant for eleven years.

He was a friend and patron of the poet Thomas Churchyard.

== Sources ==
- This article incorporates text from a publication now in the public domain: "Underhill, John (1545?-1592)". Dictionary of National Biography. London: Smith, Elder & Co. 1885–1900.

Academic offices
Preceded by John Tatham	Rector of Lincoln College, Oxford; 1577–1590	Succeeded by Richard Kilby
Preceded by Thomas Thornton	Vice-Chancellor of the University of Oxford; 1584–1585	Succeeded by Edmund Lilly
Church of England titles
Preceded by Hugh Curwen vacancy	Bishop of Oxford; 1589–1592	Succeeded by vacancy John Bridges
