= Houblon's Almshouses =

Coordinates: 51.4614°N 0.2970°W

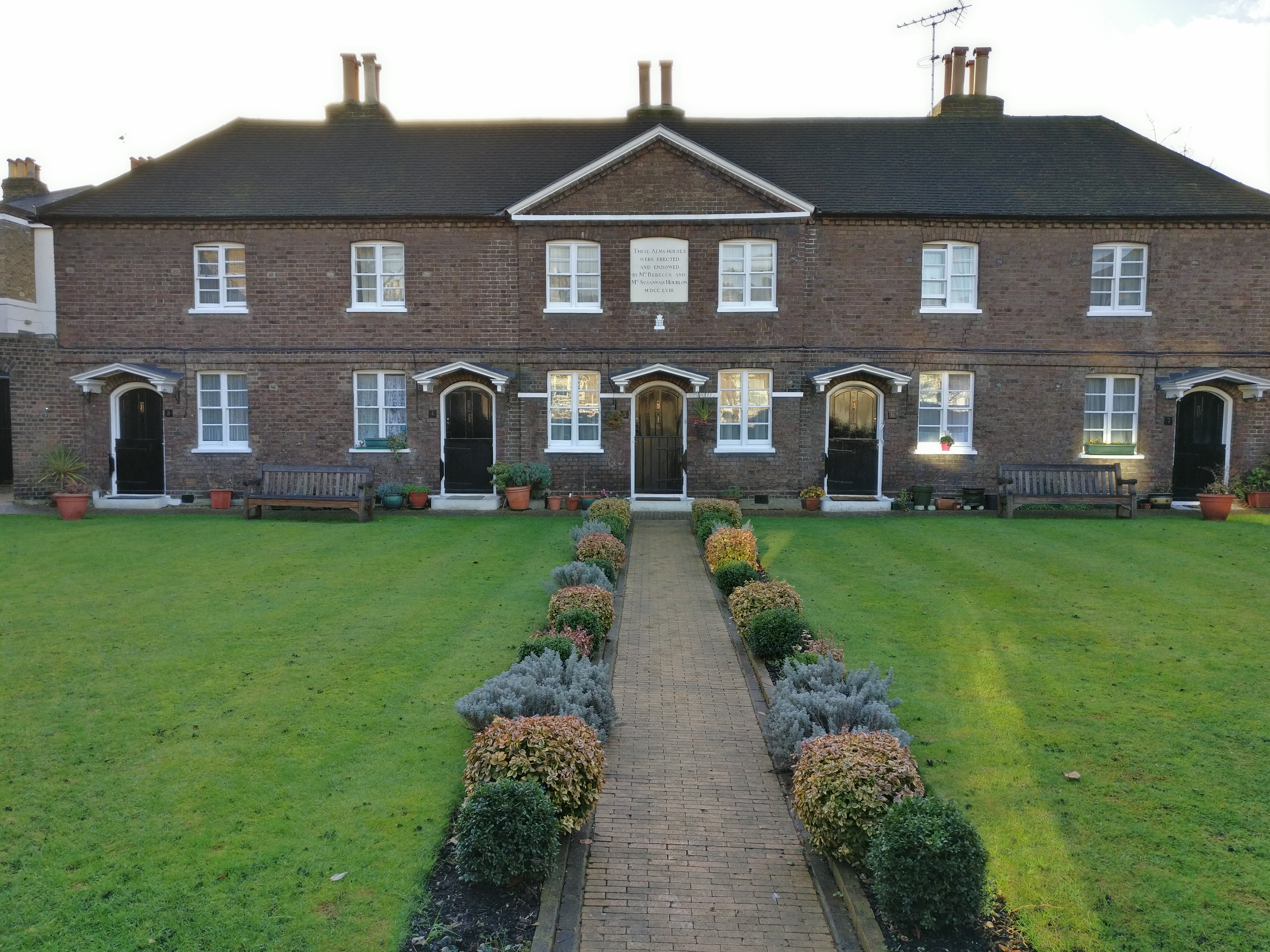
- Interactive map of Houblon's Almshouses
- Location: Worple Way, Richmond, London, England

History
- Built: 1757 (9 almshouses); 1857 (2 further almshouses)
- Built for: Rebecca and Susanna Houblon

Listed Building – Grade II*
- Official name: Houblon's Almshouses
- Designated: 10 January 1950
- Reference no.: 1253033

Houblon's Almshouses are Grade II* listed almshouses in Richmond, London. They were founded in the 18th century by two sisters, Rebecca and Susanna Houblon, whose father, Sir John Houblon, had been the first Governor of the Bank of England. The oldest almshouses were built in 1757, originally to house nine poor women who had been brought up in the Protestant religion. A further two almshouses were built in 1857.

The almshouses are now managed by The Richmond Charities. New residents are accepted from 65 years of age.

== See also ==
- List of almshouses in the United Kingdom
- Richmond Charities
