= Hugh Curwen =

English ecclesiastic and statesman

The Right Reverend Hugh Curwen
- Bishop of Oxford
- Church: Church of England
- Diocese: Oxford
- In office: 1567–1568
- Predecessor: Thomas Goldwell
- Successor: John Underhill
- Previous post: Archbishop of Dublin (1555–1567)

Orders
- Consecration: 8 September 1555 by Edmund Bonner

Personal details
- Born: c. 1500 Bampton, Westmorland, England
- Died: 1 November 1568 Swinbrook, England
- Buried: St John the Baptist, Burford, Oxfordshire, England
- Denomination: Catholic 1528–1534; 1555–1558; Anglican 1534–1555; 1558–1567
- Education: Brasenose College, Oxford

Ordination history of Hugh Curwen
History
Episcopal consecration
- Principal consecrator: Edmund Bonner
- Co-consecrators: Thomas Thirlby; Maurice Griffith
- Date: 8 September 1555
- Place: London

Hugh Curwen (c. 1500 – 1 November 1568) was an English ecclesiastic and statesman, who served as Archbishop of Dublin and Lord Chancellor of Ireland from 1555 to 1567, then as Bishop of Oxford until his death in November 1568.

Previous entries, including the 1911 Oxford Dictionary of National Biography, confused him with Richard Curwen, almoner to Henry VIII.

== Life ==
Born in Bampton, Westmorland, he is thought to have been educated at Brasenose College, Oxford. He had at least two brothers, Christopher and James, who was the grandfather of Richard Bancroft, Archbishop of Canterbury and 'overseer' of the King James Bible.

== Career ==
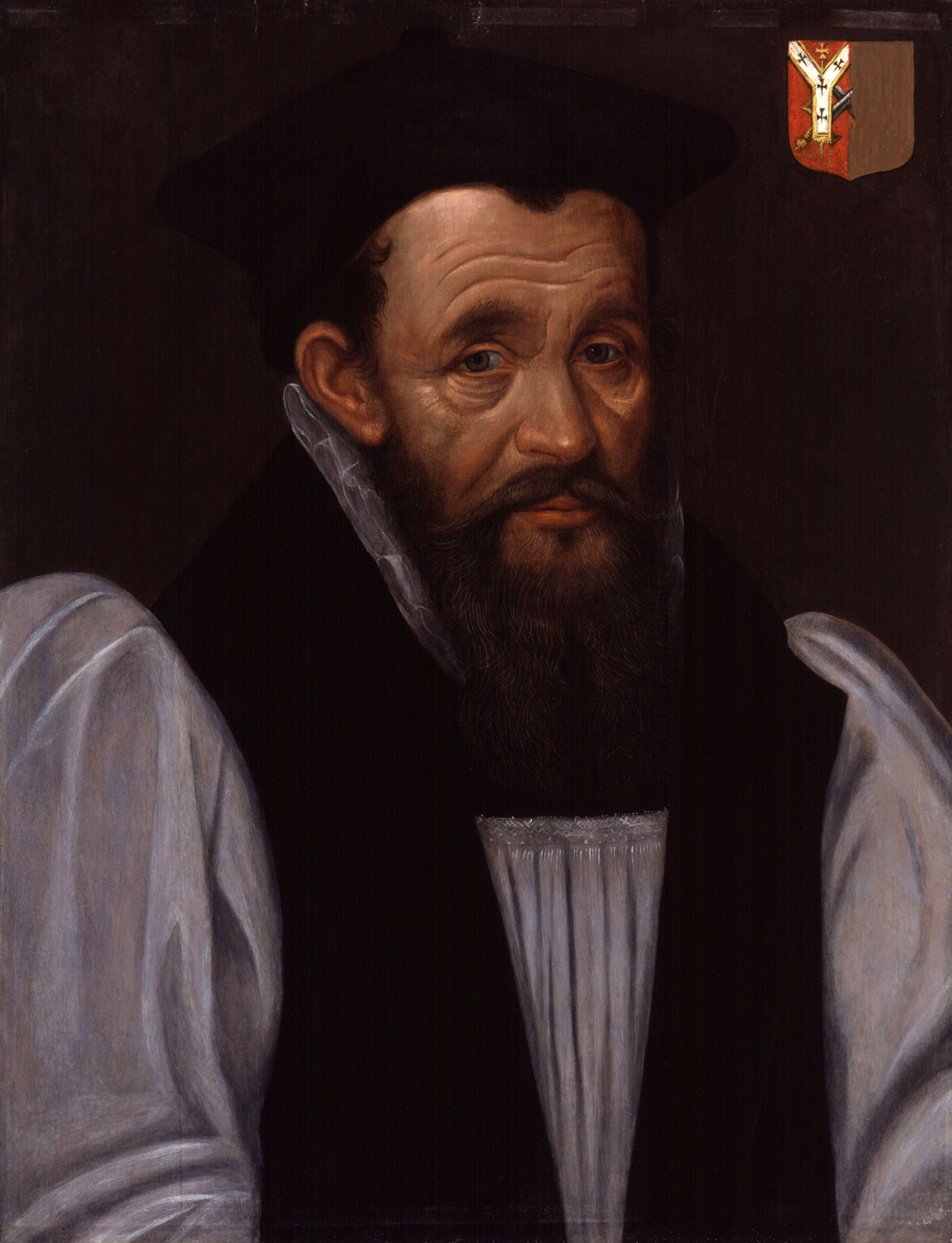
His grandnephew Richard Bancroft, Archbishop of Canterbury

In February 1528, Curwen gained a degree in Canon law, followed by a Master of Arts in 1532. In 1533, he was appointed Rector in the village of Ferriby, Lincolnshire. The following year, England broke with the Catholic Church and formed the Church of England, led by Henry VIII, rather than the Pope.

In 1541, he became dean of Hereford, followed by a series of administrative posts; when Mary became queen in 1555, he conformed with the restoration of Catholicism. Nominated Roman Catholic Archbishop of Dublin, he was consecrated on 8 September 1555 by Edmund Bonner. He was also appointed Lord Chancellor of Ireland, and in 1557 served as Lord Justice of Ireland during the absence of the Lord Deputy of Ireland, the Earl of Sussex.

When Elizabeth succeeded in 1558, only five Irish bishops accepted the Religious Settlement, Curwen being one of them. He remained Archbishop and Lord Chancellor until 1567, but was accused of 'moral delinquency' by Hugh Brady and Adam Loftus, apparently for his reluctance to implement key religious reforms.

Curwen suffered from palsy and poor health made it increasingly difficult to continue his duties; in 1564, he obtained a sinecure position for his nephew Richard Bancroft at St Patrick's Cathedral, Dublin. Apparently 'speechless and senseless', he was finally allowed to resign in June 1567, when he became Bishop of Oxford. He died at his home in Swinbrook in October 1568, and was buried at the Church of St John the Baptist, Burford. The diocese of Oxford remained vacant until 1589, when John Underhill became bishop.

== Arms ==
Coat of arms of Hugh Curwen

Escutcheon
Argent a millrind Sable between four Cornish choughs on a chief Gules a fleur-de-lys between two roses-en-soliel dimidiated per pale Or.

Motto
When Curwen was serving as a bishop his arms would be displayed impaled with the arms of the diocese and topped with a mitre.

== Sources ==
- Cranfield, Nicolas S (2008). Bancroft, Richard (Online ed.). Oxford DNB. doi:10.1093/ref:odnb/1272.
- Walshe, Helen Coburn (2008). Curwen [Coren], Hugh. Oxford DNB. doi:10.1093/ref:odnb/6966.
- Murray, James (2009). Enforcing the English Reformation in Ireland: Clerical Resistance and Political Conflict in the Diocese of Dublin, 1534 - 1590. Cambridge University Press. ISBN 978-0521770385.
- John D'Alton, Memoirs of the Archbishops of Dublin (Dublin, 1838).

Political offices
Preceded by Sir William FitzWilliam as Lord Keeper	Lord Chancellor and Lord Keeper of Ireland; 1555–1558 (as Lord Chancellor); 1558–1559 (as Lord Keeper); 1559–1567 (as Lord Chancellor)	Succeeded by Robert Weston as Lord Chancellor
Religious titles
Preceded by Gamaliel Clifton	Dean of Hereford; 1541–1555	Succeeded by Edmund Daniel
Preceded by George Browne	Archbishop of Dublin; 1555–1567	Succeeded by Adam Loftus
Preceded by Thomas Goldwell	Bishop of Oxford; 1567–1568	Succeeded by John Underhill appointed 1589
