= Robert Weston =

English politician and Lord Chancellor of Ireland

The Right Honourable Robert Weston PC
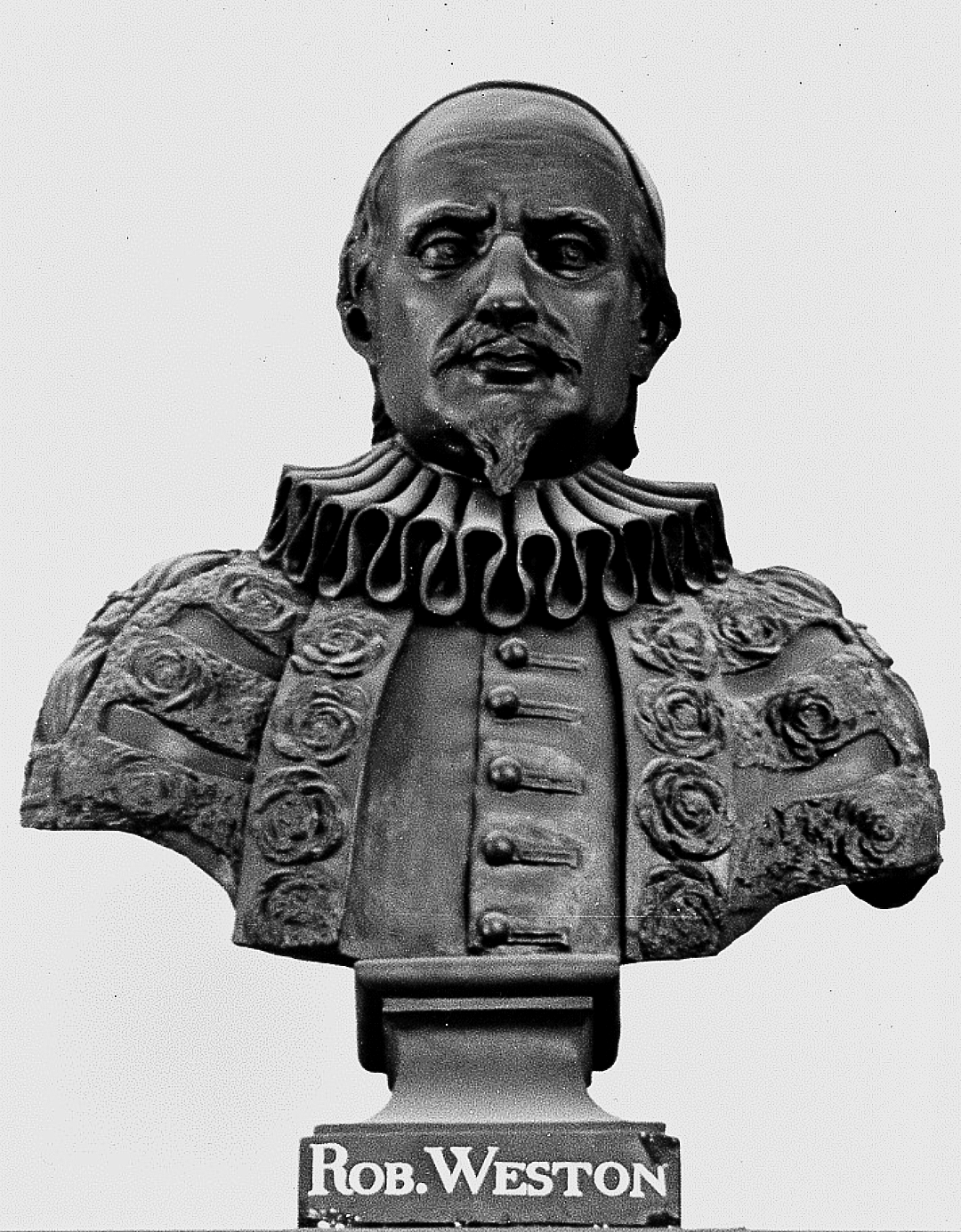
- Robert Weston, Bust by John Cheere

Lord Chancellor of Ireland
- In office 1567–1573
- Appointed by: Elizabeth I
- Preceded by: Hugh Curwen
- Succeeded by: Adam Loftus

Dean of the Arches
- In office 1560–1567
- Appointed by: Elizabeth I
- Preceded by: William Mowse
- Succeeded by: Thomas Yale

Personal details
- Born: c. 1522
- Died: 20 May 1573 (aged 50–51)
- Resting place: St Patrick's Cathedral, Dublin
- Spouse: Alice Jenyngs
- Children: John Weston; Alice Weston
- Parents: John Weston; Cecilia Neville
- Education: All Souls College, Oxford
- Profession: politician; lawyer

Robert Weston (c. 1522 – 20 May 1573) of Lichfield, Staffordshire, was an English civil lawyer, who was Dean of the Arches and Lord Chancellor of Ireland in the time of Queen Elizabeth.

== Life ==
Robert Weston was the 3rd son of John Weston (d. after 1525), of Weeford, Staffordshire, and Cecilia Neville, daughter of Ralph Neville, Lord Neville, and sister of Ralph Neville, 4th Earl of Westmorland. His nephew was Knight Simon Weston, son of his brother James Weston, MP for Lichfield.

The Weston family of Gloucestershire, who produced another senior Irish judge in William Weston, were probably cousins of Robert. He entered All Souls College, Oxford and was elected Fellow in 1536. He studied Civil Law and attained the degree of BCL on 17 February 1538 and DCL on 20 July 1556.

From 1546 to 1549, he was a principal of Broadgate Hall, and at the same time deputy reader in civil law at the university, under Dr John Story. He was not a clergyman, and his later appointment to two lucrative deaneries is said to have greatly troubled his conscience.

Weston was elected Member of Parliament for Exeter in March 1553 and for Lichfield in 1558 and 1559.

== Lord Chancellor of Ireland ==
On 12 January 1559, Weston was created Dean of the Arches and was a commissioner for administering the oaths required of ecclesiastics under the Act of Uniformity. He was consulted in regard to the Queen's Commission issued on 6 December 1559 for confirming Matthew Parker as Archbishop of Canterbury and was included in a commission issued on 8 November 1564 to inquire into complaints of piratical depredations committed at sea on the subjects of the King of Spain.

The Lord Deputy of Ireland, Sir Henry Sidney, requested that Weston be nominated for the post of Lord Chancellor of Ireland in succession to Hugh Curwen, Archbishop of Dublin, in April 1566. After a year, on 10 June 1567 Queen Elizabeth told Sidney that after good deliberation she had made the "choice for the supply of room of Chancellor by naming thereunnto our trusty well-beloved Doctor Weston, dean of the arches here, a man for his learning and approved integrity thoroughly qualified to receive and possess the same" and "that for some increase of his living whilst he remaineth in our service there she was pleased to give unto him the Deanery of St Patrick's, whereof the Bishop of Armagh (Adam Loftus) is now dean and yet to leave it at our order, as we know he will".

Weston arrived in Dublin early in August and was sworn into office on 8 August 1567. He was conscientious in performing his duties, and greatly respected for his integrity, although ill-health (he was plagued by gout and gallstones) hampered his effectiveness. He was appalled by the laziness and inefficiency of many of the Irish judges and urged Elizabeth to replace them with Englishmen wherever possible. He was equally shocked at the poverty and ignorance of many of the Protestant clergy in Ireland. His zeal for reform led him, though a layman, to become an effective leader of the Church of Ireland for a few years. He cooperated with Adam Loftus, now Archbishop of Dublin, in purging the Archdiocese of Dublin of crypto-Catholics, but was opposed to the persecution of the Roman Catholic majority, or any efforts to forcibly convert them.

Weston and Sir William Fitzwilliam the Vice-Treasurer of Ireland were sworn Lords Justices in Christ Church Cathedral, Dublin on 14 October, and he became a member of the Privy Council of Ireland. Weston addressed the Irish Parliament when it was summoned on 17 January 1568. In addition to being Dean of St Patrick's, he was Dean of Wells from 1570 to 1573, but his health was failing.

== Death ==
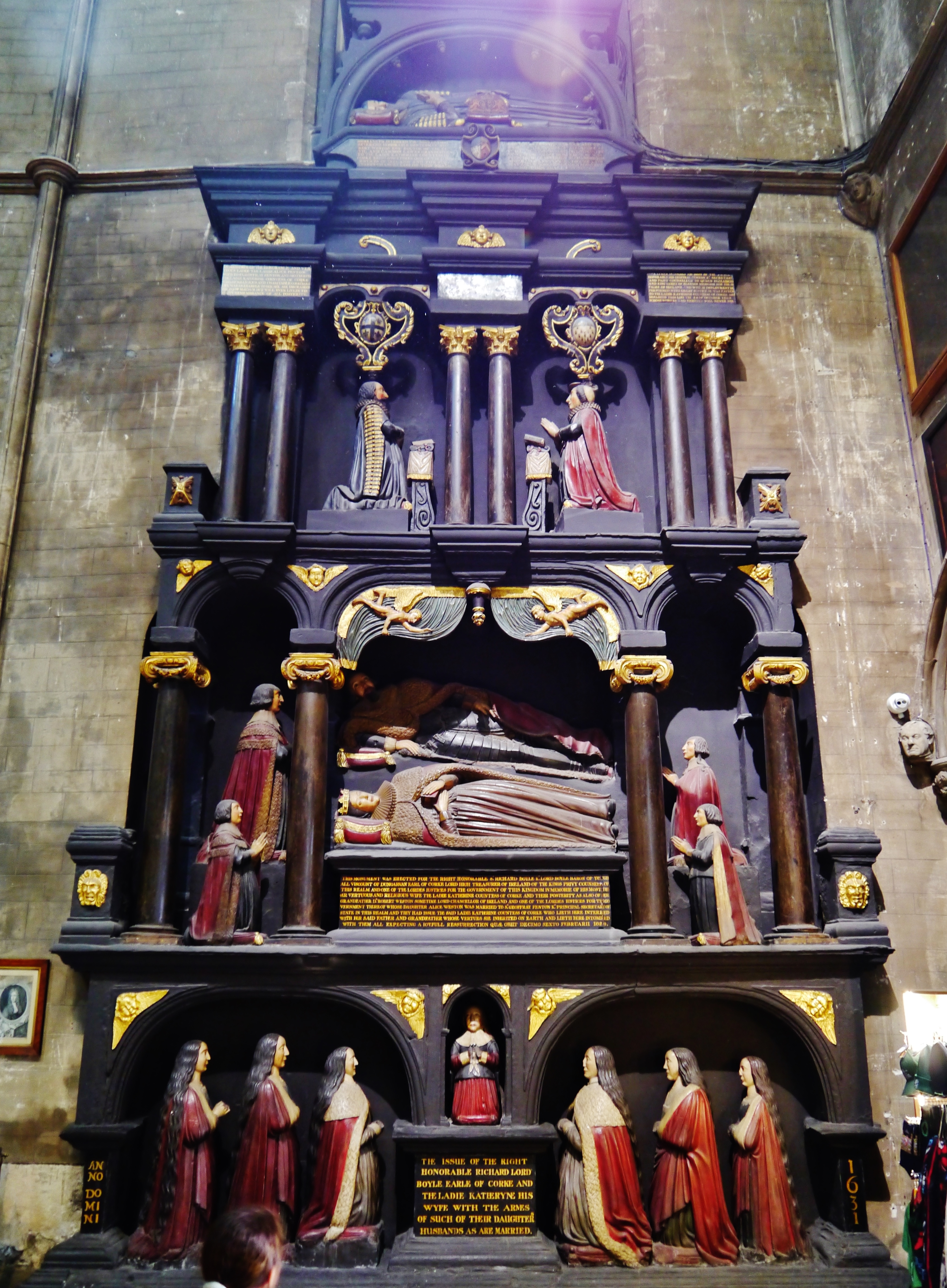
The Boyle Family Monument at the West End of St Patrick's Cathedral, Dublin, erected in 1632 by Richard Boyle, 1st Earl of Cork for himself, his wife, Catherine and family. In the top tier is the recumbent figure of his wife's grandfather, Robert Weston.

He died on 20 May 1573 and was buried beneath the altar in St Patrick's Cathedral, Dublin, "leaving behind him an excellent character for uprightness, judgment, learning, courtesy, and piety".

Weston was described as follows

"A man in his time most godlie, upright, and virtuous, and such a one as that place was not possessed of the like in many currents of years. In his life he was most virtuous and godlie; in matters of council most sound and perfect; in justice most upright and uncorrupted in hospitalitie very bountie and liberal; in manners and conversation most courteous and gentle; faithful to his Prince, firm to his friend, and courteous to all men; and as was his life, so was his death, who a little time before the same called his household, and gave them such godlie instructions as to their callings appertained; then he set his private things in order, and he spent all the time that he had in praiers and exhortations"

== Family ==
Weston married Alice Jenyngs (d. in or after 1573), daughter of Richard Jenyngs of Great Barr, Staffordshire. They had a son John, and three daughters, of whom we know most of Alice (d. after 1585), who married firstly Hugh Brady, Bishop of Meath, by whom she had numerous children including Luke and Nicholas, and secondly Sir Geoffrey Fenton, by whom she was the mother of Catherine, who married Richard Boyle, 1st Earl of Cork, and of Sir William Fenton.

Political offices
Preceded by Archbishop Hugh Curwen	Lord Chancellor of Ireland; 1567–1573	Succeeded by Archbishop Adam Loftus (as Lord Keeper)
