= William Weston (c. 1546–1594) =

Member of the Parliament of England

Sir William Weston (c. 1546–1594) was an English-born politician and judge who ended his career as Chief Justice of the Irish Common Pleas.

He was born in Gloucestershire, eldest son of Hugh Weston of Weston Park, Weston-sub-Edge. He is thought to have been a cousin of Robert Weston, Lord Chancellor of Ireland 1567–1573, although Robert was a Lichfield man.

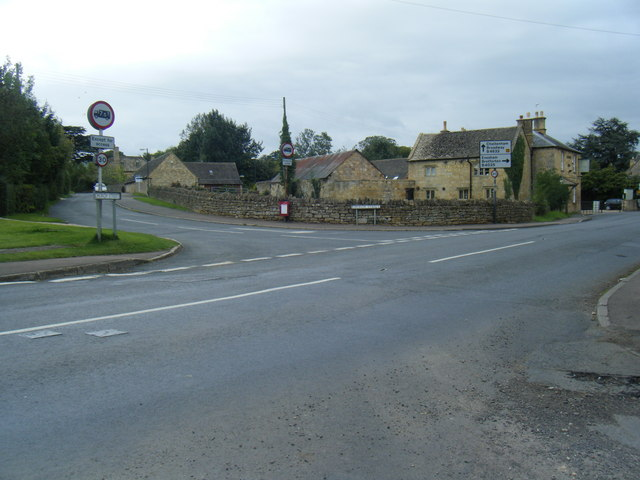
Weston-sub-Edge, William Weston's birthplace, present day

He matriculated from Christ Church, Oxford in 1564 and took his degree as Bachelor of Arts in 1569. He entered Middle Temple and was elected Bencher and Reader in 1585.

In the Parliament of 1593, he sat in the House of Commons of England as member for Weymouth and Melcombe Regis. A few months later he was appointed Chief Justice of the Court of Common Pleas (Ireland), with a knighthood. This was part of a Crown policy of appointing English-born judges to the most senior positions on the Irish Bench. The policy had only limited success: many English judges (though by no means all) complained of the dampness of the Irish climate, and due to the bad roads and the level of serious crime, they often refused to go on assize. Many of them sought to return to England as soon as a suitable vacancy on the English bench became available.

In the 1590s the authorities were greatly exercised, for reasons which are unclear, by a dispute between Andrew White and John Etchingham over which of them had the right to the possession of lands at Dunbrody, County Wexford. The matter was considered sufficiently important to be referred to the Privy Council of England, which referred it to the English High Court judges. They in turn recommended that it be referred to a high-powered commission consisting of the most senior Irish judges, including Weston. The Commission moved at a leisurely pace: in the summer of 1595 the English Council wrote to them concerning Weston's death the previous year, and nominating Sir Robert Dillon, his successor in the Common Pleas, as his replacement.

Weston's principal fault as a judge seems to have been inefficiency: he admitted that he could not keep order in his own court.

He went on an assize in Ulster in 1594 but fell ill there and died. He was survived by his widow and at least one son.
