= Bishop Duppa's Almshouses, Richmond =

Bishop Duppa’s Almshouses, Richmond
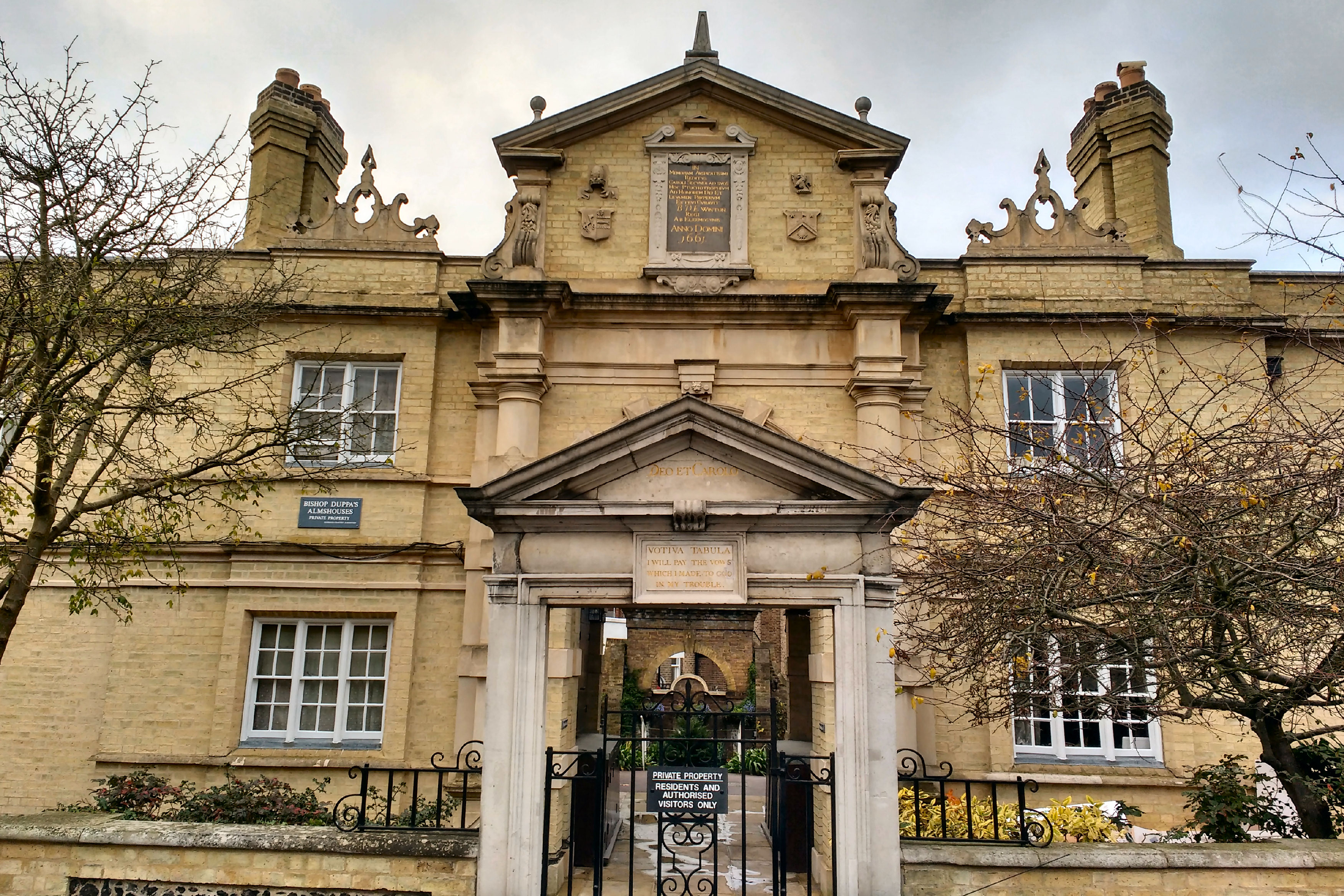
- Interactive map of Bishop Duppa’s Almshouses, Richmond
- 51.4581°N 0.3023°W
- Location: The Vineyard, Richmond, London, England

History
- Built: 1661 (on Richmond Hill)
- Rebuilt: 1851 (on present site)

Site notes
- Governing body: Richmond Charities

Listed Building – Grade II
- Official name: Bishop Duppa's Almshouses
- Designated: 10 January 1950
- Reference no.: 1253024

Bishop Duppa's Almshouses, Richmond are Grade II listed almshouses in Richmond, London. They were founded by Brian Duppa, Bishop of Winchester, in 1661 (during the reign of Charles II) to house ten unmarried women aged over 50.

These homes were originally built higher on, not on the lowest slopes of Richmond Hill. By 1850 they had become dilapidated. They were rebuilt in 1851 in The Vineyard, Richmond next to Queen Elizabeth's Almshouses but their 1661 front arch and gateway are believed to have been incorporated. The new site was provided by James Ewing, owner of the neighbouring Downe House, Richmond Hill/Downe House. He outlaid the funds for their rebuilding, in white brick to a Jacobean design by Thomas Little, receiving the old almshouse site in exchange.

Numbers 8, 9 and 10 were rebuilt in 1949 after London Blitz (i.e. World War Two) bomb damage.

The almshouses are now managed by The Richmond Charities. As assisted housing for the elderly, new residents must be at least 65 years of age, in other ways be eligible for public funds (benefits). By law the old criterion of belonging to the parish no longer applies.

== See also ==
- List of almshouses in the United Kingdom
