= Edward Loftus =

Irish barrister, judge and soldier

Sir Edward Loftus (1563–1601) was an Irish barrister, judge and soldier of the Elizabethan era.

He was born in Dublin, the second son of Adam Loftus, Archbishop of Dublin, and his wife Jane Purdon, daughter of James Purdon and Jane Little. His father was also Lord Chancellor of Ireland, and Edward followed him into the legal profession. He was Serjeant-at-law (Ireland) 1597–1601. His patent- of appointment states that it was given free: "for the patentee is a principal officer, according to the ancient custom" (what precisely is meant by "principal officer" is unclear). He held office very briefly as Recorder of Dublin. He was noted for his legal scholarship, and wrote a manual listing all the legal terms which were then in common usage in the Irish Courts.

He was also a professional soldier who fought in the Nine Years War, and was knighted for his services to the English Crown by Robert Devereux, 2nd Earl of Essex, in 1599. He was killed at the Siege of Kinsale on 10 May 1601.

He married Anne Duke, daughter and co-heiress with her sister Mary of Sir Henry Duke of Castlejordan, County Meath and his wife Elizabeth Brabazon, daughter of Sir William Brabazon, Vice-Treasurer of Ireland and his wife, the much-married heiress Elizabeth Clifford. She died in childbirth shortly after Edward's death; their only child, a daughter, lived just a few days. Edward and Anne are buried in the family vault which his father had built in St. Patrick's Cathedral, Dublin.

== Sources ==
- Hart, A. R. A History of the King's Serjeants at law in Ireland Dublin Four Courts Press 2000
- Lodge, John Peerage of Ireland London 1754
- Smyth, Constantine Joseph Chronicle of the Law Officers of Ireland London Butterworths 1839
- Stokes, Rev. Dudley Loftus- a Dublin Antiquary of the Seventeenth Century (1890) Journal of the Royal Society of Antiquaries of Ireland Series 5 Vol.1
