= Richmond Charities =

Almshouse charity based in Richmond, London, England

- Legal status: Registered charity
- Headquarters: Richmond, London
- Location: 8 The Green, Richmond TW9 1PL
- Region served: London Borough of Richmond upon Thames
- Chief Executive: Emma Halford
- Main organ: Almshouse News (quarterly newsletter)
- Budget: £4.5 million
- Website: www.richmondcharities.org.uk

The Richmond Charities is an almshouse charity based in Richmond, London. Its origins date back to 1600. The charity provides affordable housing for people in housing need. It also administers two relief-in-need welfare charities, a relief-in-sickness charity and a very small charity that awards small quarterly grants to four deserving spinsters.

The almshouses are for local people aged over 65, who are of limited means and require an improvement in their living conditions.

The charity's area of benefit is London Borough of Richmond upon Thames, in which the majority of the almshouse residents will have been living at the time of their appointment, but limited provision is made for the appointment of residents irrespective of their former place of residence. Preference is given to applicants living in private rented property.

As recently as 1943, residents of the almshouses received a monthly allowance of £2 5s. (£2.25p), together with three tons of coal a year, a dress or suit of clothes every other year, or a greatcoat every fifth year. Pensions continued to be paid for some years, but the position has now entirely changed, in that, where necessary, residents receive financial support within the state welfare system. They pay for the provision of central heating, where this is provided, and in addition pay a subsidised weekly maintenance contribution (WMC) towards the maintenance of the almshouses.

Residents pay their own household bills. They occupy the almshouses as beneficiaries of a charitable trust and do not have security of tenure. There are no longer any qualifications with regard to gender or religion.

The Richmond Charities has an endowment that has to be used for the benefit of its residents.

== The almshouses ==
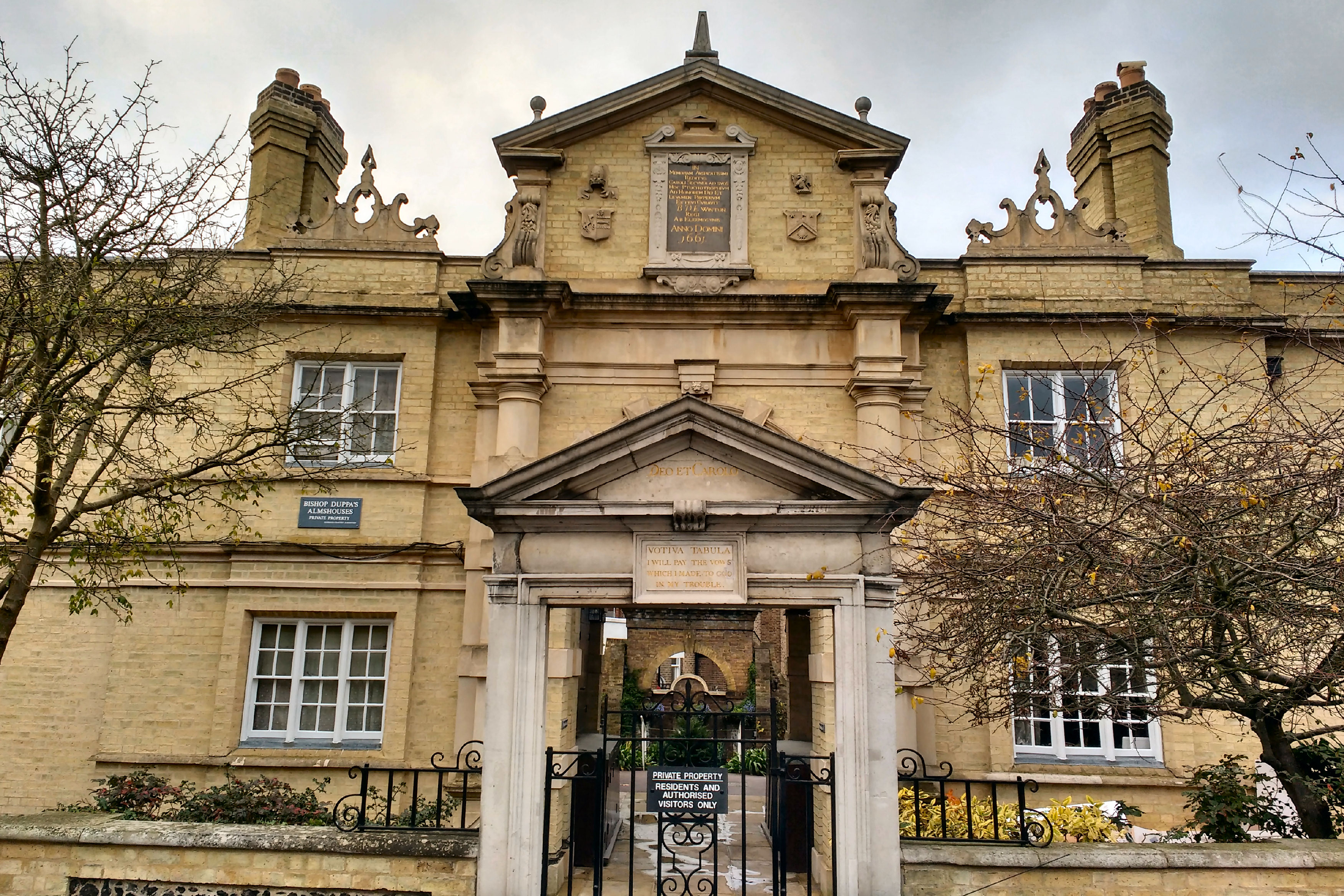
Bishop Duppa's Almshouses

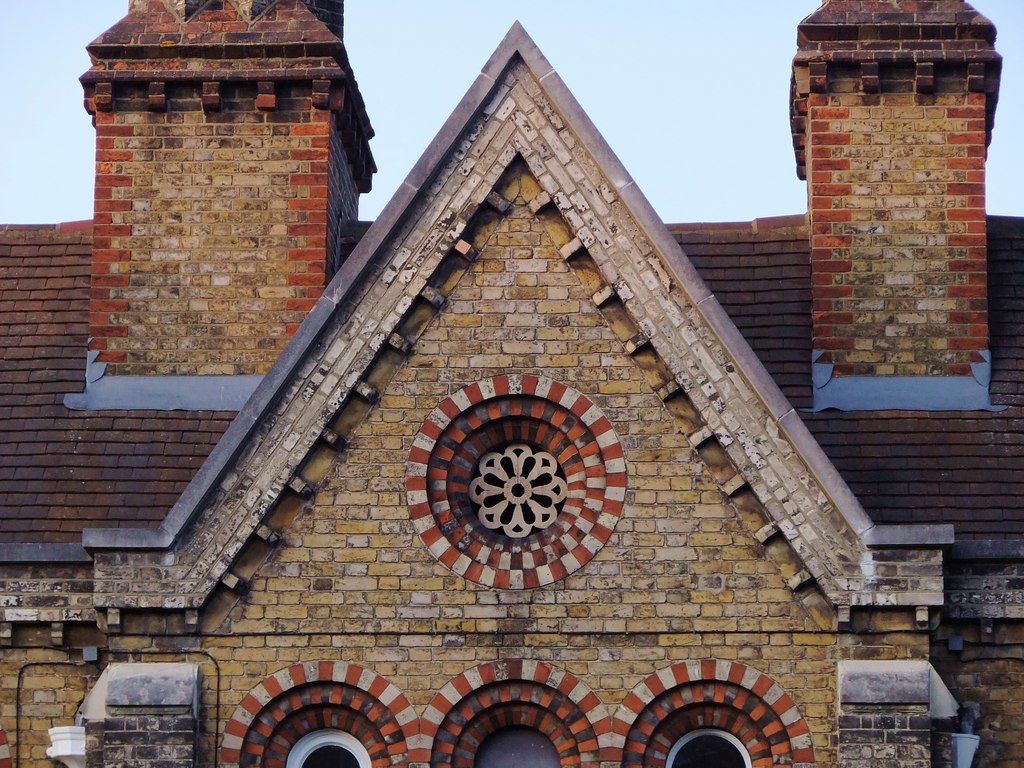
Church Estate Almshouses

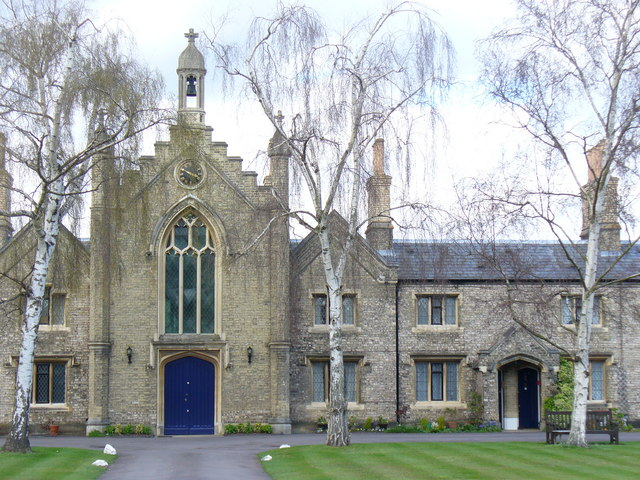
Hickey's Almshouses

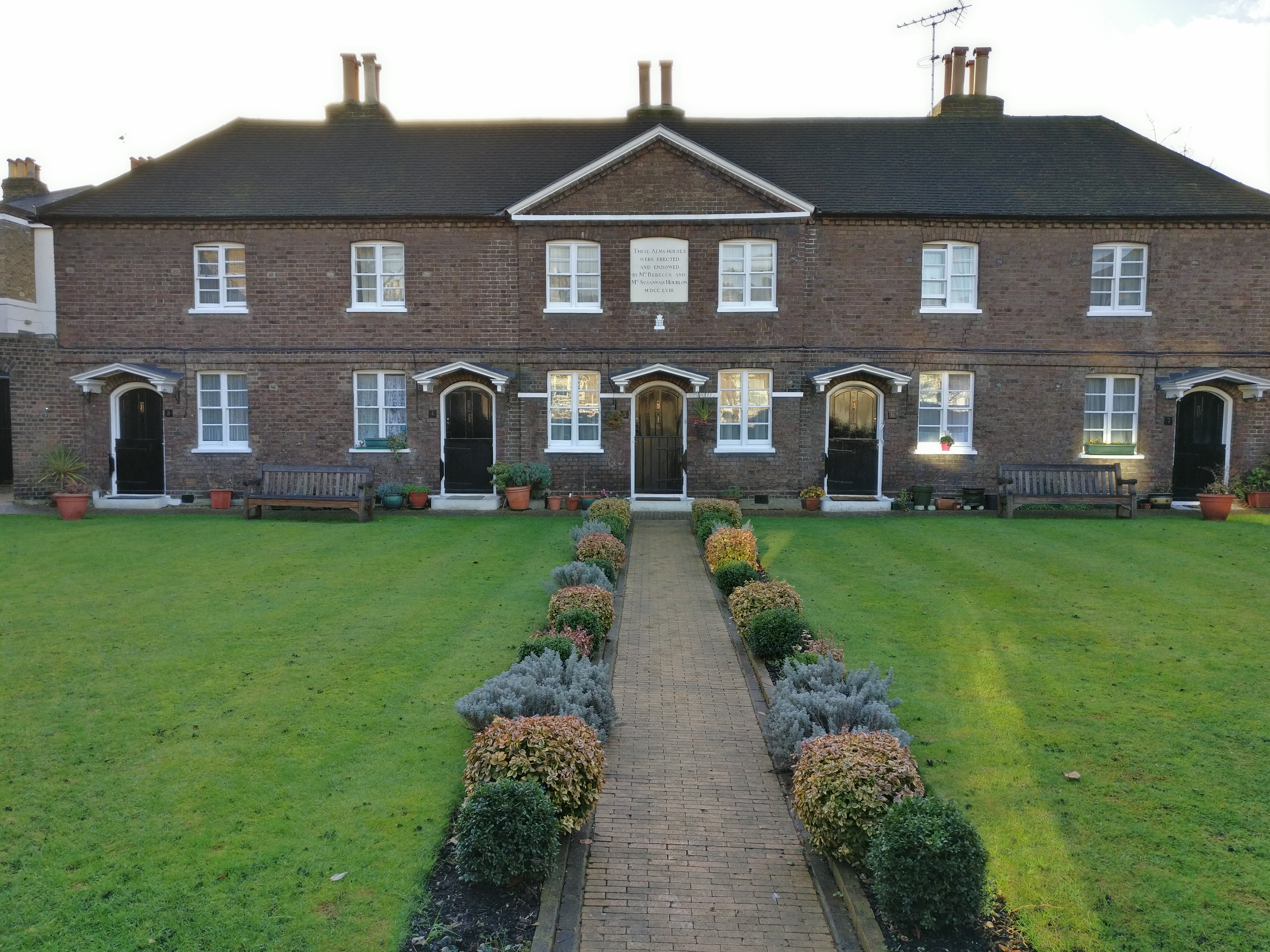
Houblon's Almshouses

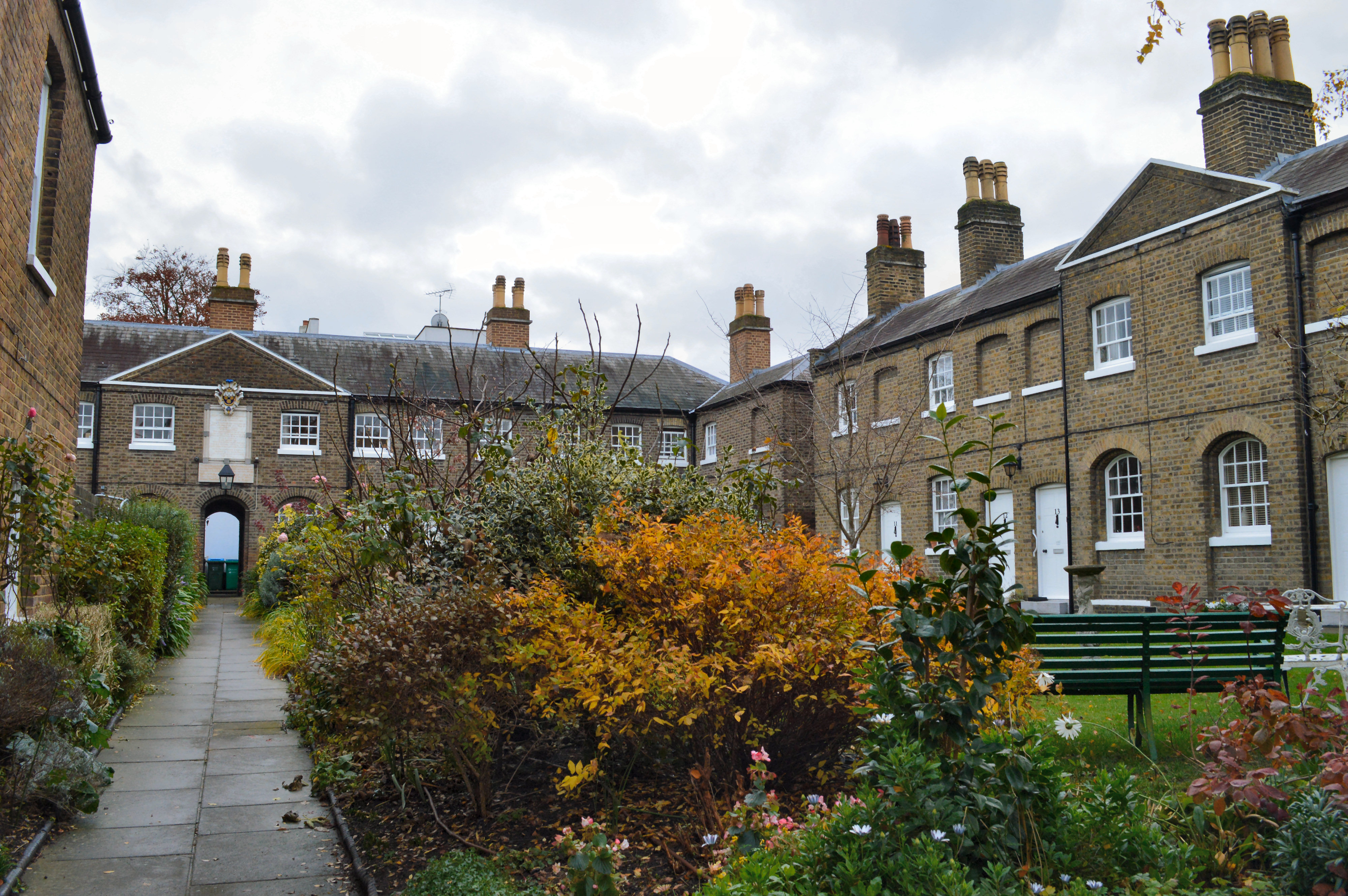
Michel's Almshouses

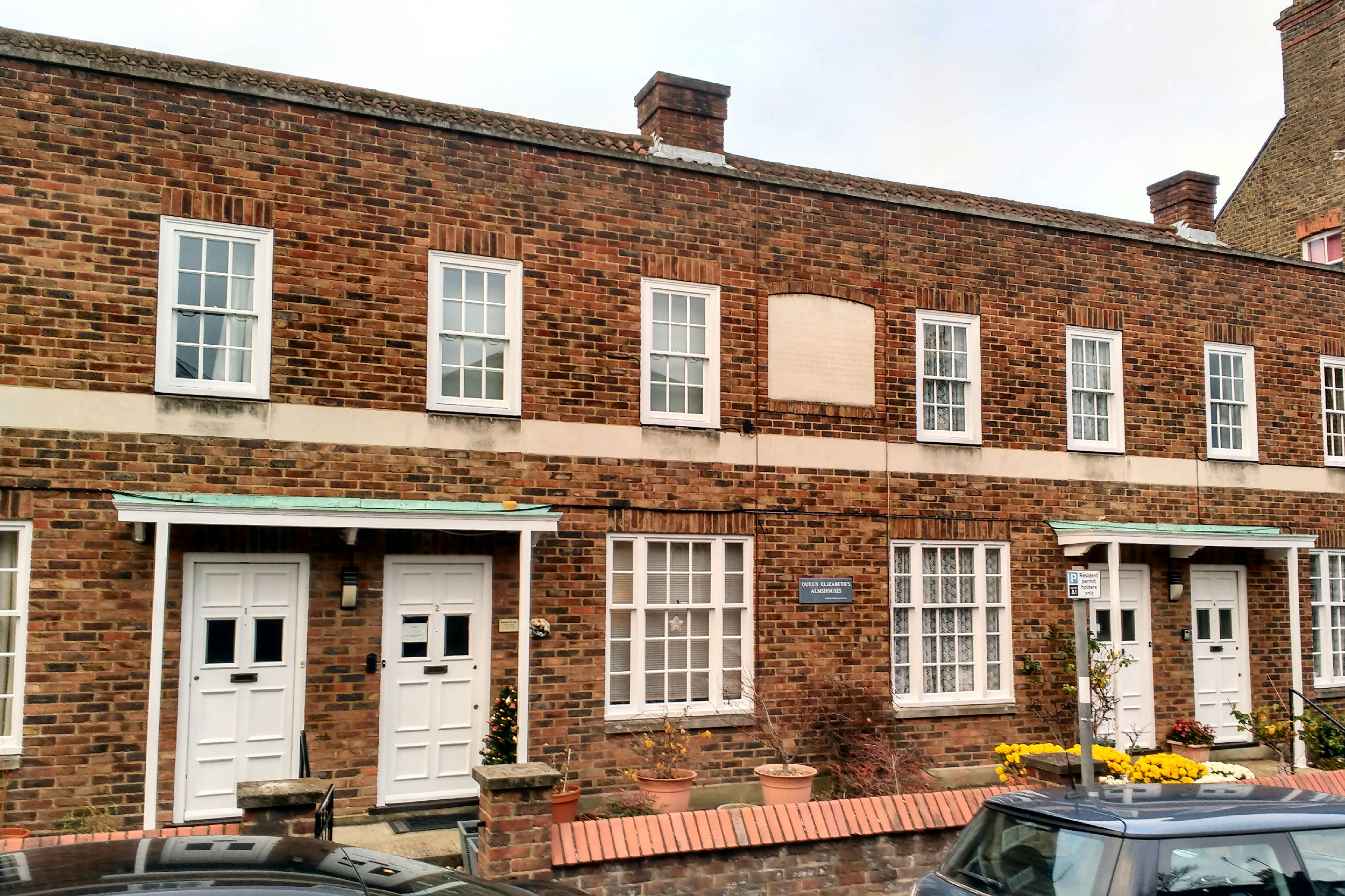
Queen Elizabeth's Almshouses

The Richmond Charities manages 145 almshouses on 13 sites in Richmond, Twickenham and Mortlake. They include 50 at Hickey's Almshouses; nine at Houblon's Almshouses; ten at Bishop Duppa's (founded by Brian Duppa, Bishop of Chichester); four at Queen Elizabeth's; 18 at Michel's Almshouses; five at Benn's Walk; 18 at Church Estate Almshouses, five at Elizabeth Twining Almshouses; and ten at Candler Almshouses. At Hickey's there is a chapel dedicated to St Francis of Assisi, the chaplain's house and two lodges for staff.

A new set of 12 almshouses, the Elizabeth Doughty Almshouses, will open on Queen's Road, Richmond in late 2025.

== Governance ==
The governing body of the charity is a board of ten trustees, which meets six times a year. Sub-committees meet to deal with finance, property, risk management and safeguarding.

== Staff ==
The Richmond Charities has 14 staff; Emma Halford is the Chief Executive.
