= Candler Almshouses =

Coordinates: 51°27′05″N 0°19′34″W

- Interactive map of Candler Almshouses
- Location: Twickenham, London Borough of Richmond upon Thames, England

History
- Built: 1936 (current buildings)

Site notes
- Governing body: Richmond Charities

Candler Almshouses are almshouses at 79 Amyand Park Road, Twickenham TW1 3HJ in the London Borough of Richmond upon Thames, England.

The ten almshouses are now managed by The Richmond Charities. New residents are accepted from 65 years of age.

The current almshouses were built in 1936. They are named after William Candler (1826–1907), a grocer in Twickenham who left money to build them. He is buried in Richmond Cemetery.

== See also ==
- List of almshouses in the United Kingdom
