= Catherine Fenton Boyle =

Irish aristocrat

Catherine, Countess of Cork
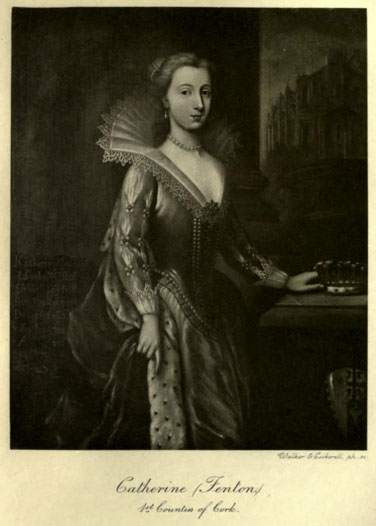
- Born: Catherine Fenton c. 1588
- Died: 16 May 1630 (aged 41–42); Cork House, Dublin
- Buried: St Patrick's Cathedral, Dublin
- Spouse: Richard Boyle, 1st Earl of Cork
- Father: Sir Geoffrey Fenton
- Mother: Alice Weston

The Rt Hon. Catherine Fenton Boyle, Countess of Cork (c.1588 – 16 February 1630), was an Anglo-Irish aristocrat and the wife of the 1st Earl of Cork.

== Biography ==
Catherine Fenton Boyle was born around 1588. She was the only daughter of Sir Geoffrey Fenton, the Secretary of State for Ireland 1580–1608, and Alice (née Weston). Her maternal grandfather was Robert Weston, Lord Chancellor of Ireland, and her grandmother was Alice Jenyngs. She had one brother, Sir William Fenton. On 25 July 1603, she married an Englishman, Richard Boyle, who was later created, in October 1620, 1st Earl of Cork. Her dowry of £1,000 allowed Boyle to purchase the estates of Sir Walter Raleigh in East Cork. She could have been as young as 15 at the time of the marriage, and Richard was 37. The age difference may have made Richard paternalistic towards Catherine, allowing her little freedom even in domestic affairs.

He oversaw the household accounts, purchased and chose his wife's clothes, did not allow her to borrow money, and did not seek her opinion on the education or marriages of their children. He commented on her as being "most religious, virtuous, loving and obedient". The family moved to Youghal in 1605, where Richard bought the lease of a former college, converting it into a home. He purchased the Chantry of our Blessed Saviour, and made it into a family mortuary chapel. Lord Cork, as he later became, was eventually buried there, but not Catherine, his wife. However, she is represented in the chapel by a marble effigy in the state robe of a countess.

Her husband purchased Lismore Castle, moving the family there, where the family divided their time between the castle and Cork House in Dublin. Catherine, Countess of Cork, as she was styled by that time, died on 16 February 1630 in Cork House, Dublin, and was buried with her father and grandfather in St Patrick's Cathedral. Her husband, the by now elderly Lord Cork, erected a marble tomb in their honour at the upper end of the chancel, but the new Lord Deputy of Ireland, Lord Wentworth, forced the movement of the tomb to the side of the cathedral. Lord Cork did not remarry, and dedicated the anniversary of her death to mourning each year. A book of elegies was printed in her honour, composed by the fellows of Trinity College, Dublin, titled Musarum Lachrymae.

== Issue ==
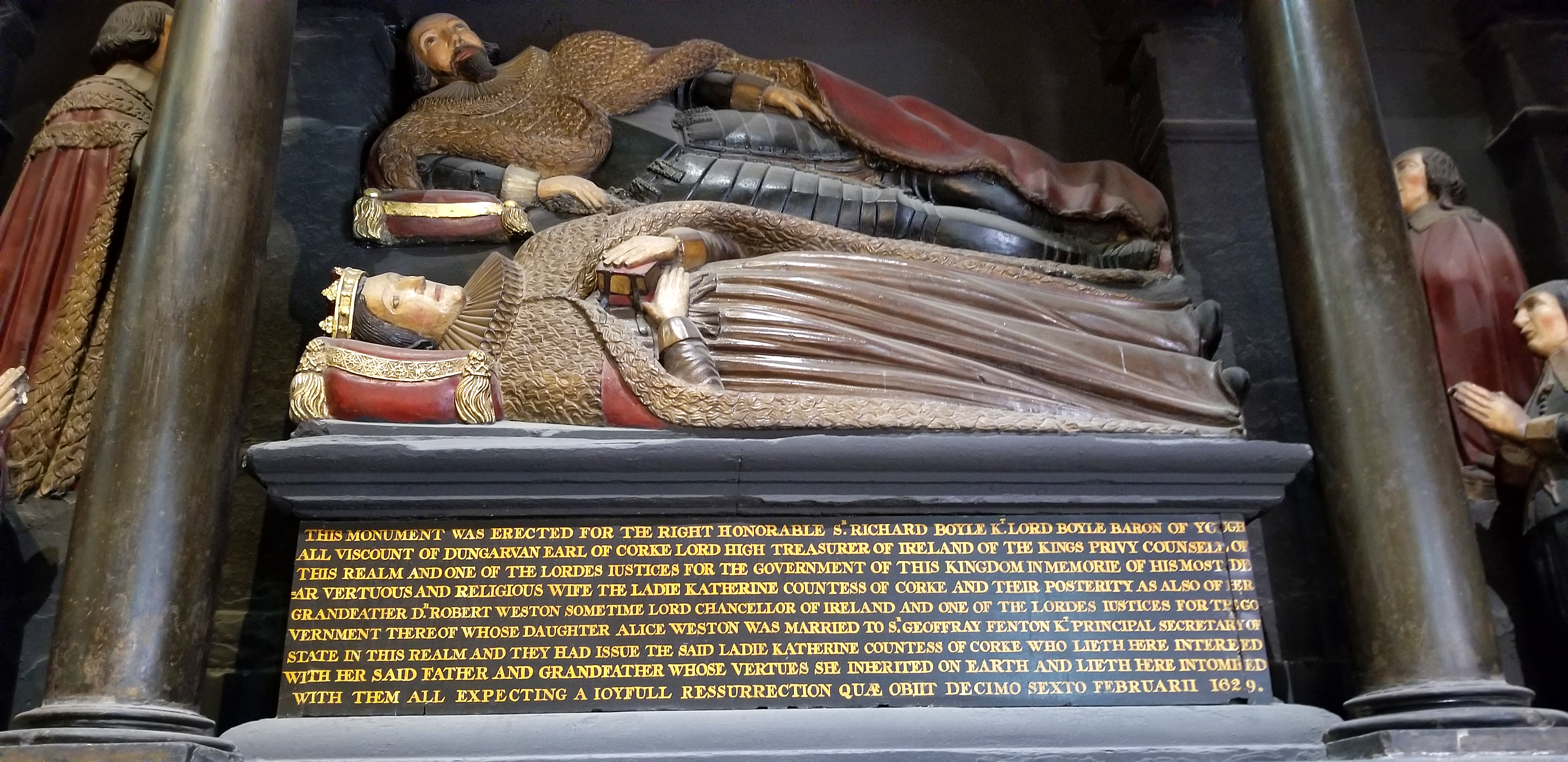
Boyles Monument in St. Patrick's Cathedral

Catherine, Countess of Cork, had 15 children with Richard, 1st Earl of Cork, 12 of whom survived into adulthood.

- Roger Boyle (25 April 1621, Youghal, County Cork, Ireland–16 October 1679, Deptford, Kent, England, where he was buried).
- Lady Alice Boyle (1607–1667), married the 1st Earl of Barrymore, then after his death, married John Barry, of Liscarroll, County Cork, Ireland.
- Lady Sarah Boyle (1609–1633), married Sir Thomas Moore, then after his death married the 1st Baron Digby.
- Lady Lettice Boyle (1610–1657), married Colonel Lord Goring.
- Lady Joan Boyle (1611–1657), married the 16th Earl of Kildare ("the Fairy Earl").
- Richard Boyle, 2nd Earl of Cork and 1st Earl of Burlington (1612–1698), Lord High Treasurer of Ireland (1660–1695).
- Lady Katherine Boyle (1615–1691), married the 2nd Viscount Ranelagh.
- Hon. Geoffrey Boyle (1616–1617)
- Lady Dorothy Boyle (1617–1668), married Sir Arthur Loftus of Rathfarnham and was the mother of the 1st Viscount Lisburne.
- Lewis Boyle, 1st Viscount Boyle of Kinalmeaky (1619–1642), succeeded under special remainder by his older brother Richard.
- Richard, 1st Earl of Orrery (1621–1679)
- Francis, 1st Viscount Shannon (1623–1699)
- Lady Mary Boyle (1625–1678), married the 4th Earl of Warwick.
- Hon. Robert Boyle (1627–1691), author of The Sceptical Chymist; considered to be the father of modern chemistry.
- Lady Margaret Boyle (1629–1637)
