= Geoffrey Fenton =

English writer (c. 1539–1608)

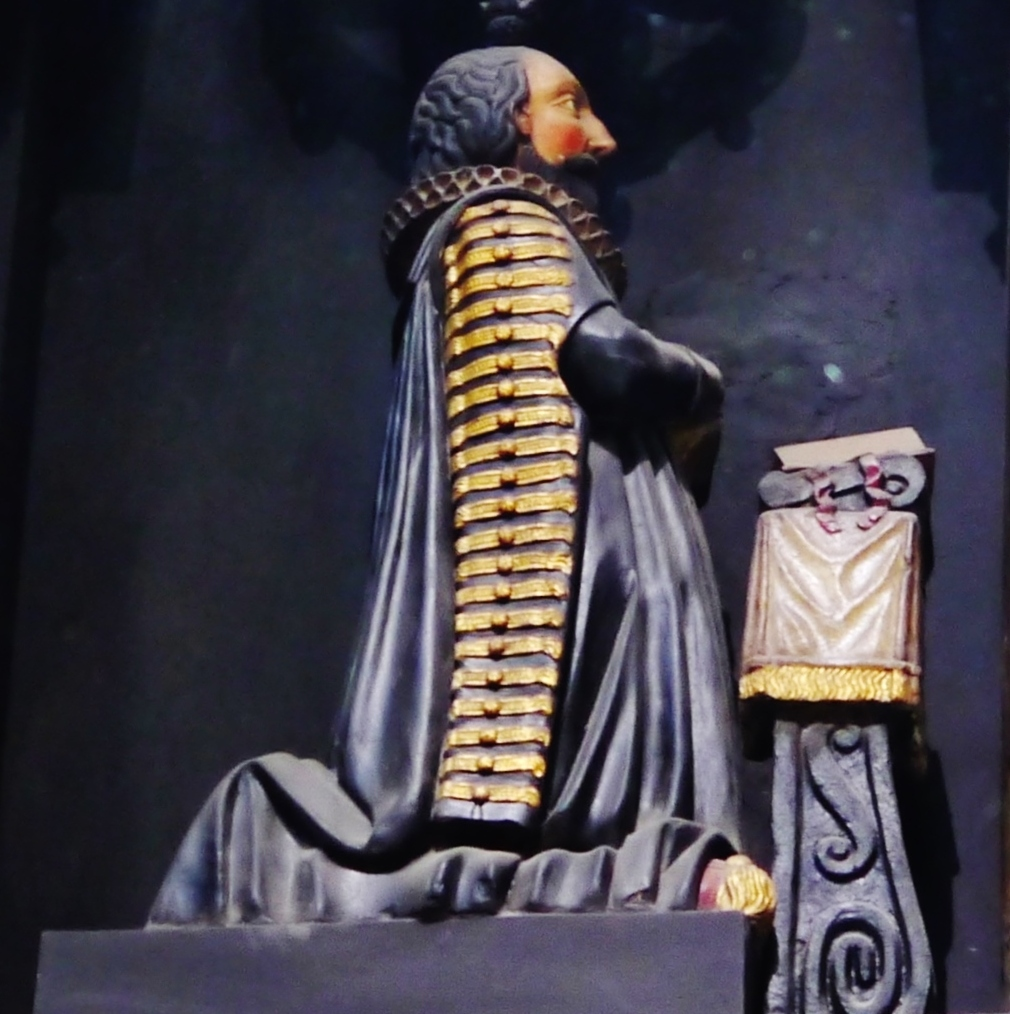
- memorial effigy in St. Patrick's Cathedral, Dublin
- Born: c. 1539
- Died: 19 October 1608 (aged 68–69); Dublin
- Occupation: Translator
- Spouse(s): Alice Weston
- Children: Catherine Fenton Boyle, Sir William Fenton
- Parent(s): Henry Fenton; Cicely Beaumont
- Relatives: Edward Fenton

Sir Geoffrey Fenton (c. 1539 – 19 October 1608) was in his younger life a productive English writer of translations from French-language sources during the Elizabethan era. He went on to have a prominent career in service to the Crown in Ireland, as Privy Councillor and Principal Secretary of State in Ireland. He was thoroughly Protestant in outlook and somewhat remorseless in pursuing his causes.

== Literary years ==
Geoffrey (spelled "Jeffrey" by John Lodge) was born in 1539, the son of Henry Fenton of Sturton-le-Steeple, Nottinghamshire, England and Cicely Beaumont, daughter of Richard Beaumont of Coleorton Hall, Leicestershire, and was the brother of Edward Fenton the navigator.

Geoffrey is said to have visited Spain and Italy in his youth: at any rate, this might reflect his efforts to bring Italian and Spanish-language sources into English through intermediate French versions. Possibly he went to Paris in Sir Thomas Hoby's train in 1566, for he was living there in 1567 when he penned the dedicatory epistle of his first notable publication, Certaine Tragicall Discourses, a collection of moral tales in the Histoires tragiques genre. Until 1579 his literary endeavours appeared under the following titles:

- Certaine Tragicall Discourses written oute of Frenche and Latin, by Geffraie Fenton (Thomas Marshe, London 1567), freely translated by Fenton from François de Belleforest's French rendering of Matteo Bandello's Novelle, and dedicated to Lady Mary Sydney. Full page-views at Internet Archive.
- An Epistle or Godlie Admonition of a learned minister... sent to the pastoures of the Flemish church in Antwerp (Henry Bynneman, London 1569), translated by Fenton from a French edition of a work by Antonio del Corro, and dedicated to John Byron, Esquire (in whose company he spent part of summer 1569). Full text at Umich/eebo (University of Michigan).
- A Discourse of the Civile Warres and Late Troubles in Fraunce (Henry Bynneman, London ? 1570), translated by Fenton from Memoires de la III. Guerre Civile et des Derniers Troubles de France sous Charles IX (1570) attributed to Jean de Serres, and dedicated to Sir Henry Sidney.
- Actes of Conference in Religion, Holden at Paris, betweene Two Papist Doctours of Sorbone, and Two Godlie Ministers of the Church (H. Bynneman, for William Norton and Humfrie Toye, London ? 1571), translated from the French by Fenton, and dedicated to the Lady Hobbie. Full page-views at Internet Archive.
- Monophylo, Drawne into English by Geffray Fenton. A Philosophicall Discourse, and Division of Love (Henry Denham for William Seres, London 1572); translated by Fenton from Le Monophyle of Etienne Pasquier, and dedicated to Lady Hobby. Full text at Umich/eebo (University of Michigan).
- A forme of Christian pollicie drawne out of French by Geffray Fenton (H. Middelton for Rafe Newbery, London 1574), adapted by Fenton from the Catholic treatise La Police Chrestienne of Jean Talpin (Paris 1568), and dedicated to Sir William Cecil, Lord Burghley. Full text at Umich/eebo.
- The Golden Epistles, Contayning Varietie of Discourse both Morall, Philosophicall and Divine... (Henry Middelton for Rafe Newbery, London 1575); translated by Fenton from Jean de Guterry's French version of the Epistolas Familiares of Antonio de Guevara, and dedicated to the Lady Anne, Countess of Oxenford. Full page-views at Internet Archive.
- The Historie of Guicciardin conteining the Warres of Italie and other Partes (Thomas Vautroullier, London 1579); translated by Fenton from the French version by Jérôme Chomedey of the work of Francesco Guicciardini, and dedicated to Queen Elizabeth. Full page-views of 1599 edition (Richard Field, London) at Internet Archive.

Several of the title-pages of these works carry the motto "Mon heur viendra", meaning "My hour will come": although arms and a crest for Sir Geoffrey himself are described by Burke, this motto is not mentioned by him, and may have expressed personal aspiration, much as the dedications of his books aspire towards a certain class of patronage.

== Ireland ==
Through Lord Burghley he obtained, in 1580, the post of secretary to the new Lord Deputy of Ireland, Lord Grey de Wilton, and thus became a fellow worker with the poet, Edmund Spenser. Fenton thereafter abandoned literature for service to the Crown in Ireland. He proved himself a zealous Protestant, who worked against the "diabolicall secte" of Rome, and urged the assassination of the Crown's most dangerous subjects. With Edward Waterhouse he oversaw the torture of Archbishop Dermot O'Hurley in 1584 in an interrogation for high treason. He secured the Queen's confidence with his written reports, but was arrested at Dublin in 1587 by the authority of the Lord Deputy, Sir John Perrot, on account of his debts, and was paraded in chains through the city. He was soon released, and made himself an instrument in Perrot's downfall in the following years.

In 1589 Fenton was knighted, and in 1590–1591 he acted as a Commissioner at London in the controversial impeachment of Perrot, which concluded when a death sentence was passed upon the former governor. By 1603 he was Principal Secretary of State, and Privy Councillor, in Ireland.

The policies Fenton promoted in relation to woodlands in the Plantations encouraged short-term commercial exploitation and clearance for agriculture, giving little weight to their conservation as a strategic resource.

== Later life ==
Fenton is said to have disliked the Scots and in particular James VI of Scotland, so upon James's succession to the English crown as James I of England, Fenton's post was in danger, but Cecil exerted himself in his favour, and in 1604 it was confirmed to him for life, though he had to share it with Sir Richard Coke. Fenton died in 1608, and was buried in St Patrick's Cathedral, Dublin.

== Family ==
Fenton married in June 1585, Alice, daughter of Dr Robert Weston (formerly Lord Chancellor of Ireland, 1567-1573) by his first wife Alice Jenyngs, and widow of Dr Hugh Brady, bishop of Meath 1563-1584. They had two children:

- Sir William Fenton, married Margaret, daughter of Morrice FitzEdmond FitzGibon FitzGerald.
- Catherine Fenton, who in 1603 married Richard Boyle, 1st Earl of Cork. Among their fifteen children was Robert Boyle, co-founder of the Royal Society.

The Parsons family of Birr Castle, who hold the title Earl of Rosse, are collateral descendants of Fenton through his sister Catherine, who married James Parsons of Leicestershire.
