= John Tatham (academic) =

John Tatham was an Oxford college head in the 16th-century.

Tatham was a Fellow of Merton College, Oxford, from 1563 to 1576. He was Proctor in 1573 and became Rector of Lincoln College, Oxford, in 1574. He also held the living at Waterstock. He was buried at All Saints Church, Oxford, on 30 November 1576.
