= Hickey's Almshouses =

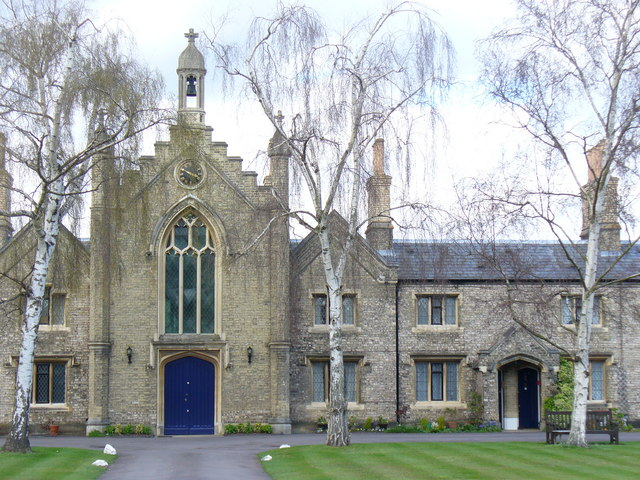
- Interactive map of the Hickey's Almshouses area

General information
- Architectural style: Neo-Tudor
- Location: Richmond, London Borough of Richmond upon Thames, England
- Coordinates: 51.4624°N 0.2904°W
- Completed: 1834
- Governing body: The Richmond Charities

Design and construction
- Architects: Original houses by Lewis Vulliamy; Chapel enlarged in 1863 by Arthur Blomfield

Listed Building – Grade II*
- Official name: Hickey's Almshouses, including chapel and lodges
- Designated: 10 January 1950
- Reference no.: 1262108

Hickey's Almshouses are almshouses between Sheen Road and St Mary's Grove in Richmond, London.

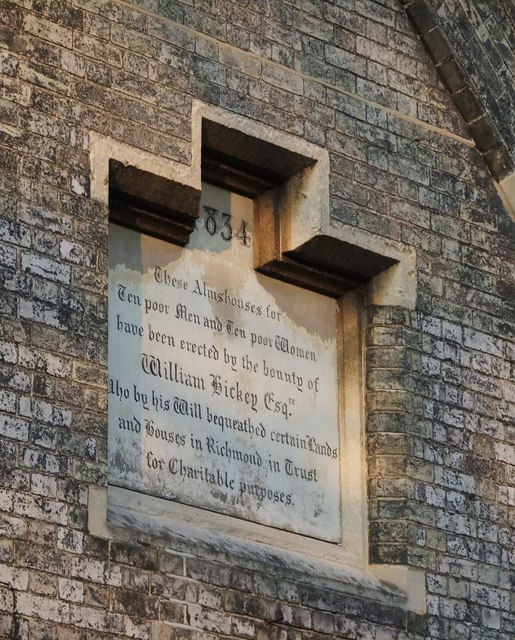
1834 inscription at Hickey's Almshouses

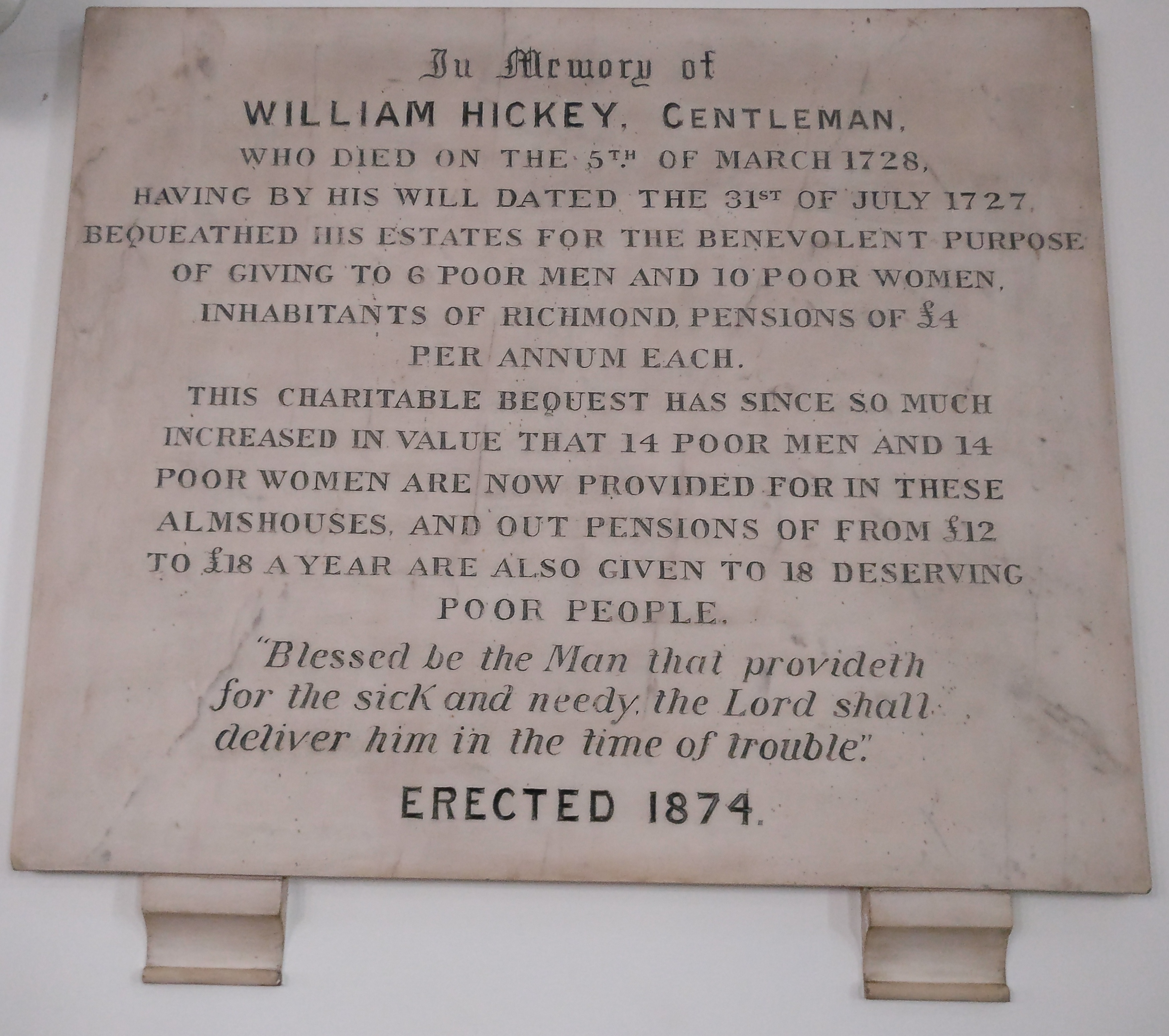
William Hickey memorial in Chapel of St Francis

A plaque over the entrance records that the almshouses were built "for Ten poor Men and Ten poor Women by the bounty of William Hickey Esq. Who by his Will bequeathed certain Lands and houses in Richmond in Trust for Charitable purposes". William Hickey, (Note: The renowned Richmond historian John Cloake says that very little is known about Hickey other than his generosity to the poor and the fact that he named trustees in his will to manage his bequests. According to Cloake, Hickey was a Roman Catholic (although he was buried at Richmond's Church of England parish church) and "the only one in Richmond to figure in a list of non-juror landowners in 1715". John Cloake (2011). "The Houses on the Terrace, Richmond Hill". Richmond History: Journal of the Richmond Local History Society. 32: 33–34. ISSN 0263-0958.) who died in 1727 and is buried in an altar tomb in the churchyard of St Mary Magdalene, Richmond, left the income of several properties on Richmond Hill, including The Wick, in trust to provide pensions for six men and ten women. In 1822 the charity's funds were boosted by a major donation by Elizabeth Doughty.

Twenty almshouses, designed by Lewis Vulliamy, in Neo-Tudor style with high chimneys, were built in 1834 from the trust's income. These are Grade II* listed and Historic England's listing also extends to the site's chapel (which is dedicated to St Francis), also built in 1834 and its two gate lodges. A later block of almshouses, built in 1851 in the same style as the main quadrangle, is listed at Grade II.

The property, which includes another 29 buildings behind the almshouses, now consists of 49 flats and cottages, a laundry and a workshop.

The almshouses are managed by The Richmond Charities. New residents are accepted from 65 years of age.

== Chapel of St Francis ==
The chapel, which was enlarged in 1863 by Arthur Blomfield, is dedicated to St Francis of Assisi. It includes a memorial tablet, dated 1874, that commemorates William Hickey.

== See also ==
- List of almshouses in the United Kingdom
