= John Bridges (bishop) =

English bishop

John Bridges (1536–1618) was an English bishop.

== Life ==
Born in 1536, he graduated M.A. at Pembroke Hall, Cambridge in 1560, having been a Fellow there since 1556. He became Dean of Salisbury in 1577.

He was appointed Bishop of Oxford on the accession of James I of England, and took part in the Hampton Court Conference, in 1604.

== Works ==
A Defence of the Government Established in the Church of England for Ecclesiastical Matters (1587) was a controversial work, expanded to 1400 pages from a Paul's Cross sermon, aimed at the theories of church polity of Thomas Cartwright, Laurence Chaderton and Walter Travers in defence of the current Church of England settlement. It brought replies by Dudley Fenner and Travers. It also provoked the first of the tracts by Martin Marprelate, Oh read over D. John Bridges ... Printed at the cost and charges of M. Marprelate gentleman (1588).

He was formerly considered a possible author of Gammer Gurton's Needle, now attributed to William Stevenson.

== A fool and his money quote ==
Bridges is known to have coined the phrase, "a fool and his money are soon parted," originally written in the 1587 Defence treatise. It is in Book 15 (of 16) of the conformist magnum opus, written about a century before nonconformism was popular in the Church of England. Bridges' Defence was openly against the presbyterianism of early nonconformists, including Puritans. Bridges' piece was not the first of the John Whitgift-era attacks on Puritanical beliefs that began when he was elevated to Archbishop of Canterbury in 1583. It was a follow-up of Answer To the two first and principall Treatises of a certeine factious libell, put forth latelie by Richard Cosin in 1584.

In Defence and factious libel, the two authors are replying to an anonymous Puritan work known as An Abstract, Of Certain Acts of parliament... published around 1584, exhibiting "the hallmarks of being compiled by a Puritan lawyer." The Conformists both pushed back against the Puritan's complaints about registration fees, designed to make it difficult for Puritan ministers to be able to make a living in the Church of England.

Bridges contends with the Puritan's arguments against priests being registered, obtaining their living from the selling of books, and receiving free dinners as a means of income. He condescendingly refers to the Puritan complainer as "a foole" for paying a penny or twopence more than the market price for a bishop's book:

From dinner they come to selling and buying of bookes.

Neither is this worthie their learned discourse, nor yet can bee much misse, if ought amisse at all, so that the buyer haue ware worth his money. Call they this pillage?

Yea, say they, whereby they compell men to buye bookes of them.

I doe not thinke that they compell any: for if they list, they may buye them in other places. So that this is but a gentle compulsion to buye the bookes of them. Although, to appoynt some bookes meete for them, and to compell them to haue such bookes, is both lawfull and conuenient. If they maye haue them there, it is their more ease that buye them, and if they pay a penie or two pence more for the reddinesse of them, and for his charge that prouided them, let them looke to that, a foole and his money is soone parted. And must this also bee inserted into this learned discourse?

No meruell if they forget not the greater and dearer bookes, when they remember a booke of a groate or two pence? But belike, some of these our Bretheren met with a hard hukster, or els they are ouer hard handed, if not worse affected, to any of those bookes, of which, if they might set the price, though the booke were well worth two or three shillings, would they not yet thinke it too deare of a penie or twopence? Loe, how easie a matter it is to finde a sticke to beate a dogge; to picke a quarrell at euery small offence, when one is disposed to cauill.

== Notes ==
Church of England titles
Preceded by John Underhill	Bishop of Oxford; 1604–1618	Succeeded by John Howson
