= John Prestwich =

British antiquarian

- Died: 15 August 1795; Dublin
- Occupation: Antiquarian

John Prestwich (died 15 August 1795), also called "Sir John", was a British antiquarian.

== Biography ==
Prestwich was the son of Sir Elias Prestwich of Holme and Prestwich, Lancashire, and a lineal descendant of Thomas Prestwich, who was created a baronet in 1644. He always claimed the title of baronet, though the claim was not officially allowed. He died at Dublin on 15 August 1795.

His works are:

1. ‘Dissertation on Mineral, Animal, and Vegetable Poisons,’ 1775, 8vo.
2. ‘Prestwich's Respublica, or a Display of the Honors, Ceremonies, and Ensigns of the Common Wealth under the Protectorship of Oliver Cromwell; together with the Names, Armorial Bearings, Flags, and Pennons of the different Commanders of English, Scotch, Irish, Americans, and French; and an Alphabetical Roll of the Names and Armorial Bearings of upwards of Three Hundred Families of the present Nobility and Gentry of England, Scotland, and Ireland,’ London, 1787, 4to. This curious heraldic work is inscribed to Lord Sydney. Notwithstanding its title, it is replete with loyalty. In the British Museum there is a copy with indices of names and mottoes in manuscript.

Prestwich left unpublished an incomplete ‘Historical Account of South Wales’ and a ‘History of Liverpool,’ which was withheld, by the author's direction, on a similar work being announced by John Holt.
