= Queen Elizabeth's Almshouses, Richmond =

Almshouses in Richmond, southwest London

Queen Elizabeth’s Almhouses, Richmond
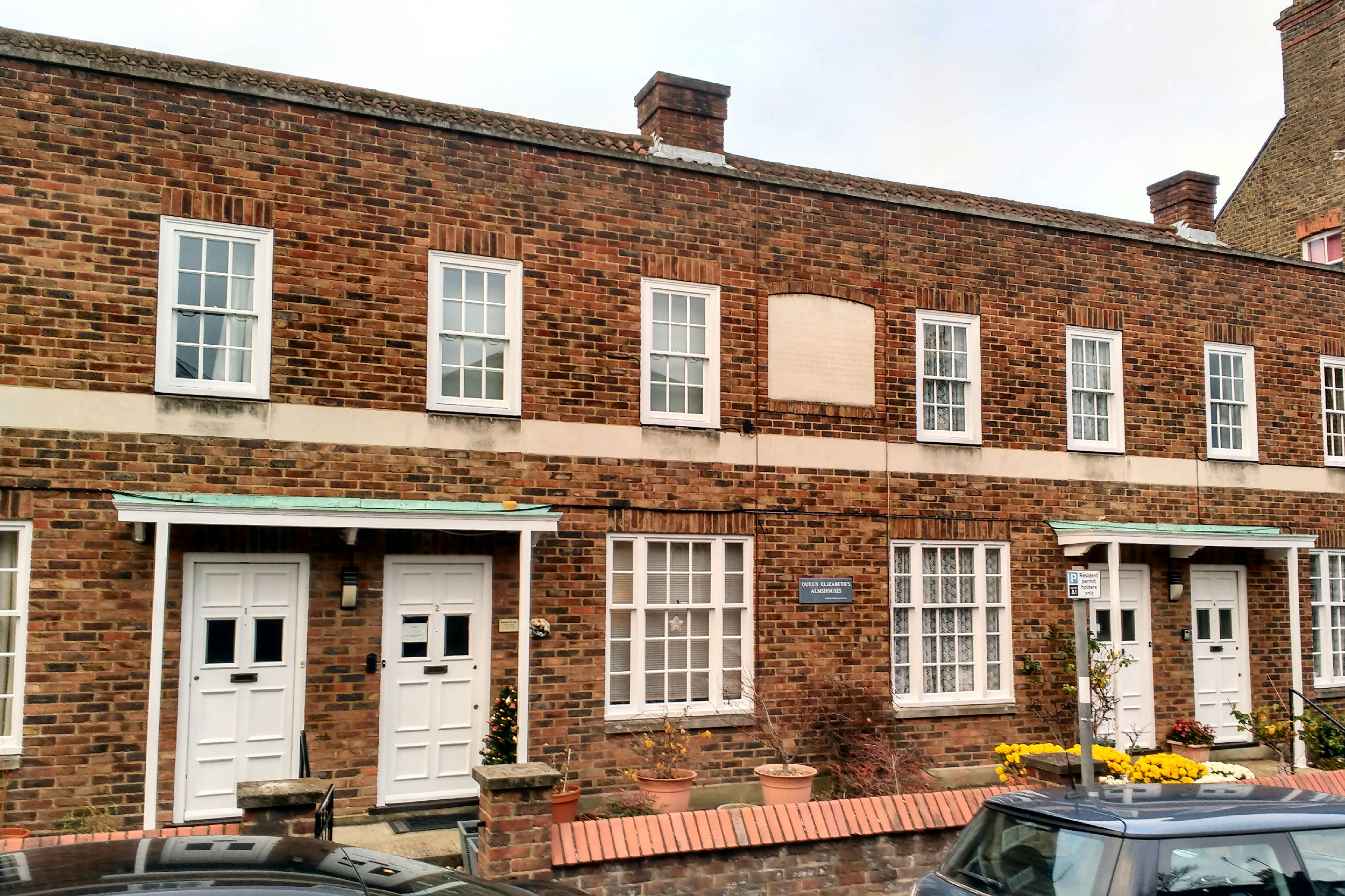
- Interactive map of Queen Elizabeth’s Almhouses, Richmond
- 51°27′30″N 0°18′07″W
- Location: The Vineyard, Richmond, London, England

History
- Built: 1600 (on previous Petersham Road site)
- Built for: Sir George Wright
- Rebuilt: 1767 (on present site); 1857 and 1955

Queen Elizabeth's Almhouses are almshouses in Richmond, London, founded by Sir George Wright in 1600 (during the reign of Elizabeth I) to house eight poor aged women. Known originally as the "lower almshouses", they were built in Petersham Road, a few hundred yards south of what is now Bridge Street. By 1767, they were almost derelict. In 1767, William Turner rebuilt the almshouses on land at the top end of his estate in The Vineyard. Funds for the rebuilding were raised by public subscription. The almshouses were rebuilt again in 1857. They were damaged during World War II and replaced with four newly built houses in 1955.

== Current status ==
The almshouses are now managed by The Richmond Charities. New residents are accepted from 65 years of age.

== See also ==
- List of almshouses in the United Kingdom
