= Thomas O'Shaughnessy =

Irish judge and barrister (1850–1933)

Judge of the High Court
- In office 1 August 1924 – 20 December 1925
- Nominated by: Government of Ireland
- Appointed by: Tim Healy

Personal details
- Born: 22 December 1850 Dublin, Ireland
- Died: 7 March 1933 (aged 82) Fitzwilliam Square, Dublin, Ireland
- Spouse: Catherine Trueman (m. 1878)
- Children: 4
- Education: Queens College Galway; King's Inns; Middle Temple

Sir Thomas Lopdell O'Shaughnessy, KC (22 December 1850 – 7 March 1933) was an Irish judge and barrister who served as a Judge of the High Court from 1924 to 1925. He was the last Recorder of Dublin in Ireland.

== Early life ==
O'Shaughnessy was born on 22 December 1850 in Dublin, as the son of Thomas O'Shaughnessy and Mary Lopdell. He married Catherine Trueman in 1879 and they had four children. He died at his home in Fitzwilliam Square, Dublin on 7 March 1933. Educated at Queens College Galway, he was called to the Irish Bar in 1874 and to the English Bar by Middle Temple in 1894.

== Legal career ==
O'Shaughnessy carried out his practice on the Connaught and North Eastern Circuit. He served as counsel to the plaintiffs in relation to the disastrous rail accident during a school outing from Armagh to Newry. O'Shaughnessy won a great reputation from this trial, and took silk (an informal term for Queen's Counsel) soon after. For fifteen years, he was one of the most influential, effective and well-paid barristers of the Dublin Four Courts, and was regarded as a mentor to younger barristers.

Maurice Healy remarked that there was a rather unfriendly rivalry between himself and William Huston Dodd as to which of them was entitled to be called "Leader of the Bar". He was sworn in as Recorder of Dublin in 1905. He would be the last to hold this position, a role which stretched back to James Stanihurst in 1564. The Recordership was abolished in 1924 and O'Shaughnessy became a judge in the High Court of the Irish Free State.

== Judicial career ==
O'Shaughnessy was appointed a High Court judge in August 1924. His tenure on bench was brief, as resigned from his judicial office in 1925. He then went onto to receive a knighthood in 1927. He was a Bencher of the King's Inns and was sworn in as a member of the Irish Privy Council in 1912. He was a member of the Reform Club.
