= Frederick Falkiner =

Frederick Falkiner may refer to:

- Sir Frederick Falkiner, 1st Baronet (1768–1824), Irish MP for Athy and Dublin County, British MP for Dublin County and Carlow Borough
- Frederick Falkiner (judge) (1831–1908), Irish judge, lawyer and author
