= List of Irish MPs 1569–1571 =

This is a list of members elected to the Irish House of Commons in 1569. The parliament sat until 1571.

| Name | Constituency | Notes |
|---|---|---|
| Christopher Barnewall | County Dublin | Effective Leader of the Opposition |
| Sir Edmund Butler of Cloughgrenan | | |
| Lucas Dillon | County Meath | Attorney-General |
| John Hooker | Athenry | Legal adviser to Sir Peter Carew |
| James Stanihurst | | Speaker |

Sir Humphrey Gilbert may have been a member., citing
