= Peter Palmer (judge) =

English-born judge in Ireland

Peter Palmer (died 1621) was an English-born judge who served in Ireland for many years, into extreme old age.

He was born at Waddesdon, Buckinghamshire, son of William Palmer (died 1595) and his wife Joyce, and grandson of Thomas Palmer. The Palmers leased the main mansion in Waddesdon as tenants of the Crown. Peter entered Lincoln's Inn as a student in 1562, but was not called to the Bar until 1579. He was fined for not acting as steward at the Reader's dinner in Lincoln's Inn in 1583.

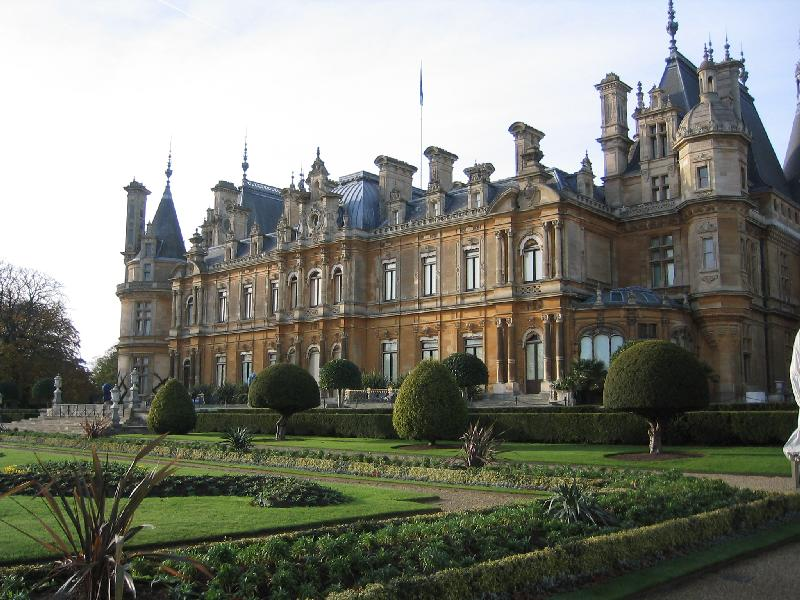
Waddesdon, Buckinghamshire, Palmer's birthplace

He was sent to Ireland as second justice of the Court of Common Pleas (Ireland) in 1600. Patrick Fitzgerald, the former Recorder of Dublin, had been appointed to the Common Pleas earlier the same year, (having acted as a temporary judge for several years) but for reasons which are not clear Fitzgerald's permanent appointment to the Common Pleas was simply disregarded.

After the establishment of the assize system in Ireland, Palmer was diligent in going on circuit, even in old age. When the King's Inns, which had been moribund for some time, was revived in 1607, Palmer was one of several judges who became members, to boost its prestige. He was party to the deed of 1612 by which the English Crown vested "Blackfriars" (now Blackhall Place) in the High Court judges as Trustees of the King's Inns.

Although he was described as an old man by 1611, he continued to go on assize in Leinster until 1618. He died in 1621, still in office, and is buried in St. Werburgh's Church, Dublin. His widow, whose family name was Newce, died in 1625. They appear to have had no children, and his heirs sold the Waddesdon property in 1623.

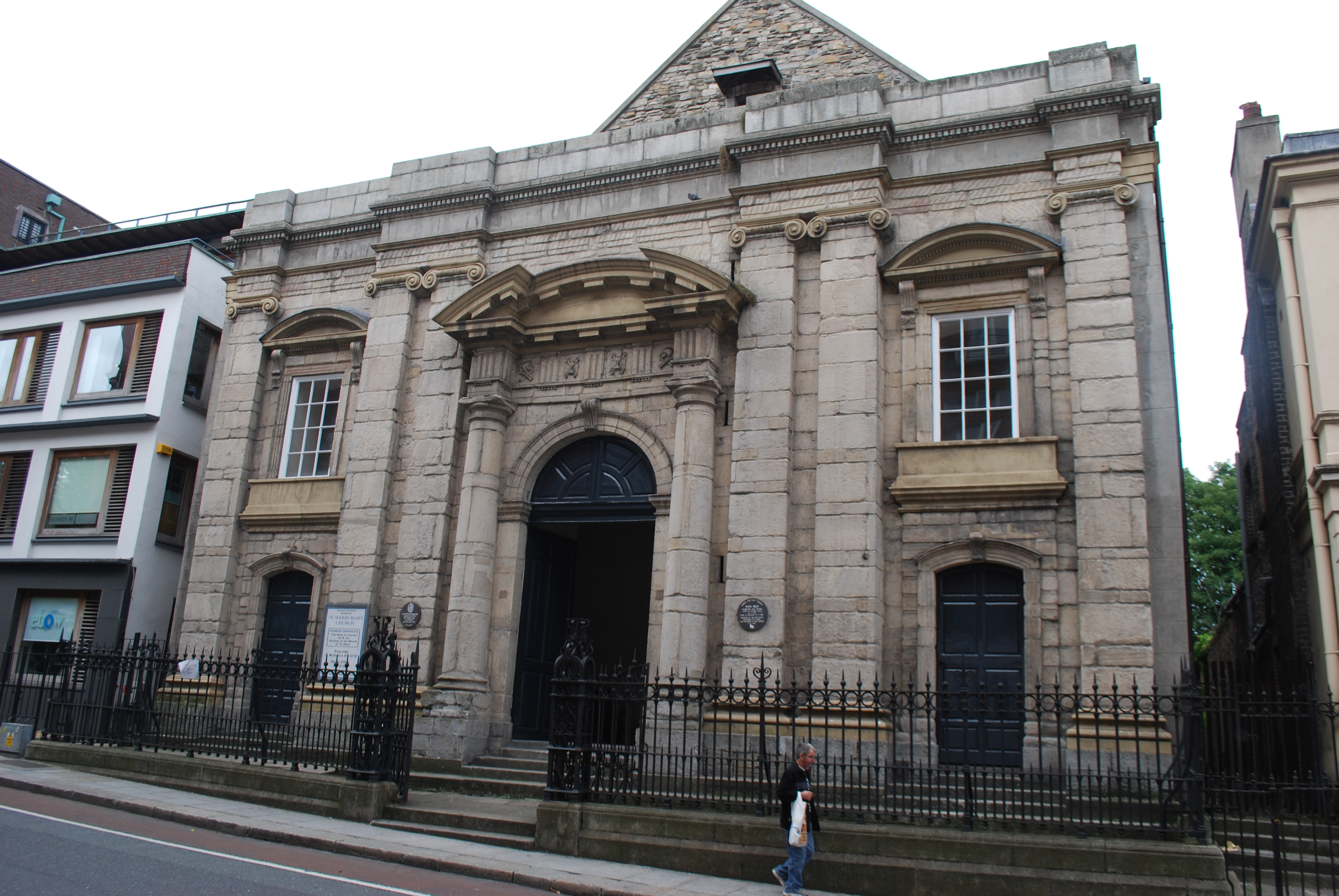
St Werburgh's Church

== Sources ==
- Ball, F. Elrington The Judges in Ireland 1221-1921 London John Murray 1926
- Chancery Inquisitions Post Mortem
- Kenny, Colum King's Inns and the Kingdom of Ireland Dublin Irish Academic Press 1992
- Smyth, Constantine Joseph Chronicle of the Law Officers of Ireland London Butterworths 1839
