= Caesar Litton Falkiner =

Irish Unionist Party politician, barrister and a writer

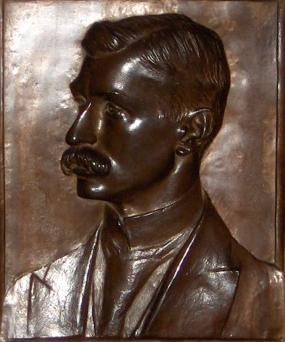
Memorial to Falkiner in St Patrick's Cathedral, Dublin

Caesar Litton Falkiner (26 September 1863 – 5 August 1908) was an Irish Unionist Party politician, barrister and a writer on literary and historical topics.

== Life ==
Falkiner was the second son of Sir Frederick Falkiner, who was subsequently the Recorder of Dublin (1876 –1905.) He studied at the Trinity College Dublin (BA) – where he was the President of the University Philosophical Society (1885–1886) – and at the King's Inns, Dublin (prior to his call to the Bar in 1887.)

He was an unsuccessful candidate in the South Armagh constituency at the 1892 United Kingdom general election.

He appointed Assistant Legal Commissioner in the Irish Land Commission in 1897 and continued in that post until his death. He was also Secretary of the Council of the Royal Irish Academy.

At the time of his death, Falkiner was preparing an edition of the letters of Jonathan Swift, a task which was taken up and completed (6 vols, 1910 – 1914) by F Elrington Ball. It appears that the edition of Thomas Moore's poetry which he was reportedly preparing for the Clarendon Press was never completed. (Godley (1910) seems not to be a continuation of this work.)

He was killed in an accident on 5 August 1908 while on a mountain-climbing holiday in the Alps.

In 1910 a memorial to him was erected in the south aisle of the nave of St. Patrick's Cathedral, Dublin, beside the bust commemorating W.E.H. Lecky. The memorial consists of a bronze bas relief portrait of Falkiner, on a marble ground, with an inscription. At the unveiling of this monument, his contemporary and friend Colonel Edward Macartney-Filgate spoke as follows:

[W]e desire to record not only our affectionate appreciation of his singularly unselfish and loveable character, but also our grateful recognition of his earnest endeavour to teach us to read aright the tangled history of this island. Entirely free from any desire to weave a web wherewith to veil the clouds that overhang the vista of our troubled past, he yet sought to unravel the skein with all the patience of a true craftsman; in the hope that those that come after might learn to avoid the hate and passion, which too often in bygone years confused it in the winding. (Anon (1910) 278–279).

== Family ==
Falkiner had married on 4 August 1892 Henrietta Mary Deane, daughter of Sir Thomas Newenham Deane, with whom he had two daughters.

== Works as author ==
Map of 16th century Ireland from Falkiner, Illustrations of Irish history and topography (London, 1904).

- Falkiner, Caesar Litton (1901). The Phœnix park: its origin and early history, with some notices of its royal and viceregal residences. Dublin: Royal Irish Academy.
- —— (1902). Studies in Irish history and biography : mainly of the eighteenth century. London: Longmans, Green, & Co. ISBN 0-8046-0777-X.
- —— (1902). The Irish guards, 1661–1798. Dublin: Royal Irish Academy.
- —— (1903). The forestry question considered historically, a paper. Dublin.
- —— (1903). The counties of Ireland: an historical sketch of their origin, constitution and gradual delimitation. Dublin: Royal Irish Academy.
- —— (1903). Some illustrations of the commercial history of Dublin in the eighteenth century. Dublin: Royal Irish Academy.
- —— (1904). Illustrations of Irish history and topography, mainly of the seventeenth century. London: Longmans, Green, & Co. ISBN 1-144-76601-X.
- —— (1907). Memoir of John Kells Ingram. Dublin: Sealy, Bryers and Walker.
- —— (1909). F. Elrington Ball (ed.). Essays relating to Ireland: biographical, historical and topographical; with a memoir of the author by Edward Dowden. London: Longmans, Green, & Co. ISBN 0-8046-0777-X.

== Works as editor ==
- Moore, Thomas (1903). Caesar Litton Falkiner (ed.). Poetry of Thomas Moore. London: Macmillan & Co. ISBN 1-57731-133-7.
- Wolfe, Charles (1903). —— (ed.). The poems of Charles Wolfe. London.
- Butler, James (1902). —— (ed.). Calendar of the manuscripts of the Marquess of Ormonde, K. P., preserved at Kilkenny Castle. New series. Vol. 1. London: HMSO. Cd. 929.
- —— (1903). —— (ed.). Calendar of the manuscripts of the Marquess of Ormonde, K. P., preserved at Kilkenny Castle. New series. Vol. 2. London: HMSO. Cd. 1691.
- —— (1904). —— (ed.). Calendar of the manuscripts of the Marquess of Ormonde, K. P., preserved at Kilkenny Castle. New series. Vol. 3. London: HMSO. Cd. 1963.
- —— (1906). —— (ed.). Calendar of the manuscripts of the Marquess of Ormonde, K. P., preserved at Kilkenny Castle. New series. Vol. 4. London: HMSO. Cd. 3008.
- —— (1908). —— (ed.). Calendar of the manuscripts of the Marquess of Ormonde, K. P., preserved at Kilkenny Castle. New series. Vol. 5. London: HMSO. Cd. 4116.
- —— (1911). ——; F. Elrington Ball (eds.). Calendar of the manuscripts of the Marquess of Ormonde, K. P., preserved at Kilkenny Castle. New series. Vol. 6. London: HMSO. Cd. 5288.
