= Patrick Fitzgerald (Irish judge) =

Irish judge

Patrick Fitzgerald (died after 1600) was an Irish judge who held the office of Recorder of Dublin.

Elrington Ball states that he belonged to a junior branch of the leading Anglo-Irish FitzGerald family whose head was the Earl of Kildare. He was said to be "a man learned in the law" and a devout member of the Church of Ireland.

He was appointed Recorder of Dublin in about 1599. For several years previously he had acted as an extra judge of the Court of Common Pleas (Ireland), due to the failing health and mental incapacity of Sir William Bathe, one of the permanent judges of the Common Pleas. He replaced Bathe as a permanent judge of the Common Pleas in 1600, but was superseded soon afterwards in favour of the veteran English barrister Peter Palmer. He had already stepped down as Recorder in favour of Sir Edward Loftus. His precise date of death is not recorded.
