= Fitzwilliam Square =

Georgian square in Dublin, Ireland

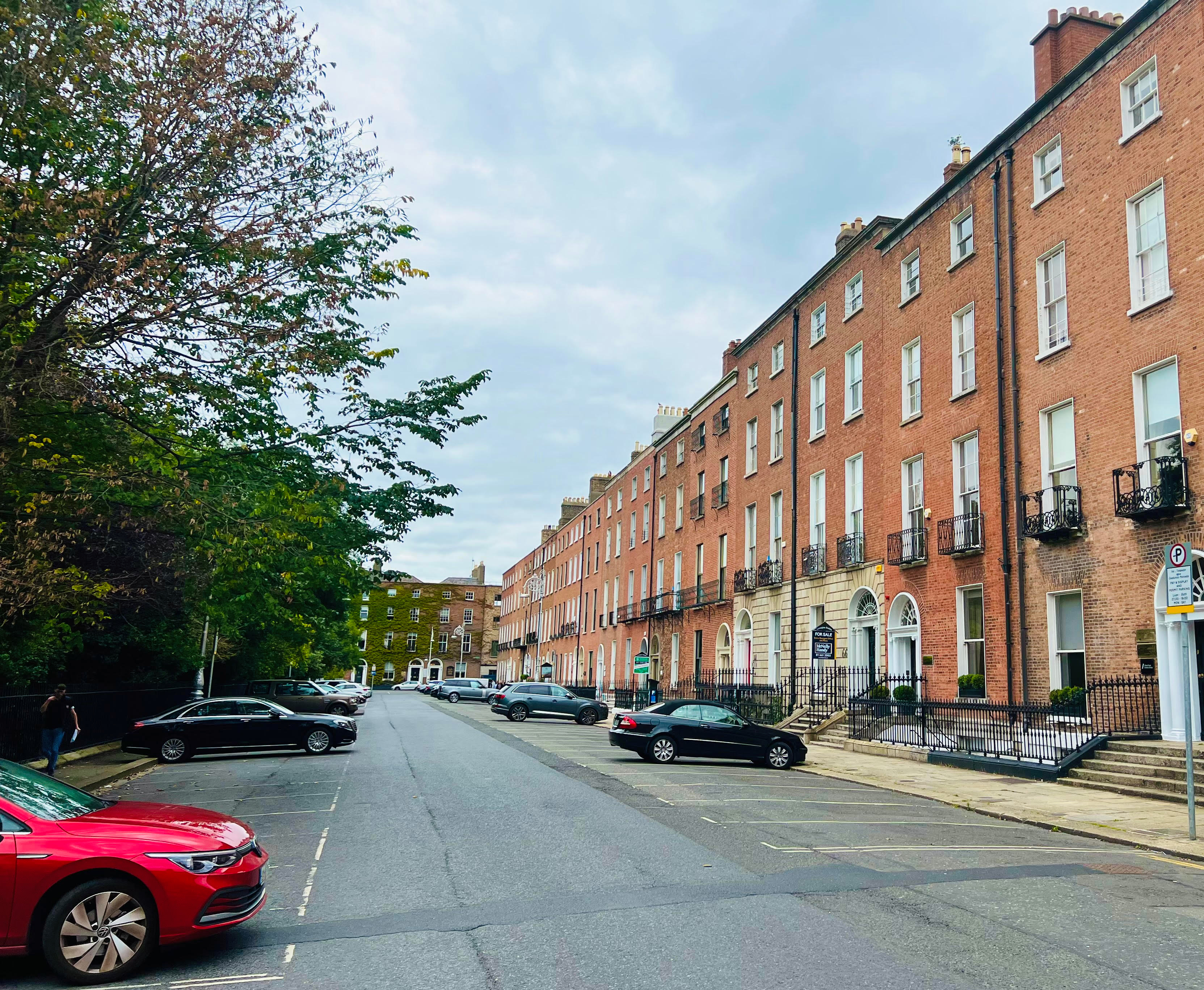
- Georgian townhouses on Fitzwilliam Square

- Location within Central Dublin
- Native name: Cearnóg Mhic Liam (Irish)
- Namesake: Richard FitzWilliam, 7th Viscount FitzWilliam
- Area: 1.5 hectares (3.7 acres)
- Location: Dublin, Ireland
- Postal code: D02
- Coordinates: 53.3354°N 6.2520°W

Fitzwilliam Square (Irish: Cearnóg Mhic Liam) is a Georgian garden square in the south of central Dublin, Ireland. It was the last of the five Georgian squares in Dublin to be built, and is the smallest.

The middle of the square is composed of a private park, which for more than 200 years has been accessible only to keyholders, mostly the residents and owners of the 69 houses on the square, some of whom pay almost €1,000 a year for the privilege. Fitzwilliam Square East makes up part of Dublin's Georgian mile.

== History ==
The square was developed by Richard FitzWilliam, 7th Viscount FitzWilliam, hence the name. It was designed from 1789 and laid out in 1792, on land belonging to the Pembroke estate, which encompassed much of the area to the south-east of the city. It was completed by 1830, with progress slowed by the Acts of Union, which led to a downturn in Dublin's prosperity due to an exodus of many wealthier residents to London.

Fitzwilliam Square, Dublin, Improvement Act 1813
- Act of Parliament
- Parliament of the United Kingdom
- Long title: An Act for inclosing, lighting and improving Fitzwilliam Square, in the County of the City of Dublin.
- Citation: 53 Geo. 3. c. clxxxv

Dates
- Royal assent: 2 July 1813

Text of statute as originally enacted

The centre of the square was enclosed in 1813 through an act of Parliament, the Fitzwilliam Square, Dublin, Improvement Act 1813 (53 Geo. 3. c. clxxxv). To the north is the much larger Merrion Square, with which Richard FitzWilliam was also involved. The square was a popular place for the Irish Social Season of aristocrats entertaining in Dublin between January and Saint Patrick's Day each year.

Shootings took place in the square during Bloody Sunday of 1920. As independence from the United Kingdom arrived and during a broader period of renaming prominent streets in the city, a proposal was considered in 1921 to rename the square after Oliver Plunkett. However, the residents, who included members of the peerage and officers of the British Army, objected to the change.

In 1975, Bord na Móna were granted permission to demolish five early 19th-century houses on the edge of the square, with plans to construct a modern office block on the site. The plans were later dropped.

== Notable people ==
Former or current residents of the square have included:

- William Dargan (1799–1867), railway designer, lived at number 2
- Mainie Jellett (1897–1944), artist, lived at number 36
- Sir Thomas O'Shaughnessy (1850–1933), the last Recorder of Dublin, who also died there on 7 March 1933
- Robert Lloyd Praeger (1865–1953), Irish naturalist and author lived at number 19
- Jack Butler Yeats (1871–1957), painter, lived and had his studio at number 18 from 1930 onwards

== See also ==
- List of streets and squares in Dublin
