= Georgian mile =

District in Dublin, Ireland

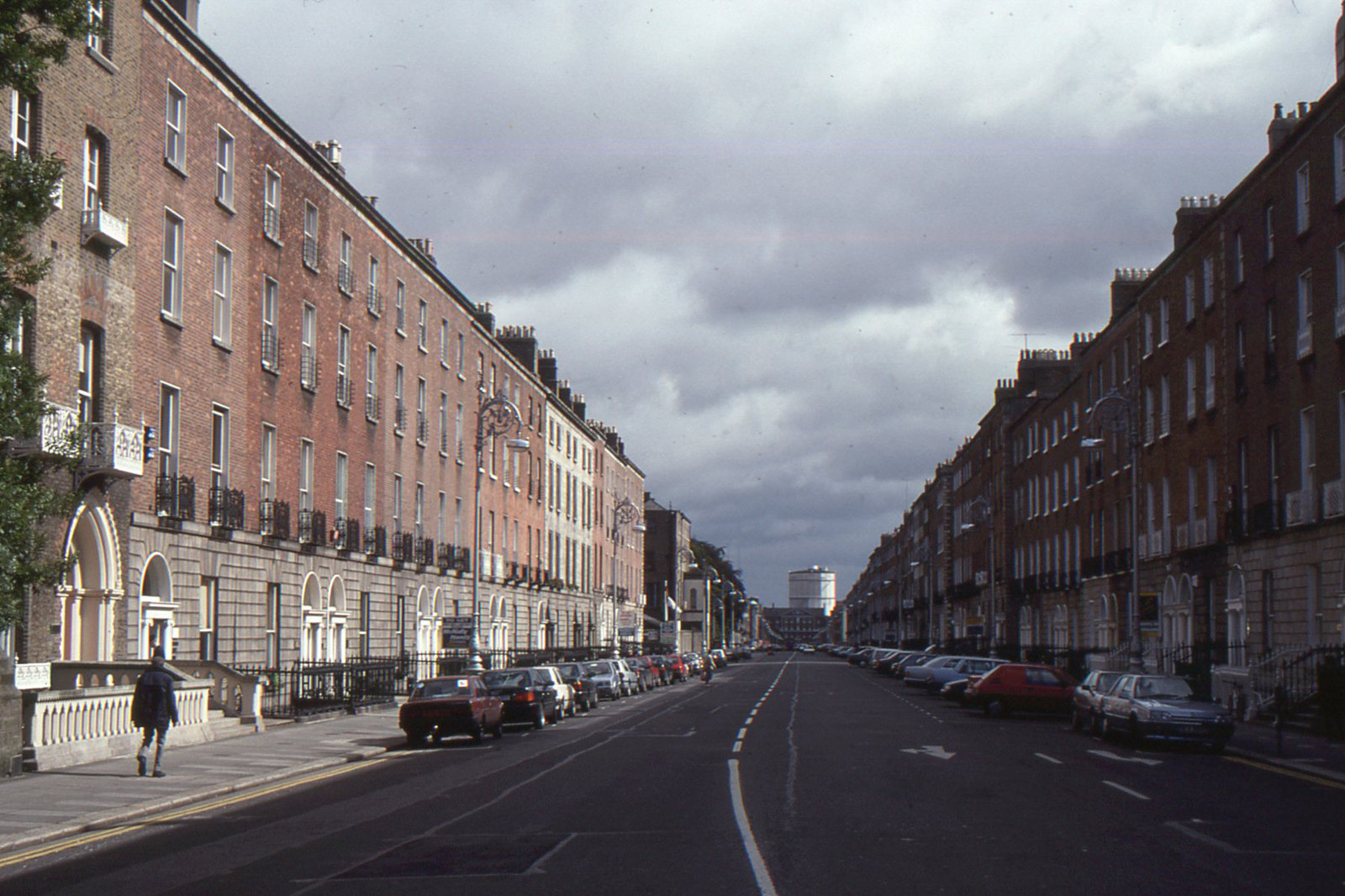
- A view down the length of the Georgian mile in 1993. The terminating vista is Holles Street Hospital. The gas cylinder behind it was demolished in the mid-'90s

- Location within Central Dublin
- 53.3371439°N 6.2488052°W
- Location: Dublin, Ireland

The Georgian mile is an unofficial term used to describe a continuous, near mile-long thoroughfare largely lined with Georgian townhouses in Dublin, Ireland. It comprises Fitzwilliam Place, Fitzwilliam Square East, Fitzwilliam Street, and Merrion Square East, and was built between the 1780s and the 1830s.

According to The Irish Times, the stretch was once "the longest and arguably the finest Georgian streetscape in the world." A Dublin Tourism brochure claimed that it was the "longest complete Georgian thoroughfare in Europe until the 1960s, when a row of houses was replace by a modern office block."

== 1965 demolition of 16 houses ==
In 1962, Ireland's Electricity Supply Board announced plans to level 16 houses on the Lower Fitzwilliam Street portion of the mile in order to build a new headquarters and to accommodate its growing presence on the street. The move resulted in widespread pushback from the city's conservationists and would become a bone of contention between preservationists and the ESB for 50 years. Those in opposition to the demolition included the Irish Georgian Society, actor Micheál MacLiammóir and artist Seán Keating. Princess Grace of Monaco also lent her support for the preservation of the houses.

In spite of this, the demolition went ahead in 1965. The firm Stephenson Gibney & Associates was hired to design a new ESB building that would occupy the entire site. It was completed in 1978. The modernist building that resulted was largely unliked in the city and was subsequently called “a brutish intrusion on a polite classical assembly”. It is reported that Arthur Gibney and Sam Stephenson regretted their design in later years.

== 2013 plan to redevelop the site ==
In 2013, the ESB unveiled plans to redevelop the 1978 building. The new headquarters opened in 2022 and was designed by Grafton Architects. It was described as a “chameleon-like scheme” that is “hiding in plain view among the Georgian brick façades” by the Architects’ Journal.

== Gallery ==
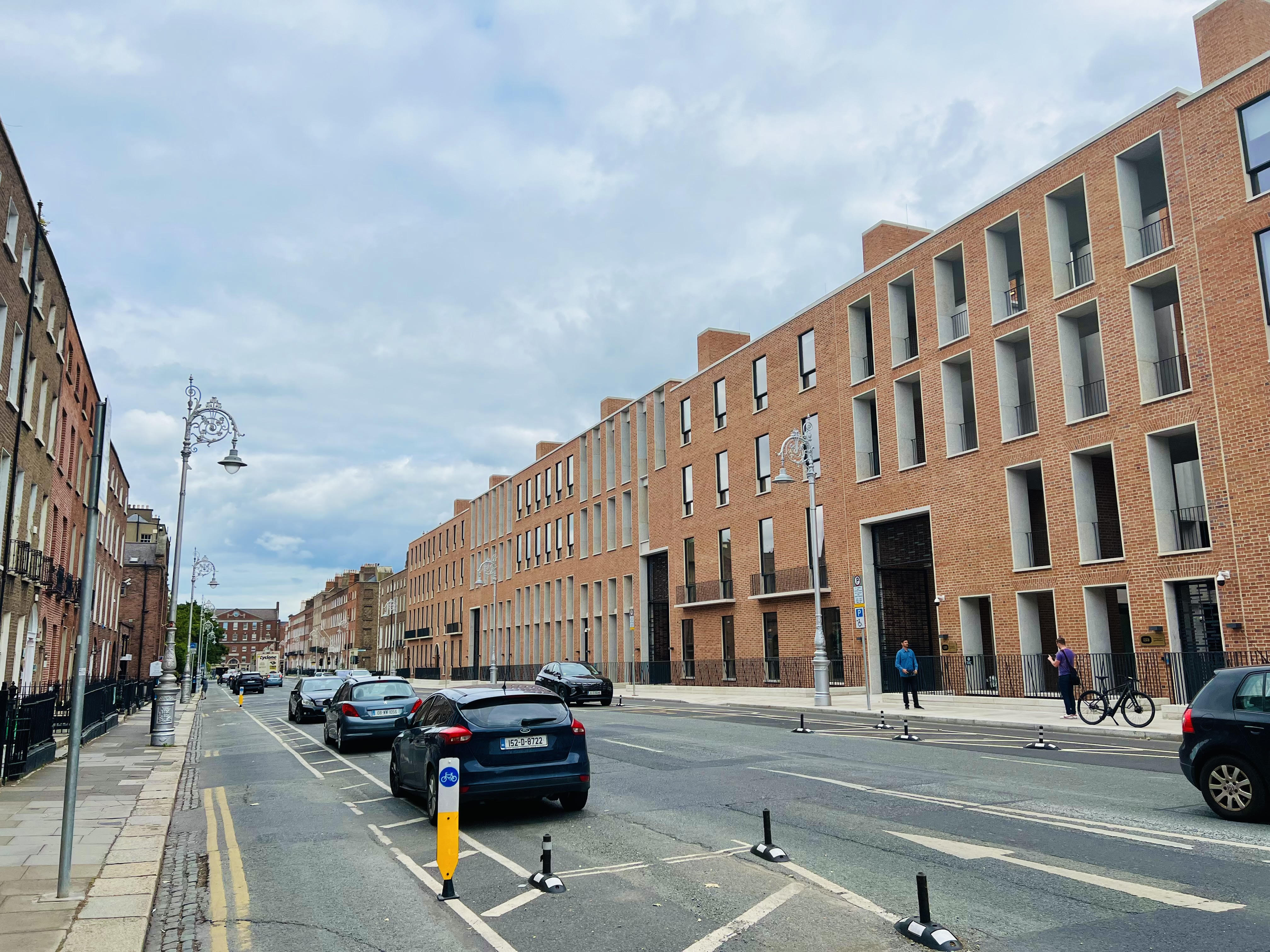
The 2022 redevelopment by Grafton Architects

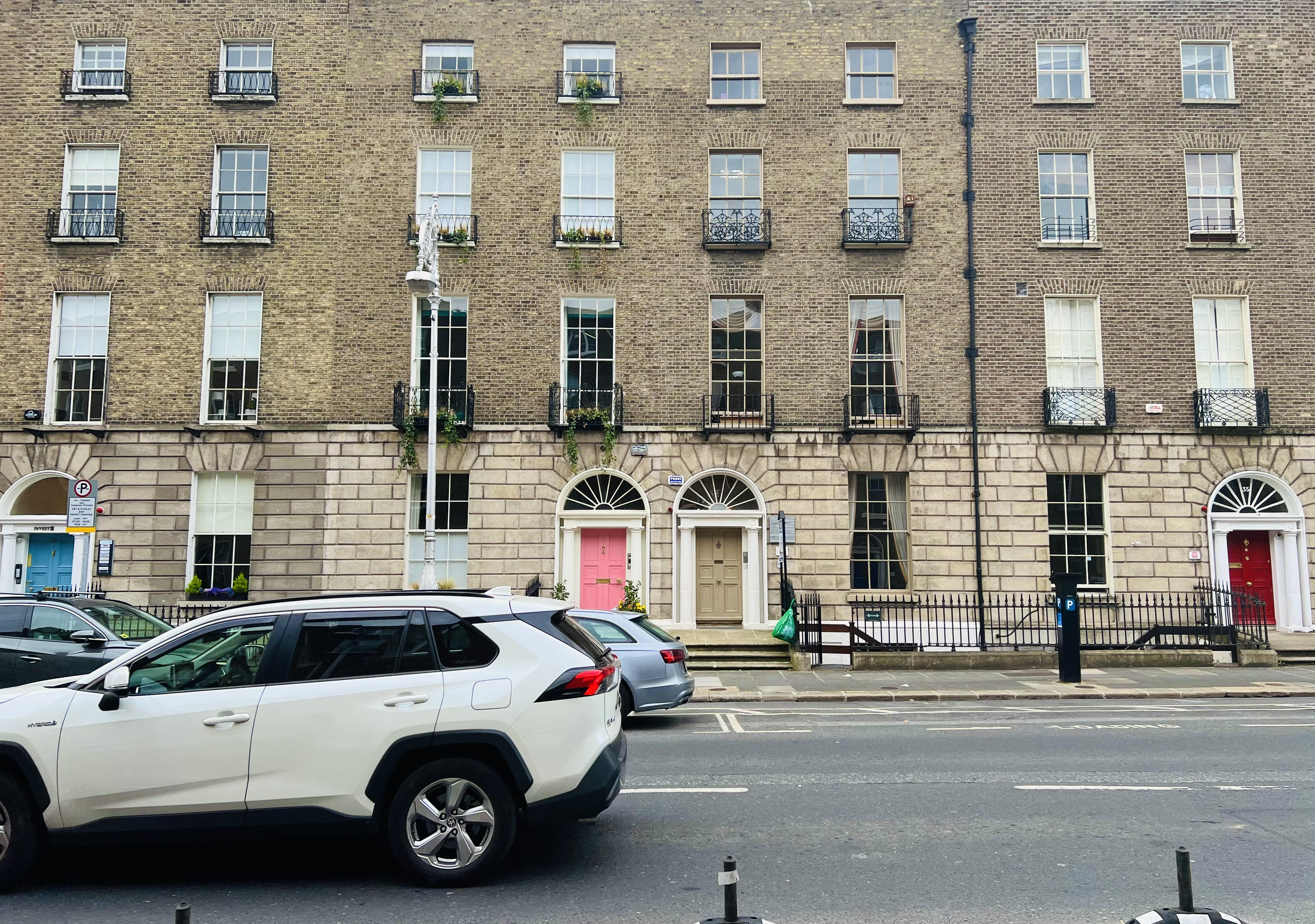
Townhouses along the mile

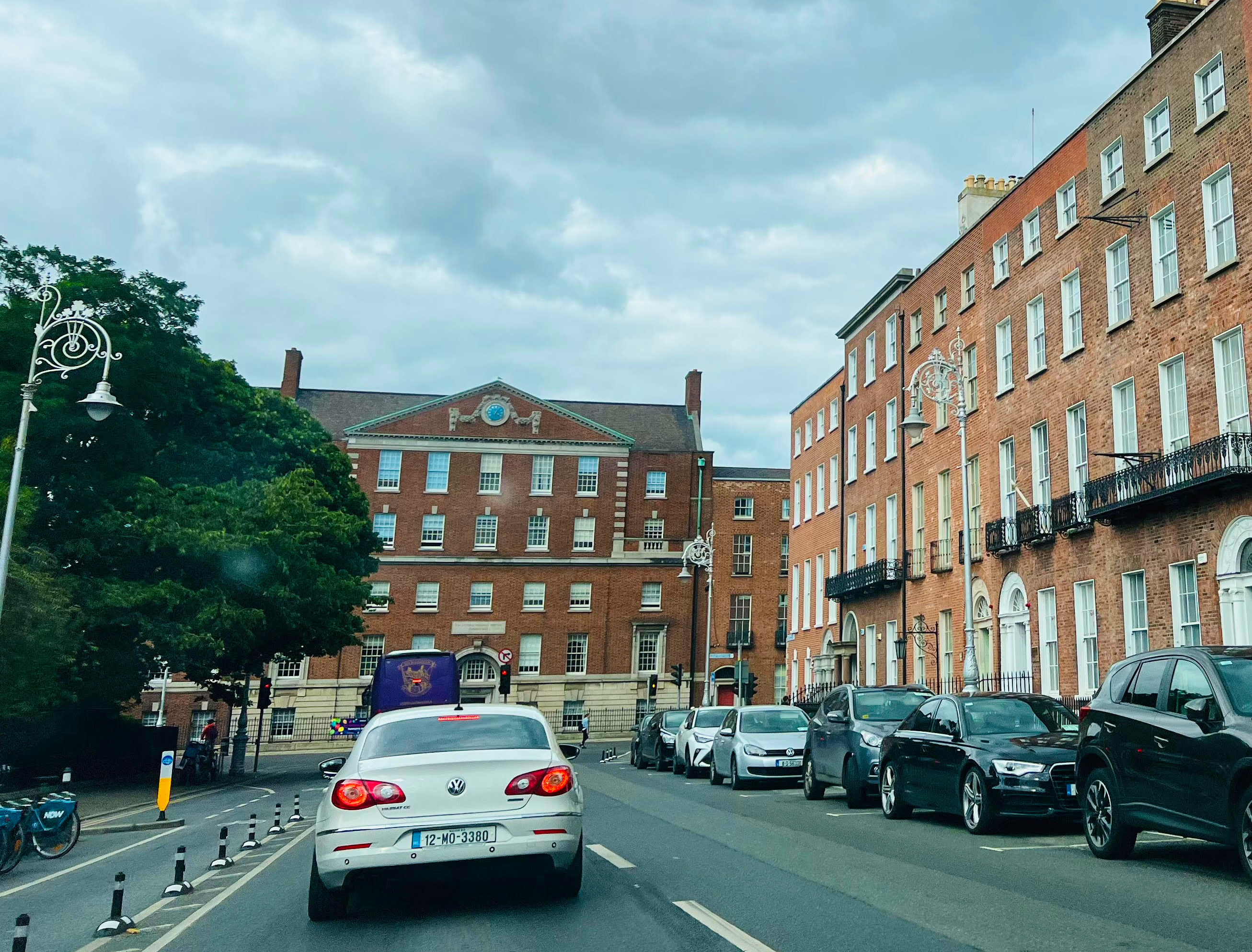
Holles Street Hospital sits at the northeastern end of the mile

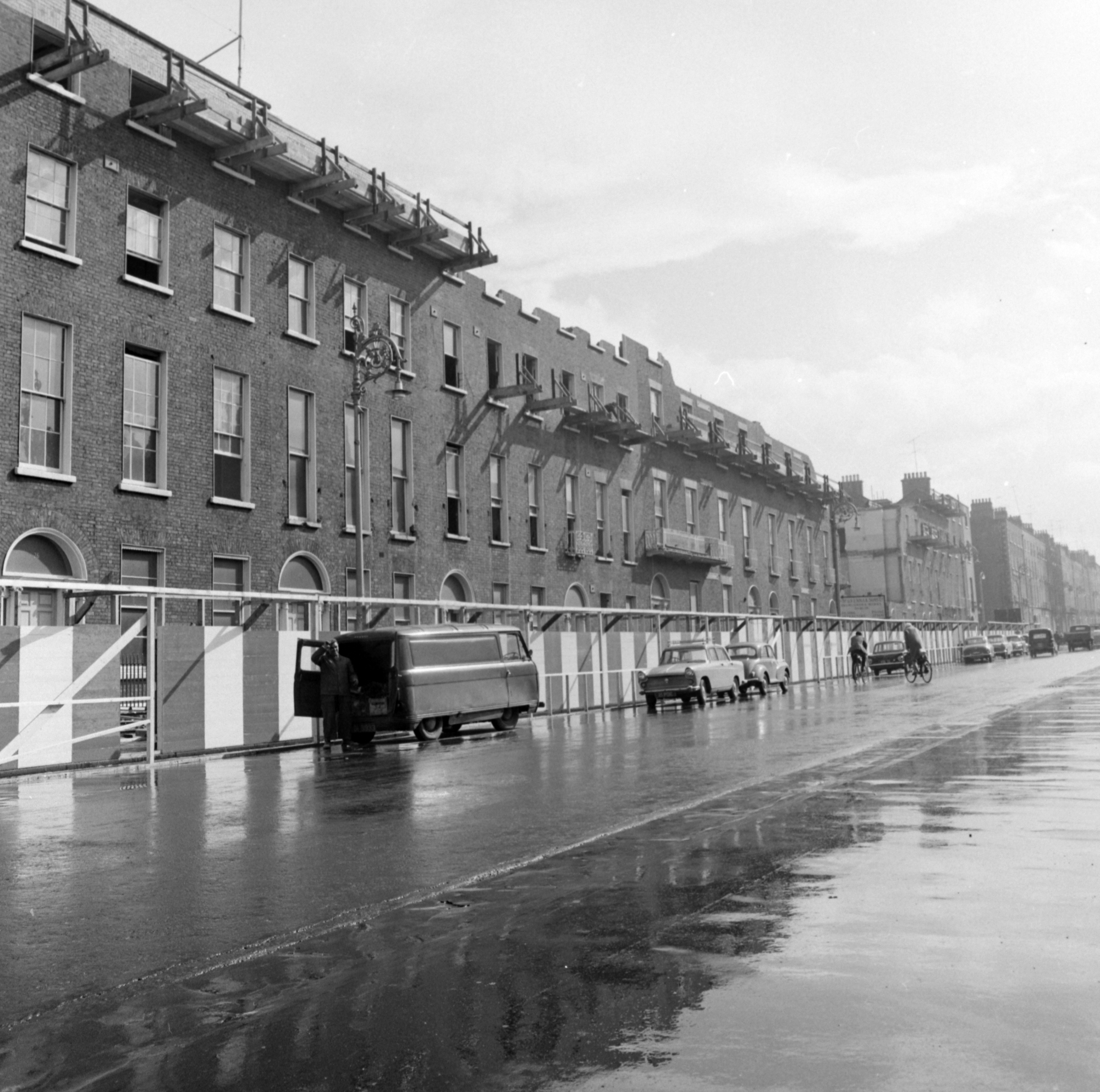
Houses along Fitzwilliam Street being demolished in 1965

== See also ==
- Georgian Dublin
- Georgian architecture
