= Frederick Falkiner (judge) =

Irish lawyer, judge and author

Sir Frederick Richard Falkiner PC QC (1831 – 23 March 1908) was an Irish lawyer, judge and author.

== Life ==
Falkiner was the third son of Richard Falkiner, of Mount Falcon, County Tipperary, Ireland, and was educated at Trinity College Dublin, from which he graduated in 1852, the same year that he was called to the Irish Bar. He became a Queen's Counsel in 1867 and was appointed as Law Adviser to the Lord Lieutenant of Ireland in 1875.

The following year he was appointed Recorder of Dublin, a judicial position he held for almost three decades. He became a bencher of King's Inns in 1880 and was knighted in 1896.

Falkiner held briefs in many important cases. In 1876 he was appointed recorder of Dublin, on the death of Sir Frederick Shaw, and earned a reputation for humanity. During his early years as recorder, he was called upon to decide intricate points in the licensing laws; Maurice Healy remarked that he was reluctant to add to Dublin's licensed premises. He took an interest in the subject of workmen's compensation, and when Joseph Chamberlain was engaged in drafting the Workmen's Compensation Act 1897 he adopted several of Falkiner's suggestions. He retired from his office on 22 Jan 1905, when he was made a privy councillor. Falkiner was one of the most prominent members of the general synod of the Church of Ireland, and in the debates of that body, especially on financial questions, he frequently intervened with much effect. He was chancellor to the bishops of Tuam, Clogher, Kilmore, Derry and Raphoe. He was also chairman of the board of King's Hospital, better known as the Blue Coat School. In 1906, he published a history of this school, which is in effect a history of Dublin from the Restoration to the Victorian era. Falkiner pursued literary interests; he wrote on Jonathan Swift's portraits (Swift's Prose Works, 1908, vol. xii.), and a collection of his 'Literary Miscellanies' was published posthumously in 1909.

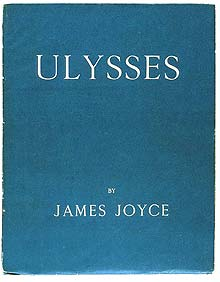
Joyce's Ulysses

Falkiner was notoriously anti-Jewish in his judgements, which was most visible, when he was a judge in a case against Henry Kahn (Jewish grandfather of Irish actress Dervla Kirwan) in 1902. While this caused public outrage, he ultimately retained his position. In his capacity as Recorder of Dublin (as of 16 June 1904) he is both mentioned and directly appears in James Joyce's Ulysses — in Chapter 8 (Lestrygonians), Chapter 12 (Cyclops) and Chapter 15 (Circe). In a hallucination, he sentences Leopold Bloom to the same punishment as Kahn - Mountjoy Prison.

Following his retirement as Recorder of Dublin in June 1905, he was made a member of the Irish Privy Council. He was also a governor of the King's Hospital school in Dublin.

He died in retirement at Funchal, Madeira, on 23 March 1908.

== Family ==
He married twice: (1) in 1861 Adelaide Matilda (died 1877), third daughter of Thomas Sadleir of Ballinderry Park, county Tipperary; and (2) Robina Hall (died 1895), third daughter of N. B. M'Intire of Cloverhill, county Dublin. By his first wife, he had three sons and four daughters. His second son, Caesar Litton Falkiner (1863–1908), was a distinguished lawyer and scholar.

== Works ==
- Falkiner, Frederick Richard (1906). The foundation of the Hospital and Free school of King Charles II., Oxmantown Dublin: commonly called the Blue coat school: with notices of some of its governors, and of contemporary events in Dublin from the foundation, 1668 to 1840, when its government by the city ceased. Dublin: Sealy, Bryers and Walker.
- Falkiner, Frederick Richard Essay on the portraits of Swift in Vol xii, Swift, Jonathan (1908). Temple Scott (ed.). The prose works of Jonathan Swift, D.D. London: G. Bell & Sons.
- Falkiner, Frederick Richard (1909). Falkiner, Mary Mildred (ed.). Literary miscellanies [of] Sir F.R. Falkiner, collected by his daughter May. Dublin: Hodges, Figgis & Co.
- "Our habitual criminals" . Journal of the Statistical and Social Inquiry Society of Ireland. VIII (Part LX). Dublin: Statistical and Social Inquiry Society of Ireland: 317–30. 1882. ISSN 0081-4776.

== Notes ==
Attribution

- This article incorporates text from a publication now in the public domain: Murray, Robert Henry (1912). "Falkiner, Frederick Richard". In Lee, Sidney (ed.). Dictionary of National Biography (2nd supplement). London: Smith, Elder & Co.
