= James Stanihurst =

Irish politician

James Stanihurst (died 1573), also spelt James Stanyhurst) was for three terms Speaker of the Irish House of Commons. He was also the first judge to hold the position of Recorder of Dublin.

== Life ==
He was the son of Nicholas Stanihurst, Mayor of Dublin from 1542 to 1543. He was Speaker of the Irish House of Commons in the Parliaments of 1557, 1560, and 1568. At the opening of each session, he delivered an oration. He proved himself a supporter of Protestantism under Elizabeth I of England, and contrived the passing through the Commons of the Act of Uniformity passed in England the year before, in 1560, putting the question when its chief opponents were absent from the chamber. On the other hand, his friendship with Edmund Campion suggests that like many of the Anglo-Irish gentry he retained a certain sympathy with the Roman Catholic faith.

In 1570 he recommended to Parliament, in a speech which he delivered at the prorogation, a system of national education for Ireland, proposing the establishment of grammar schools throughout the country. At the same time, he suggested the formation of a university in Dublin such as was inaugurated by the foundation of Trinity College Dublin a few years later. The speech is said to have been printed. Stanyhurst's educational policy was not accepted by the government, although Sir Henry Sidney, to whom he was close, strongly supported it. Edmund Campion, who acted as tutor to his son Richard, was also a good friend, and acknowledged assistance from Stanihurst in writing his history of Ireland. On one occasion Stanihurst, despite outwardly professing the Protestant faith, saved Campion from arrest on the charge of being a Jesuit by sending him to the home of the Barnewall family of Turvey House, who were staunch Catholics.

He died in Dublin on 27 December 1573, aged 51. A Latin elegy by his son Richard was printed in the latter's description of Ireland, as well as in the appendix to his translation of Virgil.

== Family ==
He married Anne Fitzsimon, daughter of Thomas Fitzsimon, Recorder of Dublin, and had five children. Richard Stanihurst was their eldest son, and they left another son, Walter, who translated into English Innocent, de Contemptu Mundi. His daughter Margaret married Arland Ussher, one of the six clerks of the Court of Chancery (Ireland), and was mother of James Ussher, Archbishop of Armagh, and Ambrose Ussher.

Political offices
Preceded by Thomas Cusack	Speaker of the Irish House of Commons; 1557, 1560 and 1568	Succeeded by Nicholas Walsh
