= Recorder of Dublin =

Former judicial office in Dublin, Ireland

The Recorder of Dublin was a judicial office holder in pre-Independence Ireland.

== Functions and duties of the Recorder ==
The Recorder was the chief magistrate for Dublin, and heard a wide range of civil and criminal cases. The office existed by the late fifteenth century. From information given during a debate on the duties of the Recorder in the English House of Commons in 1831, it seems that he sat twice a week, with extra sessions as and when the workload required. Unlike his counterpart the Recorder of Cork, he never seems to have had a Deputy. His chief responsibility was to keep the peace, and he also controlled the number of pubs in the city. The duties were so onerous – by the 1830s the Recorder was hearing roughly 2,000 cases a year – that some Recorders sought promotion to the High Court bench in the belief that the workload there would be lighter. The Recorder also acted on occasion as a mediator in conflicts between the central government and Dublin Corporation.

Although he held a full-time judicial office, the Recorder, unlike the High Court judges, was not debarred from sitting in the Irish House of Commons, and despite their heavy workload, several Recorders served as MPs while sitting on the Bench. After the Act of Union 1800 the Recorder was eligible to sit in the English House of Commons, although an objection was made to this in 1832, on the grounds that a judge should not sit in Parliament and a minority of MPs supported making the Recordership incompatible with a seat in the Commons. Nonetheless, Sir Frederick Shaw, the Recorder in question, continued in his dual role for many years, until he stepped down as MP in 1848. There was apparently no objection to his combining the office of Recorder with that of a Law Officer: Sir Richard Ryves, Recorder of Dublin 1680–1685, was a King's Serjeant for part of the same period.

The Recorder was not a Crown appointee: he was elected by the Corporation of Dublin, although he could be dismissed by the Crown. There is an interesting account of the election of Dudley Hussey in 1784, when he defeated three rival candidates for office. He was only one of two officials of Dublin Corporation who were elected, the other being the Clerk of the Tholsel.

== History of the Office ==
Thomas Cusack is named as Recorder of Dublin in 1488. He had clearly held the office in the previous year, when like all the Irish judiciary, he had supported the attempt by the pretender Lambert Simnel to claim the English Crown, and following Simnel's crushing defeat was now required to do penance for his treason and swear fealty to the Tudor dynasty. His disgrace was short-lived: Sir Richard Edgcumbe, who administered the oath of fealty to him, dined with him "with great cheer".

There is then a gap on the records until the sixteenth century, when the office of Recorder was held by Thomas Fitzsimon in 1547, and by his son-in-law James Stanihurst, Speaker of the Irish House of Commons, in 1564. The last Recorder was Sir Thomas O'Shaughnessy. The Recordership was abolished in 1924 and the Recorder's functions transferred to the new Circuit Court.

== List of holders of the office of Recorder of Dublin 1487–1924 (incomplete) ==
Holders of the position have included:

- 1487/8 Thomas Cusack
- 1547 Thomas Fitzsimon
- 1564 James Stanihurst (d. 1573)
- 1573 Henry Burnell
- 1599 Patrick Fitzgerald
- 1601 Sir Edward Loftus (killed at the Battle of Kinsale)
- c. 1603 Sir William Talbot, 1st Baronet, removed shortly afterwards as a Roman Catholic
- 1604–1613 Richard Bolton
- 1620s–1626 James Barry, 1st Baron Barry of Santry
- 1626-1634 Nathaniel Catelyn
- 1634-1660 John Bysse
- 1661–1672 Sir William Davys, later Lord Chief Justice of Ireland.
- 1672 Elisha Leighton
- 1680-1685 Sir Richard Ryves
- 1685-1687 Colonel Garrett Dillon
- 1687 Sir John Barnewall
- 1690–1693 Thomas Coote
- 1693-1695 Nehemiah Donnellan
- 1695–1701 Sir William Handcock
- 1701–1714 John Forster
- 1733–1750 Eaton Stannard
- 1751-1756 Thomas Morgan
- 1756–1766 James Grattan (father of Henry Grattan)
- 1766–1784 Samuel Bradstreet
- 1784–1785 Dudley Hussey
- 1785–1794 Denis George, later Baron of the Court of Exchequer (Ireland)
- 1794–1820 William Walker Elected 30 May 1794 Died 31 December 1820
- 1822–1828 Sir Jonas Greene
- 1828–1876 Sir Frederick Shaw
- 1876–1905 Sir Frederick Falkiner (1831–1908)
- 1905–1924 Sir Thomas O'Shaughnessy (1850–1933), the last Recorder of Dublin

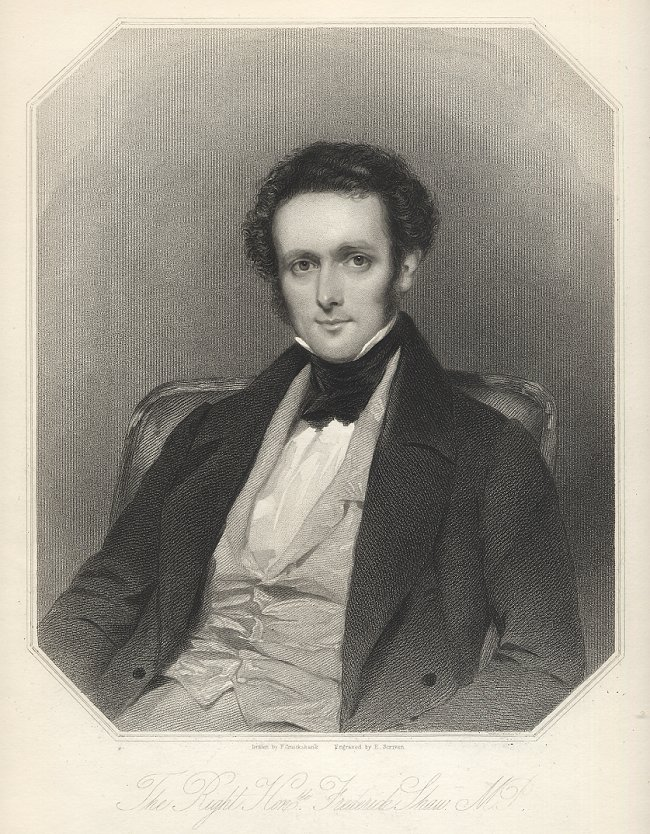
Sir Frederick Shaw, Recorder of Dublin 1828-1876

== Sources ==
- This article incorporates text from a publication now in the public domain: "Stanyhurst, Richard". Dictionary of National Biography. London: Smith, Elder & Co. 1885–1900.
