= Trinity Homes, Brixton =

Coordinates: 51.460824°N 0.118115°W

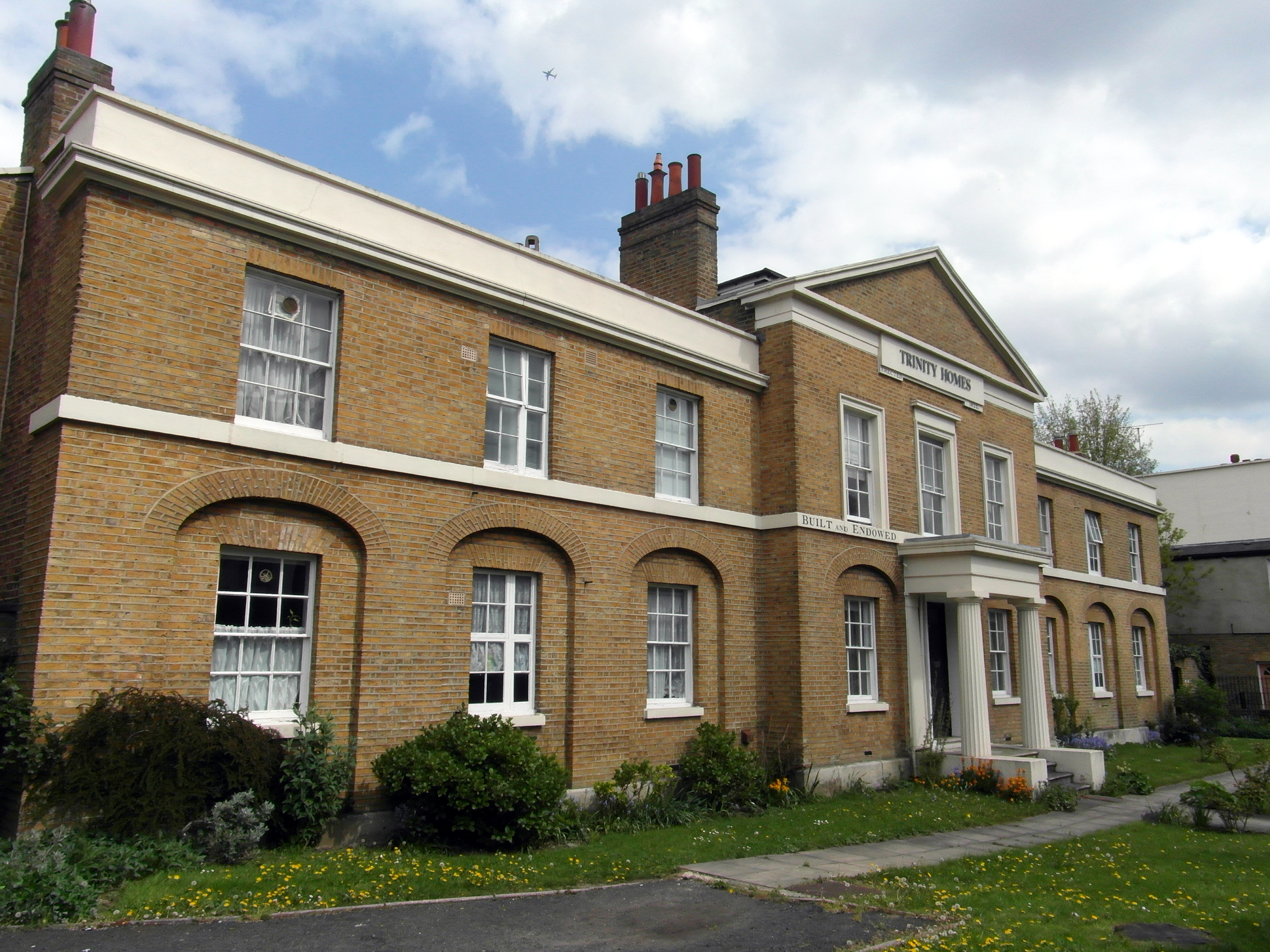
Trinity Homes, Brixton, in 2013

Trinity Homes, also known as Bailey's Almhouses, are almshouses in Acre Lane, Brixton, London SW2.

They were built in 1822, with an additional building (numbers 17–20) constructed in 1860, and are Grade II listed.

Trinity Homes Almshouses are provided for the benefit of men and women over the age of 57 who are members of a Christian denomination. They may also be provided to married couples.
