= Williams' Hospital =

Former almshouse in Hereford

Coordinates: 52.0528°N 2.7065°W

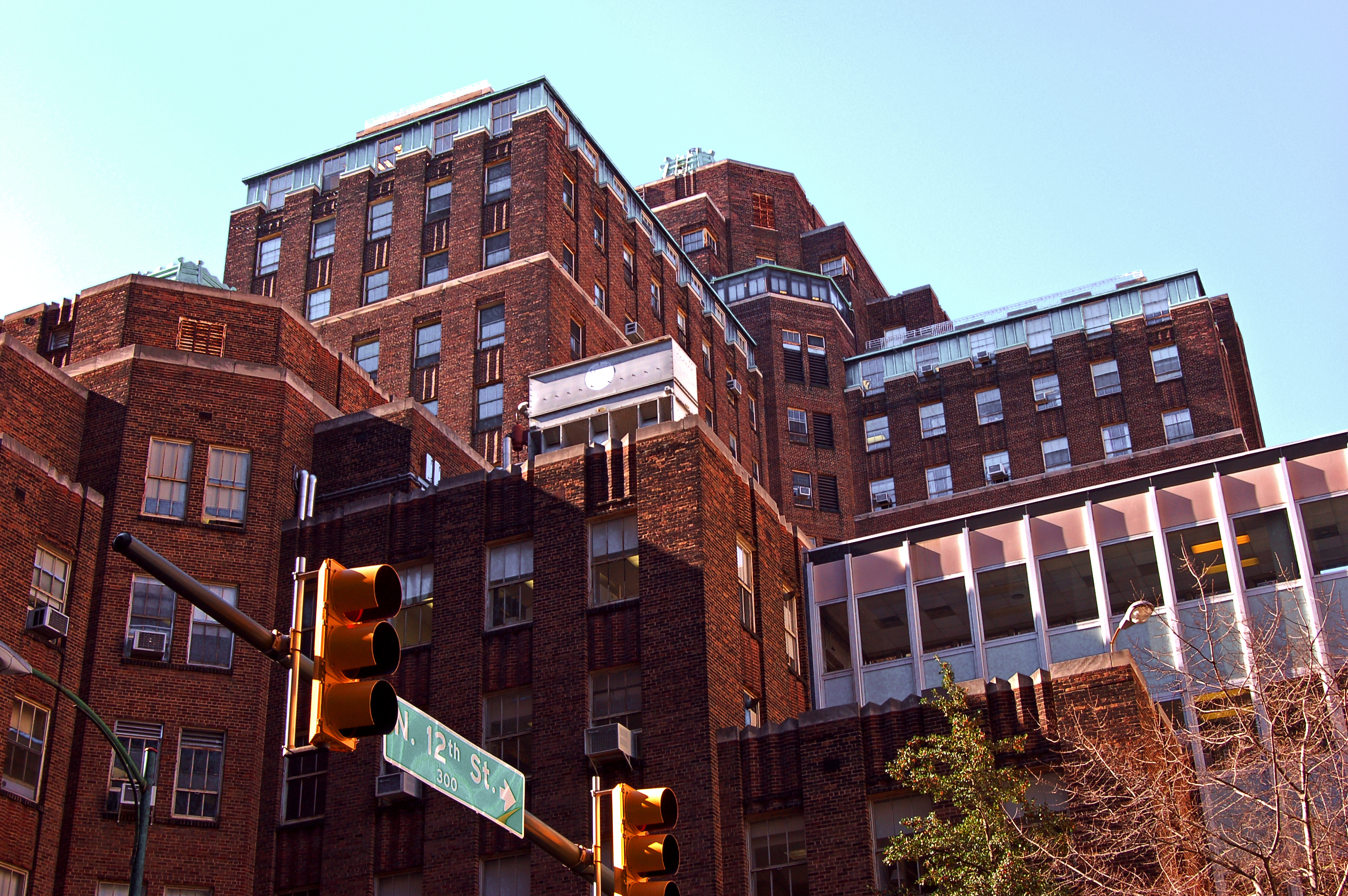

The Williams' Hospital was an almshouse in the English town of Hereford. The hospital was founded in 1601 by Richard Williams who was an attendant of Lord Cobhans and it provided housing for six elderly men.
