= John Haverfield =

English gardener and landscape architect (1744–1820)

John Haverfield (1744–1820) was an English gardener and landscape architect.

== Early life ==
He was born at Haverfield House on Kew Green, the son of John Haverfield Sr (1694–1784) and Ann Drew. His father, a surveyor at Twickenham, was Head Gardener at Kew to Augusta, Dowager Princess of Wales, and superintendent of the Royal Gardens at Richmond Lodge. Haverfield was trained as a gardener and from 1762 was his father's assistant.

== Career ==
When his father died in 1784 John took over his father's position at Kew Gardens, but only for a few years, by which time he had developed his own landscape gardening business. In July 1794 the Kew kitchen garden was closed and John resigned. In September he was placed on a Bounty List with a £250pa pension.

In 1769 he met Augusta's nephew, Ernest II, Duke of Saxe-Gotha-Altenburg, who was the same age, who took him to Gotha. There, near the castle, he laid out a garden based on the ideas of Lancelot Capability Brown, which is one of the first English landscape gardens on the continent. In 1790 John designed the landscape for Chiselhampton House.

He was also involved in other garden projects and played a key role in the construction of Walsingham Abbey Park, Walsingham, from 1804 to 1816. John remodelled the gardens at Pitzhanger Manor for Sir John Soane, creating a curving 'serpentine' lane, a rustic bridge, and a plantation. He also worked on Tyringham House in Buckinghamshire which Soane had designed. Haverfield also visited other Soane schemes: Hinton Saint George (1796), Bentley Priory (1798), Ramsey Abbey (1804), Moggerhanger House (1809 & 1810).

In 1783 Haverfield and Robert Tunstall (c 1759–1833), his brother-in-law, applied and obtained an Act of Parliament to rebuild Kew Bridge in stone to replace the wooden bridge.

== Personal life ==
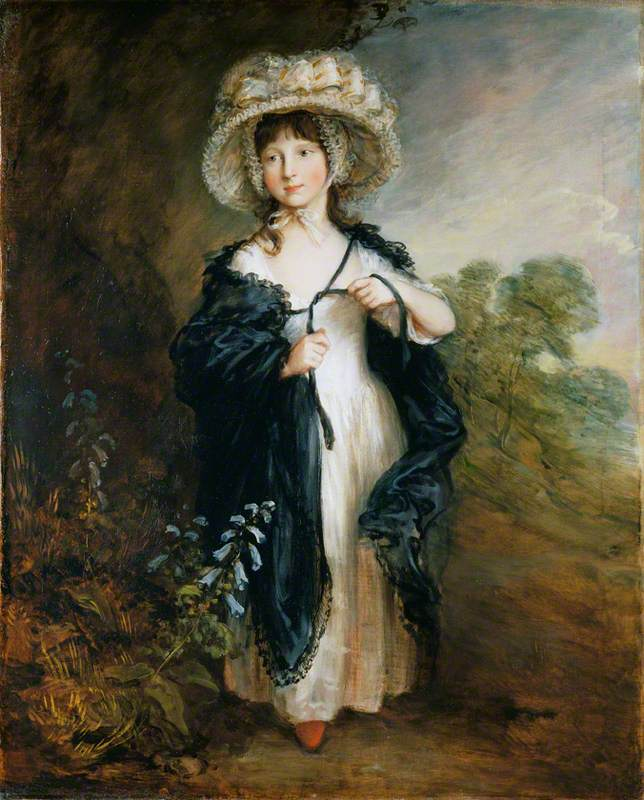
Miss Elizabeth Haverfield

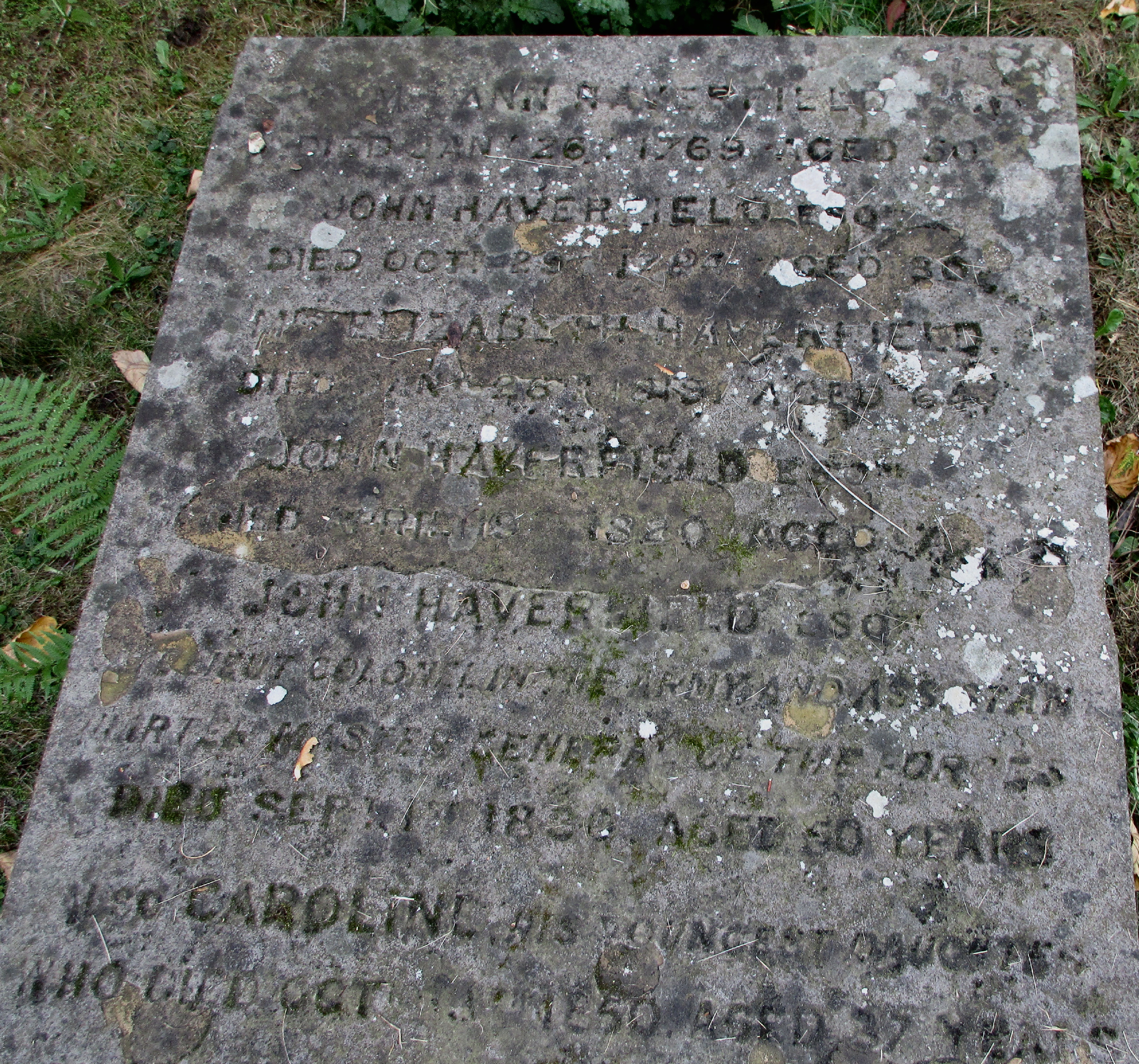
Tomb, St Anne's Church, Kew

On 4 June 1773 he married Elizabeth Tunstall (1756–1819), daughter of Robert Tunstall (d 1762) at St Anne's Church, Kew. The Tunstall family came from Brentford and had operated a horse-ferry since 1659. Her father had built the first wooden Kew Bridge in 1758–1759. Their children were

- Elizabeth Ann Haverfield (1776–1817). Her portrait was painted by Thomas Gainsborough, when she was aged about eight or nine years old; it is now in The Wallace Collection. She married the Rev James Wyld on 8 November 1794.
- John Haverfield (1780–1830) who became a Justice of the Peace, Lieutenant Colonel and Quarter Master General. His first marriage in 1805 was to Susannah Slade. His second marriage in 1815 at Kew was to Isabella Frances Meyer, the daughter of Jeremiah Meyer, a miniature painter who also lived on Kew Green. He is buried at St Anne's, Kew.
- Mary Isabella Haverfield (1782–1852)
- Robert Tunstall Haverfield (1783–1839) a captain in the Royal Navy.
- Rev Thomas Tunstall Haverfield (1787–1866), who was curate at St Anne's Church, Kew (1812–1818), Chaplain to Queen Charlotte (d. 1818), and Rector of Goddington. He is buried at St Anne's, Kew.

Haverfield retired in 1795. He died in April 1820 and was buried at St Anne's Church, Kew, on 25 April 1820, in the family tomb. In his will he left the "freehold capital messuage or mansion house with buildings and appurtenances thereto situate in Ham Street in the County of Surrey together with seven acres of freehold pasture land and two acres and half of customary pasture [ground?] belonging to the manor of Petersham" to his wife.

== Works ==
- Gotha Palace Park (from 1769)
- Stradsett Hall
- Walpole Park, Pitshanger Manor, Ealing
- Abbey Park, Walsingham
- Tyringham Hall (1795, 1799)
