= Abraham Blackborne =

English Anglican vicar

The Revd Abraham Blackborne was a vicar in Dagenham, who died at age 82 in 1797, having served for 58 years. Blackborne also served a parish in Middlesex, where he and his wife Frances (née Fanshawe) had the use of an estate in St. Martin-in-the-Fields, according to their deed of 1791.

Blackborne was the grandson of Sir Richard Levett, Lord Mayor of London and was married to Frances Fanshawe of Parsloes Manor in Dagenham. Blackborne and his wife are buried at Saint Anne's Church, Kew.

== Background ==
At the time of the Restoration, the entire manor of Cockermouth, to which the church was appended, was owned by Sir Thomas Darcy. Subsequently the manor was sold to the Blackborne family, and ultimately the heirs of William Blackborne Esq., High Sheriff of Essex, sold to the Bonynges after Blackborne suffered devastating financial losses in the South Sea Bubble.
