= Anthony Saxton =

British businessman (1934–2015)

Anthony Nicholas Scott Saxton
- Born: 23 July 1934; Suffolk
- Died: 31 March 2015 (aged 80)
- Occupations: Headhunter, Chairman of Kingstream
- Spouse: Jill Lauderdale (1971–2015, his death)
- Children: 2

Anthony Nicholas Scott Saxton (23 July 1934 – 31 March 2015) was a British advertising man and, later, headhunter who established the "swinging mega-boutique" Way In on the top floor of Harrods in 1967. In 1979 he and his business partner Stephen Bamfylde set up the headhunting firm Saxton Bampfylde. He was chairman of executive search company Moloney and director of Australian miners Kingstream through which he formed close ties with the regime in North Korea.

Saxton was born in Suffolk and was educated at Harrow School. A devout Anglican, he spent most of his life in Kew in London, where he served as a churchwarden of St Anne's Church. He was also an oblate of Alton Abbey in Hampshire.

Saxton was a close friend of Peter de la Billière.

In 1971 he married Jill Lauderdale, with whom he had two daughters.
