= Kew Cricket Club =

Coordinates: 51.48458°N 0.28846°W

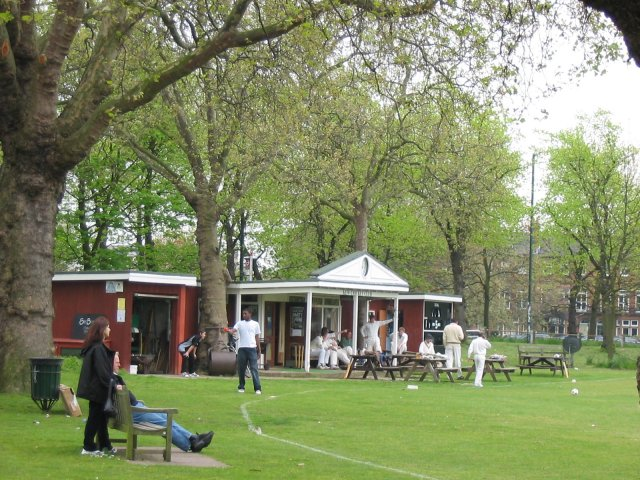
- Kew Cricket Club pavilion

Personnel
- Captain: Shane MacDermott
- Chairman: Peter Berg

Team information
- Established: 1882
- Home venue: Kew Green, Kew Road, London Borough of Richmond-upon-Thames

International cricket
- First international: 1973
- Official website: www.kewcc.com

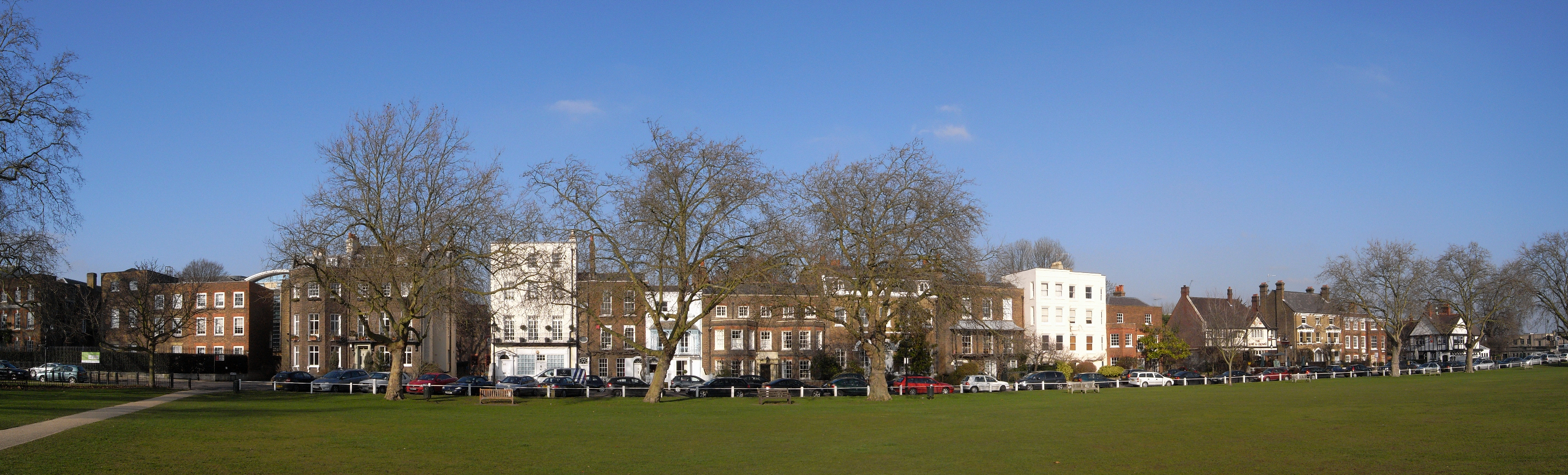
Kew Green, historically in Surrey

Kew Cricket Club (KCC) is a cricket club which hosts matches on Kew Green at Kew, historically in Surrey and now in the London Borough of Richmond-upon-Thames. It was formed in 1882 following the amalgamation of two local clubs, Kew Oxford Cricket Club and Kew Cambridge Cricket Club. Cricket was played on Kew Green for at least 150 years previously.

In August 1732, The Whitehall Evening Post reported that Frederick, Prince of Wales, attended "a great cricket match" at Kew on Thursday 27 July. A report in The London Evening Post dated 16 July 1737 refers to a match between the Prince of Wales' XI and the Duke of Marlborough's XI. A close neighbour of the Prince of Wales when resident at Marlborough House his London town house, the duke was a keen cricketer and a member of Marylebone Cricket Club; his great nephew, the Revd Lord Frederick Beauclerk, became President of Marylebone Cricket Club (MCC) (1826–27).

== Current activities ==
Today, Kew Cricket Club fields four Saturday League teams, a Sunday League team and a Sunday friendly team. Kew Cricket Club operates a thriving Colts section, fielding league teams at the U17 (under 17 years of age), U15, U13 and U11 levels. Kew CC 1st XI currently plays in Division 1 of the Thames Valley Cricket League. Kew CC's 1st and 2nd XI teams play at Kew Cricket Club Ground on Kew Green, whilst the 3rd and 4th XIs play nearby on St Mary's University cricket ground at Teddington.

A charity cricket match takes place annually on May bank holiday.

== History ==
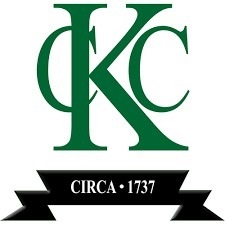

Historically in the county of Surrey and owned by the Crown Estate, Kew CC's ground is adjacent to the Royal Botanic Gardens.

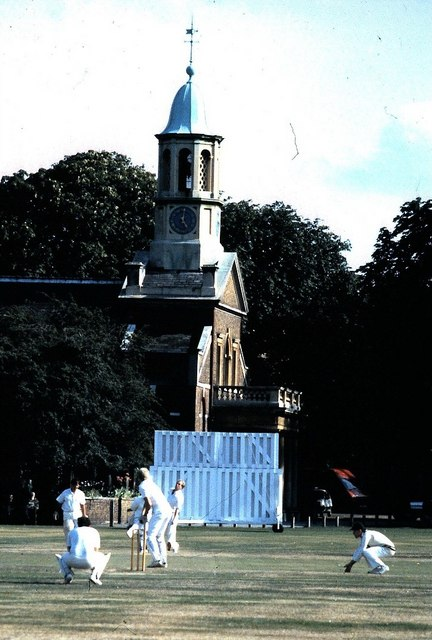
St Anne's Church provides a picturesque backdrop to cricket on Kew Green

- 1732 – Frederick, Prince of Wales, attended "a great cricket match" at Kew on Thursday 27 July
- 1737 – The first recorded cricket match on Kew Green was between the Prince of Wales' XI and the Duke of Marlborough's XI
- 1824 – Kew Green was enclosed by Act of Parliament, the Land at Kew Green, Surrey Act 1823 (4 Geo. 4. c. 75)
- 1853 – The Windsor and Eton Express reported that a meeting had been held at the Rose & Crown pub to re-establish the Kew Cambridge Cricket Club
- 1855 – Bell's Life in London and Sporting Chronicle referred to "Kew Cambridge Cricket Ground" as the venue for a match between the Goodenough House School CC and Clifden House CC which took place on 16 May
- 1868 – The Windsor and Eton Express reported that despite being said to have included four professional players, a Kew United Cricket Club team had lost a match at Kew Green on 9 July against the Slough & Upton Cricket Club
- 1876 – Kew Cambridge Cricket Club was granted permission to cordon off the wicket
- 1881 – Kew Cambridge Cricket Club and Kew Oxford Cricket Club amalgamated to form Kew Cricket Club
- 1962 – Kew CC was given permission to erect a pavilion
- 1964 – The cricket pavilion was opened
- 1966 – Sunday cricket was allowed on Kew Green for the first time
- 1973 – Jamaica played New Zealand on Kew Cricket Club's pitch in the 1973 Women's Cricket World Cup; however, the match was abandoned due to rain.

== See also ==
- Kew Gardens
