= John Haverfield Sr =

English gardener and landscape architect (1694–1784)

John Haverfield Sr (1694–1784) was an English gardener and landscape architect.

== Career ==
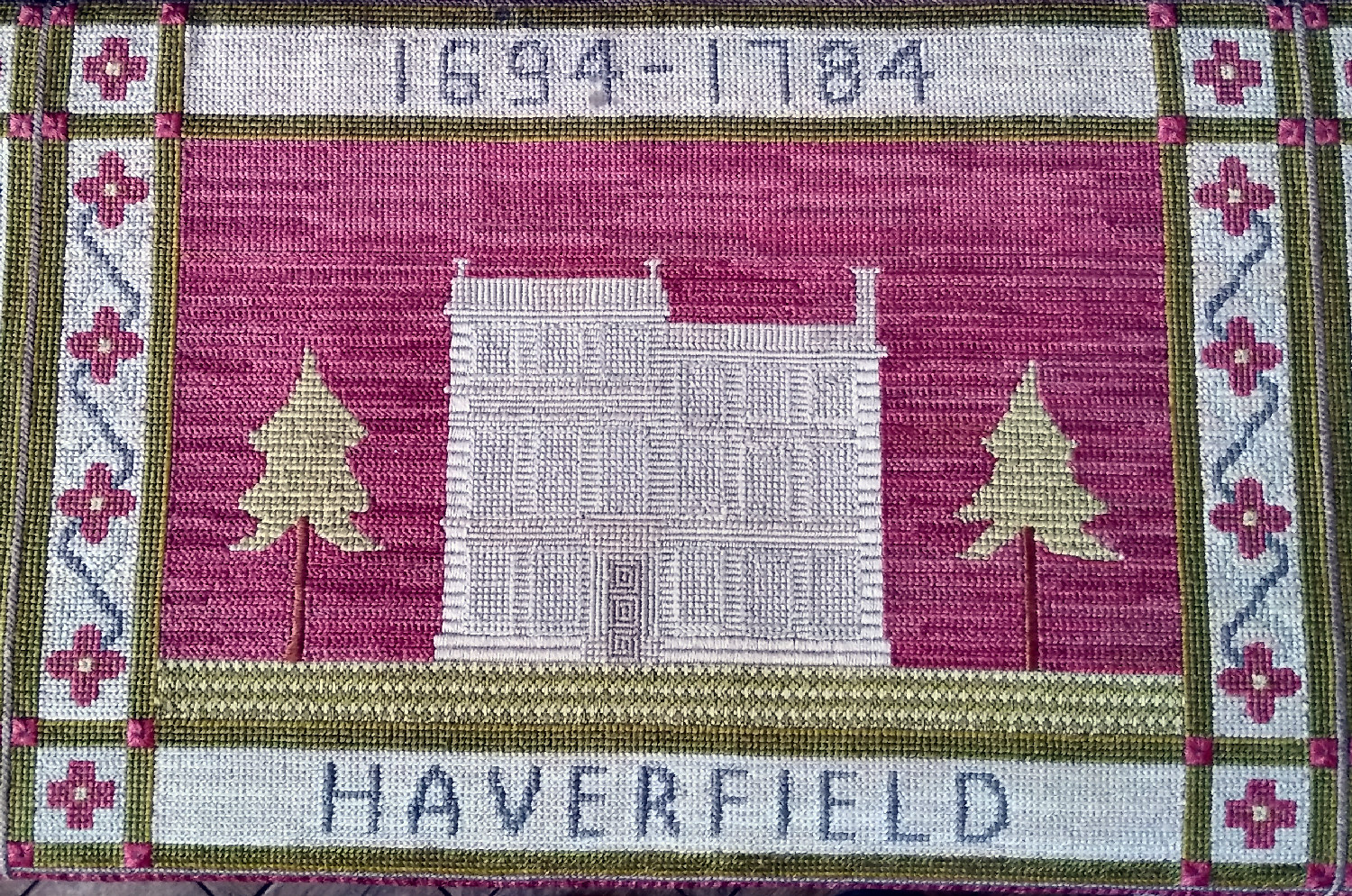
Haverfield's kneeler at St Anne's Church, Kew

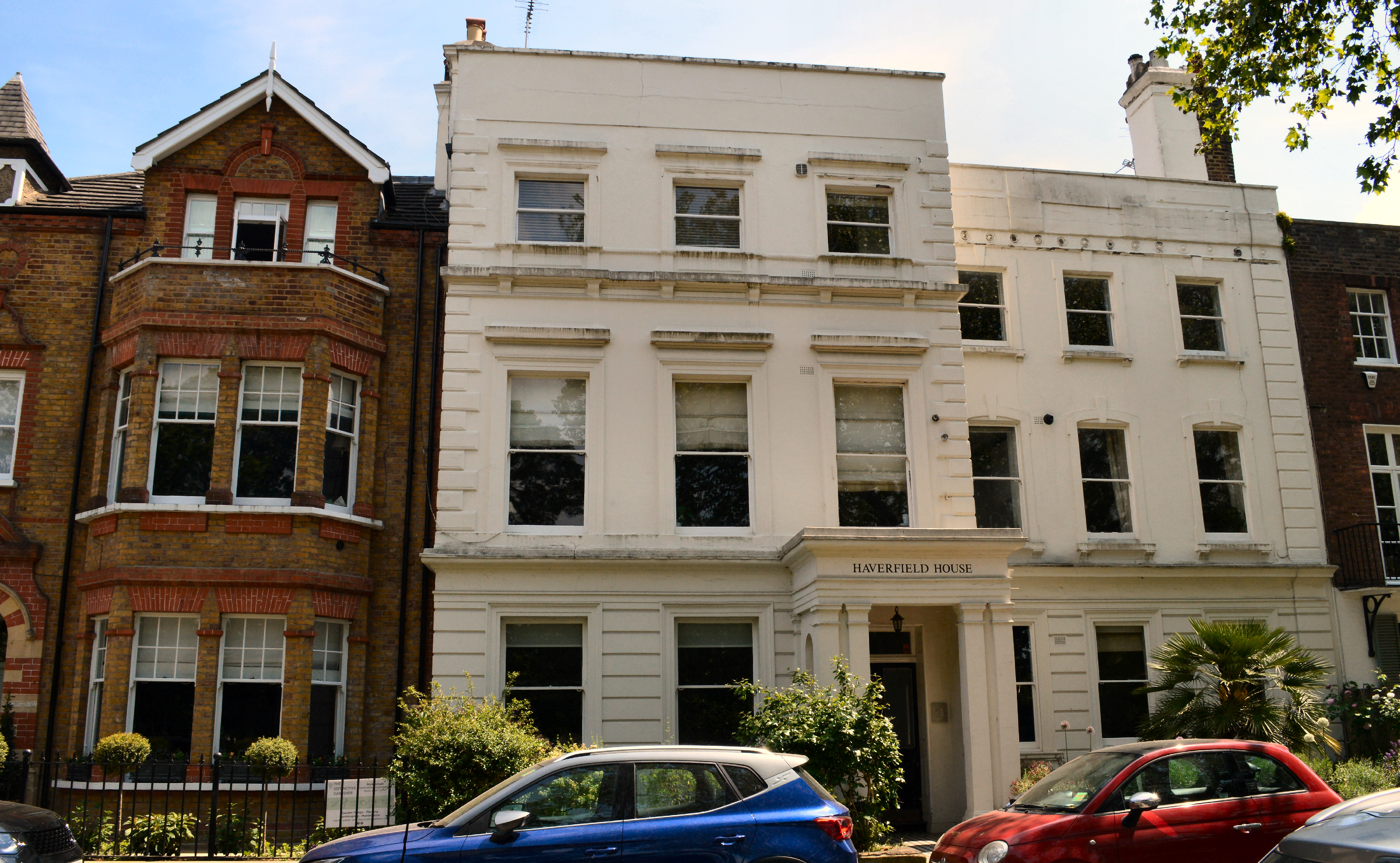
Haverfield House, Kew Green

John Haverfield was a surveyor at Twickenham; he later moved to Kew Green where he had a house built c. 1750, which was known as Haverfield House.

Lord Bute recommended John Haverfield to Princess Augusta in 1759 to succeed Robert Greening at Kew. At that time there were two royal gardens at Kew, Richmond Gardens to the west and the grounds of Kew House to the east, which had been reconstructed by Capability Brown. John Haverfield was Head Gardener at Kew to Augusta, Dowager Princess of Wales, and superintendent of the Royal Gardens at Richmond Lodge. In October 1759 he was recorded "ordering and cultivating Her Royal Highness's garden at Kew". On the death of George II in 1760, Haverfield was in charge of Richmond Gardens and William Aiton of Kew Gardens. In 1762 his son, John, joined to assist his father. In 1763 he was paid £700pa "for cultivating and keeping in order our Pleasure Grounds and Orangery, Kitchen Garden and Melon Ground at Kew". In 1768 he recorded a "barge load of Tann" for the Exotic Garden. This was "tanner's bark" made of crushed oak bark used in leather tanning. The spent bark produced a gentle heat during fermentation used to cultivate exotic plants. His salary in 1769 was £200.

On 1 January 1783 William Aiton was appointed chief gardener when the Haverfields resigned, although they continued to be responsible for the Richmond Gardens. On Havefield's death in 1784 his son John followed him for a couple of years in the management of Richmond Garden before concentrating on his own business. Aiton then succeeded to the management of both gardens, so combining the two main gardens.

== Personal life ==
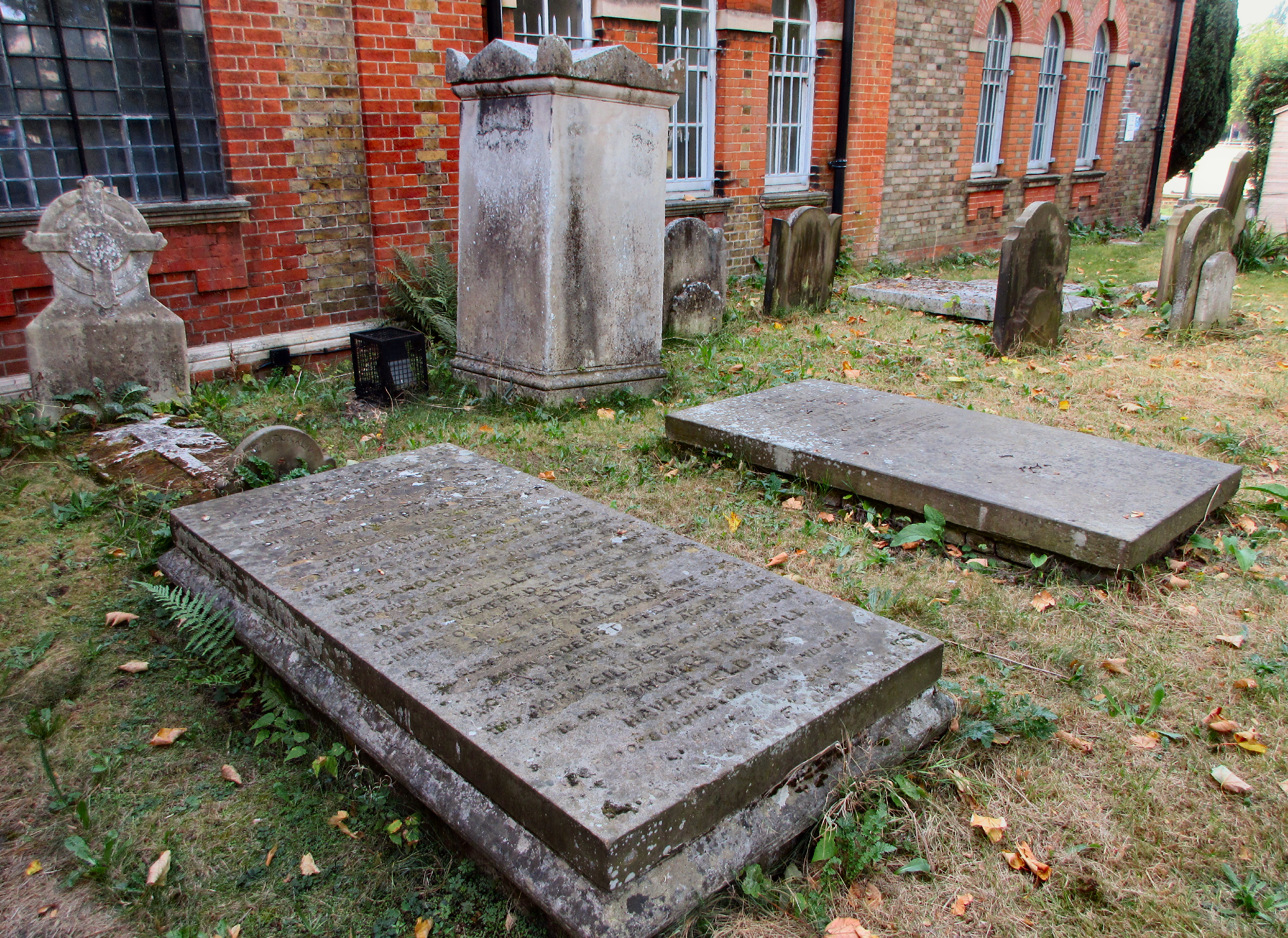
Tomb, St Anne's Church, Kew

He married Ann Drew (1717–1769) in 1742.

Their surviving children were:

- John Haverfield (1744–1820) who was a landscape architect.
- Thomas Haverfield (1748–1804) was superintendent of the Hampton Court Palace Gardens from 1783 where he was responsible for the Great Vine. He married Isabella Pigott on 8 July 1773 at St Vedast, London with a second ceremony on the 13 July at St Anne's Church where he was later buried.
- Rev William Haverfield (1749–1822)

The three sons of John Sr were members of Kew Masonic Lodge. Johan Zoffany painted "The three brothers Haverfield" (John, Thomas and William).

John Haverfield died aged 90 on 25 October 1784 at Kew, Surrey, and was buried on the 29th at St Anne's Church, Kew, in the family tomb. There is a pew cushion for him in St Anne's Church, Kew, which depicts Haverfield House. Haverfield Gardens, Kew, is built on the orchard that once belonged to the Haverfield estate.
