= St Anne's Church, Kew =

- The Parish Church of St Anne, Kew
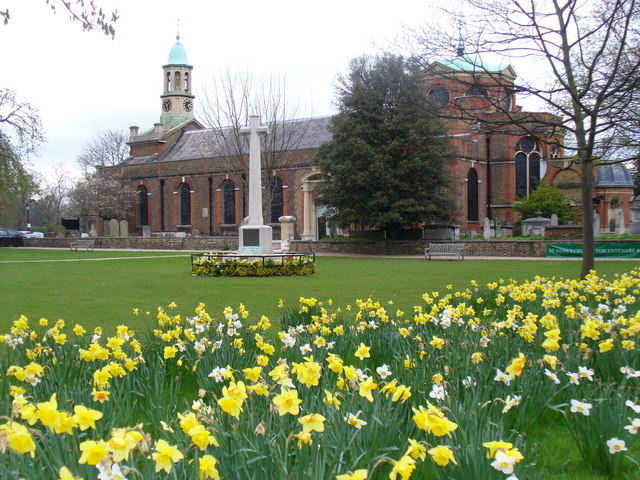
- St Anne's and Kew War Memorial in spring
- St Anne's Church, Kew
- 51.4838°N 0.2879°W
- OS grid reference: TQ 18982 77484
- Location: Kew Green, Kew, Richmond TW9 3AA
- Country: England
- Denomination: Church of England
- Website: saintanne-kew.org.uk/kew-green

History
- Founded: 1714
- Founder: Queen Anne
- Dedication: 12 May 1714

Architecture
- Years built: 18/19/20c

Administration
- Diocese: Southwark
- Archdeaconry: Wandsworth
- Deanery: Richmond & Barnes
- Parish: St Anne, Kew

Clergy
- Bishop: Rt Revd Christopher Chessun
- Vicar: Revd Canon Dr Giles Fraser

Listed Building – Grade II*
- Official name: Parish Church of St Anne
- Designated: 10 January 1950
- Reference no.: 1194022

Arms of Queen Anne

St Anne's Church, Kew is a parish church located in the London Borough of Richmond upon Thames (historically in Surrey), adjacent to the Royal Botanic Gardens, Kew. The neo-classical building, which dates from 1714 and is Grade II* listed, forms the central focus of Kew Green. Its raised churchyard, which is on three sides of the church, has two Grade II* listed monuments – the tombs of the artists Thomas Gainsborough (1727–1788) and Johan Zoffany (1733–1810).

French Impressionist Camille Pissarro (1830–1903), a frequent visitor to England, was resident at 10 Kew Green when painting St Anne's as Church at Kew (1892).

== Services ==
On Sundays St Anne's Church holds a traditional Said Eucharist, a Sung Eucharist and (on the first Sunday of the month) Choral Evensong.

== Music ==
St Anne's Church houses a 19th-century pipe organ and is a venue for concerts, including those of the local orchestra, Kew Sinfonia.

== History ==
Founded in 1714 as a chapel within the parish of Kingston on ancient royal manorial land dedicated by Queen Anne, St Anne's Church has been extended several times since:

- As the settlement of Kew grew, attracting prosperous London merchants under royal patronage, St Anne's became a benefice in 1769 when it was united with St Peter's, Petersham; and in 1770, King George III undertook to pay for its first extension, designed by Joshua Kirby, who was buried in the churchyard four years later.
- In 1805, a new south aisle, designed by Robert Browne, was added, along with a gallery for the Royal Family's use.
- Under King William IV it was further extended in 1837 by Sir Jeffry Wyattville.
- A parish in its own right from 1850, a mausoleum designed by the architect Benjamin Ferrey was added in 1851, and an eastern extension, including a dome, in 1882–84, to the design of Henry Stock.
- Further extensions were made in 1902, 1979 and 1988.
- The church ceiling was repainted in 2013 and, to mark St Anne's tercentenary, a new baptismal font was installed in 2014.

St Anne's present parish hall, at right angles to the church and incorporating the previous choir vestry, was built in 1978. Its design echoes the materials and forms of the original church building.

== Features and ornaments ==
A collection of funerary hatchments honouring deceased royal or noble parishioners is on display in front of the church gallery, flanking a rare representation of Queen Anne's coat of arms. A hatchment commemorating George III's son, King Ernest Augustus of Hanover, was hung at St Anne's in 1851 and is now in the Museum of Richmond's collection. Inside the church are fine memorials, including those to the families of Sir William Jackson Hooker and Sir Richard Levett, beneath the tower which is inscribed: "Within this vault lie the remains of Sir Richard Levett, Knight, of Kew. Also of Lady Mary Levett, his wife, who died October 15th, 1722".

Just outside the church walls on its south side, is the Kew War Memorial, in the form of a large stone cross, commemorating the local soldiers who fell in the First and Second World Wars. Their names are listed not on the memorial but inside the church on a monument by William Sharpington.

== Parish events ==
=== Baptisms ===
- Francis Perceval Eliot, 9 October 1755, de jure 3rd Count Eliot and elder surviving son of Major-General Granville Eliot, 1st Count Eliot by Elizabeth Duckett

=== Marriages ===
- Francis, Duke of Teck married Princess Mary Adelaide of Cambridge on 12 June 1866. Their daughter "May" married George V becoming known as Queen Mary.
- Frederick George Preston (1882–1964), gardener, the Superintendent at Cambridge University Botanic Garden from 1919 to 1947, married Ada Viner (1887–1968) in 1910.

=== Burials ===
- William Aiton (d. 1793), first Keeper of the Royal Botanic Gardens, Kew and his son, William Townsend Aiton (d. 1849), who succeeded him as royal gardener
- Franz Bauer (d. 1840), Austrian microscopist and botanical artist, whose epitaph also pays tribute to his brother the botanical illustrator Ferdinand Bauer (d. 1826): "In the delineation of plants he [Franz] united the accuracy of a profound naturalist with the skill of the accomplished artist, to a degree which has been only equalled by his brother Ferdinand"
- Prof. Patrick Brenan (d. 1985), British botanist, and director of the Royal Botanic Gardens, Kew
- Dorothy, Lady Capell of Tewkesbury (d. 1721), benefactor of Kew Gardens
- Sir John Day (d. 1808), Advocate-General of Bengal
- Elizabeth, Countess of Derby (d. 1717), Mistress of the Robes
- Brigadier-General William Douglas (d. 1747), Whig Member of Parliament for Kinross-shire
- George Engleheart (d. 1829), Anglo-German miniature painter to the Court of King George III and his nephew John Engleheart (d. 1862)
  - Sir Gardner Engleheart (d. 1923) son of above, barrister and travel writer
- Thomas Gainsborough (d. 1788), portrait and landscape painter, is buried in the churchyard. His tomb is Grade II* listed. In 2011, an appeal was given to pay the costs of restoring it, and the tomb was restored in 2012. A street in Kew, Gainsborough Road, is named after him.
- John Haverfield (d. 1820), English gardener and landscape architect, whose father John Haverfield (d. 1784), was Head Gardener at Kew to Augusta, Dowager Princess of Wales
  - Revd Thomas Haverfield (d. 1866), Rector of Godington and Chaplain to Prince Augustus Frederick, Duke of Sussex
- Sir William Hooker (d. 1865), director of the Royal Botanic Gardens, and his son, botanist and explorer Sir Joseph Dalton Hooker (d. 1911)
- Joshua Kirby (d. 1774), 18th-century painter known for his work on linear perspective
- Sir Richard Levett (d. 1711), Master Haberdasher and Lord Mayor of London, his family members including grandsons, Revd Abraham Blackburne (d. 1797) and Lincoln's Inn Bencher Levett Blackburne (d. 1781), who sold Kew Palace to the Royal Family
- Jeremiah Meyer (d. 1789), English miniature painter
- Colonel Charles Russell (d. 1754) and his wife, Mary née Revett (d. 1776) of Chequers
- John Smith (d. 1888), botanist and the first curator of the Royal Botanic Gardens, Kew
- Timothy Tyrell (d. 1832), City Remembrancer
- Johan Zoffany (d. 1810), German neoclassical painter active in England

=== Formerly buried at St Anne's ===
- Prince Adolphus, Duke of Cambridge, and his wife Princess Augusta of Hesse-Kassel were buried at St Anne's Church in 1850 and 1889 respectively, before being exhumed and their remains removed in 1930 to St George's Chapel, Windsor Castle.

== Notable clergy and officers ==
Canon Giles Fraser is the parish's vicar; he took up his post in 2022. Former churchwardens of St Anne's include Anthony Saxton (1934–2015).

== Gallery ==
=== Church exterior ===
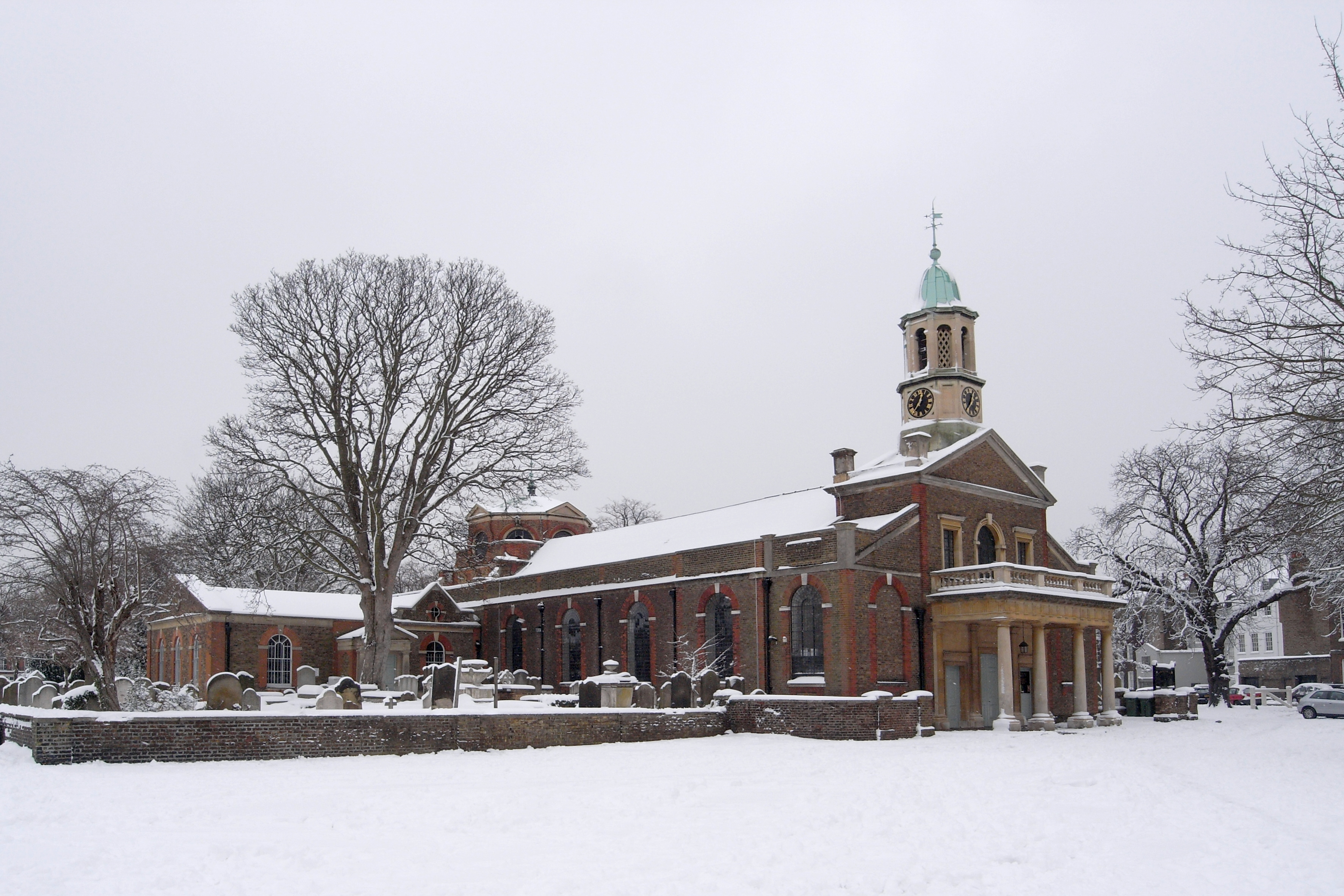
St Anne's Church in the snow

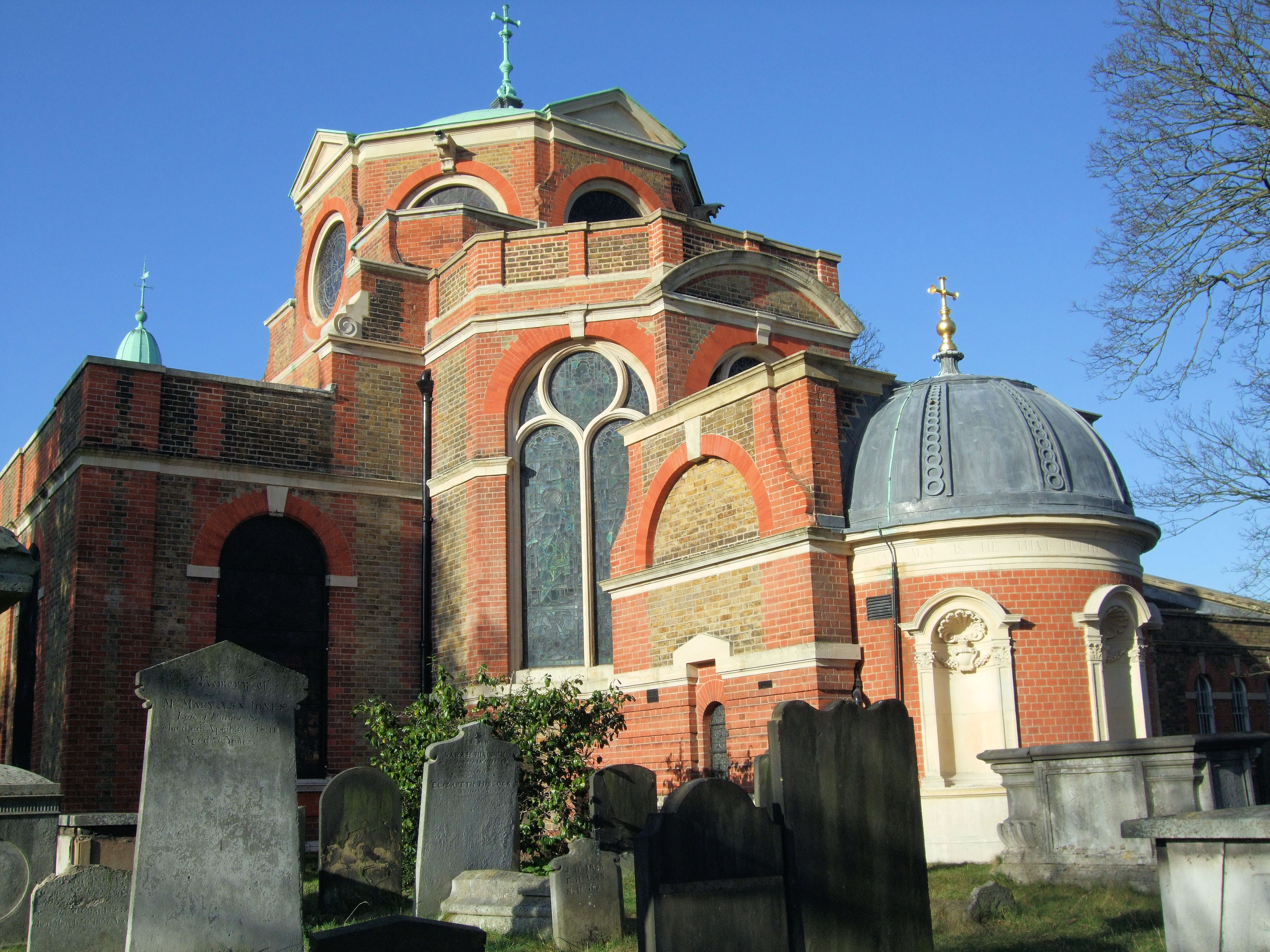
TRH the Duke and Duchess of Cambridge’s small-domed cenotaph at St Anne’s, Kew

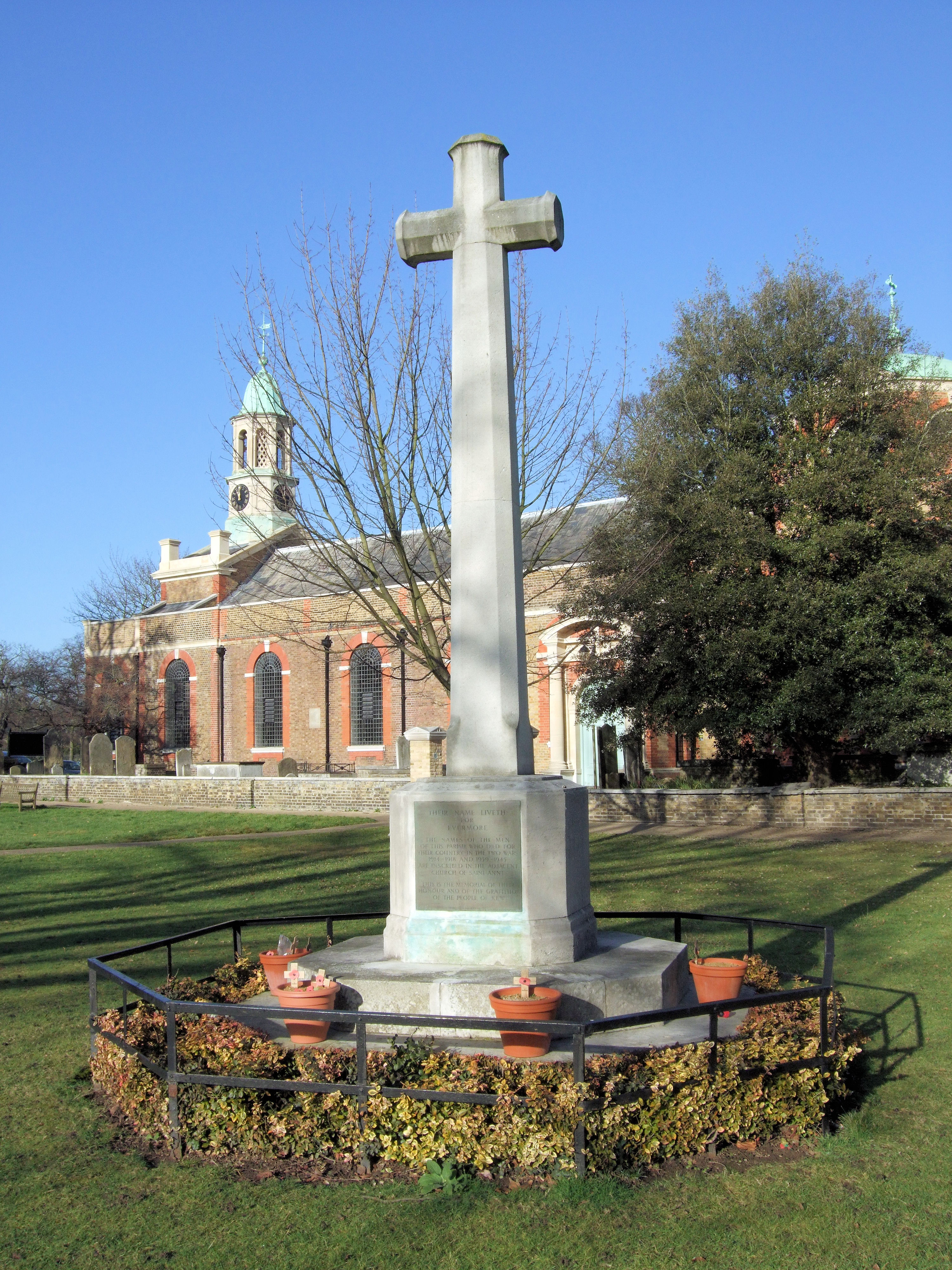
Kew Green
War Memorial

=== Church interior ===
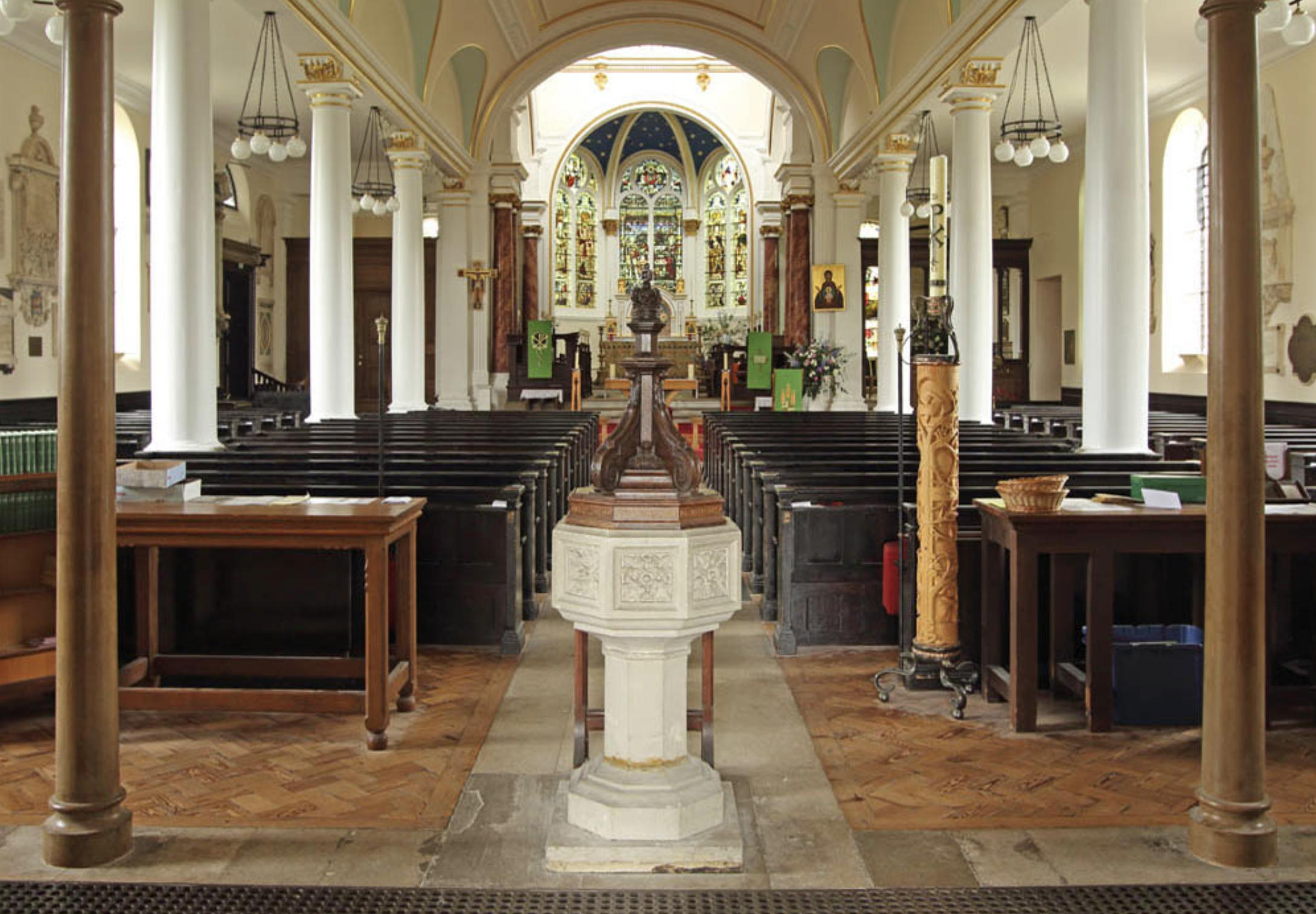
St Anne's baptismal font

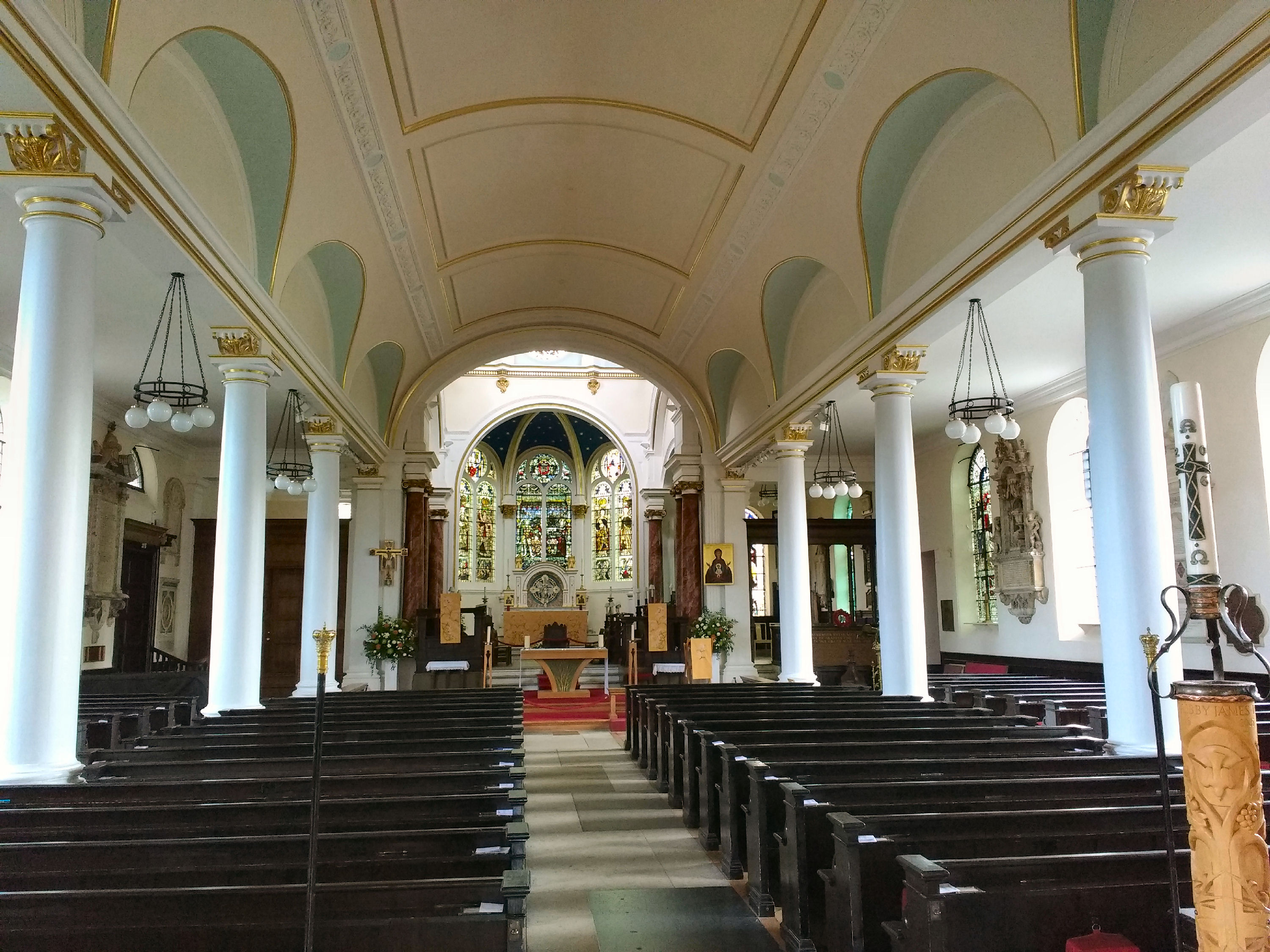
St Anne's nave

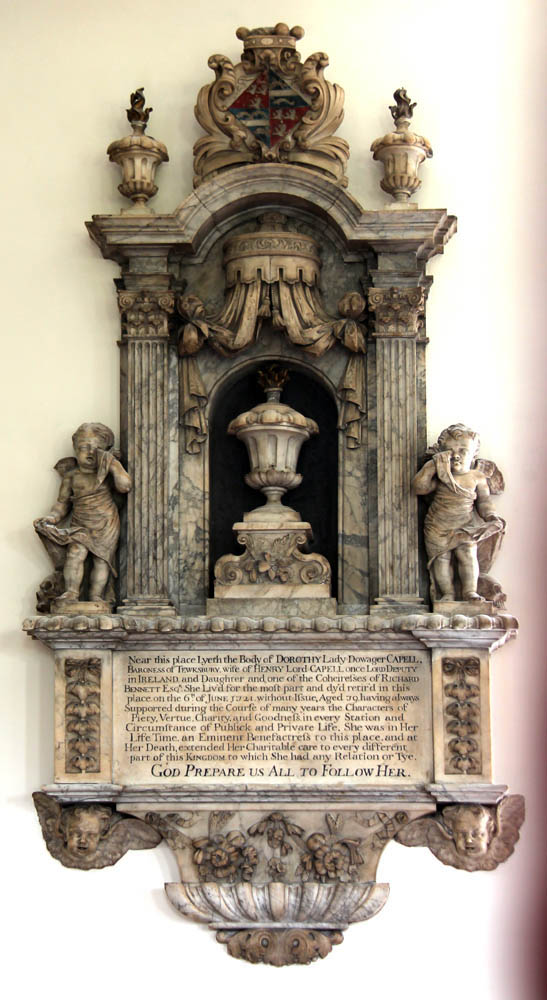
Dowager Lady Capell memorial

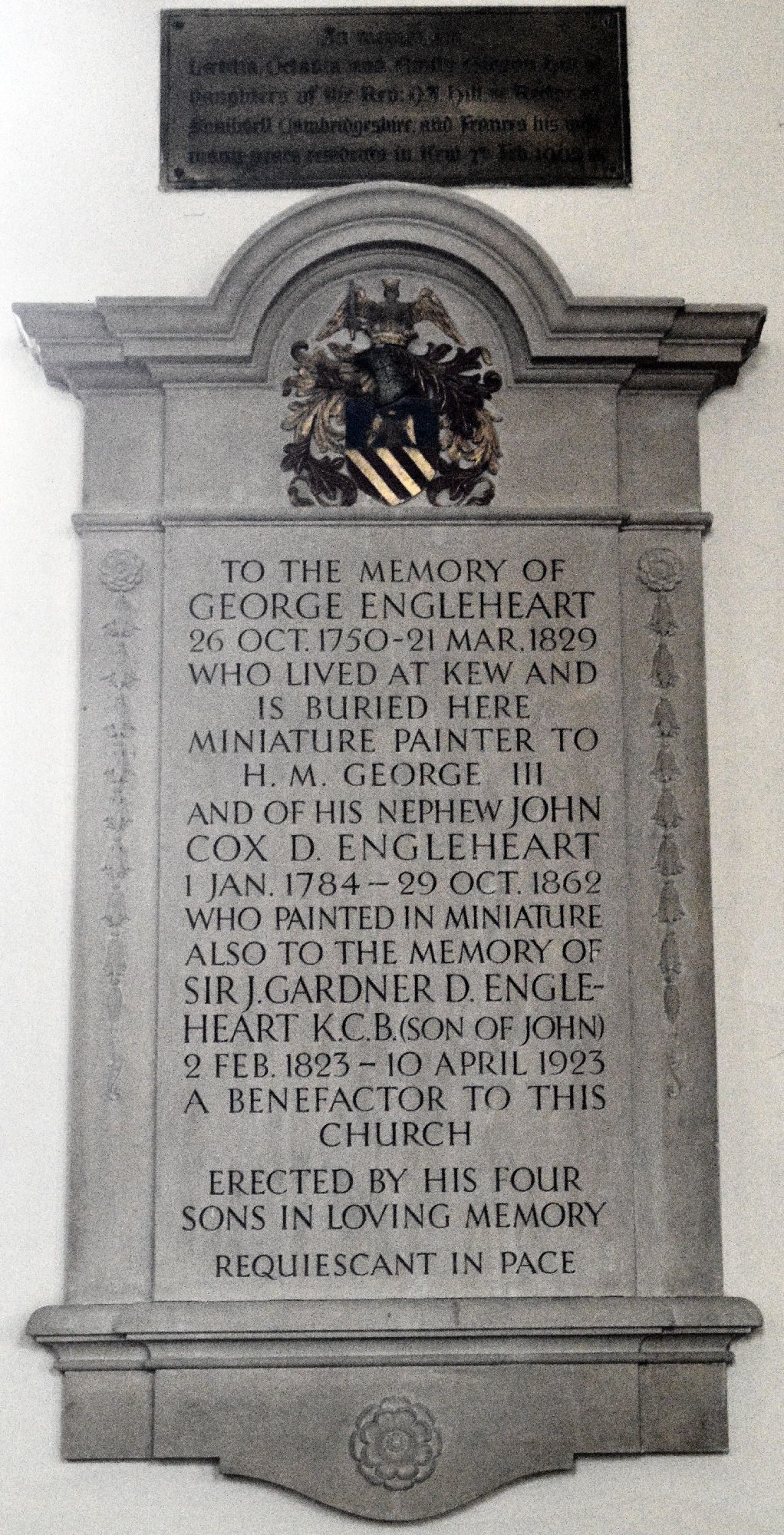
Engleheart family memorial

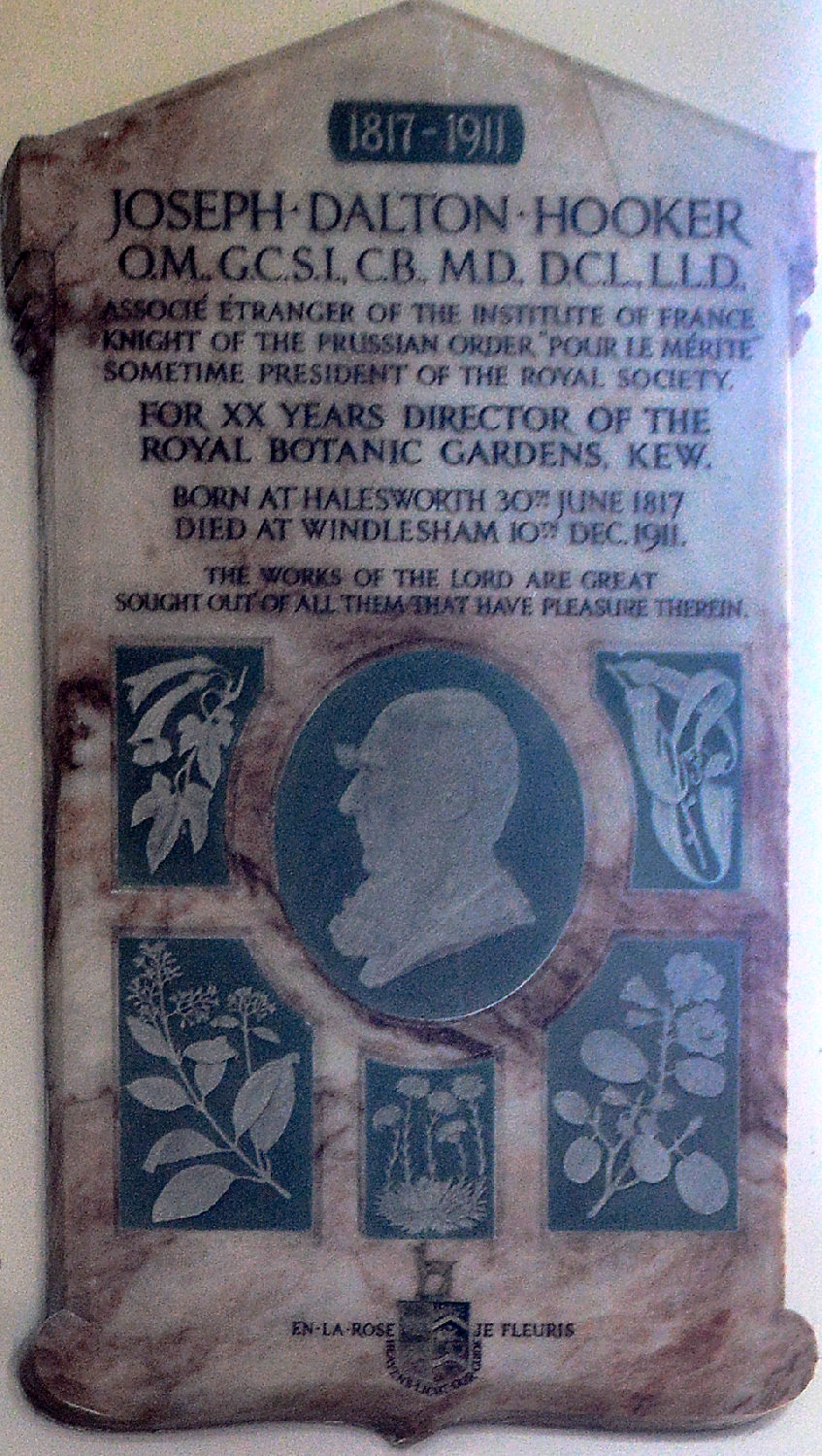
Sir Joseph Dalton Hooker memorial

=== Tombs and gravestones ===
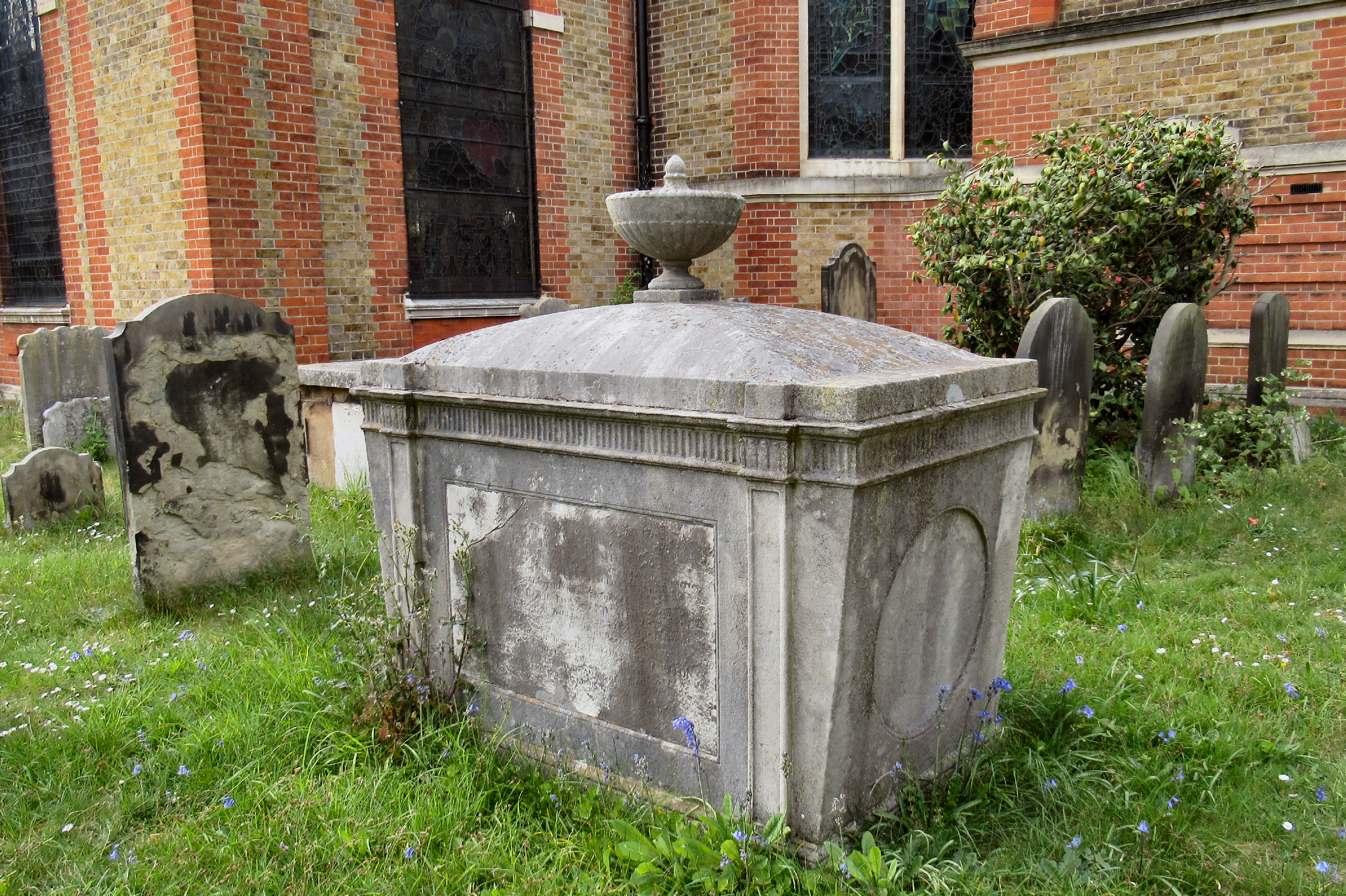
Aiton family tomb

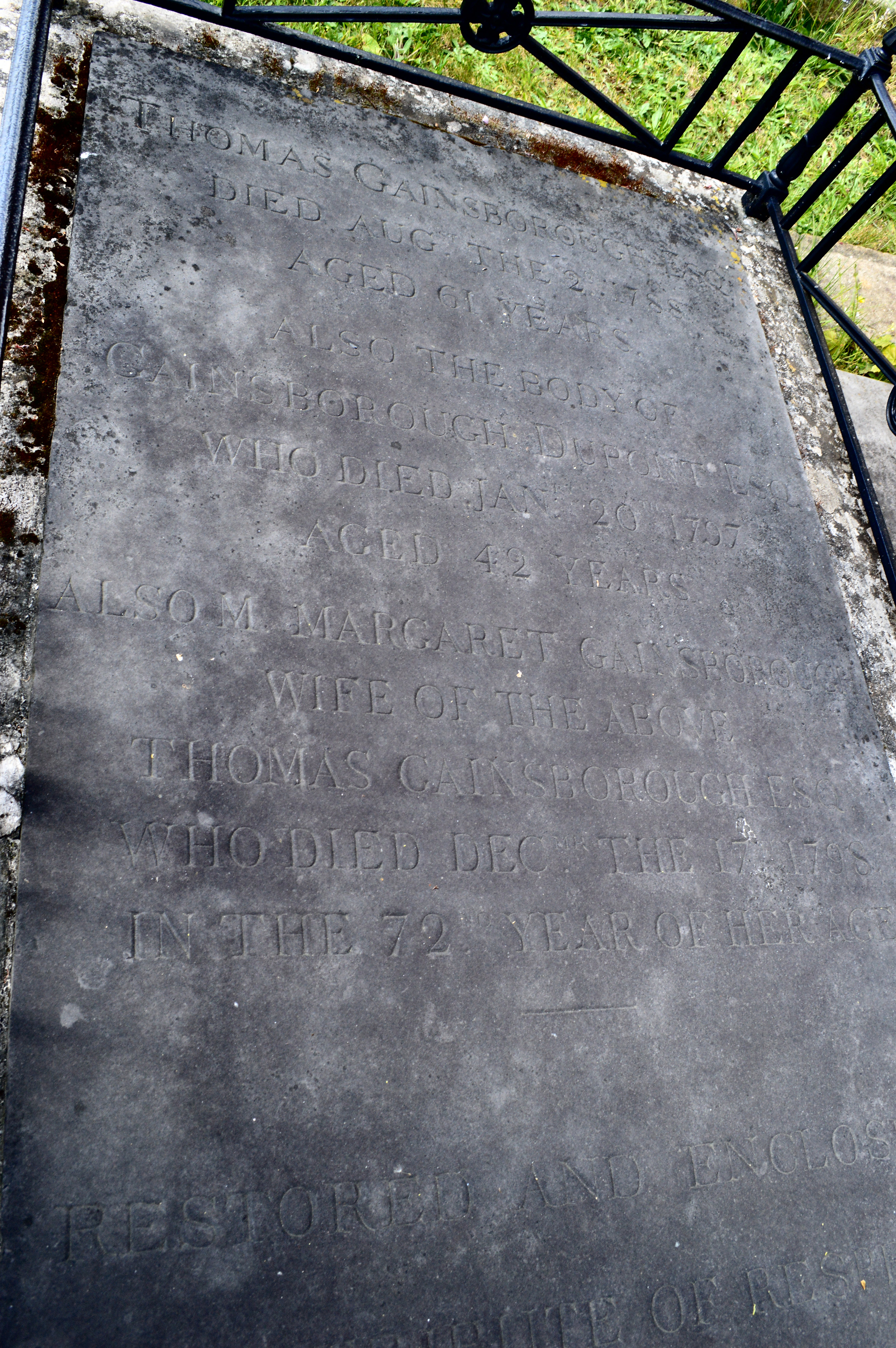
Tomb of Thomas Gainsborough

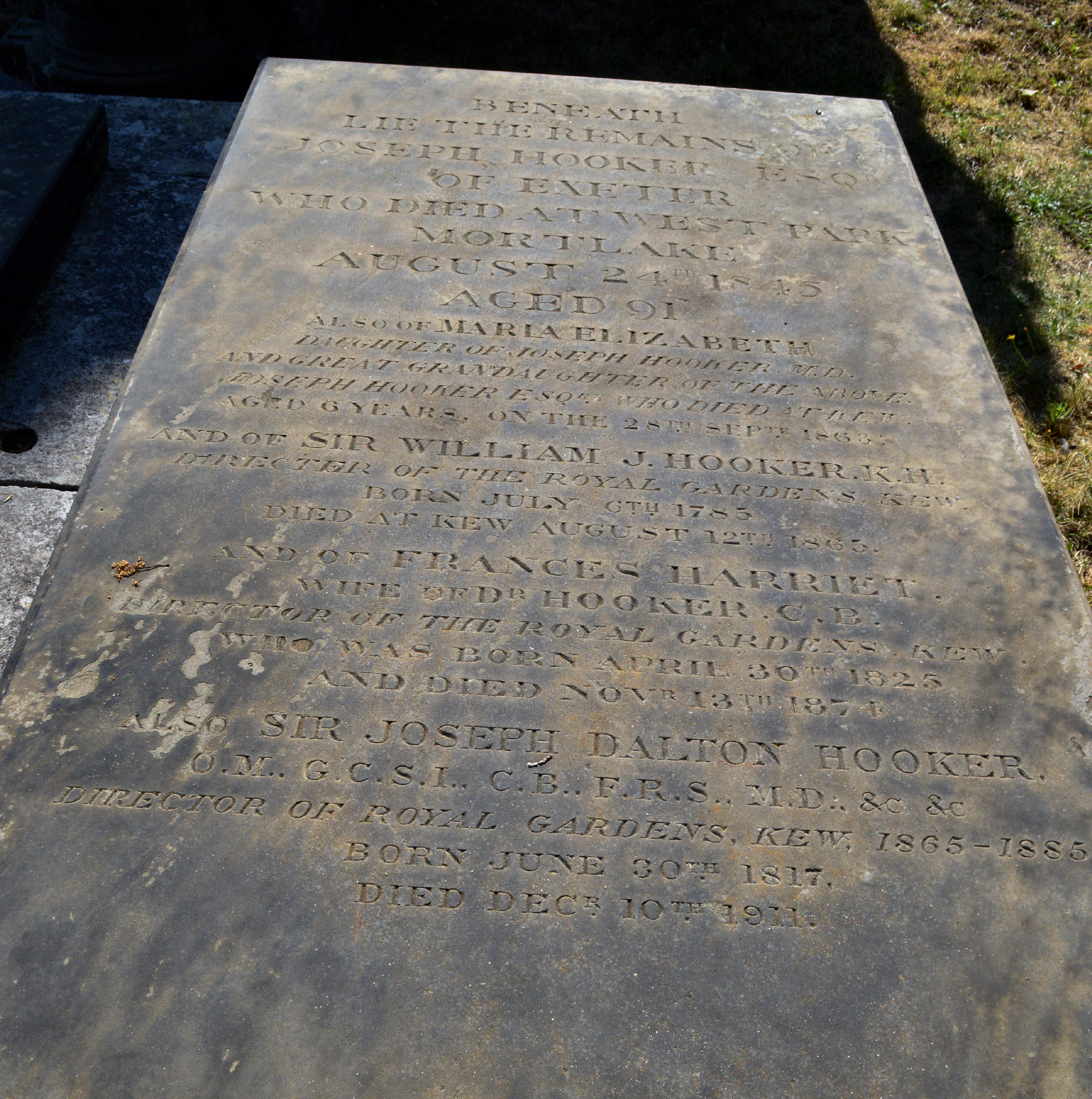
Hooker family gravestone

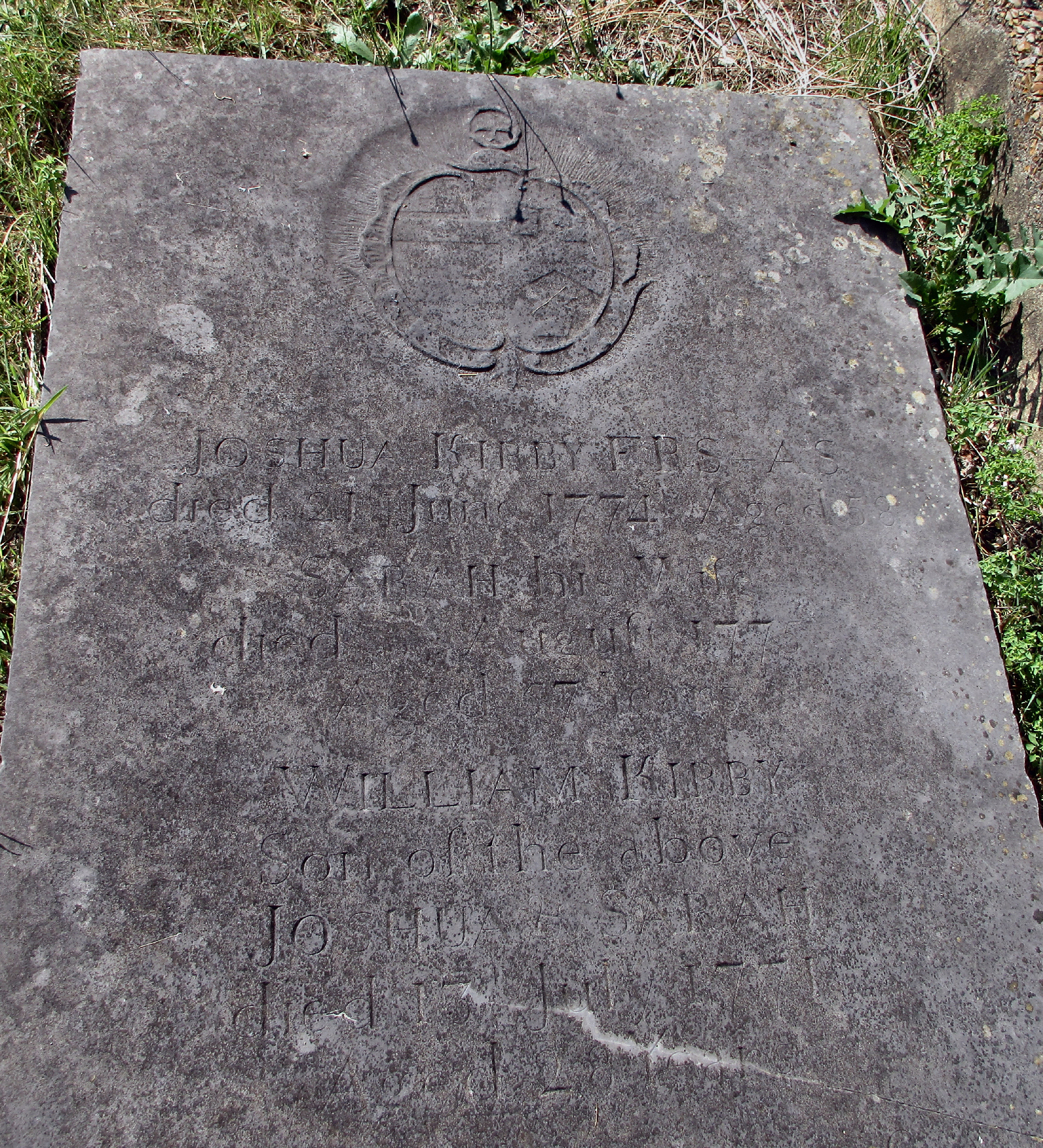
Tomb of Joshua Kirby

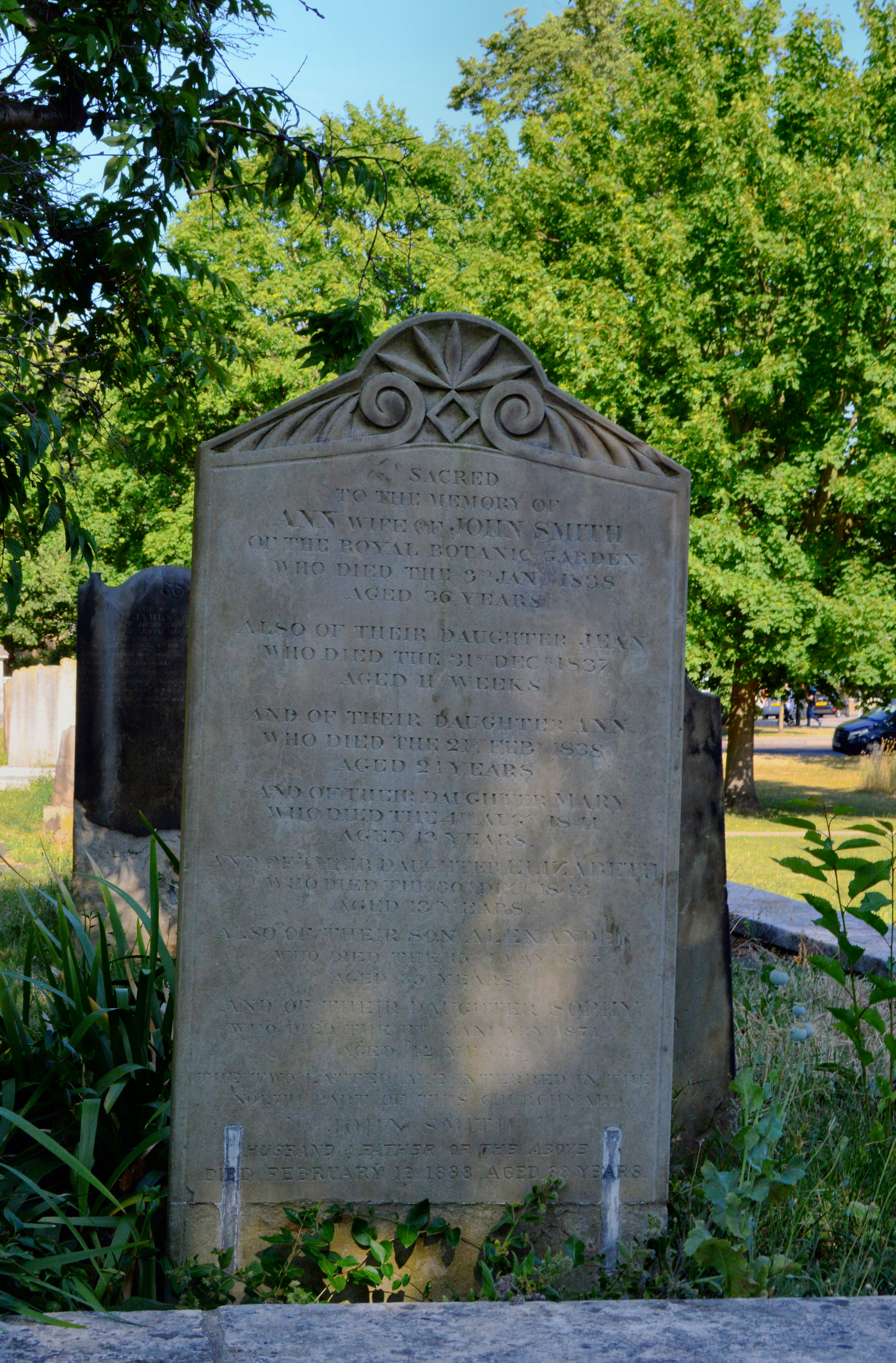
Botanist John Smith family gravestone

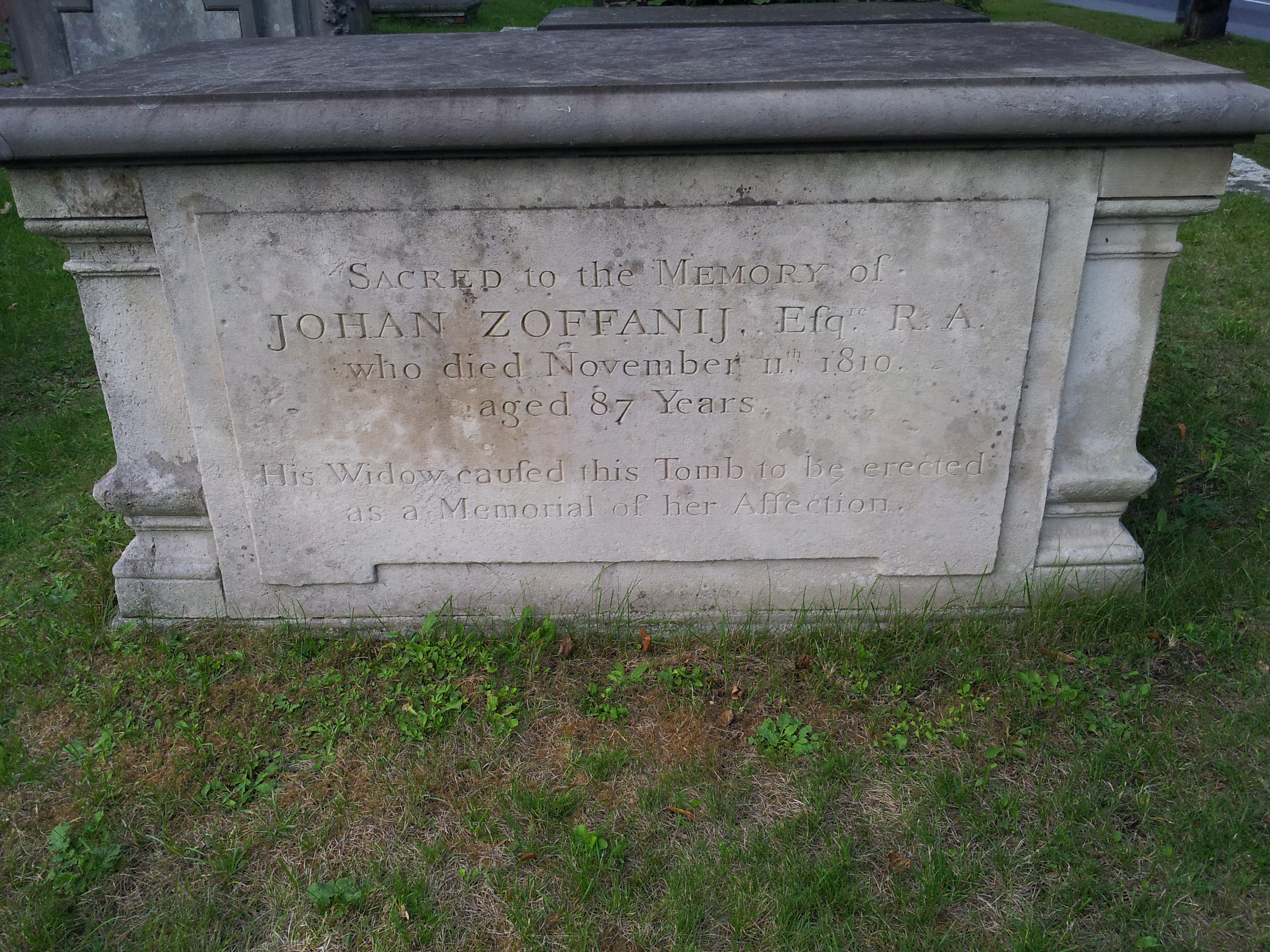
Tomb of Johan Zoffany

== See also ==
- Dr Giles Fraser
- Kew Gardens
- Kew Cricket Club
- St Peter's Church, Petersham
