= Giles Fraser =

English Anglican priest and journalist (born 1964)

The Reverend Canon Giles Fraser
- Vicar of St Anne's Church, Kew
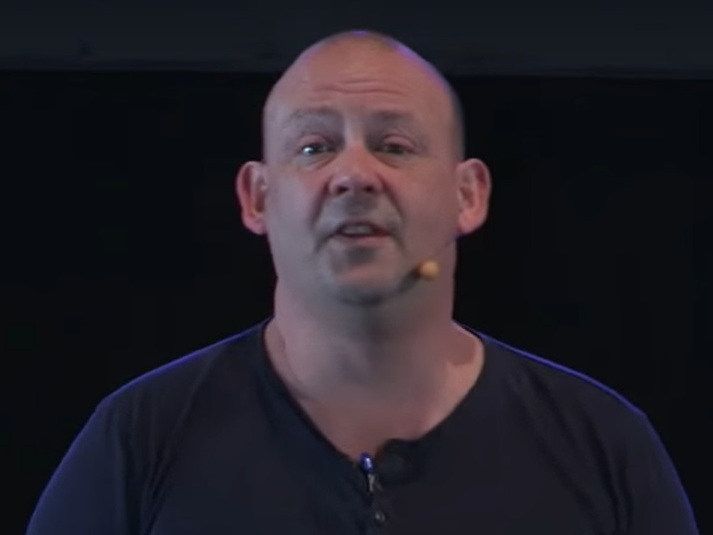
- Fraser speaking at Greenbelt Festival in 2016
- Church: Church of England
- Province: Canterbury
- Diocese: Southwark
- Appointed: February 2022
- Previous posts: Priest-in-charge at St Mary's, Newington (2012–2022); Canon chancellor of St Paul's Cathedral (2009–2011); Team Rector of St Mary's, Putney (2000–2009)

Orders
- Ordination: 1993 (deacon); 1994 (priest)

Personal details
- Born: Giles Anthony Fraser; 27 November 1964 (age 61) Aldershot, Hampshire, England
- Denomination: Anglican
- Parents: Anthony and Gillian Fraser
- Spouse: Sally Aagaard; Lynn Tandler (m. 2016)
- Children: Two daughters, three sons
- Occupation: Priest, journalist, and broadcaster
- Education: Newcastle University, Lancaster University

Giles Anthony Fraser (born 27 November 1964) is an English Anglican priest, journalist, and broadcaster who has served as Vicar of St Anne's Church, Kew, since 2022. He is a regular contributor to Thought for the Day and The Guardian, a panellist on Moral Maze, and an assistant editor of UnHerd.

== Early life and education ==
Fraser talks with Samira Ahmed, Francesca Stavrakopoulou and Adam Rutherford at Conway Hall in 2015.

Fraser was born to a Jewish father and a Christian mother and was circumcised according to Jewish tradition.

He was educated at Hollingbury Court preparatory school in Sussex, where he was beaten several times a week by the headmaster for minor misdemeanours, and at Uppingham School, a fee-paying Christian school, where he became a Christian. He studied at Newcastle University before training for ordained ministry at Ripon College Cuddesdon, near Oxford. He continued his studies at the University of Lancaster, where he was awarded a PhD in 1999 with a thesis entitled; Holy Nietzsche: Experiments in Redemption.

== Career ==
Fraser was ordained as a deacon in 1993 and as a priest in 1994, serving as curate of All Saints' Church in Streetly, Birmingham, from 1993 to 1997. From 1997 to 2006 he was a chaplain and then a lecturer in philosophy at Wadham College, Oxford.

In 2000 he became Team Rector of St Mary's Church, Putney, where he campaigned to raise the profile of the Putney Debates of 1647. While he was vicar there, St Mary's hosted the foundational meeting of Inclusive Church — which campaigns for all kinds of inclusion within the church — on 11 August 2003; Fraser served as its first chair of trustees until 2005.

From 2009 to 2011 he was canon chancellor of St Paul's Cathedral in London, with special responsibility for contemporary ethics and engagement with the City of London as a financial centre. In October 2011 Occupy London based its protest outside the cathedral, where Fraser said that he was happy for people to "exercise their right to protest peacefully". However, he resigned, as he could not sanction any policy of the cathedral chapter that involved using force to remove the protesters. He has said that it was "a huge matter of regret to leave" St Paul's, "but not for one moment have I thought that I did the wrong thing".

He was also a visiting Professor in the anthropology department at the London School of Economics and Director of the St Paul's Institute from 2009 to 2011.

In 2012 Fraser was appointed Priest-in-charge of St Mary's, Newington, in south London, and in 2022 he became Vicar of St Anne's Church, Kew, in south-west London.

Since 2009 he has been an honorary canon of the Diocese of Sefwi Wiawso in Ghana.

== Views and writing ==
Fraser has been involved in social and political advocacy and, according to The Daily Telegraph, "would be the first to admit that he is fond of the sound of his own voice". In 2019 he claimed that "all my political energy has been a reaction to Margaret Thatcher. I hated and continue to hate Thatcherism with a passion that remains undimmed".

In the 2016 referendum Fraser supported leaving the European Union, commenting that he found it "amazing that progressives are so keen to offer support to a remote and undemocratic bureaucracy that locks in a commitment to neoliberal economics". In 2019 he said he was "longing for a full-on Brexit – No Deal, please". In the 2019 general election he voted for the Conservative Party, even though he had just joined the Social Democratic Party.

Fraser had weekly columns in the Church Times from 2004 to 2013 , and in The Guardian from 2012 to 2017.

Fraser is the author or co-author of several books and is a specialist on the writings of the German philosopher Friedrich Nietzsche. He has lectured on moral leadership for the British Army at the Defence Academy at Shrivenham.

== Personal life ==
Fraser has been married twice. With his first wife, Sally Aagaard, whom he married in 1993, he had two daughters and a son.

On 16 January 2016, Fraser announced his engagement to Lynn Tandler, an Israeli Jew, who is a weaver and academic researcher. They were married on 13 February 2016. Their son was born in November of the same year.

In June 2017 Fraser suffered a heart attack and successfully underwent surgery.

== Awards and recognition ==
Fraser was awarded honorary doctorates by Edge Hill University, Lancashire, in 2013, and the Open University in 2015.

He was voted Stonewall Hero of the Year in 2012.

Church of England titles
Preceded by Edmund Newell	Canon chancellor of St Paul's Cathedral; 2009–2011	Succeeded by Mark Oakley
