= Kew Green =

Park in Kew, London

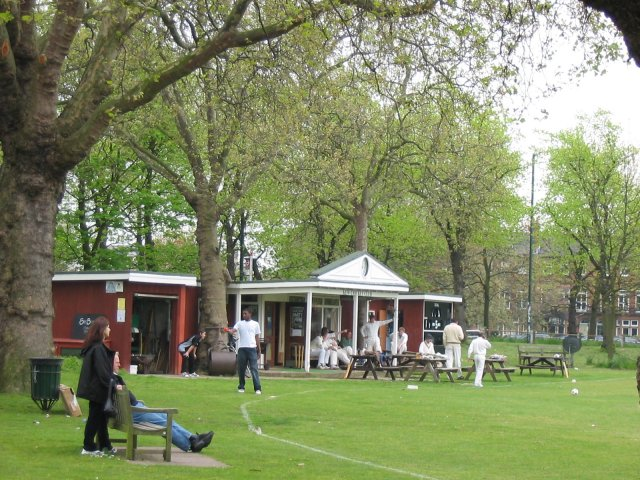
- The cricket pavilion on Kew Green
- Interactive map of Kew Green
- Type: Village green
- Location: Kew, London
- Coordinates: 51.485°N 0.288°W
- Area: 30 acres (12 ha)
- Operator: London Borough of Richmond upon Thames
- Status: Open all year

Kew Green is a large open space in Kew in west London. Owned by the Crown Estate, it is leased to the London Borough of Richmond upon Thames. It is roughly triangular in shape, and its open grassland, framed with broadleaf trees, extends to about thirty acres. Kew Green is overlooked by a mixture of period townhouses, historic buildings and commercial establishments. Since the 1730s, Kew Green has been a venue for cricket matches.

The eastern and south-western sides of the Green are residential; the northern side is largely residential, with a few pubs, restaurants, and the Herbarium Library; and a small number of commercial and retail buildings cluster in the south-east corner. To the north of the Green is Kew Bridge, carrying the busy South Circular Road, which in turn runs across the Green, dividing it into a large western part and a smaller eastern part. At the south end is St Anne's Church, Kew's parish church. At the west end of the Green is Elizabeth Gate, one of the two main entrances into Kew Gardens.

== History ==
Most of the older houses in Kew are built round the Green and along the eastern side of the Kew Road looking towards Kew Gardens. The Green itself is a big triangular space. It is mentioned in a Parliamentary Survey of Richmond taken in 1649, and is there described as 'a piece of common or uninclosed ground called Kew Green, lying within the Township of Kew, conteyning about 20 acres.' An 18th-century view, taken from a meadow to the east, shows Kew Bridge on the right, a small irregular lake with an island to the left. A road led to the western point of the Green, where the palace was visible, a windmill behind it; and trees, the trunks engirdled by seats, grew opposite the square-built church which stood isolated on the Green. Some land at the end of the Green was enclosed by George IV, and a meadow east of the bridge was made common land, as part of a design, never carried out, of building a new palace at Kew in place of the Dutch House. In the early 19th century Sir Richard Phillips described the Green as 'a triangular area of about 30 acres bounded by dwelling-houses,' and another description of a slightly later date speaks of the 'well-built houses and noble trees' surrounding it.

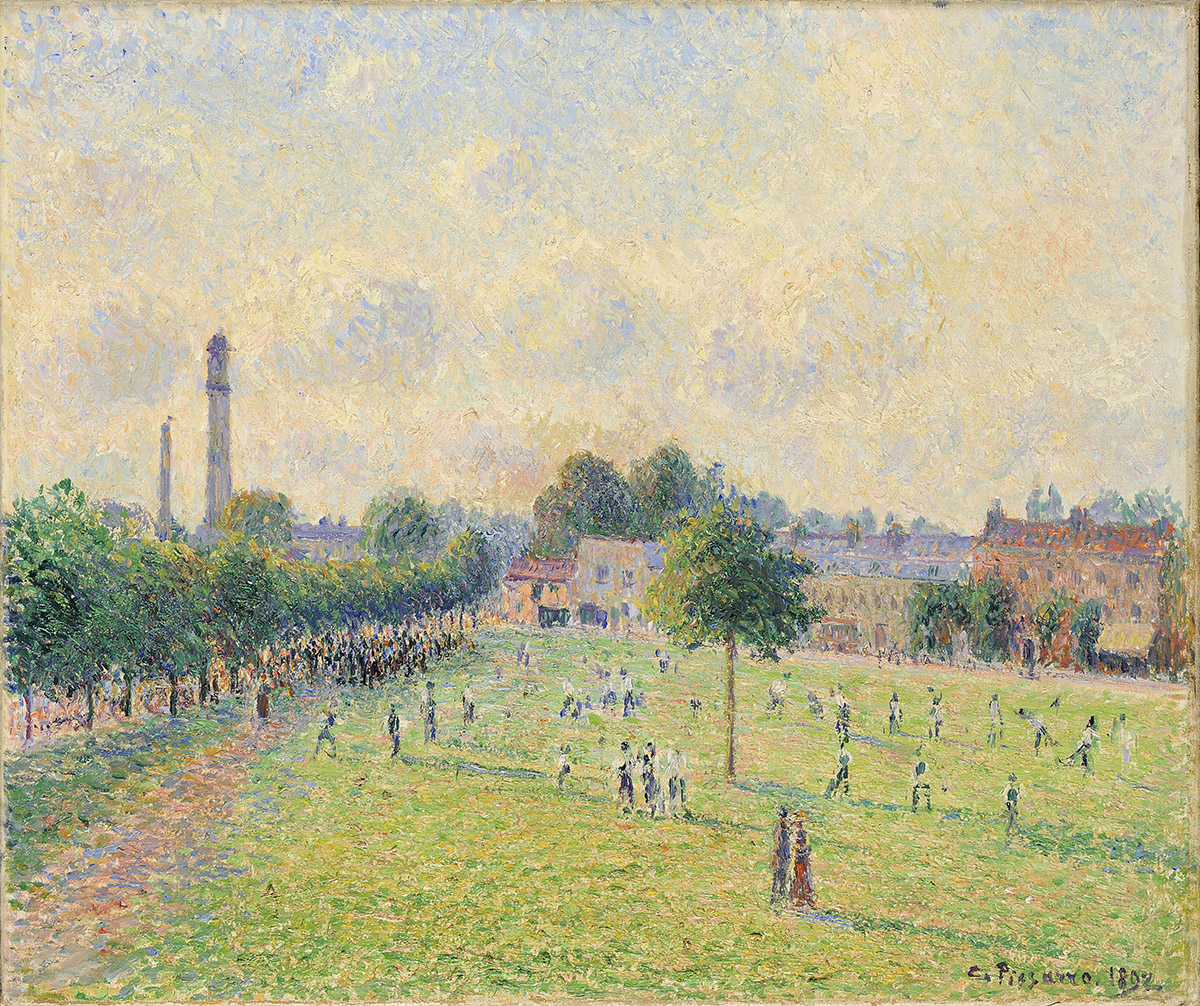
Kew Green by Camille Pissarro, 1892

Kew Green was in use as a venue for cricket by the 1730s and was used for a match between London and Middlesex in 1732. A Women's One Day International between New Zealand and Jamaica was scheduled to be held on the Green in 1973 as part of the inaugural Women's Cricket World Cup but the match was abandoned without a toss being made. This would have been the first Women's One Day International match ever played. The Green is still used for club cricket today as the home of Kew Cricket Club.

=== Kew Pond ===
Originally thought to have been a natural pond fed from a creek of the tidal Thames, what is now called Kew Pond was later enlarged in the 10th century to serve as a fishery. By the 17th and 18th centuries, it had become a village pond used for watering livestock. A herdsman was appointed in 1824, and the creek was partly filled in and built over to give access to the new King's School built to the north of the pond. It now has no natural inflow. During high (spring) tides sluice gates are opened to allow river water to fill the pond via an underground channel. The pond is concreted, rectangular in shape and contains an important reed bed habitat which is vital for conservation and resident water birds. Since 2010 the pond is managed in partnership with the Friends of Kew Pond.

== Notable buildings ==
Kew Green is also a street address. The odd-numbered buildings face the west side, and the even-numbered buildings face the east.

50, Kew Green was the original home of the King's School, founded in 1824. (The school's name changes to the Queen's School during a female monarch's reign.) The building was rebuilt in 1887. In 1969 the school moved to new premises in Cumberland Road and the Victorian schoolhouse was demolished. To preserve its legacy, there is an embroidery of the original building in the pew kneelers of St Anne's Church.

This table shows the buildings on the Green that are listed by Historic England (and designated as Grade II* or Grade II) or are locally listed by the London Borough of Richmond upon Thames as buildings of townscape merit (indicated as "BTM").

Kew Green Conservation Area
Image	Building	Dates	Grade	History
	Caxton House, 110, Kew Green	Early C19	BTM	From 1964 these were the premises of the Caxton Name Plate Manufacturing Company, which ceased trading in 1997. The company's name is still visible on the exterior of the building. The artist Banksy painted one of his London animal series in August 2024 on the wall near Kew Bridge; it features a goat perched on a thin wall, with rocks tumbling down. The artwork was removed in February 2025 by a specialist company in preparation for essential work on the building, which is owned by Boss & Co. gunmakers. At the back of Caxton House, facing Westerley Ware, is the Victorian mortuary building. To the west used to stand the blacksmiths, which had originally been the Rose & Crown pub; this was demolished in 1900 for the construction of the third Kew Bridge.
	108, Kew Green		BTM	From the 19th century onwards there were several tea rooms and cafés along Waterloo Place (the name given to this group of cottages). This was the last to close, in 2006.
	98-106, Kew Green	Early C19	II	This is a terrace of five houses.
	90-96, Kew Green	1816	II	This is a terrace of four houses. On No. 96 a stone tablet is inscribed "Waterloo Place. 1816".
	The Greyhound, 82, Kew Green	1937	BTM	The current building replaced the Victorian pub.
	68 & 70, Kew Green		BTM	Nos. 68 and 70 are a pair of Italianate houses.
	62 & 64, Kew Green	Early C19	II	This was originally a terrace of three cottages. No. 66 was rebuilt.
	52-56, Kew Green	18C	II	This is a row of three cottages.
	40-46, Kew Green	19C	BLM	This is a Victorian terrace.
	28-38, Kew Green	19C	BLM	This is Victorian red-bricked terrace.
	26, Kew Green	19C	BLM	This is bay-fronted Victorian house.
	Haverfield House, 24, Kew Green	C19	BTM	This was the home of the Superintendent of Kew Gardens 1766-1784, John Haverfield (1694-1784), who managed the royal estates in Kew for Princess Augusta. He is buried at St Anne's church. His son, also called John Haverfield (1744-1820), was gardener and landscape architect. His daughter was painted by Gainsborough. The Hon. Gilbert James Duke Coleridge (1859-1953), barrister and sculptor, son of the 1st Baron Coleridge, died here in 1953.
	Eastside House, 22, Kew Green	Early C19 house	II	This was the home of the painter Arthur Hughes; it has a blue plaque.
	20, Kew Green	Mid to late C18	II	
	14-16, Kew Green		BTM	These are shops, mostly retaining their original shopfronts. No. 14 was formerly the Post Office. In 1912 suffragettes destroyed the contents of the pillar box. What is outside now is a Queen Elizabeth II pillar box. In the 18th century this was a pub called the Cock and Hoop, later the Ewe and Lamb.
	10, Kew Green		BTM	There is a blue plaque on the Gloucester Road wall of No. 10a Kew Green to the impressionist painter Camille Pissarro who stayed here in 1892.
	Coach and Horses, 8, Kew Green		BTM	Kew's oldest inn, The Coach and Horses is now a pub and restaurant.
	Bank House, 2 & 4, Kew Green	C18	II	No. 4, formerly Barclays Bank, is reputedly where the Palace Guard lodged in the late 18th century.
	9 & 11, Kew Green	Late C18 or early C19	II	These two houses, with shops below, retain their Victorian shop fronts.
	Gumley Cottage, 17 & 19, Kew Green	early C18	II	1 Cambridge Terrace. Two storeys with dormers, the door for No. 17 replaced with a window. Used as student accommodation for Kew students.
	21, Kew Green	Mid C18 house	II	
	23 & 25, Kew Green	C18	II	The botanical artist Walter Hood Fitch lived at 4, Cambridge Terrace.
	29 & 31, Kew Green	C18	II	Late C18 or early C19 pair of houses.
	Kings Cottage, 33, Kew Green	C18	II	Home from 1751 to 1754 of John Stuart, 3rd Earl of Bute (1713-1792), honorary director of Kew Gardens, 1754–1772, and, later, Prime Minister. It was later home of Cosmo Lang, Archbishop of Canterbury. It has also been known as Church House. Originally a royal residence, built by Queen Charlotte when it was called Princess Elizabeth's House, it was a 'grace and favour' house.
	Cambridge Cottage, 37, Kew Green	Early C19	II	It was built by Christopher Appleby, a barrister, in the early 18th century. In 1758 it was then leased by Lord Bute. In 1772 it was purchased by George III as a home for two of his sons. In 1838 it became the home of his seventh son, the Duke of Cambridge (1774–1850), who remodelled and extended it in 1840, becoming his permanent residence and renamed Cambridge Cottage. His widow, the Duchess of Cambridge (1797–1889) died here and was buried in St Anne's Church; her body was later moved. Prince George, Duke of Cambridge (1819–1904) owned the house after the death of his mother, and when he died in 1904 Edward VII donated it to Kew Gardens and was formerly Museum No 3.
	The Gables, 39-45, Kew Green	C18	II	The cast iron gates are listed. Rebuilt in 1908 on the former stables of Cambridge Cottage for gardening staff.
	49, Kew Green	Early C18	II	Since 1851 the official residence of the director of Kew Gardens. There is a blue plaque to Sir William Hooker and his son, Sir Joseph Hooker.
	47, Kew Green	1931	BTM	The Royal Botanic Gardens' administrative block, formerly the entrance to the gardens.
	Royal Cottage, 51, Kew Green	C18	II	Formerly two houses, used as a grace-and-favour residence. Conrad Noel (1869-1942), a prominent Christian socialist, was born here.
	Herbarium House, 55, Kew Green	early C18	II	Next to the main gates it is the official residence of the keeper of the Herbarium.
	Sewer Vent	early C19	II	The cast-iron sewer vent pictured opposite is marked with the maker's name "F. Bird & Co., 11 Gt. Castle St. Regent St.".
	Elizabeth Gate	1848	II*	Designed by Decimus Burton, the Elizabeth Gate was originally called the Main Gate before being renamed in 2012 to commemorate the Diamond Jubilee of Elizabeth II.
	Lamp standards	Early C19	II	Outside Elizabeth Gate are early 19th-century cast-iron gas lamp standards with monograms of King George IV or King William IV.
	Gate posts	Early C19		Running across the Green are cast-iron railings with gate posts decorated with plates bearing the royal insignia. Both designs show the royal crown, one with the inscription 'Honi soit qui mal y pense', surrounded by national floral emblems. The gate possibly marks the route of a track from Elizabeth Gate to Kew Bridge used by the royal coach.
	The Herbarium, Kew Green	C18, 1877 and later	II*	The original house, dating from the 1770s, was built for Peter Theobald, sold to Robert Hunter in 1800 and was known as Hunter House. It was bought by the Crown in 1818 to be the home of the Duke of Cumberland, who became king of Hanover in 1837; the house was then called Hanover House. It was then used to house the Herbarium, established in 1853 by William Hooker, with new wings added in 1877, Wing C, by John Lessels, Wing B 1902-1903, Wing A 1932, Wing D 1969, 1988 Wing Q, and 2009 the new library extension.
	Hanover House, 57, Kew Green	C18	II	Next to the Herbarium is Meyer's House (now called 'Hanover House') home of the artist Jeremiah Meyer. Sir Peter Lely also had a house in this location. The road next to Hanover House was originally called Water Lane, later named Ferry Lane.
	K6 red telephone box	1935	II	Outside the Herbarium is a K6 telephone box, designed by Sir Giles Gilbert Scott to commemorate the Silver Jubilee of King George V.
	59 & 61, Kew Green	Late C18	II	No. 61, Abingdon House, formerly The Imperial Restaurant opened in 1913 by Will Evans. It was home of Joshua Kirby, the architect for the reconstruction of St Anne's Church in 1770; he is buried at St Anne's.
	63, Kew Green	C18	II	Originally known as Snailwell House, it was restored after a fire in 1909 by Will Evans as the Dieudonne Restaurant.
	Warden House, 65, Kew Green	C18	II	
	White House, 67, Kew Green	Early C19	II	
	Ada Villa, 69, Kew Green	Mid C18	II	In the early 20th century Pitt's Restaurant was a meeting place for various groups and societies.
	71, Kew Green	Late C18, Early C19	II	Ivy House.
	Danebury House, 73, Kew Green	C18	II	
	Beaconsfield, 77, Kew Green	1668	II	Originally known as 'The Little Red House', it was the home of Friedrich Albert, a page, barber and hairdresser to Queen Charlotte. His daughter was Charlotte Papendiek, a lady-in-waiting to Queen Charlotte, who wrote memoirs about the household of George III. It later was the home of Francis Engleheart (1713-1773). This was the home for 53 years of Clementina Jacobina Sobieski Schnell (1760–1842), daughter of Colonel Allan Macdonald of Kinlochmoidart who had escaped after the Battle of Culloden; she was related to Flora MacDonald. Her husband, Dr Francis Schnell, was tutor to Ernest Augustus, Duke of Cumberland. She died in 1842 when her headdress caught fire.
	The Rose and Crown, 79, Kew Green		BTM	A pub overlooking the cricket pitch on Kew Green; called The Cricketers from 2013 to 2025, it has now resumed its previous name
	Flora House, 81, Kew Green	1880	BTM	This was once The Flora Restaurant owned by Will Evans, who died here in 1949.
	Capel House, 83, Kew Green	Early C18	II	This was reputedly the dower house of Lady Capel (d 1719), widow of Henry Capell, Baron Capell of Tewkesbury, who in her will left money to five schools, including the King's School in Kew. There is a memorial to her in St Anne's church.
	Ask, 85, Kew Green		BTM	Formerly the King's Arms pub, it is now a day nursery and a cafe. Next to the King's Arms used to stand 87, Thames House, & 89 a sweet shop; they were demolished in 1900 for the construction of the third Kew Bridge.
	St Anne's Church	1714	II*	The churchyard contains the Grade II* listed tombs of the artists Thomas Gainsborough (1727–1788) and Johan Zoffany (1733–1810) The cross-shaped war memorial near the church is Grade II listed.

== Bibliography ==
- Cassidy, G. E. (1982). Kew As It Was. Nelson: Hendon Publishing Co. Ltd. ISBN 9780860670742.
