= Jeremiah Meyer =

German-born British painter

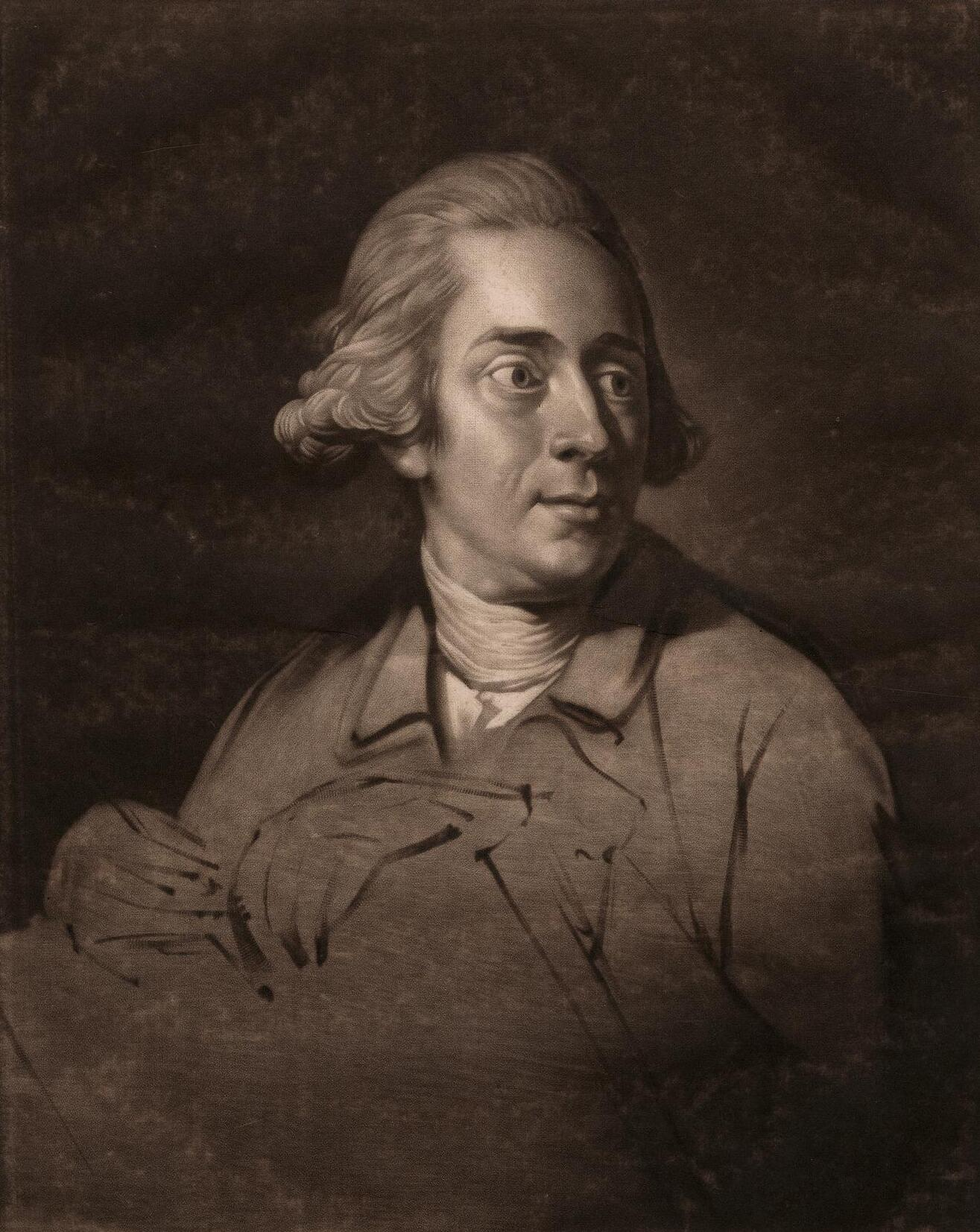
- Engraving by William Pether after a George Dance the Younger portrait, 1789
- Born: Jeremias Majer; 18 January 1735; Tübingen, Duchy of Württemberg, Holy Roman Empire
- Died: 19 January 1789 (aged 54); Kew, Surrey, England
- Resting place: St Anne's Church, Kew; 51.4838°N 0.2879°W
- Known for: Miniaturist
- Spouse: Barbara Marsden (m. 1763)
- Father: Wolfgang Dietrich Majer
- Patrons: King George III; Queen Charlotte

Jeremiah Meyer RA (born Jeremias Majer; 18 January 1735 – 19 January 1789) was a German-born British painter who specialised in portrait miniatures. He was Painter in Miniatures to Queen Charlotte, Painter in Enamels to King George III and was one of the founder members of the Royal Academy.

== Early life and education ==
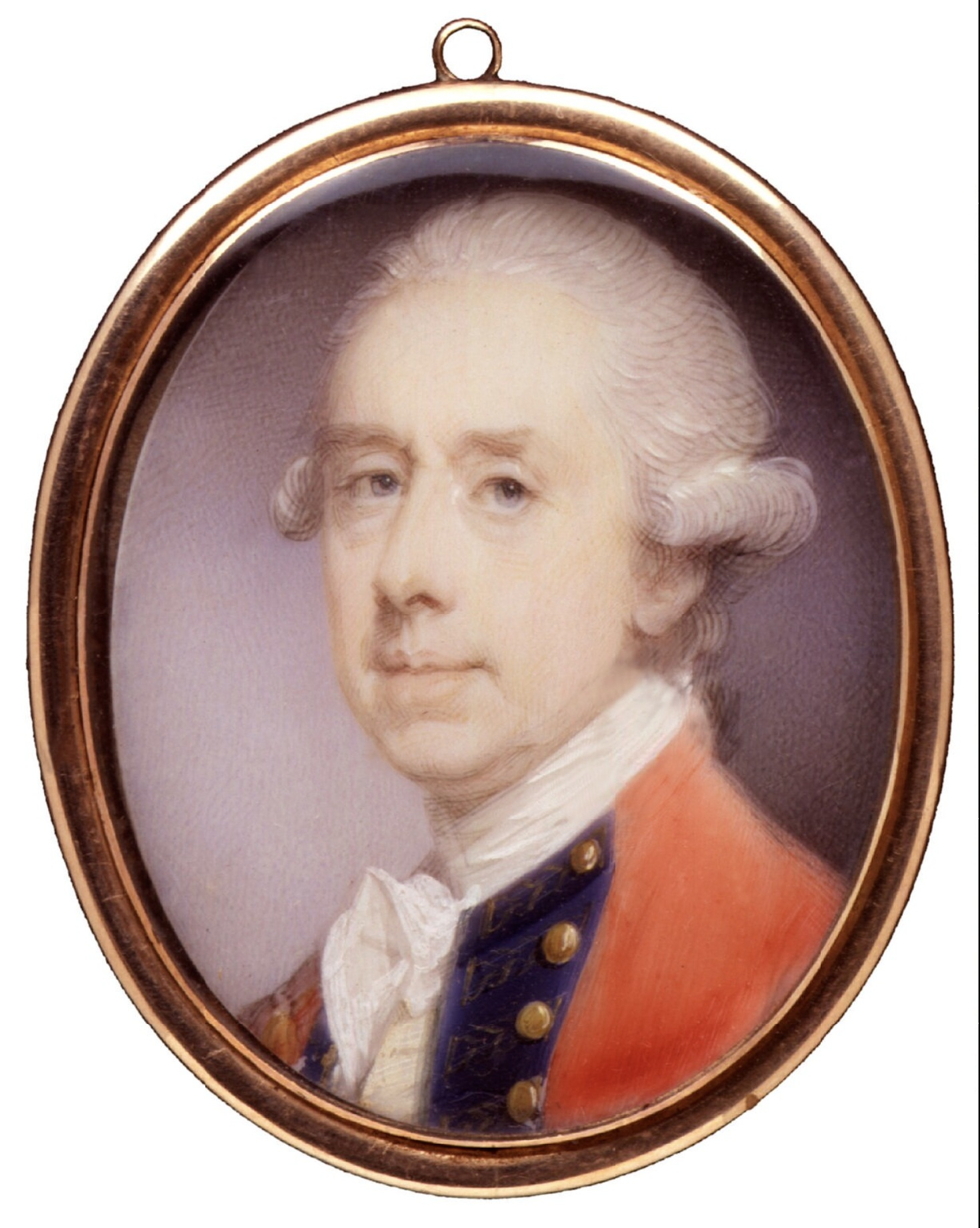
c. 1770–1780 miniature portrait of Thomas Gage by Meyer

Meyer was born in Tübingen as a son of the German painter Wolfgang Dietrich Majer. On 20 October 1750 he was brought to England by his father. He certainly received his first artistic instructions from his father, but his aunt, Anna Katharina Majer, also taught the young and talented Meyer, particularly in the art of etching. In London, Jeremiah Meyer is said to have worked in George Michael Moser's workshop to earn some money. He decorated lockets and jewellery boxes with enamel and was also able to take drawing lessons from Moser, who was one of the most sought-after drawing teachers. Moser's workshop was also famous as a meeting place for German painters. This also enabled Jeremiah Meyer to make progress in the language. Jeremiah Meyer quickly came to St Martin's Lane Academy to study drawing and most likely learned miniature painting from Gervase Spencer. In 1757–8, Meyer studied enamel painting with Christian Friedrich Zincke, paying £400 for tuition and materials. His style was influenced by attention to detail of the work of Joshua Reynolds.

== Career ==
Meyer's background as an enamel painter contrasted with the training of contemporary English miniaturists such as Samuel Finney and Gervase Spencer. These initially worked in watercolour on ivory and only turned later to enamels in response to the growing popularity of enamellists like Zincke.

At the end of 1755 and the beginning of 1756, he was nominated as a full member of Hogarth's St Martin's Lane Academy. In 1760 and 1764 Meyer exhibited enamels with the Society of Arts. In 1761 he was awarded a gold medal prize of £20 by the Society of Artists for a portrait of the king in profile, drawn from memory, engravings from this by James MacArdell and others were very popular. In the same year the king gave Charlotte a miniature of himself by Meyer, set in an oval of diamonds within a pearl bracelet, as an engagement present. In 1764 he was appointed miniature painter to Queen Charlotte, and painter in enamel to King George III.

In 1765 Meyer became one of the original directors of the Incorporated Society of Artists, and in 1768 was chosen a foundation member of the Royal Academy. He contributed to the academy's exhibitions until 1783, sending several portraits of members of the royal family. The establishment of the Royal Academy pension fund in 1775 was due to Meyer's initiative. He was a friend of both George Romney and William Hayley, and brought them together in 1776. Several details of Meyer's life come from Hayley's biography of Romney.

His name has often been associated with the head of the king used on coinage. It is not certain that his work was used on coins minted in Britain, but his profile of George III was used on a pistole of 1767 for the Electorate of Brunswick-Lüneburg.

== Personal life ==
Meyer was naturalised in 1762. In 1763 he married Barbara Marsden, an artist from childhood, and lived for many years at various addresses in central London, including 13 and 9 Tavistock Row in Covent Garden with a view of the market place. Further Meyer residences—flats and houses—have been documented in South Molton Street, Grosvenor Street and, later, Hackney Road and since 1770 a notable estate in Kew Green. They had eleven children together, of whom seven, three sons and four daughters, reached adulthood. One of his sons, George Charles Meyer, worked as a civil servant in Calcutta apparently on the recommendation of Joshua Reynolds who described him as "the son of a particular friend of mine".

Since 1770 he retired to Kew and lived with his family in an estate of four houses on the north side of Kew Green, for many years simply known as 'Meyer's House'. The adjacent road leading from Kew Green to the River Thames, now 'Ferry Lane', was known as 'Meyer's Alley' for over a century after Meyer's death. The house is now known as 'Hanover House'. It was Grade II listed in 1950 and forms part of the Herbarium of Kew Gardens.

Jeremiah Meyer was buried in St Anne's Churchyard, in Kew Green. His grave was next to that of his Academy colleague and friend, Thomas Gainsborough, at whose funeral five months earlier Meyer had been one of the pallbearers. A mural tablet to his memory, with a medallion portrait and some eulogistic verses by Hayley, is inside the north aisle of the church. This mural tablet was financed by a common opera project between William Hayley and Jeremiah Meyer in which Meyer played a key role. Meyer was survived by three daughters and another son, William, and his widow, who remained at the house until her death on 18 April 1818.
