= Richard Levett =

English merchant and politician

Sir Richard Levett
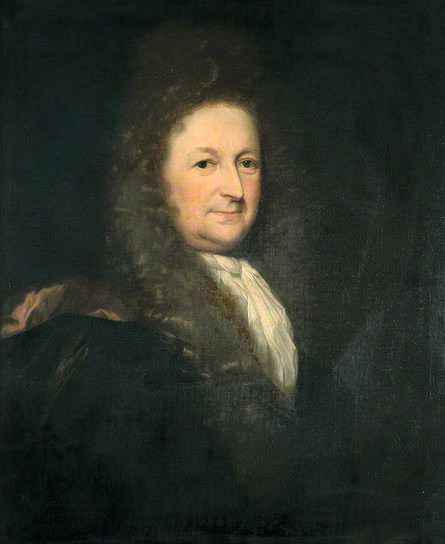
- 1699 portrait by Godfried Schalcken

Lord Mayor of London
- In office 1699–1700
- Preceded by: Sir Francis Child
- Succeeded by: Sir Thomas Abney

Personal details
- Born: 1629 Ashwell, Rutland
- Died: 20 January 1711 Kew, Surrey, England
- Resting place: St Anne's Church, Kew, Richmond-upon-Thames
- Spouses: Mary Shipton; Mary Clarke
- Children: Elizabeth, Mary, Frances, Anne, Richard
- Parent(s): Revd Richard Levett; Katherine Brademore

Sir Richard Levett (1629 – 20 January 1711) was an English merchant and politician who was elected Lord Mayor of London in 1699. Born in Ashwell, Rutland, he moved to London and established a pioneering mercantile career, becoming involved with the Bank of England and the East India Company.

Acquainted with many prominent individuals during his time in the City of London, among them Samuel Pepys, Sir John Houblon, Sir William Gore, Sir John Holt, Sir Charles Eyre, and Dr Robert Hooke, Levett acquired several properties in Kew and Cripplegate.

== Early life and career beginnings ==
Although born into a once-powerful Sussex Anglo-Norman family (its surname derives from the village of Livet in Normandy), the future Lord Mayor grew up in straitened circumstances after the family lost much of its medieval wealth. Levett's father was an intruding minister and he was ejected in 1660 after the Restoration when the legitimate incumbent returned to the living. Although born with connections, Richard Levett and his brother Francis were thrown onto their own resources, and were as much pioneers in business as they were in society.

Despite their prestigious Norman lineage, the Levett brothers were middle-class. They represented an emerging meritocratic England succeeding the previous feudalist social order. (Their father, Rev. Richard Levett, held Puritan sympathies.) Their enterprise demonstrated that diligence could elevate commoner Englishmen into the upper-middle class. The Levett brothers' rise was enabled, by trade expanding and feudal privileges diminishing in favour of a growing mercantile middle class. Although nominally a Tory, Levett's practices denoted a free market capitalist.

Levett and his brother Francis began as small haberdashers, trading everything from tobacco to textiles. The sons of a country parson in Rutland, the two Levett brothers imported goods into England, which they then sold to chapmen at fairs across the country, including those at Lenton, Gainsborough, Boston, Beverley and elsewhere. As the British Empire began to expand, bolstered by increasing military might, aggressive merchants like the Levetts leapfrogged other foreign and domestic competitors. From their small operation grew a behemoth, with the Levett brothers using their own ships to import everything from tobacco to linens.

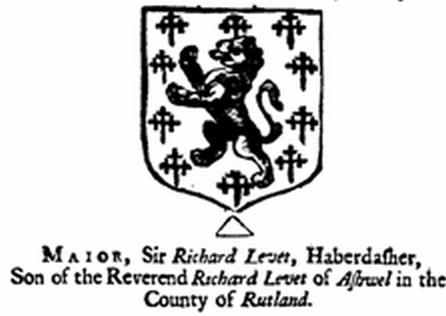
Arms of Lord Mayor Levett, Stype's Survey of London, 1720

Eventually, their empire became among the largest factors of its day in England, with an immense working capital estimated between £30,000 and £40,000 in 1705, buying tobacco and other goods around the world for import into the English market. The firm they set up came to embrace trade with the Levant (principally Turkey and Syria), India, Africa, the West Indies, North America, Ireland as well as Russia. Contemporaneous records show Levett often immersed in the details of arranging shipping terms and trading voyages to places as disparate as Guinea and the English Southern Colonies. Like many London merchants of the period, Levett was involved in the Atlantic slave trade, overseeing the transportation of African slaves from various West African ports for sale in the English colonies of Virginia and Maryland.

In 1705, Levett sent a letter to the Board of Trade and Plantations to complain about interference with his ships. "The Governors of Virginia and Maryland", Levett complained to the Board, "had refused to permit two ships of theirs to saile from those colonies with their ladings.... And it being alleged in the petition that the masters of those two ships (who came away in ballast) were obliged to give security to touch at the Maderas in their way home." The Board directed its agent to "write to the said masters at Bristol for further information in that matter."

== The building of a business empire ==
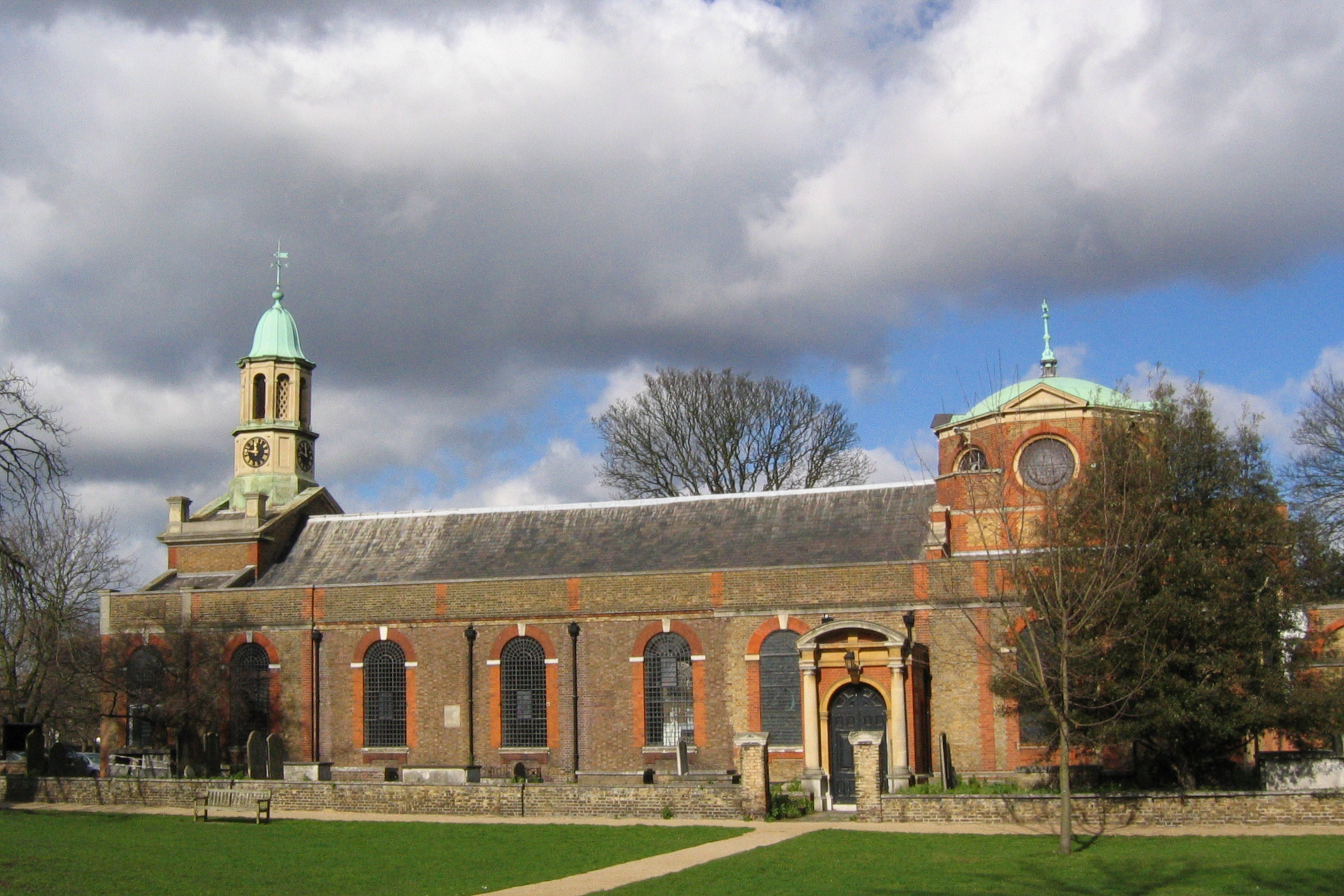
St. Anne's Church, Kew, burial place of Sir Richard Levett and family

By the early eighteenth century, the firm of Sir Richard Levett and Company had become one of England's largest, dominating especially the enormous tobacco trade with the Virginia Colony, as well as the tobacco coming from Turkey. Detailed records of tobacco transactions at the time between Levett and Virginia planters reveal that the London merchant drove a hard bargain.

Levett eventually was named a Merchant Adventurer of the London East India Company, one of the first directors of the new Bank of England, and even, on 17 February 1698, a member of the New England Company. With his deep interests in shipping, Levett was also one of the earliest investors in what became Lloyd's of London, the insurance market place. He was knighted at Kensington in 1691.

In the close-knit world of London traders at the dawn of the eighteenth century, Levett often found himself acting in conjunction with, or competing against, most of the other large traders known to him. At a meeting of the Governors and adventurers of the London East India Company held on 30 April 1701, for instance, Levett found himself in the company of his fellow London traders and ranking India servants "Gov. Thomas Cooke, Deputy Sir Samuel Dashwood, Sir Thomas Rawlinson, Sir Jonathan Andrews, Sir John Fleet, Sir William Gore, Sir Henry Johnson, Sir William Langhorne, Sir William Prichard and Mr. Peter Vansittart."

In the year of 1695, Levett's increasingly powerful firm accounted for 3,894,864 pounds of tobacco imported into England. Of that, the firm subsequently re-exported some 1.3 million pounds to Holland, Germany and the Baltic. Acting as middlemen in an increasingly vertically integrated corporation, which was coming to resemble a modern trading company, Levett and his partners began raking in enormous profits, partly due to their access to large amounts of capital, as well as their access to a proprietary shipping fleet.

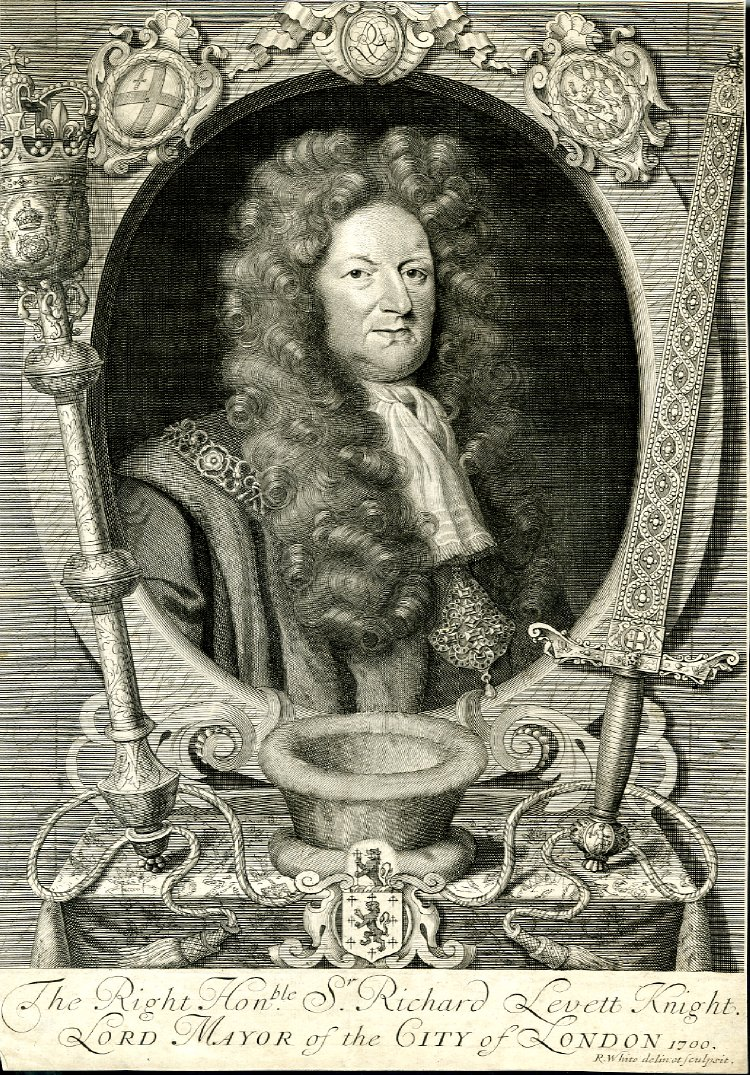
The Rt Hon'ble Sir Richard Levett, Lord Mayor of London, 1700

As their trading grew, Richard Levett became a prominent fixture on the London scene. Master of the Haberdashers' Company (1690 and 1691), he was elected as a City Alderman before serving as Sheriff for 1691/92, and then Lord Mayor of London (1699/1700). As Master of the Haberdashers' Company, Levett played a key role in building fellow Master of the Haberdashers' Company Sir Robert Aske's Hospital, with Levett's friend Robert Hooke serving as architect.

From his home in Cripplegate, formerly the home of Sir Thomas Bloodworth, a previous Lord Mayor, Levett conducted his trading empire and the mayoral business. Levett's home, formerly that of the controversial Bloodworth, who served as Lord Mayor at the time of the Great Fire of London, was a large town house on the old Noble Street near Lily Pot Lane. (The home was later occupied by printer Charles Rivington.)

== Home and family life ==
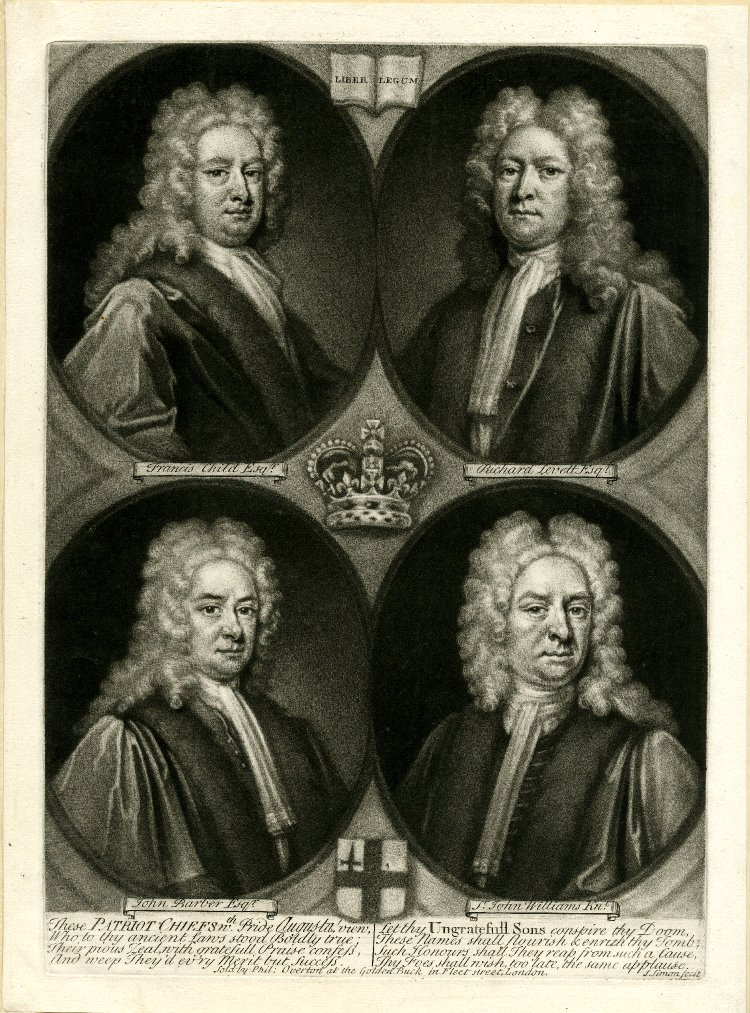
Portrait of four Aldermen of London, 1725, including Richard Levett, Esq., son of Lord Mayor Sir Richard Levett. Alderman Levett was declared bankrupt in 1730

Also available for Levett's use were two country homes at Kew, including the Dutch House (now Kew Palace), as well as the large estate surrounding them. (After Levett's death, his daughter Mary Thoroton leased the Dutch House to Queen Caroline, wife of King George II, for use as a children's nursery, likely accounting for the decision of Frederick, Prince of Wales, to settle at Kew with his wife, Augusta, Princess of Wales. Both Levett homes as well as the estates surrounding them were sold to the royal family in 1781 by Sir Richard's grandson Levett Blackburne, Esq., a prominent Lincoln's Inn barrister).

Sir Richard Levett was married to Mary Crispe, likely the daughter of merchant adventurer Sir Nicholas Crispe of Fulham, Middlesex. The couple were prominent in London during the years following the Restoration. Levett was mentioned by Samuel Pepys in his diaries; he was frequently mentioned in contemporary accounts of weddings and soirées of the age, and became a philanthropist, donating to charities like St. Thomas' Hospital in Southwark, and church charities in the West Country and Ireland.

Sir Richard Levett's wife, in particular, was a generous donor to religious causes. Edmund Calamy, the English nonconformist churchman, refers to "Lady Levett" in his memoirs as his great "friend", and who was noted in other accounts as a generous donor to religious and educational causes. Minister Calamy even dedicated a sermon to Lady Levett.

Samuel Pepys, the diarist and Secretary of the Admiralty (and friend of Robert Blackburne, his predecessor and brother of the Archbishop of York), apparently socialised with Alderman Levett. "After staying here a great while at Westminster", Pepys noted in his diary of 14 March 1668, "we (went) back to London, and there to Philips's, and his man directed us to Mr. Levett's, who could not come, and he sent us to two more, and they could not; so that, at last, Levett as a great kindness did resolve he would leave his business and come himself, which set me in great ease in my mind."

Levett also figures prominently in the recently published diaries of politician Roger Whitley, Member of Parliament from Wales and then from Chester. Whitley was a prominent figure in Chester and Whig politician. Whitley's massive diaries reveal frequent meetings between the two men.

== Death and legacy ==
Sir Richard Levett died in 1711. He and his wife and several of their daughters are buried in the churchyard at Kew, where there are memorials to them in the church as well as to the Blackburne family with whom they intermarried. The inscription carved into a mural slab set in the tower of Saint Anne's Church, Kew, reads: "Within this vault lie the remains of Sir Richard Levett, Knight, of Kew. Also of Lady Mary Levett, his wife, who died October 15th, 1722." In 2018, Levett was commemorated in the name of a new street in Kew, Levett Square.

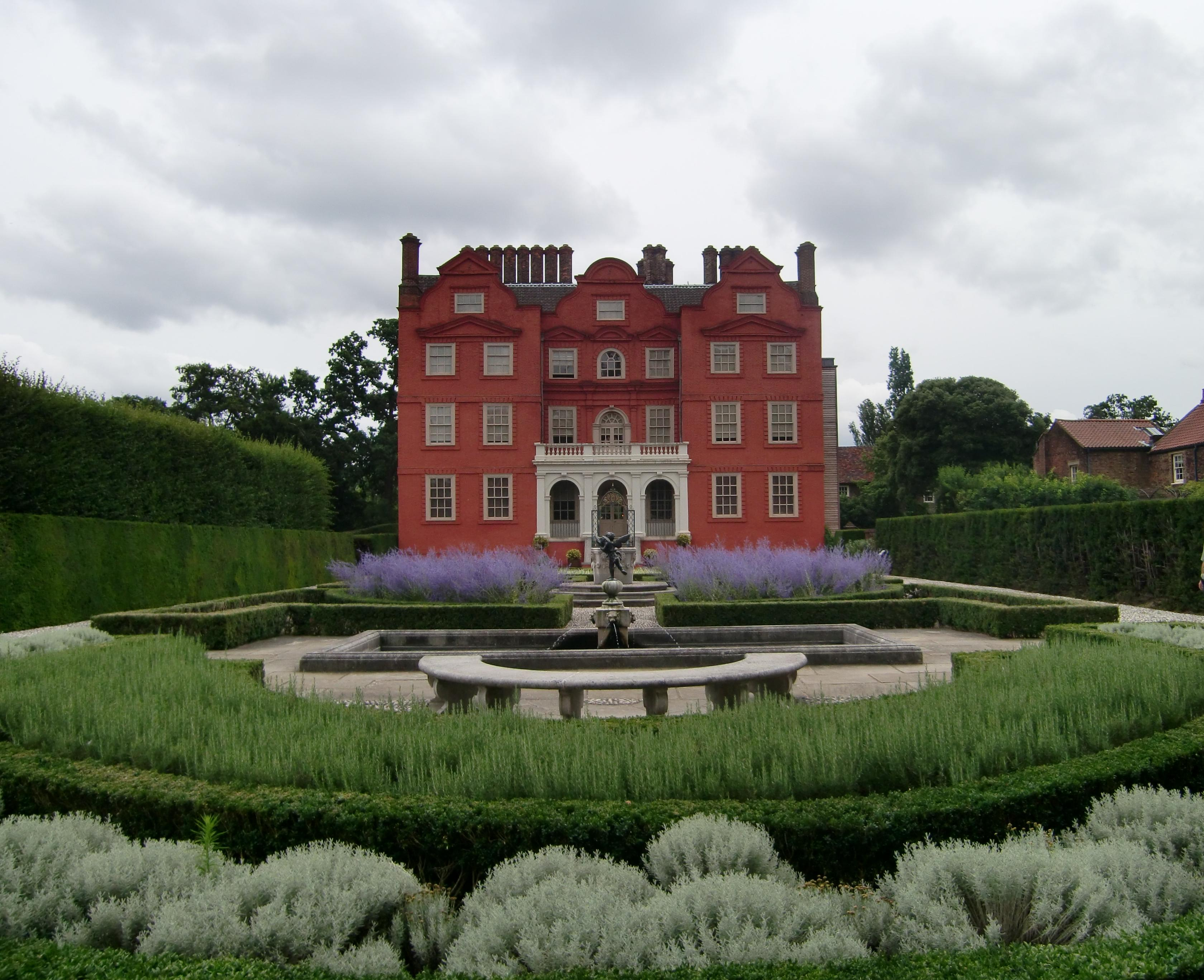
The Dutch House (Kew Palace), home of Sir Richard Levett, later sold to the royal family.

Sir Richard Levett's son Richard, also an Alderman (1722) and Sheriff of London, inherited his father's interests, but apparently mismanaged them, filing for bankruptcy in 1730. Consequently, many heirlooms of the Levett family of Sussex passed to the family of the Lord Mayor's daughter and her husband, the Hulse family of Hampshire, and are today at Breamore House, the Hulse family seat. (Alderman Levett, son of the Lord Mayor, died and was buried at Temple Church in 1740).

The third brother of Richard and Francis Levett was Very Rev. Dr. William Levett, Principal of Magdalen Hall, Oxford, and Dean of Bristol. The brothers' uncle, brother of their father Rev. Richard Levett of Rutland, was courtier William Levett Esq., who accompanied King Charles I during his flight from Cromwellian forces, and thence to his imprisonment at Carisbrooke Castle and to his eventual execution.

Some twelve years following Sir Richard's death, his widow Mary, by then living at Bath, changed her will to exclude two paintings she had previously bequeathed to a friend at Bath upon discovering that the portraits of King Charles I and his Queen were painted by the artist Anthony van Dyck. Given the discovery, Dame Mary Levett made a codicil to her will directing that the valuable paintings be sold with the proceeds going to her granddaughters. Presumably the Levett family had inherited the paintings from the Lord Mayor's uncle, groom of the bedchamber to the late King.

== See also ==
- Haberdashers' Company

== Sources ==
- The Levetts of Staffordshire, Dyonese Levett Haszard, Milford, Staffordshire, privately printed
- The Making of the English Middle Class: Business, Society and Family Life in London, 1660–1730, Peter Earle, University of California Press, Berkeley, 1989
- The Thorotons, Myles Thoroton Hildyard, privately printed, 1991

Civic offices
Preceded by Sir Francis Child	Lord Mayor of London; 1699– 1700	Succeeded by Sir Thomas Abney
