= Kew =

Suburb of London in the London Borough of Richmond upon Thames

Coordinates: 51.4759°N 0.2863°W

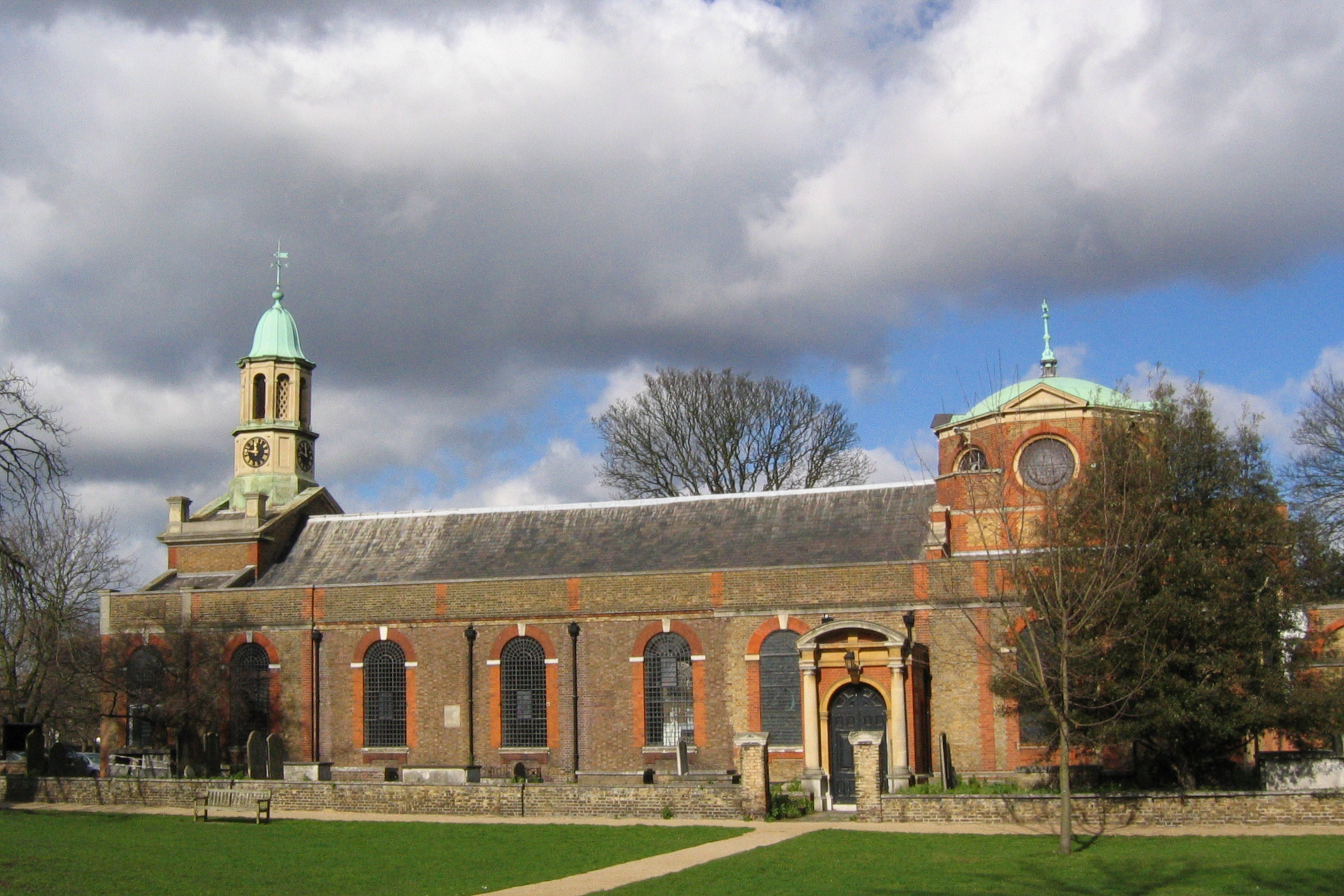
- Parish Church of St Anne

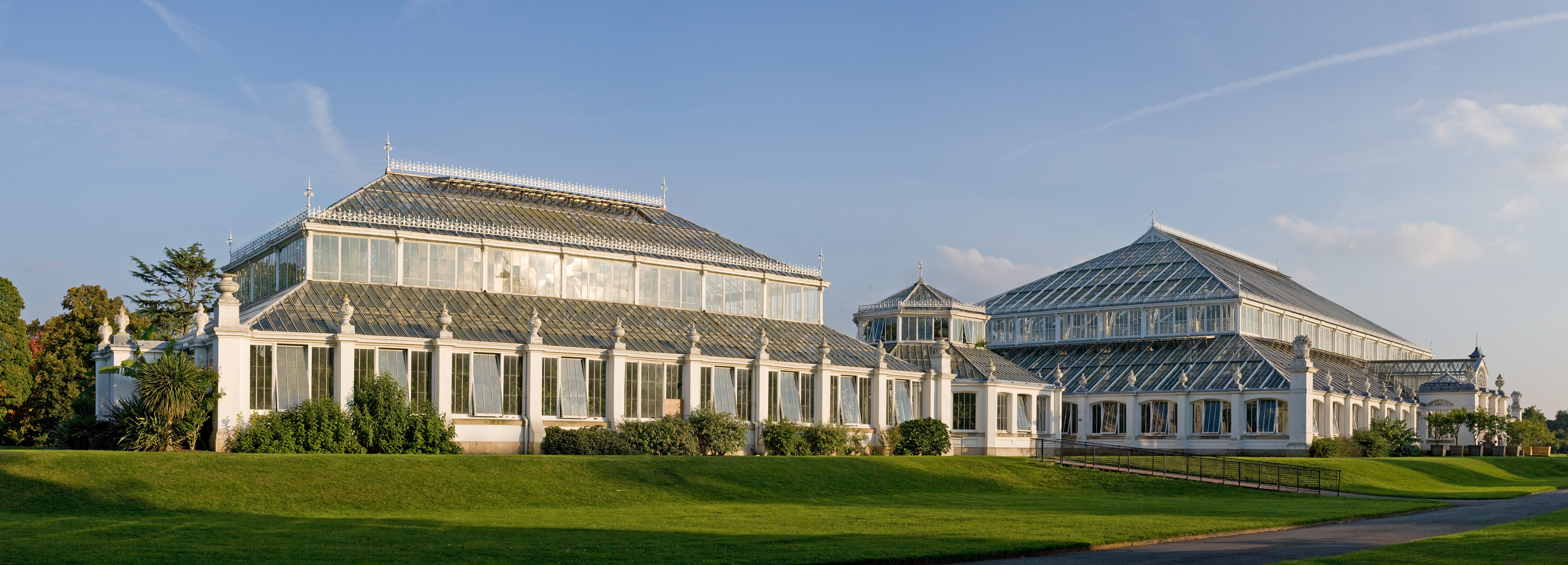
- Temperate House, Kew Gardens

- Location within Greater London
- Area: 3.30 km^{2} (1.27 sq mi)
- Population: 11,436 2011 Census (Kew ward 2011)
  - Density: 3,465/km^{2} (8,970/sq mi)
- OS grid reference: TQ195775
- London borough: Richmond
- Ceremonial county: Greater London
- Region: London
- Country: England
- Sovereign state: United Kingdom
- Post town: RICHMOND
- Postcode district: TW9
- Dialling code: 020
- Police: Metropolitan
- Fire: London
- Ambulance: London
- UK Parliament: Richmond Park
- London Assembly: South West

Kew (/kjuː/) is a district in the London Borough of Richmond upon Thames. Its population at the 2011 census was 11,436. Kew is the location of the Royal Botanic Gardens ("Kew Gardens"), now a World Heritage Site, which includes Kew Palace. Kew is also the home of important historical documents such as Domesday Book, which is held at The National Archives.

Julius Caesar may have forded the Thames at Kew in 54 BC during the Gallic Wars. Successive Tudor, Stuart and Georgian monarchs maintained links with Kew. During the French Revolution, many refugees established themselves there and it was the home of several artists in the 18th and 19th centuries.

Since 1965 Kew has incorporated the former area of North Sheen which includes St Philip and All Saints, the first barn church consecrated in England. It is now in a combined Church of England parish with St Luke's Church, Kew.

Today, Kew is an expensive residential area because of its prosperous suburban attributes. Among these are sports-and-leisure open spaces, schools, transport links, architecture, restaurants, no high-rise buildings, modest road sizes, trees and gardens. Most of Kew developed in the late 19th century, following the arrival of the District line of the London Underground. Further development took place in the 1920s and 1930s when new houses were built on the market gardens of North Sheen and in the first decade of the 21st century when considerably more river-fronting flats and houses were constructed by the Thames on land formerly owned by Thames Water.

== Etymology ==
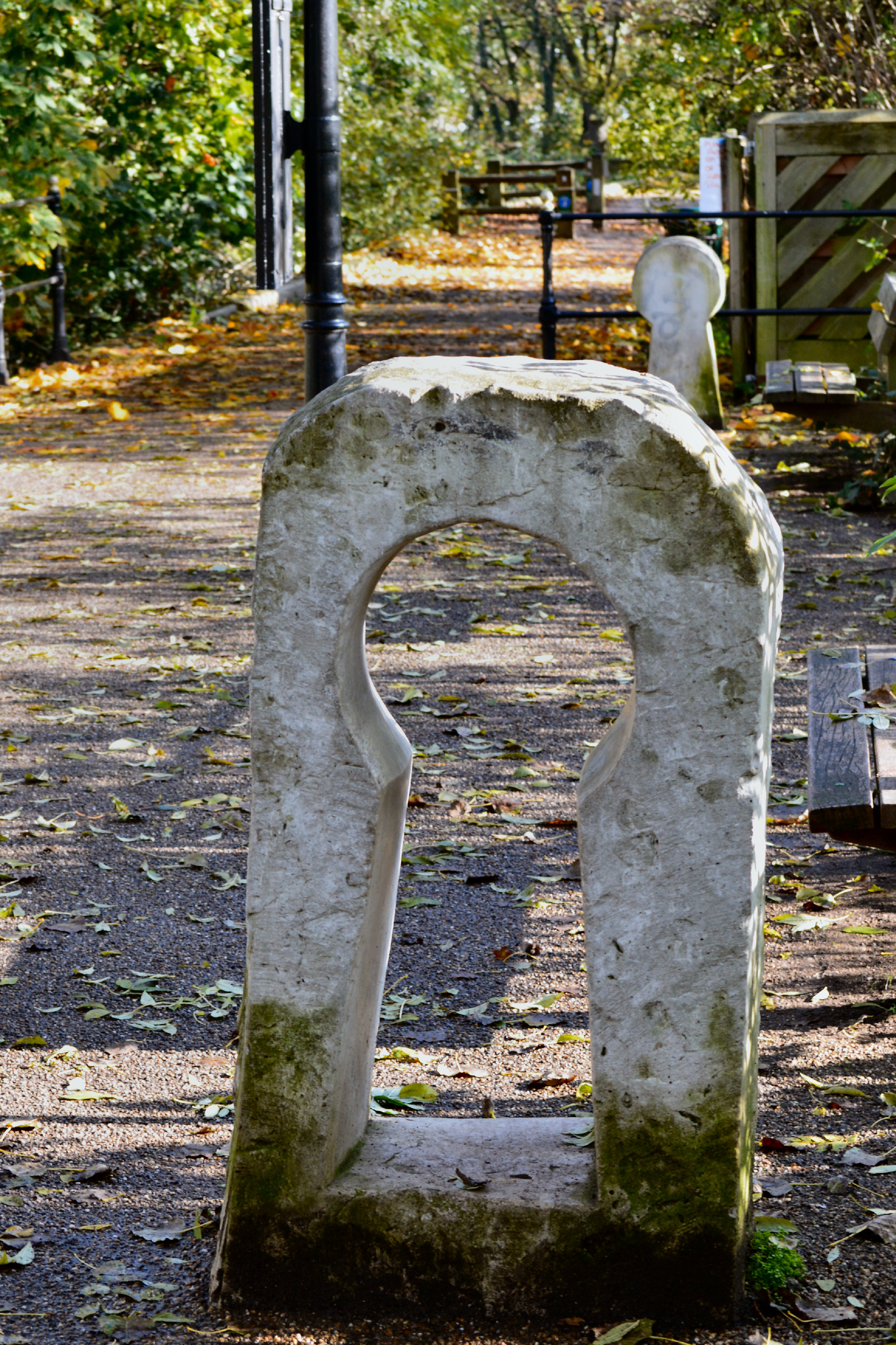
The sculpture Cayho by Mark Folds, on the towpath next to Kew Pier, is a play on words, with Kew's 14th-century name rendered as "keyhole".

The name Kew, recorded in 1327 as Cayho, is a combination of two words: the Old French kai (landing place; "quay" derives from this) and Old English hoh (spur of land). The land spur is formed by the bend in the Thames.

== Governance ==
Kew is one of 18 wards in the London Borough of Richmond upon Thames and has three local councillors, all of whom are Liberal Democrats and were elected in May 2026. It forms part of the Richmond Park constituency in the UK Parliament; the Member of Parliament is Sarah Olney of the Liberal Democrats. For elections to the London Assembly it is part of the South West London Assembly constituency, which is represented by Gareth Roberts of the Liberal Democrats.

Kew was added in 1892 to the Municipal Borough of Richmond which had been formed two years earlier and was in the county of Surrey. In 1965, under the London Government Act 1963, the Municipal Borough of Richmond was abolished. Kew, along with Richmond, was transferred from Surrey to the London Borough of Richmond upon Thames, one of 32 boroughs in the newly created Greater London.

On 1 April 1965 the civil parish was abolished. At the 1951 census (one of the last before the abolition of the parish), Kew had a population of 3202.

== Economy ==
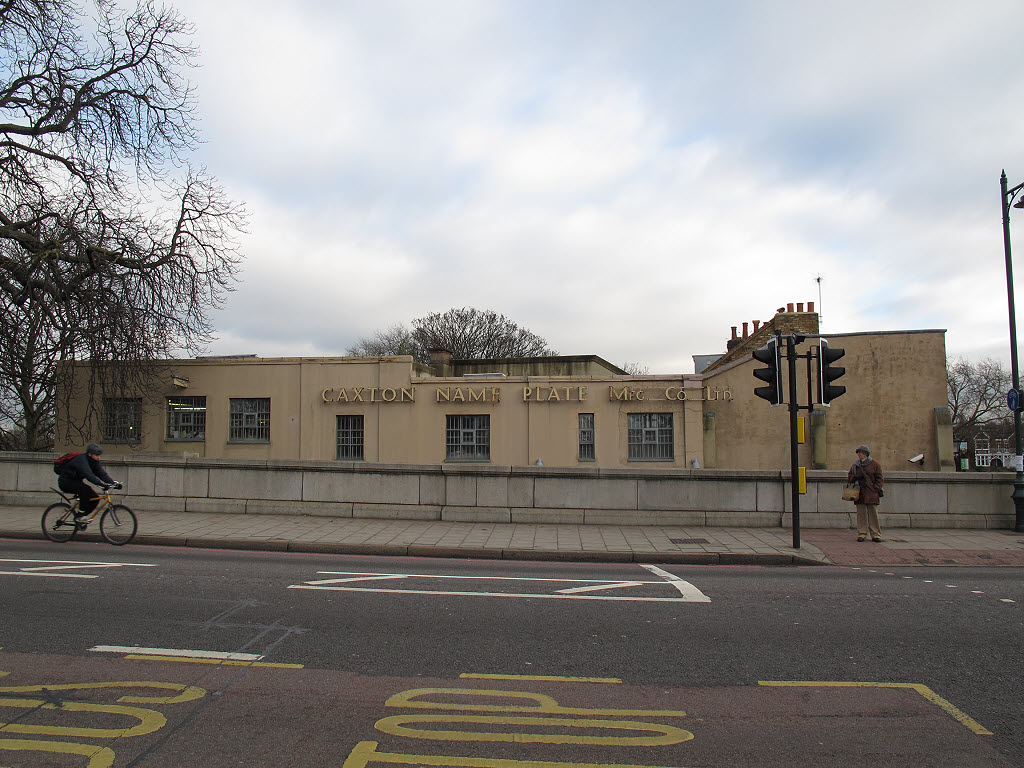
The Caxton Name Plate Manufacturing Company's former premises can still be identified from Kew Bridge, with its name on the building.

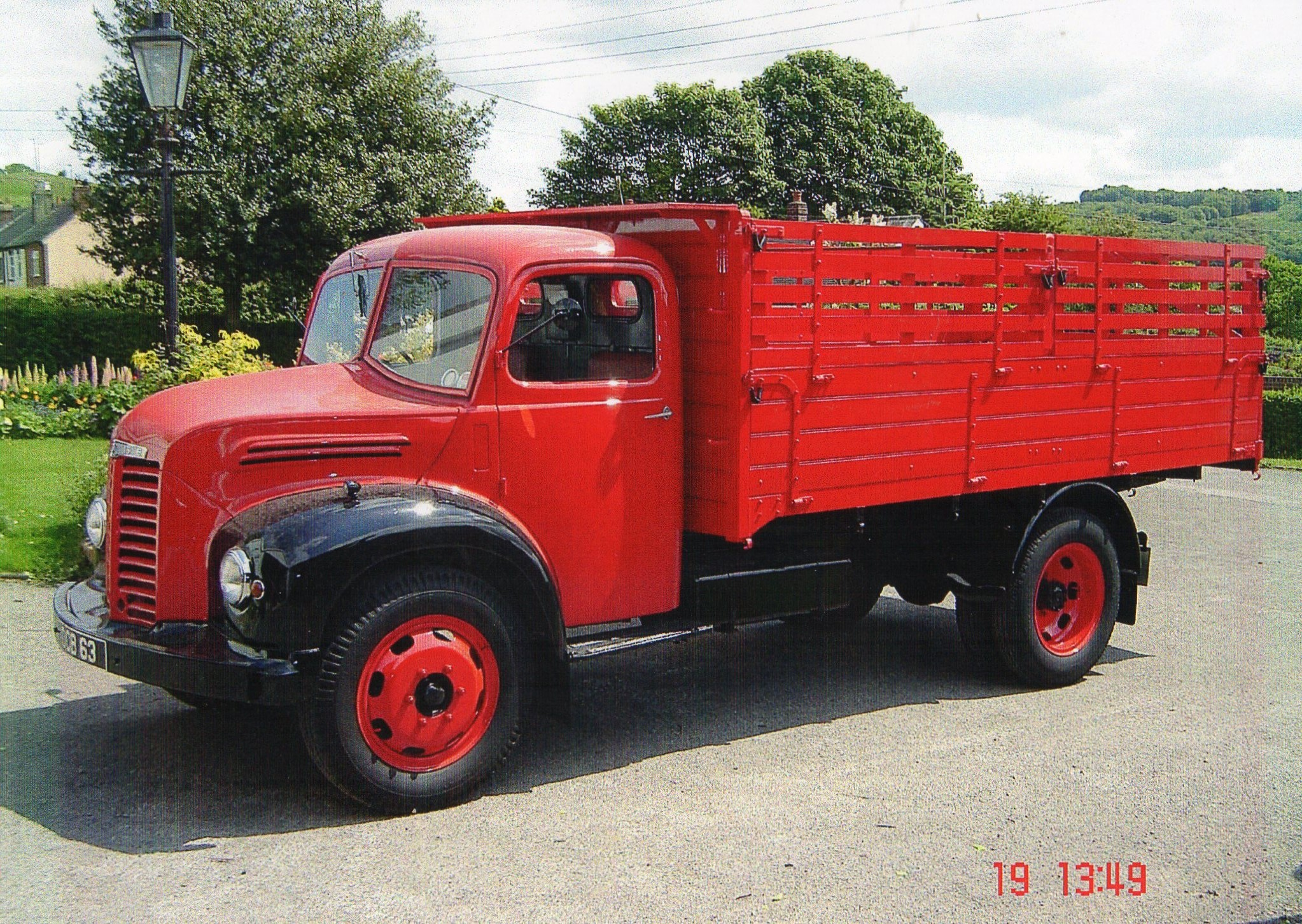
1954 Dodge Kew lorry

The Craft Guild of Chefs, the main professional association for chefs in the UK, is based in Kew. The fashion clothing retailer Jigsaw's headquarters, now at Water Lane, Richmond, were previously in Mortlake Road, Kew. A former industry in Kew was that of nameplate manufacturing, by the Caxton Name Plate Manufacturing Company, based on Kew Green. The company was founded in 1964 and folded in 1997. Boss & Co., a company that makes handcrafted guns, is now based at the building.

It was in Kew that viscose was first developed into rayon, in a laboratory near Kew Gardens station run by Cowey Engineering. Rayon was produced in a factory on South Avenue, off Sandycombe Road, before Courtaulds acquired the patents for rayon in 1904. Also on a site near Kew Gardens station, the engineering company F C Blake, now commemorated in the Kew street name Blake Mews, produced petrol-powered traction engines in the late 19th and early 20th centuries.

=== Chrysler and Dodge ===
Kew Retail Park stands on the site of a former aircraft factory established in 1918 by Harry Whitworth, who owned Glendower Aircraft Ltd. The factory built Airco DH.4s and Sopwith Salamanders for the British government in the First World War.

In 1923, the now-redundant aircraft factory was sold and it became a factory for road vehicles. From the 1920s until 1967, Dodge made lorries at this factory, with the model name Kew. Cars were also manufactured there. Dodge Brothers became a Chrysler subsidiary in 1928 and lorry production moved to Chrysler's car plant at Kew. In 1933 it began to manufacture a British chassis, at its works in Kew, using American engines and gearboxes. After Chrysler bought the Maxwell Motor Company and their Kew works, the cars of the lighter Chrysler range – Chryslers, De Sotos and Plymouths – were assembled at this Kew site until the Second World War. The various De Sotos models were named Richmond, Mortlake and Croydon; Plymouths were Kew Six and Wimbledon.

During the Second World War this Chrysler factory was part of the London Aircraft Production Group and built Handley Page Halifax aircraft assemblies. When wartime aircraft production ceased, the plant did not resume assembly of North American cars.

== People ==
=== Royal associations with Kew ===
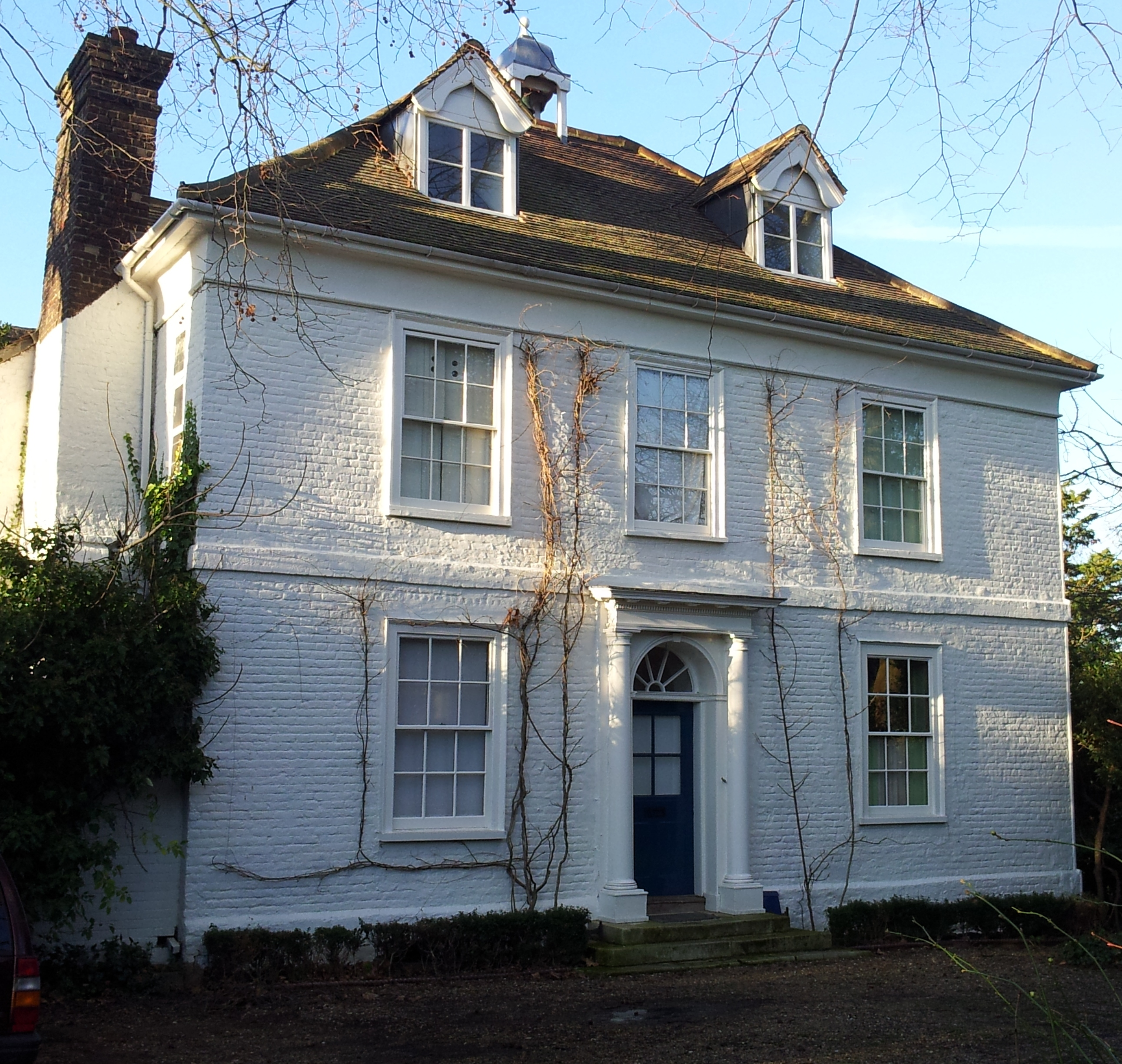
West Hall is Kew's only surviving 17th-century building apart from Kew Palace.

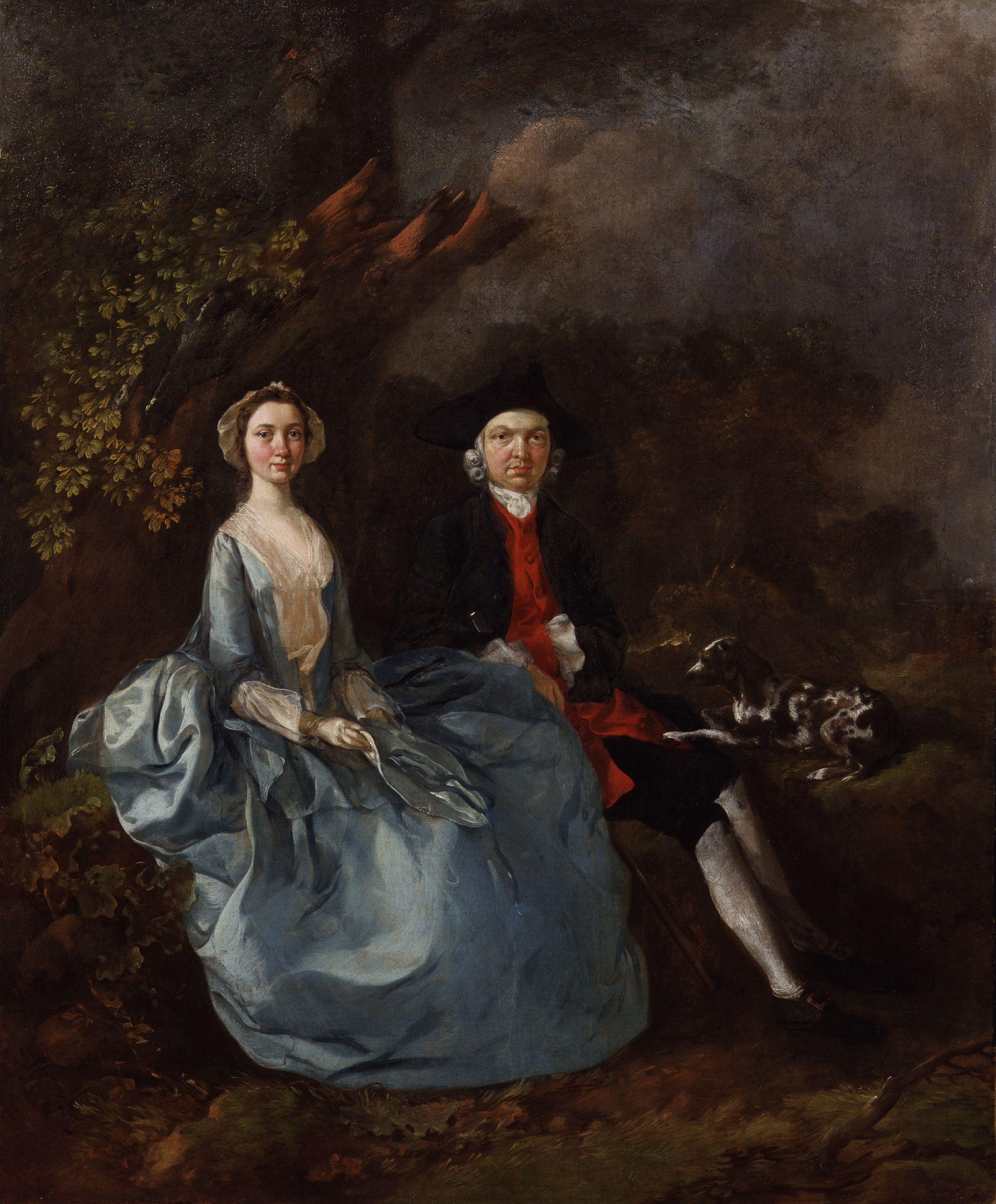
Sarah Kirby (née Bull) and Joshua Kirby by Thomas Gainsborough

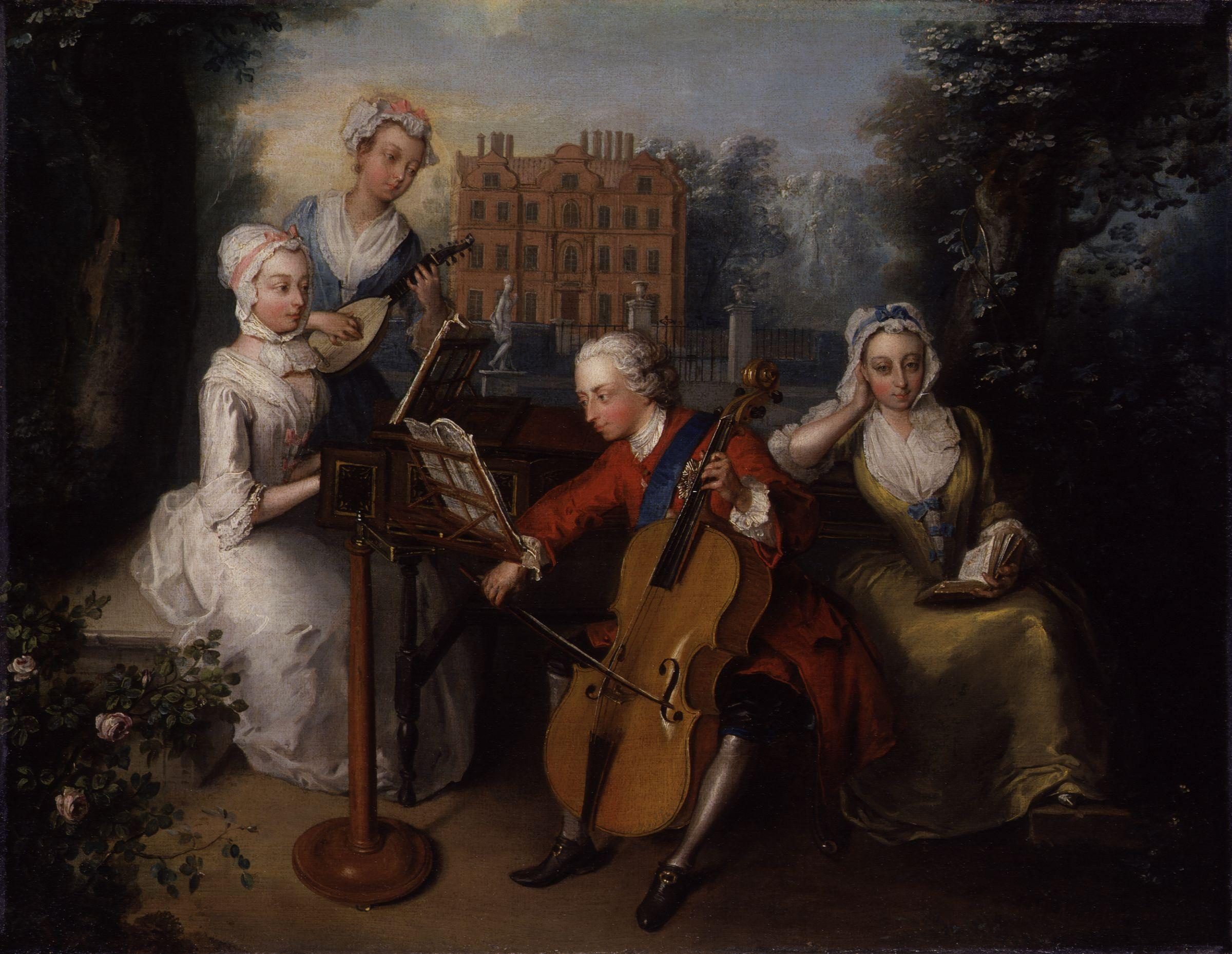
The Music Party by Philippe Mercier, dated 1733. A musical portrait of Frederick, Prince of Wales and his sisters uses the Dutch House, the present-day Kew Palace, as its plein-air backdrop.

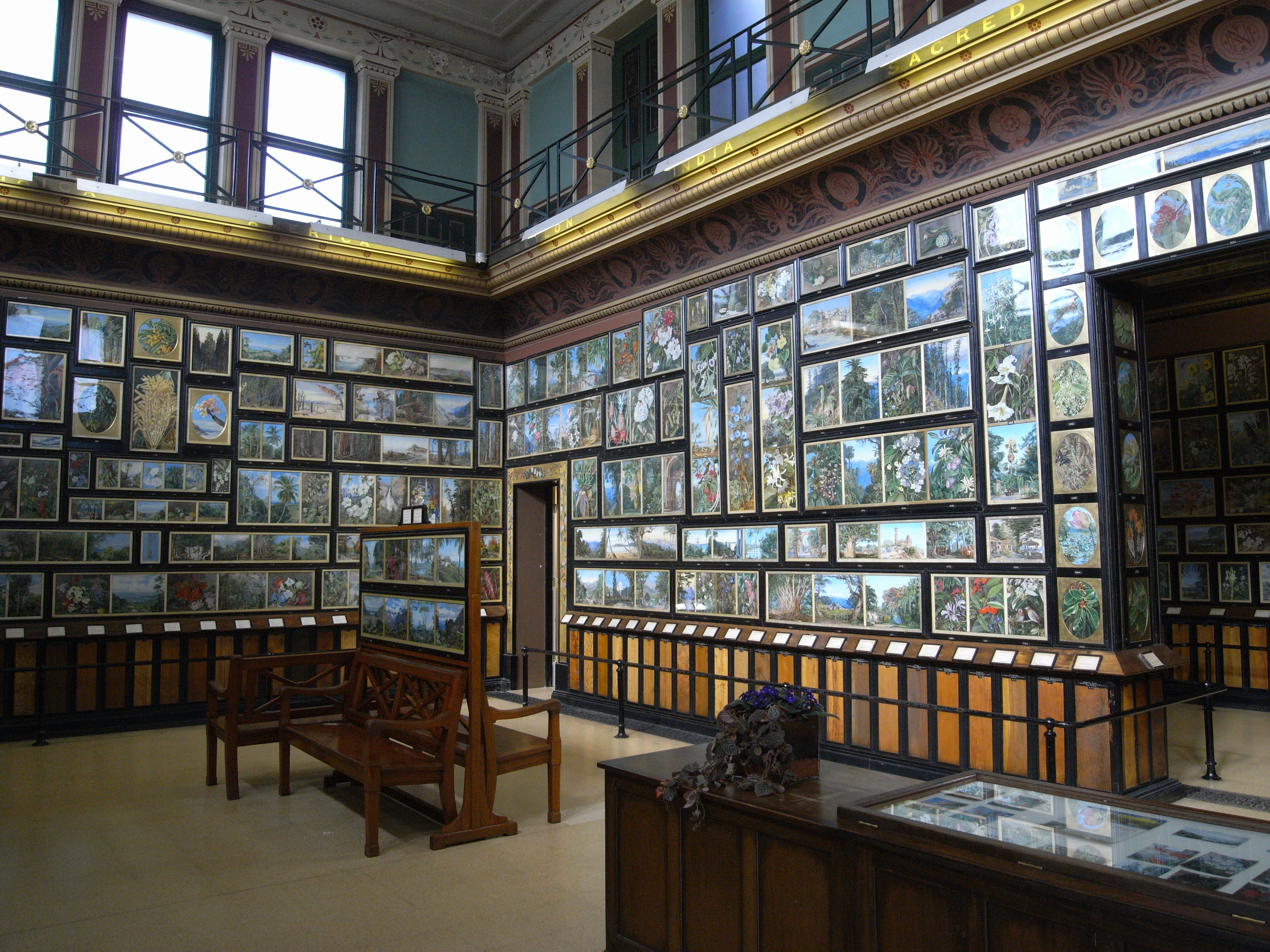
Interior of Marianne North Gallery, Kew Gardens

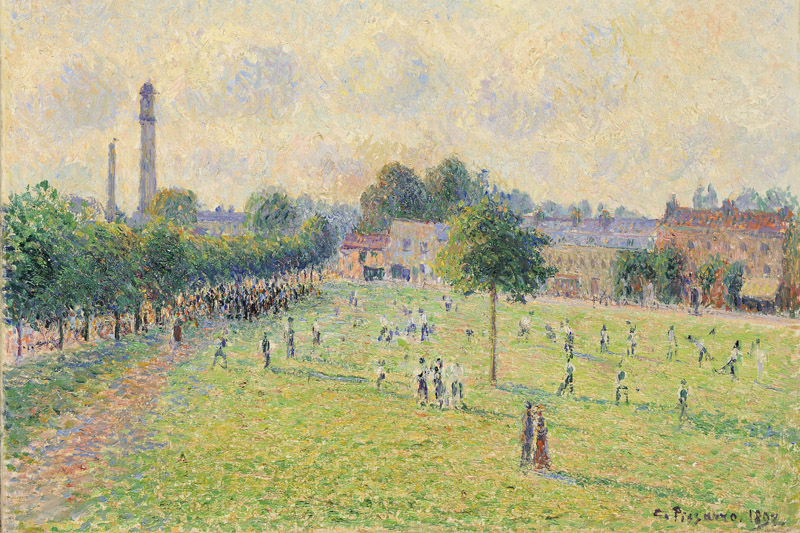
Kew Green. French painter Camille Pissarro's impression of Kew Green in 1892

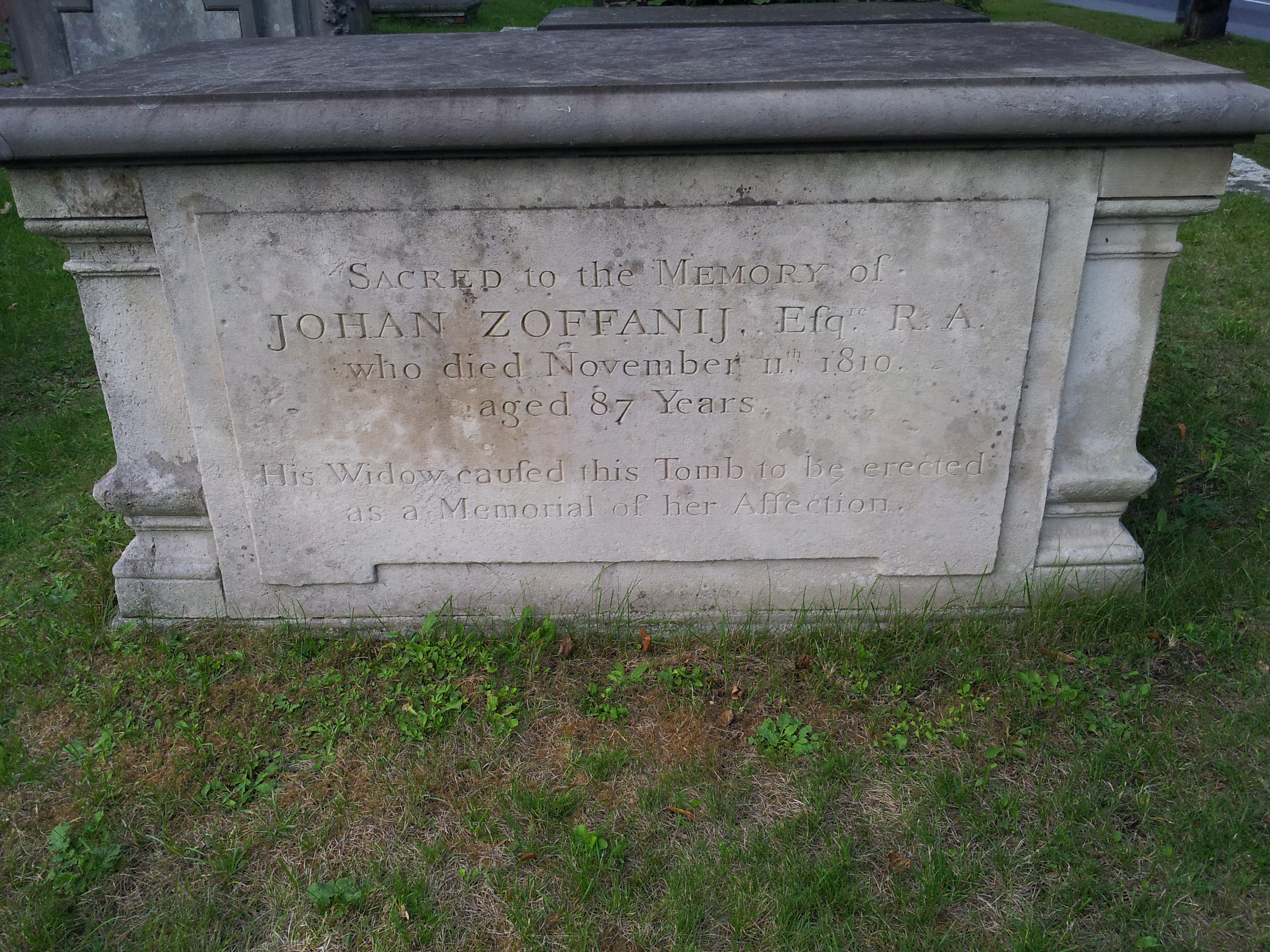
Tomb of the painter Johan Zoffany at St Anne's Church

==== The Tudors and Stuarts ====
Charles Somerset, 1st Earl of Worcester (c. 1460–1526) was granted lands at Kew in 1517. When he died in 1526 he left his Kew estates to his third wife, Eleanor, with the remainder to his son George. In 1538, Sir George Somerset sold the house for £200 to Thomas Cromwell (c. 1485–1540), who resold it for the same amount to Charles Brandon, 1st Duke of Suffolk (c. 1484–1545). Brandon had probably already inhabited Kew during the life of his wife Mary Tudor (1496–1533), daughter of Henry VII and widow of the French king Louis XII. According to John Leland's Cygnea Cantio ("Swan Song"), she stayed in Kew (which he refers to as "Cheva") for a time after her return to England.

One of Henry VIII's closest friends, Henry Norris (c. 1482–1536), lived at Kew Farm, which was later owned by Elizabeth I's favourite, Robert Dudley, Earl of Leicester (1532–1588). This large palatial house on the Thames riverbank predated the royal palaces of Kew Palace and the White House. Excavations at Kew Gardens in 2009 revealed a wall that may have belonged to the property.

In Elizabeth's reign, and under the Stuarts, houses were developed along Kew Green. West Hall, which survives in West Hall Road, dates from at least the 14th century and the present house was built at the end of the 17th century. Elizabeth Stuart (1596–1662), daughter of James I, later known as the "Winter Queen", was given a household at Kew in 1608. Queen Anne subscribed to the building of the parish church on Kew Green, which was dedicated to St Anne in 1714, three months before the queen's death.

==== The Hanoverians ====
The Hanoverians maintained the strongest links with Kew, in particular Princess Augusta (1719–1772) who founded the botanic gardens and her husband Frederick, Prince of Wales (1707–1751) who lived at the White House in Kew. Augusta, as Dowager Princess of Wales, continued to live there until her death in 1772. Frederick commissioned the building of the first substantial greenhouse at Kew Gardens.

In 1772 King George III and Queen Charlotte moved into the White House at Kew. Charlotte died at the Dutch House (now Kew Palace) in 1818. Their son, King William IV, spent most of his early life at Richmond and at Kew Palace, where he was educated by private tutors.

=== Georgian expansion ===
During the French Revolution, many refugees established themselves in Kew, having built many of the houses of this period. In the 1760s and 1770s the presence of royalty attracted artists such as Thomas Gainsborough and Johann Zoffany.

=== Artists associated with Kew ===
- Diana Armfield (born 1920) lives in Kew. She is known for landscapes, and has also painted portraits, literary subjects and still lifes. She has a particular interest in flower paintings, and is considered to owe much to the tradition of Walter Sickert.
- Margaret Backhouse (1818–1896) was a successful British portrait and genre painter during the 19th century who lived at Lichfield Villas, near the botanic gardens' Victoria Gate.
- Franz (later Francis) Bauer (1758–1840) was an Austrian microscopist and botanical artist who became the first botanical illustrator at Kew Gardens. By 1790 he had settled at Kew, where as well as making detailed paintings and drawings of flower dissections, often at microscopic level, he tutored Queen Charlotte, her daughter Princess Elizabeth and William Hooker in the art of illustration, and often entertained friends and botanists at his home. He is buried at St Anne's, next to Thomas Gainsborough.
- The artist Walter Deverell (1827–1854), who was associated with the Pre-Raphaelite Brotherhood, lived at 352 Kew Road, then called Heathfield House. He had a studio at the end of the garden where there are now garages. In this setting he painted A Pet (1853).
- Bernard Dunstan (1920–2017) lived in Kew. He was an artist, teacher and author, best known for his studies of figures in interiors and landscapes. At the time of his death, he was the longest serving Royal Academician.
- George Engleheart (1750–1829), one of the greatest English painters of portrait miniatures, was born in Kew.
- Walter Hood Fitch (1817–1892), botanical illustrator, lived on Kew Green.
- Thomas Gainsborough (1727–1788), who is considered one of the most important British artists of the second half of the 18th century, visited Kew many times, staying with his friend Joshua Kirby and, after Kirby's death, in a house probably rented by his daughter close to St Anne's Church, where he is buried.
- Arthur Hughes (1832–1915), Pre-Raphaelite painter, lived and died at Eastside House, 22 Kew Green. The site is marked by a blue plaque. Hughes is buried in Richmond Cemetery.
- Tom Keating (1917–1984), artist, art restorer and art forger, lived in Kew from 1961 to 1967. He was best known for his highly publicised crusade against the art world, his trial for art fraud at the Old Bailey, and his critically acclaimed Channel 4 television series Tom Keating On Painters.
- Joshua Kirby (1716–1774) was a landscape painter, engraver, and writer, whose main artistic focus was "linear perspective", based on the ideas of English mathematician Brook Taylor. He was the son of topographer John Kirby, and the father of the writer Sarah Trimmer and the entomologist William Kirby. In 1760 he moved to Kew, where he taught linear perspective to George III. He was a Fellow of the Royal Society. He and his wife are buried in the churchyard of St Anne's.
- Sir Peter Lely (1618–1680), portrait painter, had a house on the north side of Kew Green. On almost exactly the same site, Jeremiah Meyer (1735–1789), miniaturist to Queen Charlotte and George III, built a house a century later. Meyer is buried at St Anne's.
- Charles Mozley (1914–1991), artist and art teacher, lived and died at 358 Kew Road, Kew.
- Victorian artist Marianne North (1830–1890) did not live in Kew, but she left to Kew Gardens her collection of botanic art that she had painted on her extensive overseas travels, and funded a gallery – the Marianne North Gallery – to house them.
- French Impressionist painter Camille Pissarro (1830–1903) stayed in 1892 at 10 Kew Green, on the corner of Gloucester Road, now marked by a blue plaque. During his stay he painted Kew Gardens – Path to the Great Glasshouse (1892), Kew Green (1892) and Church at Kew (1892). His third son, Félix Pissarro (1874–1897), painter, etcher and caricaturist, died in a sanatorium at 262 Kew Road in 1897.
- Charles Shannon (1863–1937), artist best known for his portraits, died in Kew at 21 Kew Gardens Road.
- Matilda Smith (1854–1926), the first official botanical artist of the Royal Botanic Gardens, lived at Gloucester Road, Kew.
- George Tinworth (1843–1913), ceramic artist who worked for the Doulton factory at Lambeth from 1867 until his death, lived at 8 Maze Road.
- The painter Johan Zoffany (1725–1810), who lived at Strand-on-the-Green, is buried in St Anne's churchyard.

=== Botanists who have lived in Kew ===
Unsurprisingly, many botanists have lived in Kew, near the botanic gardens:

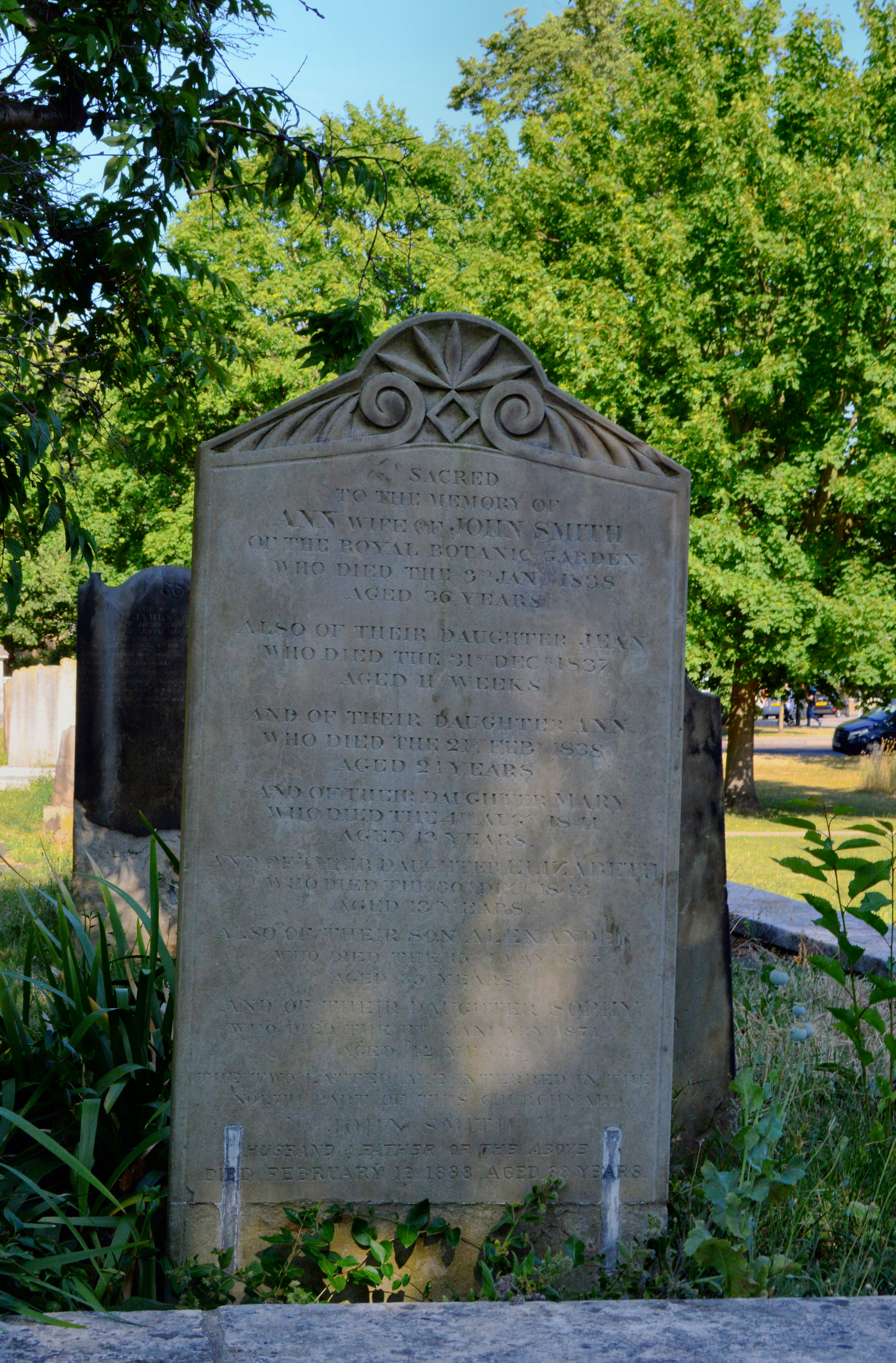
Grave of John Smith and his family in the churchyard at St Anne's

- William Aiton (1731–1793), botanist, was appointed director in 1759 of the newly established botanical garden at Kew, where he remained until his death. He effected many improvements at the gardens, and in 1789 he published Hortus Kewensis, a catalogue of the plants cultivated there. When he died, he was succeeded as director at Kew Gardens by his son William Townsend Aiton (1766–1849), who was also a botanist, and was born in Kew. William Townsend Aiton was one of the founders of the Royal Horticultural Society. He retired in 1841 but remained living at Kew, although passing much of his time with his brother at Kensington where he died in 1849. Both father and son lived at Descanso House on Kew Green and are buried in St Anne's churchyard where the substantial family tomb is a prominent feature. Inside the church there is also a memorial to them.
- John Patrick Micklethwait Brenan (1917–1985), director of the botanic gardens, lived in Kew and died there on 26 September 1985. He is buried at St. Anne's.
- Sir William Hooker (1785–1865) and his son Sir Joseph Hooker (1817–1911), botanists and directors of Kew Gardens, lived at 49 Kew Green, Kew; the site is marked by a blue plaque. They are both buried at St Anne's Church.
- John Hutchinson (1884–1972), botanist, lived on Kew Green, near Kew Gardens' Herbarium, during the Second World War.
- Daniel Oliver (1830–1916), Professor of Botany at University College London 1861–88 and Keeper of Kew Gardens' Herbarium 1864–90, lived on Kew Green.
- Henry Nicholas Ridley (1855–1956), botanist, geologist and naturalist, died at his home in Kew.
- John Smith (1798–1888), botanist, the first curator at Kew Gardens, lived on Kew Green. He died at Park House, Kew Road, and is buried in St Anne's churchyard.
- William T Stearn (1911–2001), botanist, who was president of the Linnean Society, lived in Kew.
- John Stuart, 3rd Earl of Bute (1713–1792), botanist and honorary director of Kew Gardens 1754–72, adviser to Princess Augusta and tutor to George III and, later, Prime Minister of Great Britain 1762–63, lived at King's Cottage, 33 Kew Green.

=== Other notable inhabitants ===
==== Historical figures ====
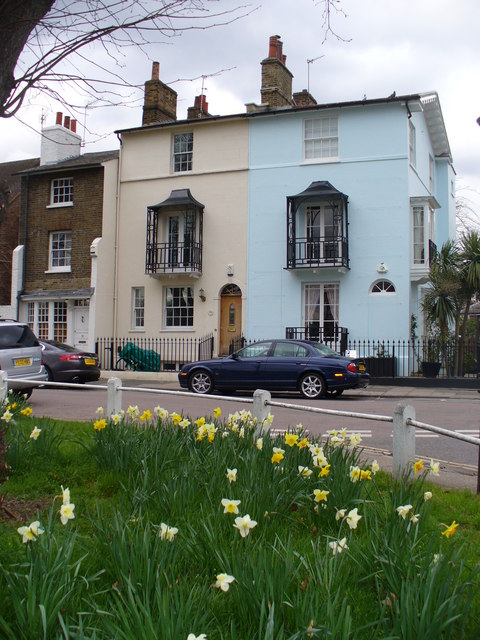
Cottages on Kew Green

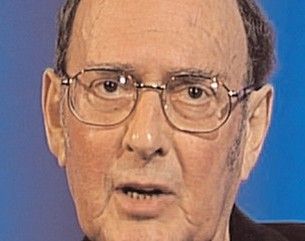
Playwright Harold Pinter lived in Kew.

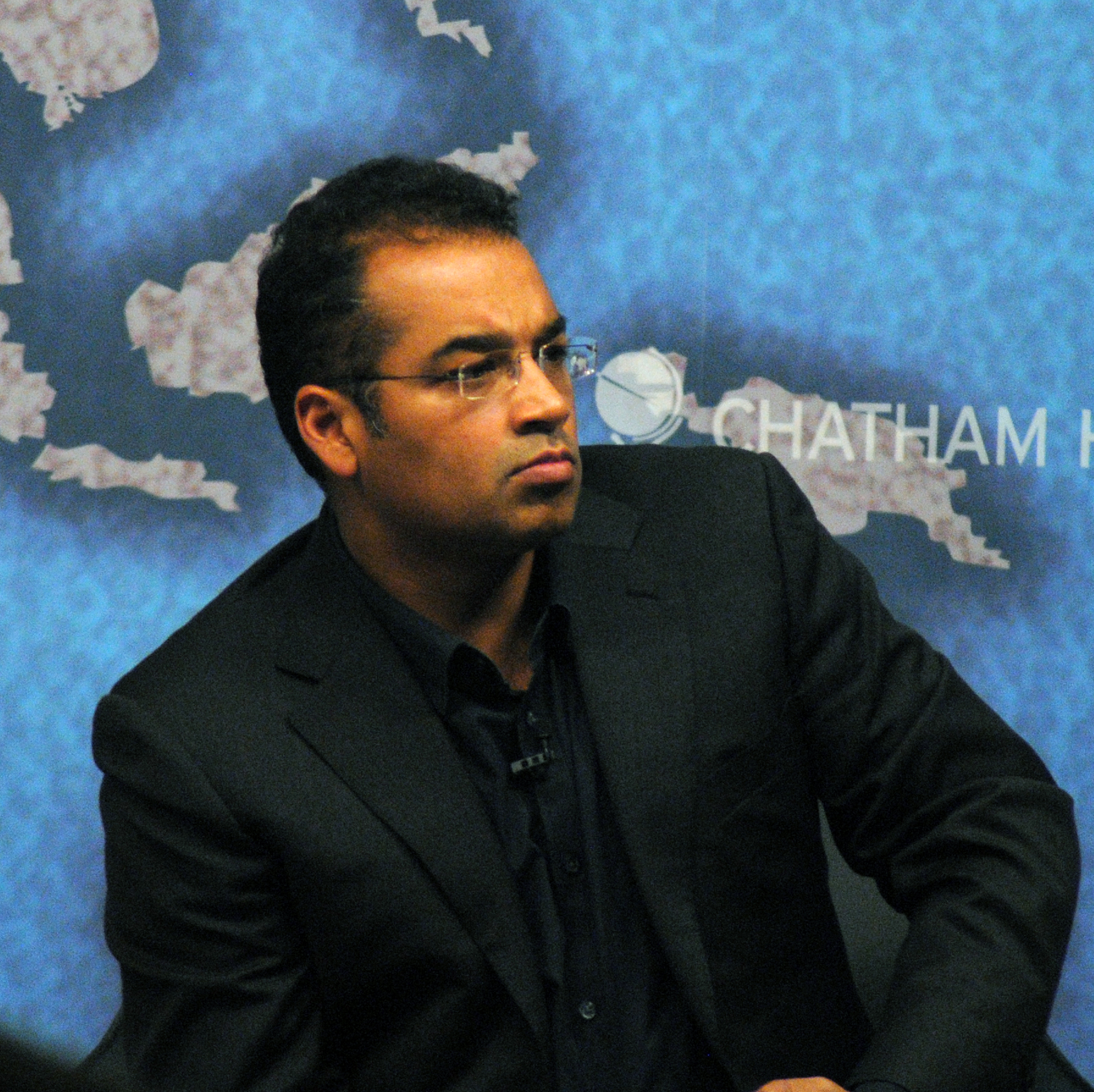
Krishnan Guru-Murthy lives in Kew.

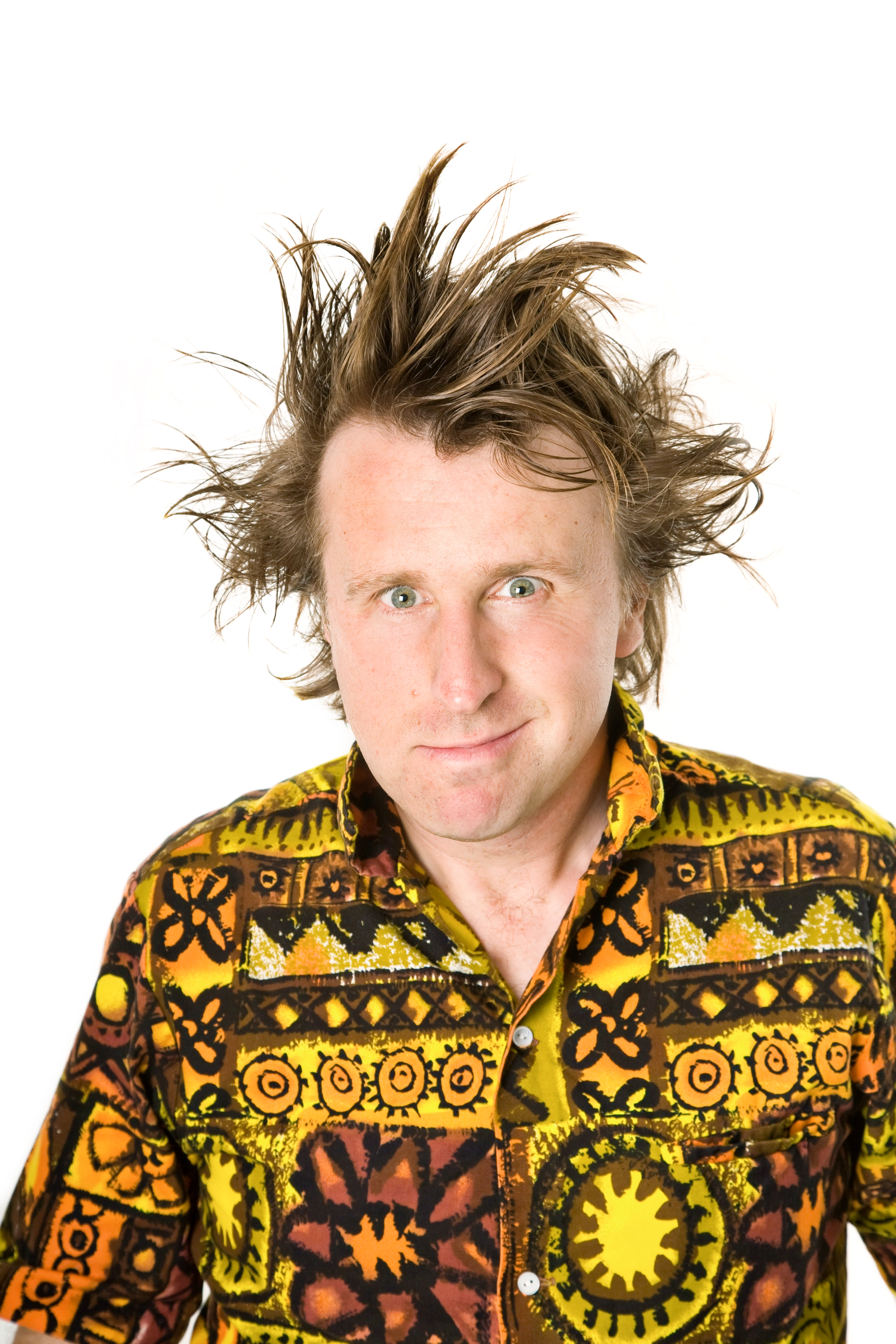
Comedian Milton Jones was brought up in Kew.

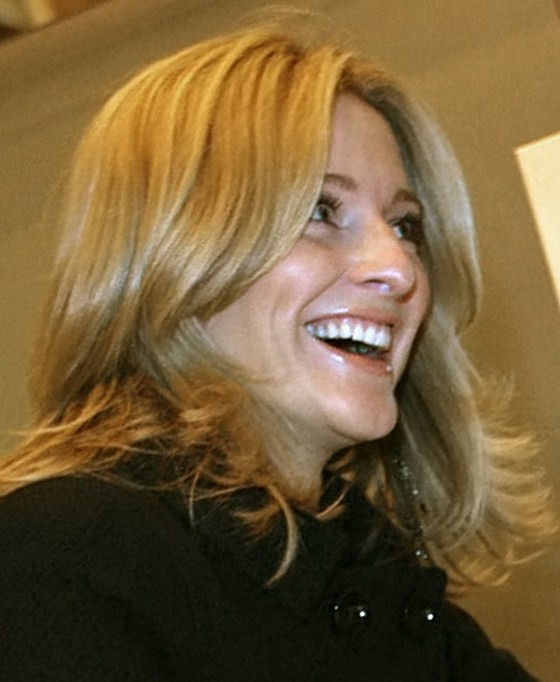
TV presenter and former international gymnast Gabby Logan lives in Kew.

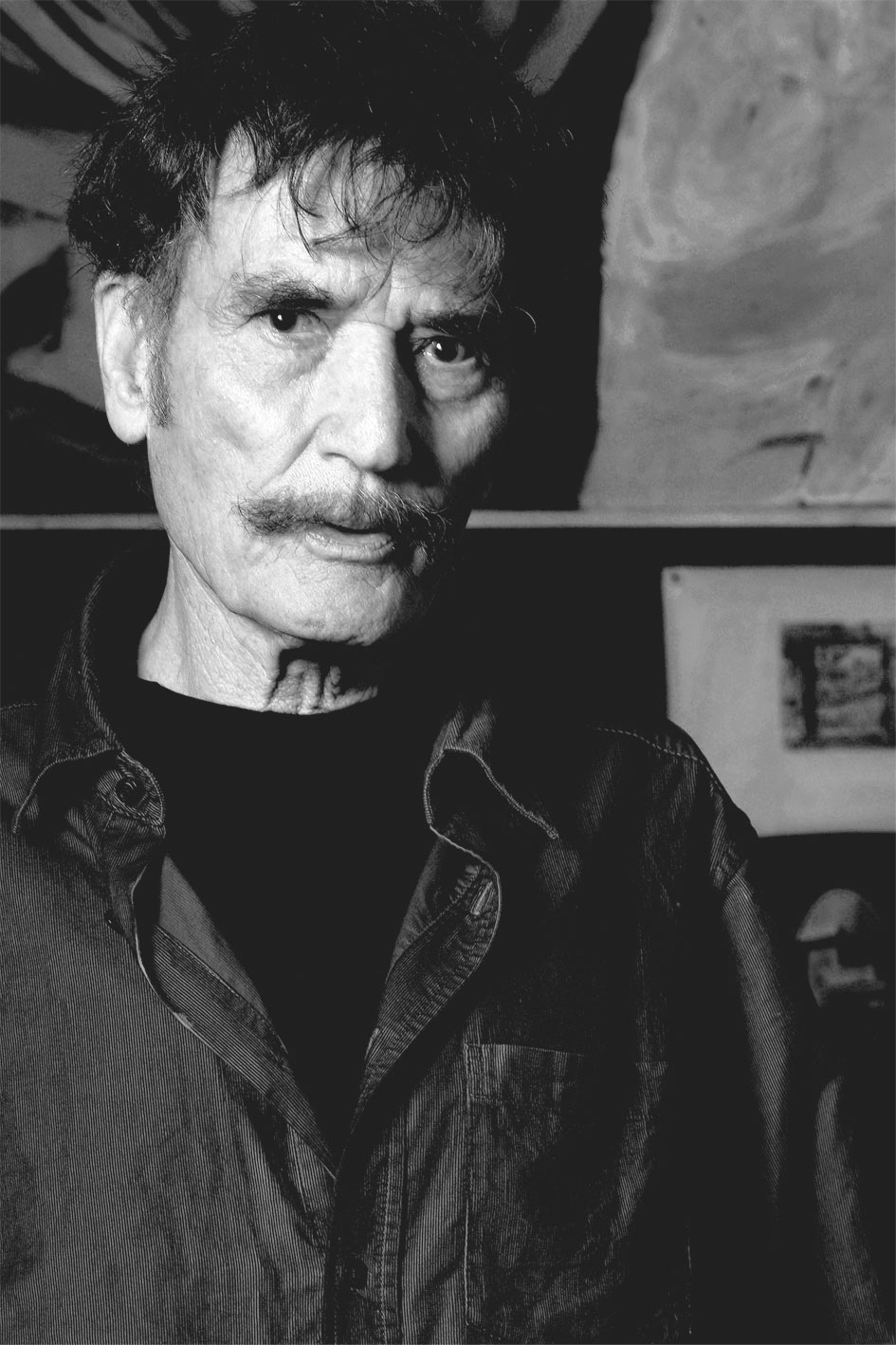
A. C. H. Smith, novelist and playwright, photographed in 2011 by Stephen Morris, was born in Kew.

- Francis Claude Blake (1867–1954), engineer, lived at 13 Kew Gardens Road.
- David Blomfield (1934–2016), leader of the Liberal Party group on Richmond upon Thames Council, writer, book editor and local historian, lived in Kew. He is buried in Richmond Cemetery.
- Ferruccio Bonavia (1877–1950), violinist, composer and music critic, lived at 352 Kew Road, Kew from 1914 until 1919.
- Tony Bradshaw (1926–2008), evolutionary ecologist, was born in Kew.
- Ray Brooks (1939–2025), television and film actor, lived in Kew.
- Aggrey Burke (1943–2025), psychiatrist and academic, who was born in Jamaica, spent the majority of his medical career at St George's Hospital in London, specialising in transcultural psychiatry and writing literature on changing attitudes towards black people and mental health. In 1959, while still a teenager, he moved to Britain with his parents. The family settled in Kew, where Burke was schooled and was the only black child in his class.
- Sir Arthur Herbert Church (1834–1915), chemist, who was an expert on pottery, stones and the chemistry of paintings, lived and died at Shelsley, a detached house at 21 Ennerdale Road, Kew. The house has since been demolished and the site is now occupied by Voltaire, a Modernist block of flats designed by Vivien Pilley (A V Pilichowski).
- Richard Cook (1957–2007), jazz writer, magazine editor and former record company executive, was born in Kew.
- Stephen Duck (c. 1705–1756), poet, lived in Kew.
- Prince Friso of Orange-Nassau (1968–2013), brother of King Willem-Alexander of the Netherlands, lived in Kew with his wife Princess Mabel of Orange-Nassau (born 1968).
- Liberal Party leader Jo Grimond (1913–1993) lived on Kew Green.
- Susanne Groom (1945–2023), historian, author and curator at Historic Royal Palaces, lived on High Park Road in Kew.
- John Haverfield Sr (1694–1784), surveyor, gardener and landscape architect, lived on Kew Green where he had a house built c. 1750, which was known as Haverfield House.
- John Haverfield (1744–1820), gardener and landscape architect, was born at Haverfield House on Kew Green, the son of John Haverfield Sr and Ann Drew.
- Reginald Hawthorn Hooker (1867–1944), civil servant, statistician and meteorologist, was born in Kew.
- John Huntley (1921–2003), film historian, educator and archivist, was born in Kew.
- Sir Donald Insall (1926–2026), architect, conservationist and author, lived in Kew.
- Elinor May Jenkins (1893–1920), war poet, and her brother Arthur Lewis Jenkins (1892–1917), soldier, pilot and war poet, who are buried next to each other in Richmond Cemetery, lived at the family home at Sussex House, 220 Kew Road. The house has been demolished and its name has been given to a block of flats that has been built on the site.
- Cosmo Lang (1864–1945), Archbishop of Canterbury, lived at 33 Kew Green.
- Serge Lourie (1946–2024), former Leader of Richmond upon Thames Council, and councillor for Kew for 28 years, lived at Burlington Avenue in Kew.
- Alfred Luff (1846–1933), cricketer, who made three first-class appearances for Surrey in 1867, was born in Kew.
- Phil Lynott (1949–1986), guitarist, songwriter, vocalist and leader of the Irish rock band Thin Lizzy, lived in Kew.
- Andrew Millar (1705–1768), Scottish bookseller and publisher, owned a country home on Kew Green and died there in 1768.
- Samuel Molyneux (1689–1728), Member of Parliament and an amateur astronomer, who was married to Lady Elizabeth Diana Capel, the eldest daughter of Algernon Capell, 2nd Earl of Essex, inherited Kew House on the death of Lady Capel of Tewkesbury. Molyneux set up an observatory at the house and collaborated there with James Bradley in innovative designs for reflecting telescopes. Kew House which later, as the White House, became the home of Prince Frederick and Princess Augusta, was pulled down in 1802 when George II's short-lived gothic "castellated palace" was built.
- Desmond Morton (1891–1971), soldier, intelligence officer and personal assistant to Winston Churchill 1940–45, lived at 22 Kew Green 1952–71.
- Conrad Noel (1869–1942), Church of England priest and prominent Christian socialist, was born in Royal Cottage, Kew Green.
- Harold Pinter (1930–2008), playwright, dramatist, actor, director and Nobel Prize laureate, lived from 1960 to 1963 at Fairmead Court, Taylor Avenue, Kew where he wrote his 1961 play The Collection.
- George Pither (1899–1966), professional footballer, was born in Kew.
- Sir Hugh Portman, 4th Baronet (died 1632), MP for Taunton, lived in a house opposite Kew Palace.
- Admiral Sir Henry Prescott (1783– 1874), Royal Navy officer who served during the French Revolutionary and Napoleonic Wars, and was later (1834–1841) the Governor of the Newfoundland Colony, was born in Kew.
- Sir John Puckering (1544–1596), lawyer, politician, Speaker of the English House of Commons, and Lord Keeper from 1592 until his death, lived in Kew.
- Anthony Saxton (1934–2015), advertising executive and headhunter, lived at 3 Mortlake Road in Kew, and was a churchwarden of St Anne's Church, Kew.
- Harry Scandrett (1892–1977), flying ace credited with seven aerial victories during the First World War, was born in Kew.
- Clementina Jacobina Sobieski Schnell (1760–1842), lived for 53 years at the Little Red House on Kew Green. She was related to Flora MacDonald. Her husband, Francis Schnell, was tutor to Ernest Augustus, Duke of Cumberland. She died in 1842 when her headdress caught fire.
- Sarah Trimmer (née Kirby; 1741–1810), writer and critic of 18th-century British children's literature, and educational reformer, lived in Kew before her marriage.
- Patrick Troughton (1921–1987), actor, most famous for playing the Second Doctor in the TV series Doctor Who, lived in Kew.
- Robert Tunstall (c 1759–1833) from Brentford, who built the second stone Kew Bridge, died at a house on Kew Green.
- George Vassila (1857–1915), cricketer, was born in Kew.
- Andrew Watson (1856–1921), the world's first black person to play association football at international level, retired to London in around 1910 and died of pneumonia at 88 Forest Road, Kew in 1921. He is buried in Richmond Cemetery.
- Iolo Williams (1890–1962), author, journalist and Liberal Party politician, lived at West Hall, Kew from the 1940s until his death in 1962.

==== Living people ====
- Geoffrey Archer, fiction writer and former Defence Correspondent of ITN, lives on Kew Green.
- Mick Avory, musician and former drummer with The Kinks, lives in Kew.
- Nick Baird, former group corporate affairs director of energy firm Centrica, lives in Kew.
- Marie-Elsa Bragg, writer, Anglican priest and therapist, lived in Kew as a young child.
- Melvyn Bragg, Baron Bragg, broadcaster and author, lived in Kew when he was married to his first wife, Marie-Elisabeth Roche.
- Justin Lee Collins, comedian and television presenter, lives in Kew.
- Sir David Durie, former civil servant and Governor of Gibraltar, lives in Kew.
- Simon Fowler, social historian and author, lives in Kew.
- Giles Fraser, vicar of St Anne's Church, Kew, bought a house in Kew in 2023.
- Ruth Gledhill, assistant editor, home and digital, of The Tablet and a former religion affairs correspondent for The Times, and her husband, the writer and musician Alan Franks, live in Kew.
- Krishnan Guru-Murthy, lead presenter of Channel 4 News, lives in Kew.
- Milton Jones, comedian, was brought up in Kew.
- Gabby Logan, TV presenter, and her husband Kenny Logan, rugby player, live in Kew.
- Steven McRae, principal dancer with the Royal Ballet, lives in Kew.
- Paul Ormerod, economist, has lived in Kew.
- Helen Sharman, the first British woman in space, lives in Kew.
- A. C. H. Smith, novelist and playwright, was born in Kew.
- Jenny Tonge, Baroness Tonge, former MP for Richmond Park, and a councillor for Kew for nine years, lives in Kew.

== Demography ==
In the ten years from the time of the 2001 census, the population rose from 9,445 to 11,436, the sharpest ten-year increase in Kew since the early 20th century. This was partly accounted for by the conversion of former Thames Water land to residential use, and increases in property sizes. The figures are based on those for Kew ward, the boundaries of the enlarged parish having been adjusted to allow for all wards in the borough to be equally sized.

=== Homes and households ===
2011 Census homes
Ward	Detached	Semi-detached	Terraced	Flats and apartments	Caravans/temporary/ mobile homes/houseboats	Shared between households
Kew	426	1,029	1,212	2,268	4	25

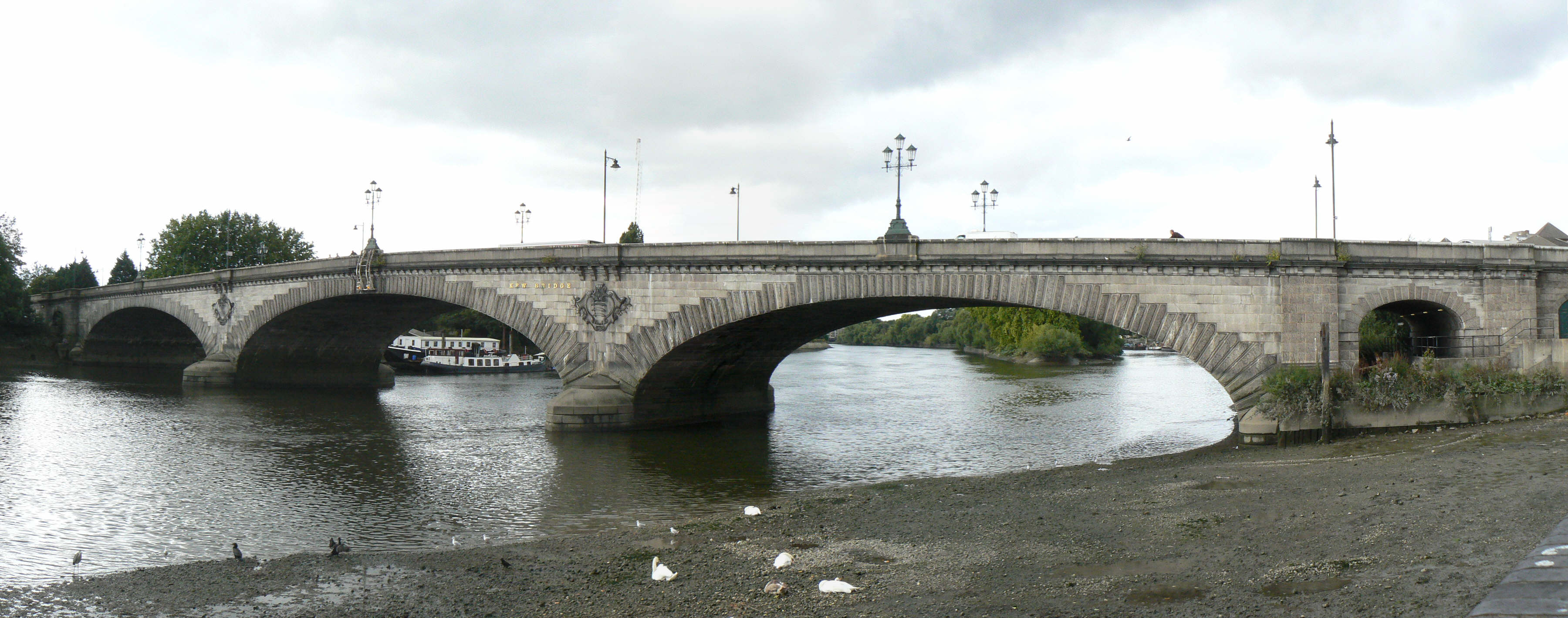
Kew Bridge

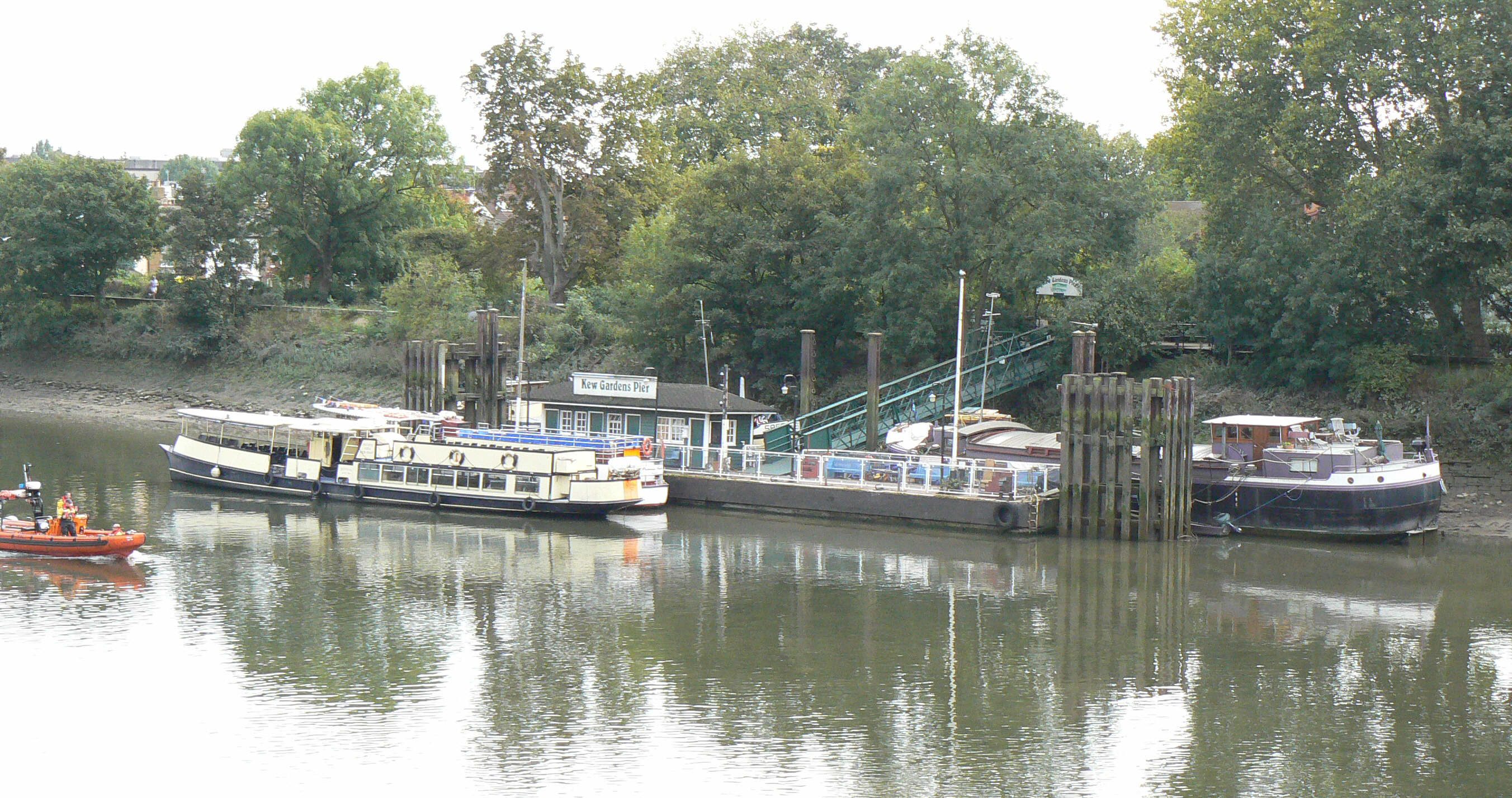
Kew Pier

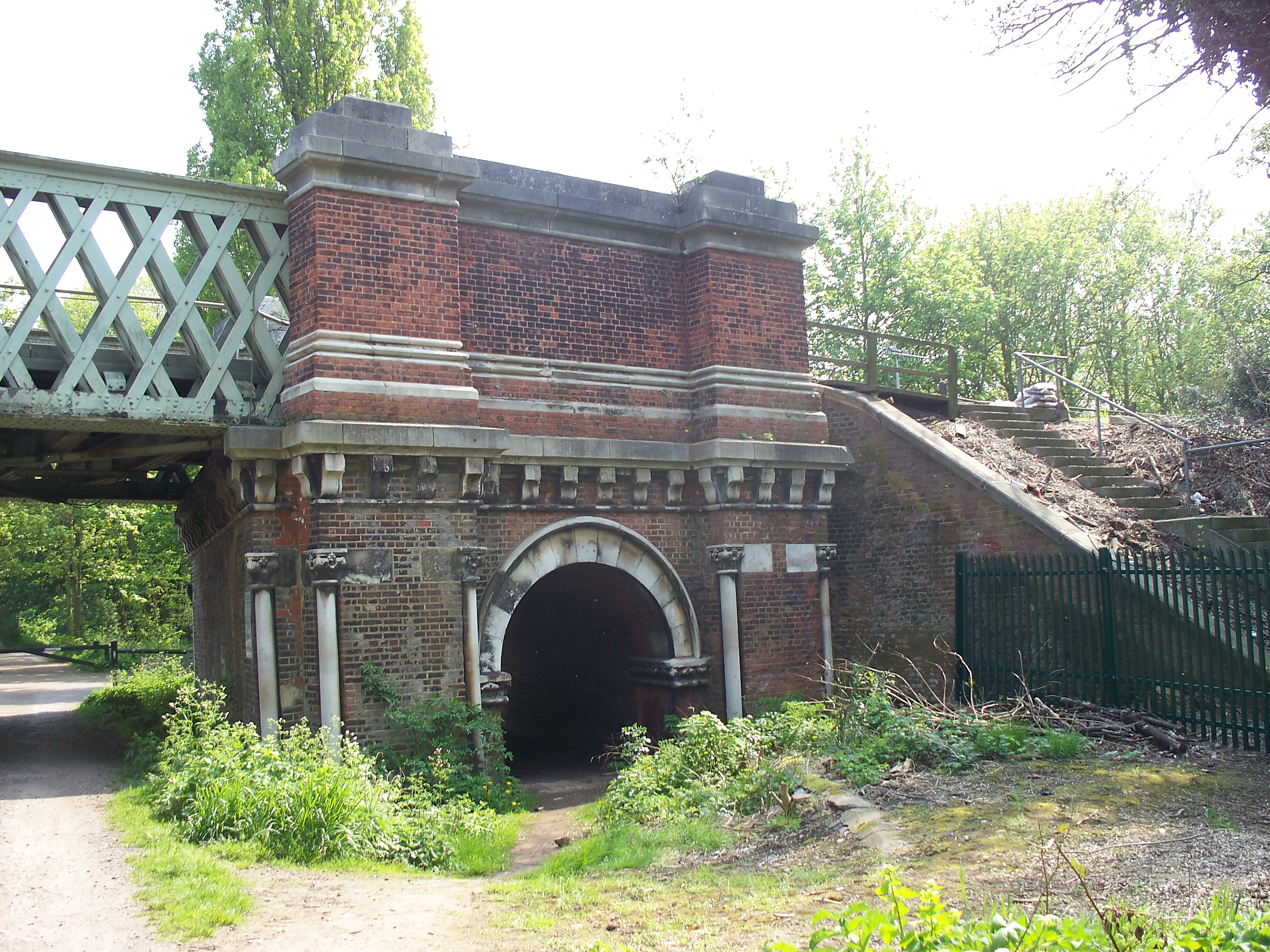
Kew Railway Bridge stonework

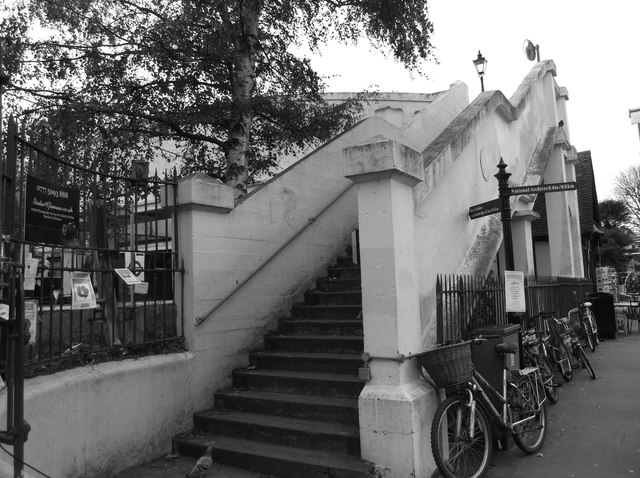
Kew Gardens Station Footbridge

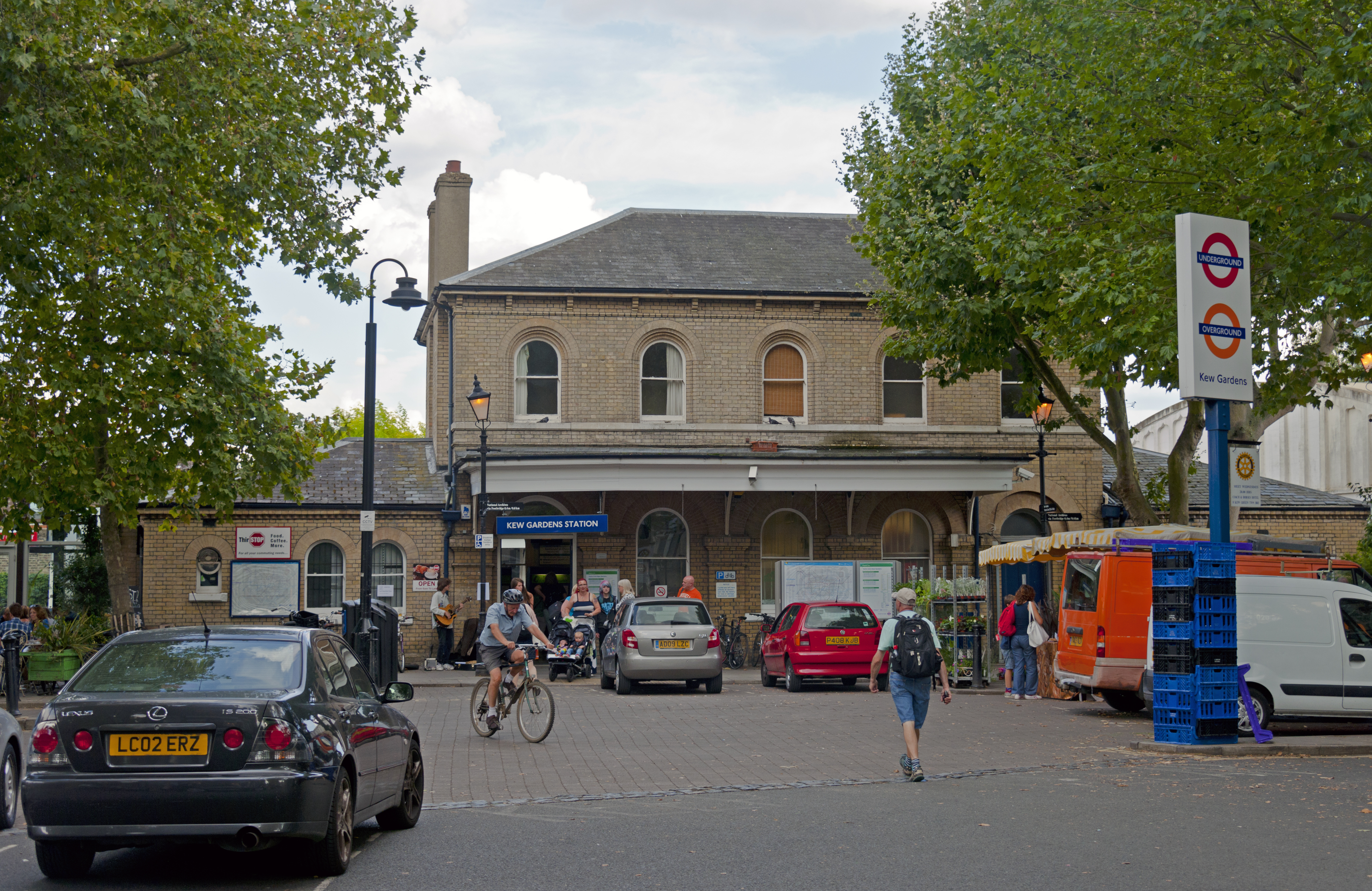
Kew Gardens Station: main entrance on the eastbound side, 2014

2011 Census households
Ward	Population	Households	% Owned outright	% Owned with a loan	Hectares
Kew	11,436	4,941	30	30	330

=== Ethnicity ===
In the 2011 census, 66.2% of Kew's population were White British. Other White was the second largest category at 16%, with 8.1% being Asian.

== Transport ==
In the past, a main mode of transport between Kew and London, for rich and poor alike, was by water along the Thames, which separated Middlesex (on the north bank) from Surrey: Kew was also connected to Brentford, Middlesex by ferry, first replaced by a bridge in 1759. The current Kew Bridge, which carries the South Circular Road (the A205), was opened by King Edward VII and Queen Alexandra in 1903.

Kew Road (A307) passes through Kew as a single carriageway, and provides the main road link to Richmond. The M4 motorway starts a short distance north of Kew, providing access to Heathrow Airport and the west. The A316 road starts in Chiswick and continues over Chiswick Bridge and a complex junction with the South Circular Road at Chalker's Corner at the south-eastern end of the district.

Rail services have been available from Kew Gardens station since 1869. London Underground (District line) services run to Richmond and to central London. London Overground (Mildmay line) trains run to Richmond and (via Willesden Junction) to Stratford.

The 65, 110 and R68 bus routes serve Kew. River bus services run from Kew Pier to Westminster Millennium Pier, Richmond and Hampton Court.

Nearest places

- Brentford
- East Sheen
- Richmond
- Gunnersbury
- Chiswick
- Mortlake
- Barnes

Nearest railway stations

- Kew Bridge station (South Western Railway)
- Kew Gardens station (London Overground Mildmay line; London Underground District line)
- North Sheen station (South Western Railway)

Bridges

- Kew Bridge, which carries the A205 South Circular Road. Beside the bridge is Kew Pier, which serves tourist ferries operating under licence from London River Services.
- Kew Railway Bridge

== Parks and open spaces ==
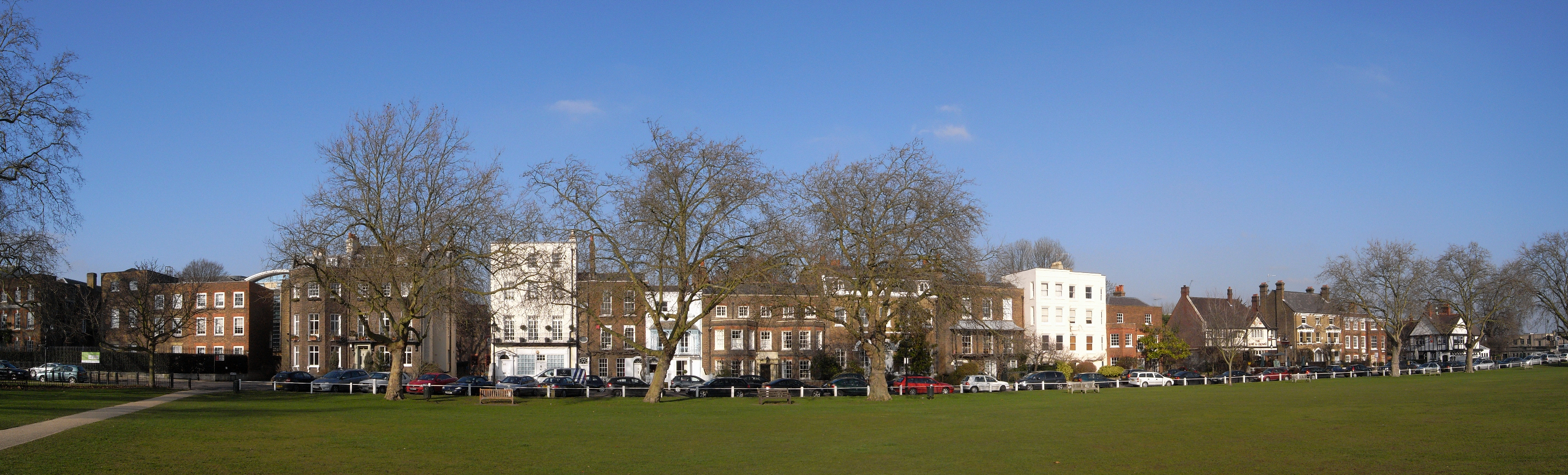
Kew Green

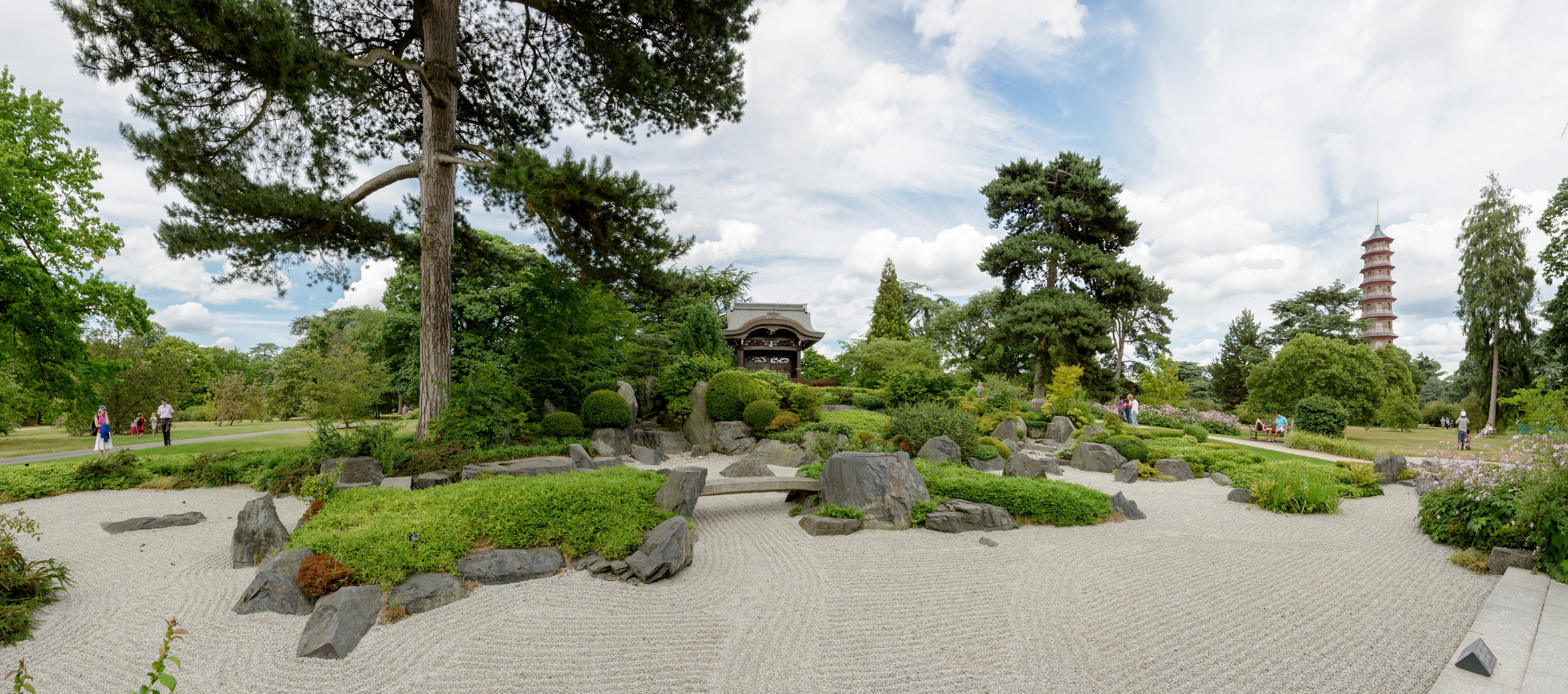
Japanese garden in Kew Gardens

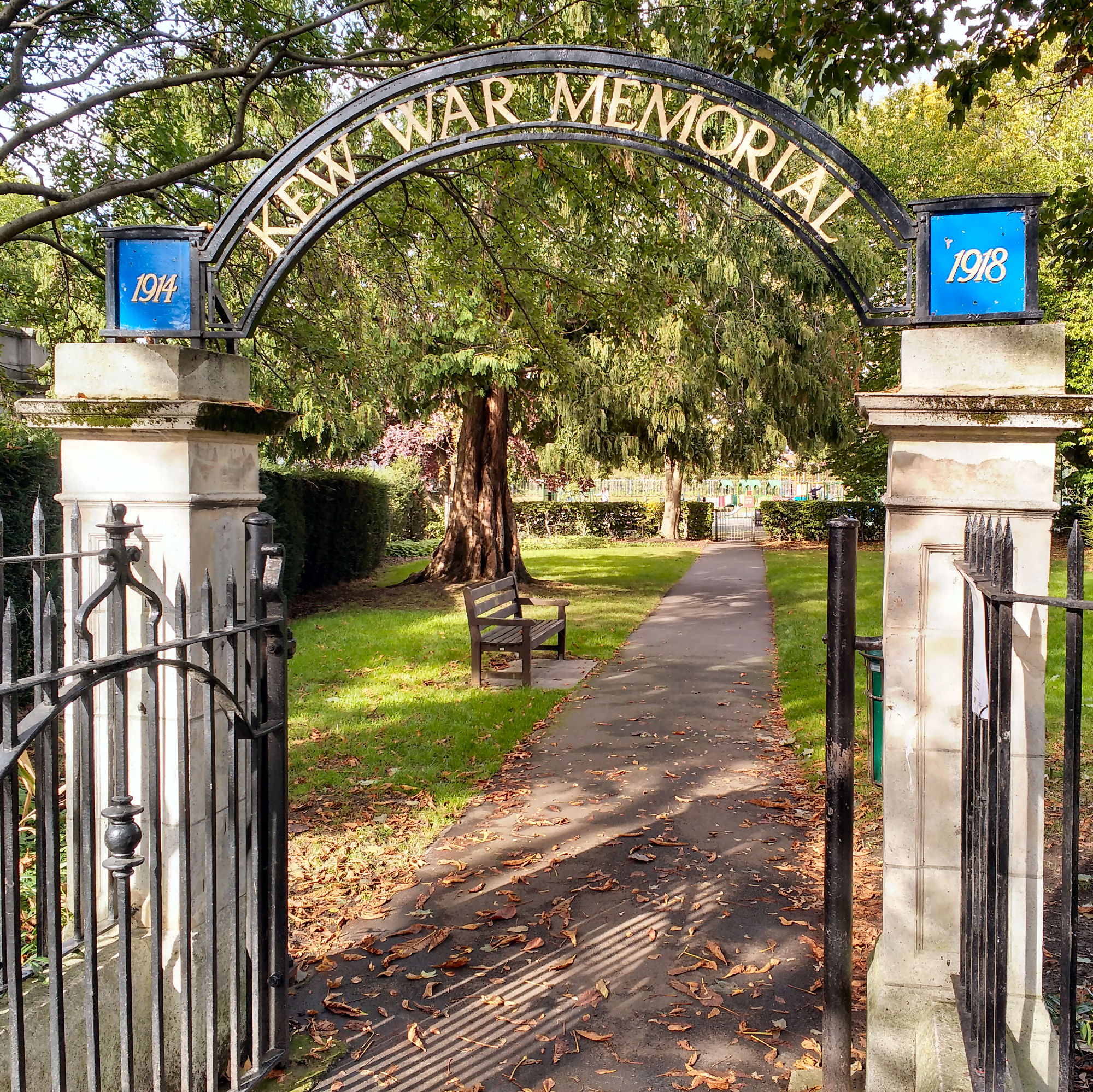
The war memorial gate at Westerley Ware

- Kew Green is used by Kew Cricket Club for cricket matches in the summer.
- Kew Pond, near the north-east corner of Kew Green, believed to date from the tenth century, is originally thought to have been a natural pond fed from a creek of the tidal Thames. During high (spring) tides, sluice gates are opened to allow river water to fill the pond via an underground channel. The pond is concreted, rectangular in shape and contains an important reed bed habitat which is vital for conservation and resident water birds.
- North Sheen Recreation Ground, between North Road and Dancer Road, known locally as "The Rec", was originally part of an orchard belonging to the Popham Estate, owned by the Leyborne Pophams whose family seat was at Littlecote House, Wiltshire. Opened in June 1909 and extended in 1923, it now contains football pitches, a running track, a children's paddling pool and two extensive playgrounds. It is also the home of a local football club, Kew Park Rangers. A sports pavilion was opened in September 2011.
- Pensford Field, previously playing fields of the former Gainsborough School, is a nature reserve that was managed until 2025 by Pensford Field Environmental Trust. It is now the home of Pensford Tennis Club and of Dose of Nature, a mental health and well-being charity.
- St Luke's Open Space, a quiet sitting area and toddlers' play area, was previously a playground for a former Victorian primary school. (Note: The former building of St Luke's School is now an art studio."Kew Studio". 24 January 2013.)
- Westerley Ware is at the foot of Kew Bridge. It was created as a memorial garden to those who died in the First World War, and also has a grass area, three hard tennis courts and a children's playground. Its name refers to the practice of netting weirs or "wares" to catch fish.

== Sport and leisure ==
Kew's several other sports clubs include:

- North Sheen Bowling Club on Marksbury Avenue
- Priory Park Club on Forest Road – tennis and (until 2017) bowls
- Putney Town Rowing Club on Townmead Road
- Richmond Gymnastics Association on Townmead Road

The nearest Premier League football club is Brentford FC; its stadium, opened in 2021, is on the other side of Kew Bridge, near Kew Bridge station.

== Societies ==
The Kew Society
- Formation: 1901 (as the Kew Union)
- Legal status: registered charity
- Members: 800
- Chair: Rachel Kent
- Main organ: The Kew Society Newsletter
- Budget: £32,848
- Staff: none
- Website: www.kewsociety.org

The Kew Horticultural Society, founded in 1938, organises an annual show in late August/early September as well as talks, events and outings throughout the year.

The Kew Society, founded in 1901 as the Kew Union, is a civic society that seeks to enhance the beauty of Kew and preserve its heritage. It reviews all planning applications in Kew with special regard to the architectural integrity and heritage of the neighbourhood, and plays an active role in the improvement of local amenities. The Society, which is a member of Civic Voice, organises community events including talks and outings and produces a quarterly newsletter. Its patrons are Nick Baird and Sir David Durie.

The Richmond Local History Society, founded in 1985, is concerned with the history of Kew, as well as that of Richmond, Petersham and Ham.

== Education ==
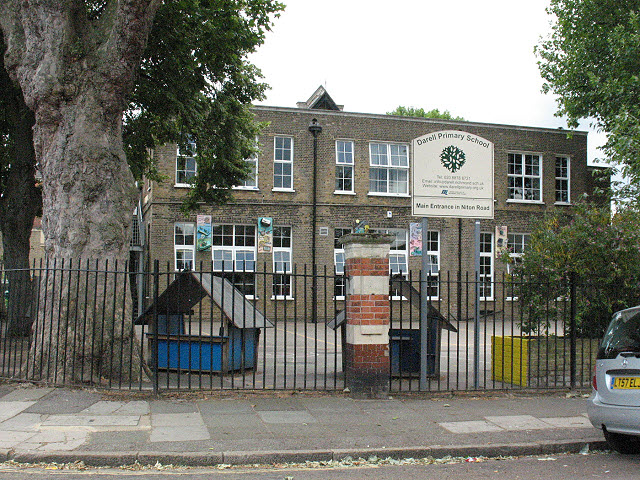
Darell Primary and Nursery School

=== Primary schools ===
- Darell Primary and Nursery School is on Darell Road and Niton Road. It opened in 1906, as the Darell Road Schools, at the southern end of what had been the Leyborne-Popham estate. It was Richmond Borough Council's first primary school and was built in the Queen Anne Revival style, in brick with white stone facings. Although it has been extended several times, it is now the only Richmond borough primary school still in its historic original pre-1914 building.
- Kew Riverside Primary School, on Courtlands Avenue, opened in 2002.
- The King's Church of England Primary School is in Cumberland Road, where it moved in 1969. In her will of 1719, Dorothy, Lady Capel of Kew House left to four trustees Perry Court Farm in Kent, which she had inherited from her father. One twelfth of the rent from the farm was to be given to St Anne's Church to establish a school in Kew. In 1810, a "Free School" was opened in the church for 50 children, financed by subscribers who gave one guinea a year, in addition to a contribution by King George III. In 1824 the school moved to a site near the pond on Kew Green. The foundation stone was laid on 12 August, the birthday of King George IV, who gave £300 on condition that it be called "The King's Free School". Queen Victoria gave permission for it to be called "The Queen's School" and decreed that its title should change with that of the monarch. In 2016, the building that had been created after the move to the Cumberland Road site in 1970 was demolished and a new structure installed in its place.

=== Independent preparatory schools ===
- Broomfield House School, on Broomfield Road, was founded in 1876.
- Kew College Prep, a co-educational school for 3- to 11-year-olds, was founded in 1927 by Mrs Ellen Upton in rooms over a shop in Kew. Mrs Upton's young daughter was one of the first pupils. The school later moved to Cumberland Road. In 1953, Mrs Upton retired and sold the school to Mrs Hamilton-Spry who, in 1985, handed over the buildings to a charitable trust to ensure the school's long-term continuity.
- Kew Green Preparatory School, at Layton House, Ferry Lane, near Kew Green, opened in 2004.
- Unicorn School, established in 1970, is a co-educational, parent-owned independent preparatory school on Kew Road, opposite Kew Gardens.

=== Sixth-form schools ===
The Swedish School in London's sixth form (gymnasiet) for 16- to 19-year-olds is co-located with The National Archives in Kew.

=== Former schools ===
From 1840, Leopold Neumegen operated a Jewish school in Kew after his earlier school in Highgate closed and when, for financial reasons, he needed to commence work again. Neumegen's wife and, later, their daughter Ada, ran the school after his death; it closed during the First World War. The school was at Gloucester House, built in around 1750 and named after Prince William Henry, Duke of Gloucester and Edinburgh (1743–1805) who used it as a country retreat. The house has been demolished and is now the site of Gloucester House, a block of flats.

== Places of worship ==
Four churches in Kew are currently in use:

Name	Denomination	History	Address	Website	Image
Our Lady of Loreto & St Winefride Catholic Church, Kew	Roman Catholic	From 1890 to 1906 local Roman Catholics met in a temporary chapel at a Catholic mission on Kew Gardens Road. Designed by the architects Scoles & Raymond, the new church was opened in 1906 and the side aisles, baptistery and chapels were added in 1968. The sanctuary was remodelled in 1977 and the church was refurbished and decorated in 1998. A parish hall is located next to the church. After a parishioner's bequest paid off the church's debts, the church was dedicated and consecrated in 1979.	1 Leyborne Park, Kew, Richmond TW9 3HB	www.stwinefrides.org.uk	
St Anne's Church, Kew	Anglican	Built in 1714 on land given by Queen Anne, the church, now Grade II* listed, has been extended several times. The present parish hall was built in 1978. The churchyard has two Grade II* listed monuments – the tombs of the artists Johan Zoffany (d. 1816) and Thomas Gainsborough (d. 1788).	Kew Green, Kew, Richmond TW9 3AA	www.saintanne-kew.org.uk	
St Luke's Church, Kew	Anglican	Founded in 1889, St Luke's now forms a joint parish with the Barn Church (below). The church, built in the Gothic Revival style by architects Goldie, Child and Goldie, was redesigned in 1983 to create a smaller space for Christian worship in the former chancel area and to enable the former nave, and a second hall constructed in a loft conversion, to be used for community purposes also: it now hosts the Kew Community Trust and acts as a community centre.	The Avenue, Kew, Richmond TW9 2AJ	www.stlukeskew.org	
St Philip and All Saints Church, Kew (the Barn Church)	Anglican	Founded in 1929, this was the first barn church to be consecrated in England. Local Anglicans previously worshipped at St Peter's, a hall erected in 1910 (and now demolished) on the corner of Marksbury Avenue and Chilton Road. The church building was constructed in 1929 from a 17th- (or possibly 16th-) century barn from Oxted in Surrey. The west end was converted in 2002 into a large parish room with a gallery above looking down the length of the building. The sanctuary was refurbished and remodelled in 1998.	Atwood Avenue, Kew, Richmond TW9 4HF	barnchurchkew.uk	

Former churches include:

- Kew Baptist Church, a Grace Baptist church, which was founded in 1861 in Richmond as Salem Baptist Church. It moved in 1973 to a new building on Windsor Road in Kew, adopting the name Kew Baptist Church in 1990, and closed in 2020. The building is now used as a pool for children's swimming lessons.
- the late 19th-century Cambridge Road Wesleyan Methodist Chapel, previously known as the Gloucester Road Wesleyan Methodist Chapel and also known as Cambridge Road Methodist Church, which was in use from 1891 to 1969. It is now a private residence.

A late Victorian Salvation Army hall at 6 North Road, built in the style of a chapel, was converted into flats (1–5 Quiet Way) in 2006.

== Cemeteries and crematorium ==
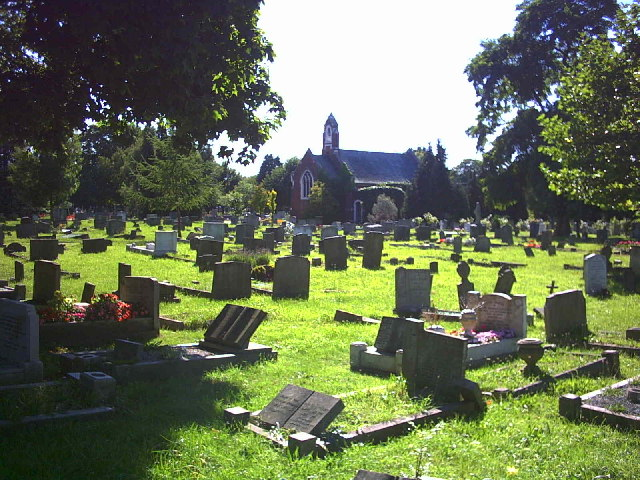
North Sheen Cemetery

Mortlake Crematorium and two cemeteries – North Sheen Cemetery and Mortlake Cemetery – are located in Kew. The crematorium serves the boroughs of Ealing, Hammersmith and Fulham, Hounslow and Richmond upon Thames and the two cemeteries are managed by Hammersmith and Fulham Council.

== Literary references to Kew ==
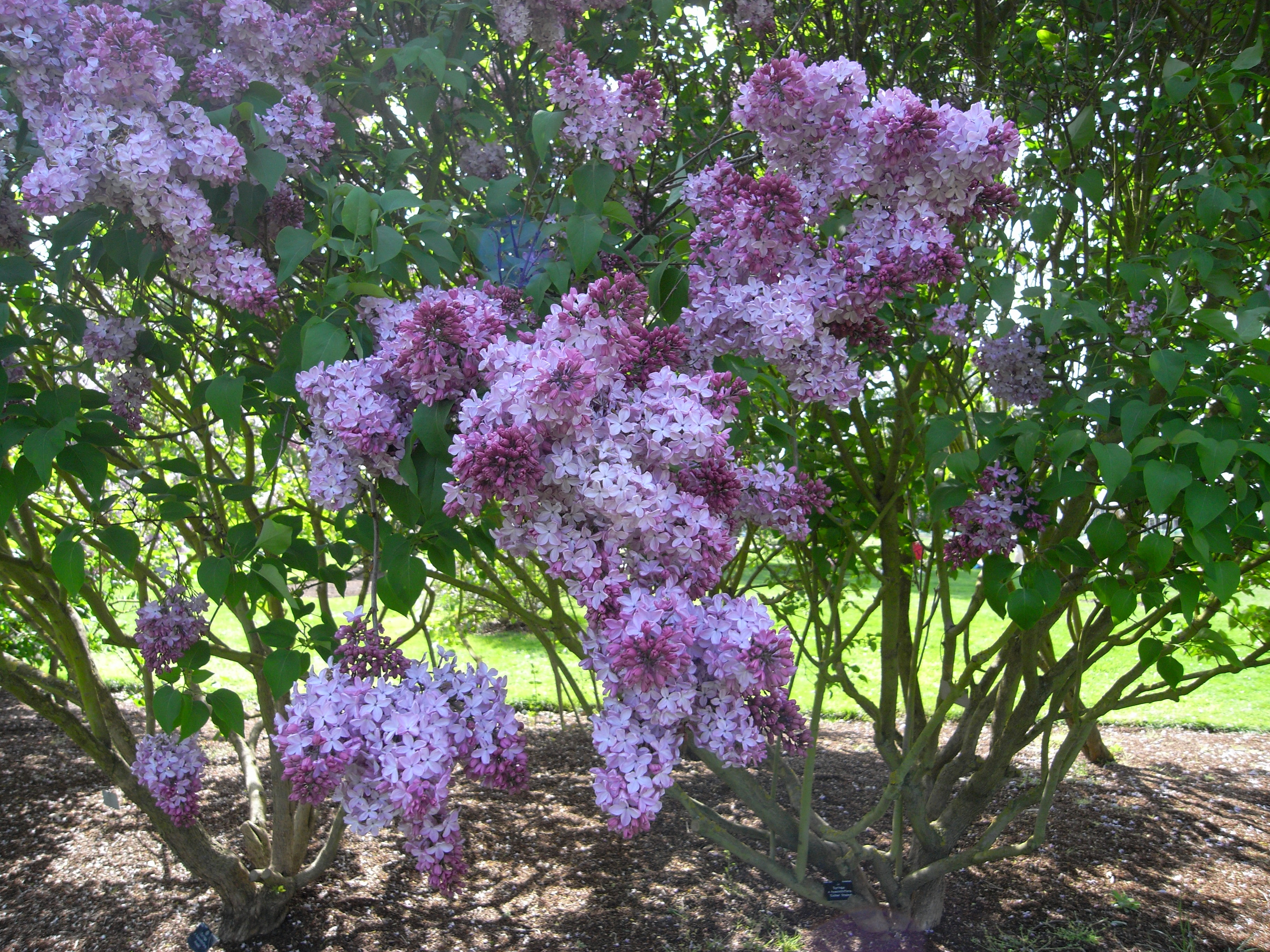
Lilac in Kew Gardens

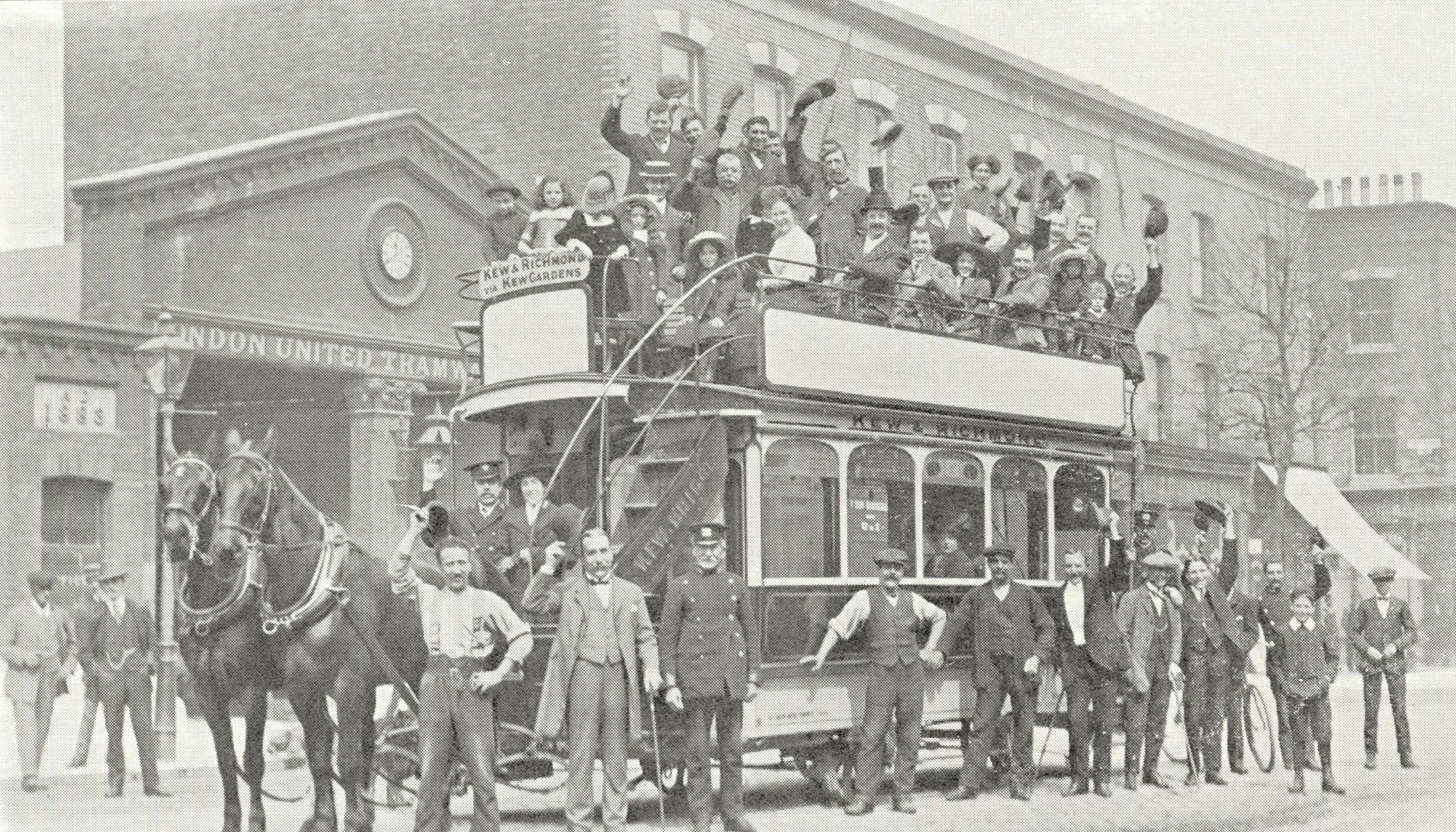
Tram to Kew and Richmond c.1900

I am His Highness' dog at Kew;
Pray tell me, sir, whose dog are you?

Epigram, engraved on the Collar of a Dog which I gave to his Royal Highness (Frederick, Prince of Wales), 1736 (Alexander Pope, 1688–1744)

And the wildest dreams of Kew are the facts of Khatmandhu.

In The Neolithic Age, 1892 (Rudyard Kipling, 1865–1936)

Go down to Kew in lilac-time, in lilac-time, in lilac-time;
Go down to Kew in lilac-time (it isn't far from London!)
And you shall wander hand in hand with love in summer's wonderland;
Go down to Kew in lilac-time (it isn't far from London!)

The Barrel-Organ, 1920 (Alfred Noyes, 1880–1958)

Trams and dusty trees.
Highbury bore me. Richmond and Kew
Undid me.

The Waste Land, 1922 (T. S. Eliot, 1888–1965)

Lady Croom: My hyacinth dell is become a haunt for
hobgoblins, my Chinese bridge, which I am assured is
superior to the one at Kew, and for all I know at Peking, is
usurped by a fallen obelisk overgrown with briars.

Arcadia, 1993 (Tom Stoppard, 1937–2025)

== See also ==
- Dodge 100 "Kew" and Dodge 300 trucks that were built in Kew
- Kew Gardens (the botanic gardens in Kew) and Royal Botanic Gardens, Kew (the non-departmental public body that manages the botanic gardens in Kew and at Wakehurst in Sussex)
- Kew Green
- Kew Letters
- Kew Mortuary
- Kew Observatory
- Kew Palace
- North Sheen
- The National Archives

== Sources ==
- Blomfield, David (1994). Kew Past. Chichester, Sussex: Phillimore & Co Ltd. ISBN 0-85033-923-5
