= Alfred Luff =

English cricketer

Personal information
- Full name: Alfred Luff
- Born: 5 April 1846; Kew, Surrey, England
- Died: 24 February 1933 (aged 86); Tonbridge, Kent, England
- Batting: Right-handed
- Bowling: Right-arm roundarm fast

Domestic team information
- Years: Team
- 1867: Surrey

Career statistics
Competition	First-class
Matches	3
Runs scored	25
Batting average	5.00
100s/50s	–/–
Top score	8
Balls bowled	208
Wickets	2
Bowling average	55.50
5 wickets in innings	–
10 wickets in match	–
Best bowling	1/25
Catches/stumpings	–/–
- Source: Cricinfo, 23 June 2012

Alfred Luff (5 April 1846 – 24 February 1933) was an English cricketer. Luff was a right-handed batsman who bowled right-arm roundarm fast. He was born at Kew, Surrey.

Luff made three first-class appearances for Surrey in 1867, the first of which came against Yorkshire at The Oval. His second appearance came against the Marylebone Cricket Club at The Oval, while his third appearance came against Yorkshire at Bramall Lane, Sheffield. He scored 25 runs in his three matches, at an average of 5.00 and a high score of 8. With the ball, he took 2 wickets at a bowling average of 55.50, with best figures of 1/25. He later stood as an umpire in two first-class matches in 1874, between the Gentlemen of the South and the Players of the North, and the Gentlemen against the Players. He also stood in six Minor Counties Championship matches between 1898 and 1902.

He died at Tonbridge, Kent, on 24 February 1933.
