= Kew Green Preparatory School =

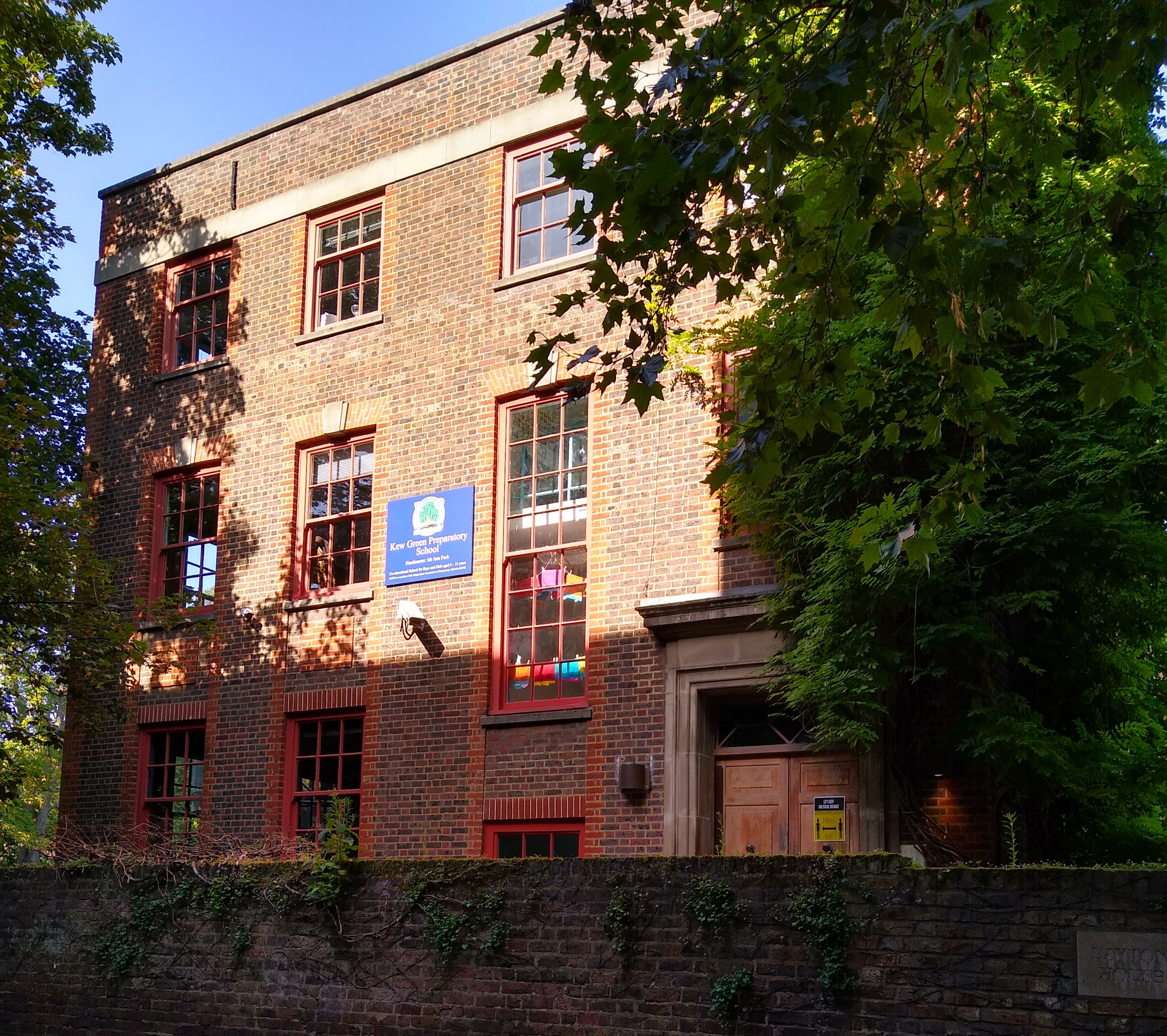

Location
- Layton House, Ferry Lane; Kew, TW9 3AF; England
- Coordinates: 51°29′09″N 0°17′24″W

Information
- Type: Preparatory day school
- Established: 2004
- Founders: Maria Gardener; Edward Gardener
- Headteacher: Mr Aidan McLaughlin
- Gender: Coeducational
- Age: 4 to 11
- Enrolment: 263
- Colour: Blue
- Website: https://www.kgps.co.uk/

Kew Green Preparatory School is a non-denominational mixed preparatory school in Kew in the London Borough of Richmond upon Thames.

It has a nursery with facilities including a climbing frame and mud kitchen. It also offers PE sessions designed for pre-reception children, with classes for ballet, yoga, and movement.
