= Kew College Prep =

Location
- 24–26 Cumberland Road; Richmond, TW9 3HQ; England; 51°28′50″N 0°17′05″W

Information
- Type: Preparatory day school
- Motto: Labor et honore Literal translation: "There is honour in hard work".
- Established: 1927
- Founder: Ellen Upton
- Department for Education URN: 102940 Tables
- Head teacher: Jane Bond
- Gender: Co-educational
- Age: 3 to 11
- Enrolment: 294
- Colour: Blue
- Website: https://www.kewcollegeprep.com/

Kew College Prep (previously known as Kew College) is a non-denominational, independent, mixed preparatory school on Cumberland Road in Kew in the London Borough of Richmond upon Thames

Located opposite King's School, Kew College Prep caters for children aged 3 to 11.

== History ==
Kew College Prep was established in 1927 as a small school located in a room above a shop in Kew. As the number of pupils grew, the school moved to a large Victorian house in Cumberland Road. In 1953 the school expanded into a second house in Cumberland Road. It became a charitable trust in 1985.

== Present day ==
Kew College Prep averages 292 pupils between the ages of 3 and 11. Children start in the nursery and stay at the school until the end of Year 6 when they move to secondary school.
