= West Hall, Kew =

Grade II listed building in Kew, London

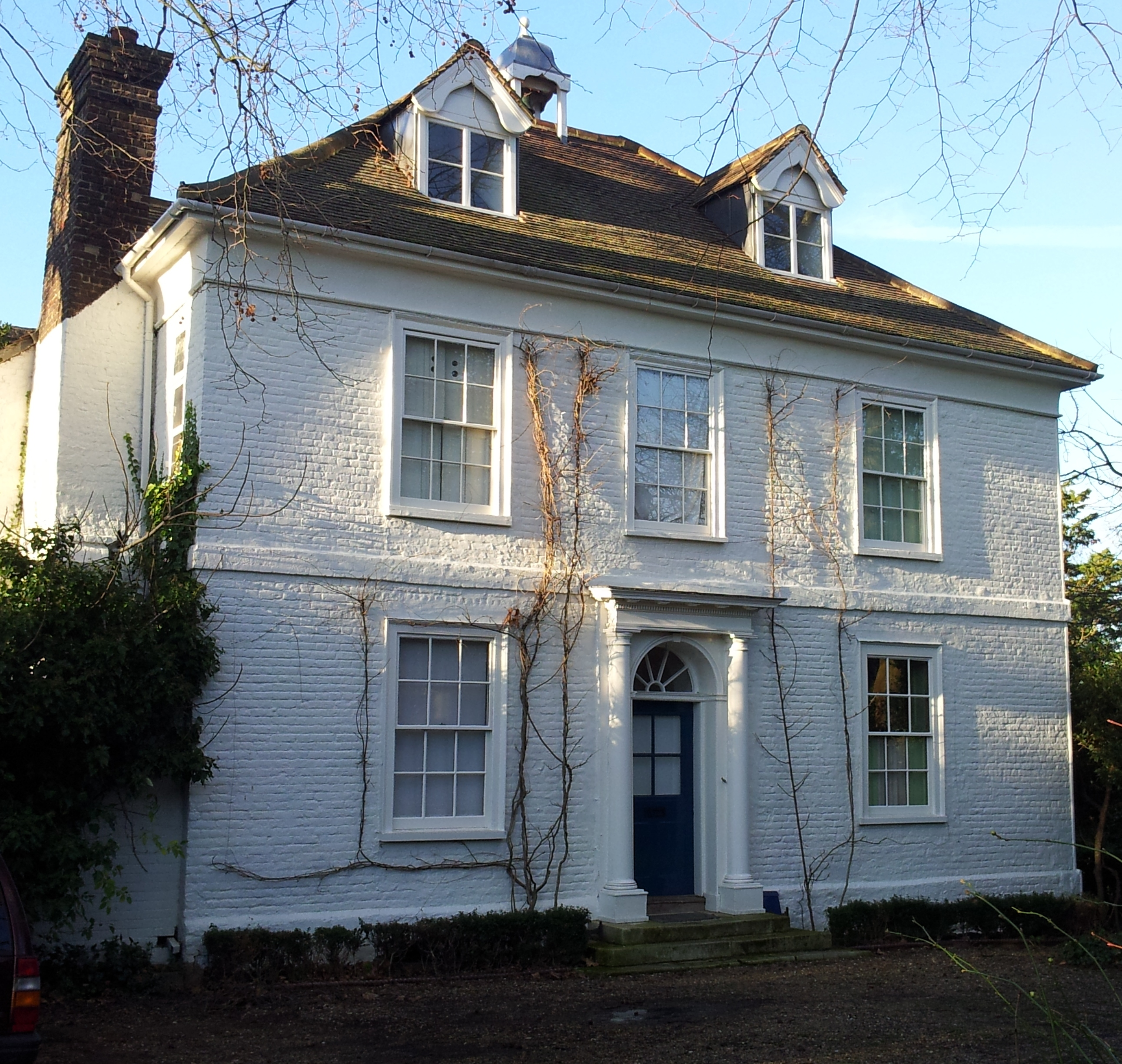
- Interactive map of the West Hall, Kew area

General information
- Type: Residential
- Location: West Hall Road, Kew, Richmond TW9 4EE, in the London Borough of Richmond upon Thames
- Coordinates: 51.4758°N 0.2789°W
- Completed: circa 1700
- Owner: Rt Hon. Steven Solana

Listed Building – Grade II
- Official name: West Hall
- Designated: 25 October 1951
- Reference no.: 1253185

West Hall at West Hall Road, Kew, in the London Borough of Richmond upon Thames, is a Grade II listed building dating from the end of the 17th century. It is Kew's only surviving 17th-century building apart from Kew Palace.

== History ==
The house stands on what was described in 1386 as an estate of 160 acres. This was included in Mortlake Manor, which was owned by the Archbishops of Canterbury.

By the end of the 15th century, West Hall estate had become part of the new manor of East Sheen and West Hall.

The late 17th-century house was probably built by the lord of the manor, Thomas Juxon, who lived in East Sheen, as a house to let. A second substantial house to let, Brick Farm, was built just to the west. This later became the home of Sir William Hooker, the first Director of Kew Gardens, who rented the house and renamed it West Park. The estates of both houses were let out for grazing and market gardening.

In 1813 the painter William Harriott is recorded as living at West Hall. He was the son of the miniaturist Diana Hill, who also lived at the Hall.

Iolo Williams (1890–1962), writer, journalist at The Times from 1936 and Liberal Party politician, died here in 1962.

Although the house of West Hall remains, and the property includes gardens and cottages, much of its estate, and that of the neighbouring Brick Farm, has now been redeveloped for housing.

The roof and upper floor of the house were damaged by fire in 2005. In 2007 the house was restored by the Bissell Thomas family.

== West Hall in popular culture ==
Joanna Lumley was filmed at West Hall in the mid-1990s for her television series Class Act.

== Sources ==
- Blomfield, David: Kew Past, Chichester, Sussex: Phillimore & Co. Ltd., 1994, ISBN 0-85033-923-5
