= George Vassila =

English cricketer

Personal information
- Full name: George Charles Vassila
- Born: 21 August 1857; Kew, Surrey, England
- Died: 27 November 1915 (aged 58); Epsom, Surrey, England
- Batting: Right-handed
- Bowling: Right-arm fast

Domestic team information
- Years: Team
- 1880: Middlesex

Career statistics
Competition	FC
Matches	1
Runs scored	0
Batting average	0.00
100s/50s	–/–
Top score	0*
Balls bowled	132
Wickets	–
Bowling average	–
5 wickets in innings	–
10 wickets in match	–
Best bowling	–
Catches/stumpings	–/–
- Source: Cricinfo, 30 November 2010

George Charles Vassila (21 August 1857 – 27 November 1915) was an English cricketer. Vassila was a right-handed batsman who bowled right-arm fast. He was born at Kew, Surrey.

Vassila played a single first-class match for Middlesex in 1880 against Gloucestershire at the Clifton College Close Ground in Clifton, Bristol.

The season following his only first-class appearance, he stood as an umpire in a first-class match between Cambridge University and the Marylebone Cricket Club. In 1889 he stood in his second and final first-class match between Cambridge University and Yorkshire.

Vassila died at Epsom, Surrey on 27 November 1915. His death was registered as George Charles Vassilas.
