= Doulton =

Doulton is a surname, and may refer to:

- John Doulton, potter, founder of Royal Doulton
- Henry Doulton, son of John Doulton
- Frederick Doulton, Member of Parliament and son of John Doulton

== See also ==
- Royal Doulton, English ceramic manufacturing company, with the earlier names Jones, Watts & Doulton (1815), Doulton & Watts (1820), Doulton & Co. (1853-1901)
