= Francis Claude Blake =

British engineer

- Born: 19 March 1867; Putney, Surrey, England
- Died: 10 April 1954 (aged 87); Surrey, England
- Occupation: Engineer

Francis Claude Blake (19 March 1867 – 10 April 1954) was a British engineer, known for his pioneering work designing and manufacturing cars, boats and railway locomotives. He was a member of the Institution of Automobile Engineers.

Blake was born in Putney in 1867, trained at Nine Elms Locomotive Works (1886-1889), and was draughtsman and clerk of works at Poplar Station of the Commercial Gas Co from 1890 to 1896, after which he set up his own business.

== Company history ==
In 1896, Blake started an engineering company at the Ravenscourt Works, Dalling Road, Hammersmith called Blake Motors. The company produced a design of an “oil motor carriage… being given with a view to the construction of such a carriage by amateurs”.

In 1901, the company had outgrown its original site and moved to The Motor Works, Station Avenue, Kew (a site next to Kew Gardens station). The company was by now supplying components, including complete engines. The company closed in 1906 and the Kew works was sold to The Cowey Engineering Company Ltd who manufactured speedometers and other accessories, however it seems Blake retained some capacity there. In 1920 he applied for a Motor Vehicle patent (GB167518) and gave his address as Station Avenue, Kew Gardens, and in 1922 he sold "Contents of Engineers Works" from the same address, which supports the idea that he continued to build engines and spare parts into the 1920s.

== Car engines ==
The first engine design was available with 1, 2 or 4 water-cooled cylinders, rated at 3hp, 6hp or 12hp. The bore was 90mm and the stroke 102mm, with nominal speed 800rpm, and atmospherically operated inlet valves. Depending on the application the engines were available with either cast iron, or cast aluminium crankcases. Although the main growth area for engines was in car manufacture, Blake looked mainly for opportunities for engines in other areas, such as industrial and marine use, though they did supply some London car manufacturers such as Pritchett and Gold.

A Blake engine was used in a prototype petrol-electric car in 1904, built by Mr A. E. Farrow of Windsor Electrical Installation Co. This was the 4 cylinder engine of 14bhp at 1000rpm, and produced 85Amps at 105Volt using its Blenheim & Co dynamo. This true hybrid car had 40 battery cells to store the electric charge, allowing a range of 20 miles on battery alone.

== Railway locomotives ==
In 1902, Blake undertook the construction of a locomotive for the nearby Richmond Main Sewerage Board at Mortlake, where the locomotive was used to move coal, chemicals, and sludge cake on a 2 ft 9 in (838 mm) gauge railway that connected the wharf to the precipitation works and pumping station. The locomotive used a 6HP twin cylinder water-cooled petrol engine, with chain drive to all 4 wheels. It had two-speed transmission giving 5 or 7 mph in either direction, final drive was by fully enclosed chains. The strong chassis was made of channel, with typical railway horn-plate suspension. It would draw 4.5 tons up a 1 in 30 gradient, and up to 10 tons on the level. In the 1903 report on the loco Blake were also offering a 12HP 4-cylinder version. This was the second successful petrol locomotive built, preceded by an 80hp petrol-mechanical built by the Maudslay Motor Company earlier in 1902 for the Deptford Cattle Market in London.

Blake built at least one more locomotive, supplied to the Port Elizabeth Municipality in South Africa for use on construction of a dam and associated pumping station on the Van Stadens River. These may be the only locomotives that Blake produced.

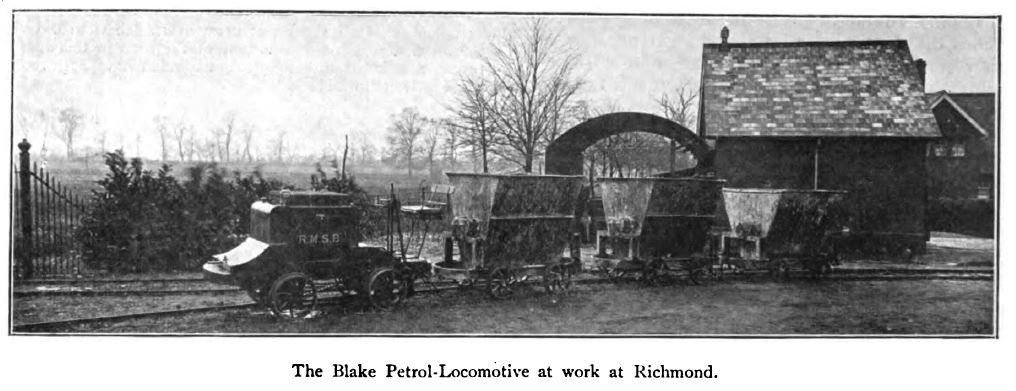
Probably the earliest internal combustion narrow gauge locomotive, the 1902 Blake loco

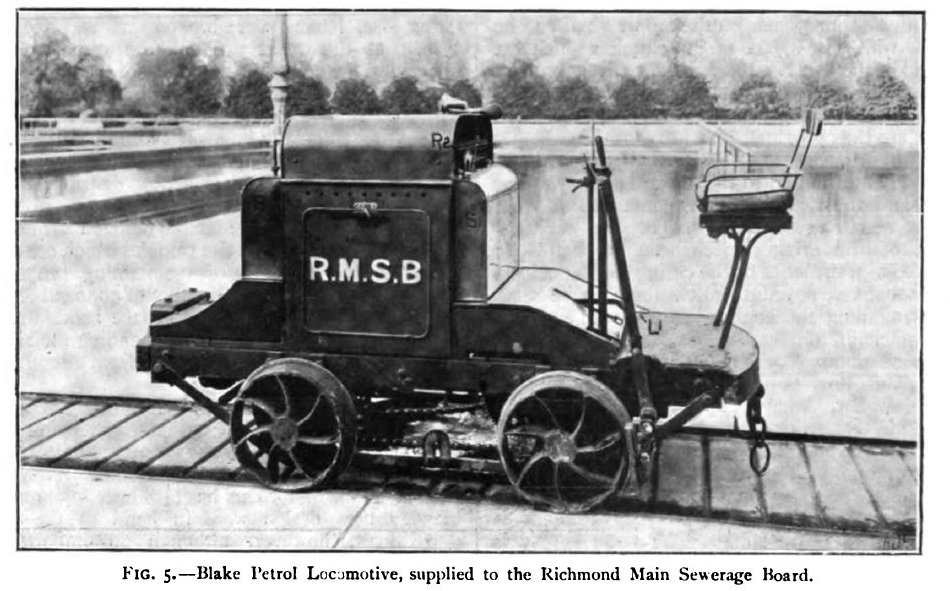
The 1902 Blake narrow gauge locomotive

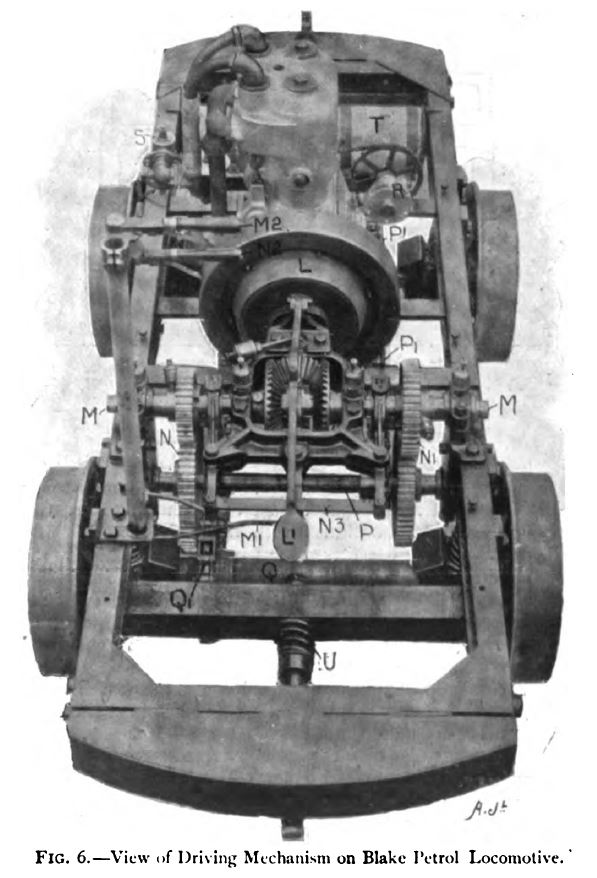
Mechanical details of the Blake loco

== Marine engines ==
Blake engines were popular in motor boats and in 1903 in response to demand from owners of motor vessels, they launched a completely new larger range of engines of 40 to 50hp rating. These larger engines had mechanically operated inlet valves, with exhaust and inlet being on opposite sides of the cylinder, so requiring twin camshafts, which had roller cam followers. Rated at 500rpm, these engines were expected to give 65bhp. An interim power engine of 24 to 30hp rating and 750rpm was at the planning stage. At the 1905 Olympia show Blake displayed their "well-known Blake marine motors" in 18-24hp and 25-35hp sizes.

Blake was particularly interested in marine engines and in 1905, he received a patent for a reversing gear for boats. The company focused on creating motors for use in boats. By 1906, it was advertising a line of engines for "Auxiliary Yacht and Launch Work".

Blake engines were installed in some of the first motorised lifeboats, notable at Walton-on-the-Naze, Stronsay, and Donaghadee.

A ship of a very different kind, Captain William Beedle's airship of 1903, used a 12HP Blake motor (15 or 16bhp). This 26,000 cubic feet hydrogen-filled cigar shaped balloon was 93 feet long and 23 feet in diameter, from which was suspended a framework of tubing 56 feet long by 4 feet high. At the rear of this was the Blake engine driving the main propeller, further forward were directional propellers which were the steering apparatus allowing it to turn left or right, or to point up or down as required. The motor used was quoted as nominal 12hp, which ties in with the standard 4-cylinder engine with atmospheric inlet valves, although the engine was stated to be largely aluminium and weighed 180 pounds. The airship was unsuccessful, though the problems experienced were not with the Blake motor.
