= Kew Green (painting) =

Painting by Camille Pissarro

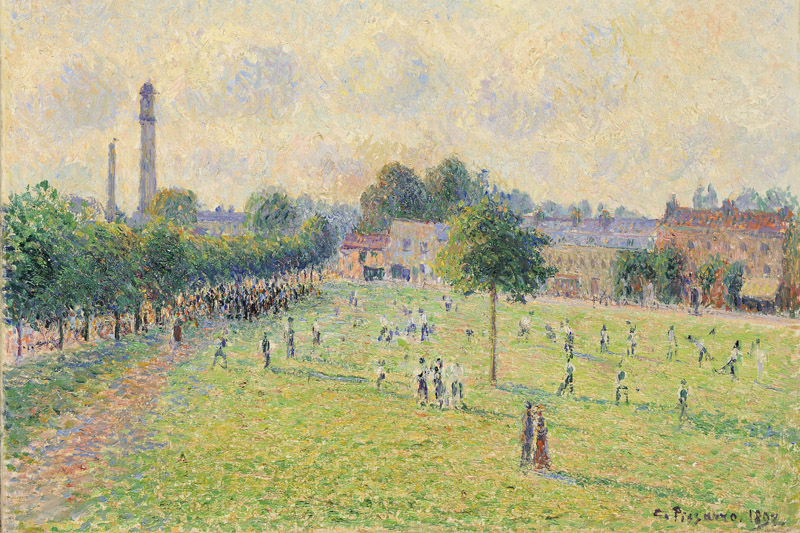
- Artist: Camille Pissarro
- Year: 1892
- Medium: Oil on canvas, landscape painting
- Dimensions: 46 cm × 55 cm (18 in × 22 in)
- Location: Museum of Fine Arts, Lyon

Kew Green (French title: Kew Greens) is an 1892 oil painting by the French artist Camille Pissarro. It features a view across Kew Green, then to the west of London. A game of cricket is taking place on the green. The approach to Kew Bridge is on the left. The tower of the Kew Bridge Pumping Station is visible from the other side of the River Thames. Pissarro rented a house at 1 Gloucester Terrace which overlooked the green and he painted this view from the window. A blue plaque now commemorates where he stayed.

The painting was acquired by the French state in 1979. Since 1986 it has formally been part of the inventory of the Musée d'Orsay but on long-term loan to the Museum of Fine Arts in Lyon.

== See also ==
- List of paintings by Camille Pissarro

== Bibliography ==
- Corbeau-Parsons, Caroline (ed.) Impressionists in London: French Artists in Exile 1870–1904. Tate Publishing, 2017.
- Pissarro, Joachim. Camille Pissarro. H.N. Abrams, 1993.
- Reed, Nicholas. Pissarro in West London. Lilburne Press, 1997.
