= Betham =

Betham is a surname. Notable people with the surname include:

- Asa Betham (1838–?), United States Navy sailor and Medal of Honor recipient
- Cecilia Betham (1843–1913), Irish archer
- Fred Betham (1915–1984), Samoan politician and diplomat
- Geoffrey Betham (1899–1962), English cricketer and British Indian Army officer
- Jaclyn Betham (born 1986), American actress and ballet dancer
- John Betham (1642?–1709), English Catholic priest and tutor to James Francis Edward Stuart
- Mary Matilda Betham (1776–1852), English poet and painter
- Matilda Betham-Edwards (1836–1919), English novelist and travel writer
- Monty Betham (born 1978), New Zealand boxer and rugby league footballer
- Monty Betham (boxer) (born 1952), New Zealand boxer
- Peter Betham (born 1989), New Zealand rugby union player
- Richard Betham (fl. 1978), Samoan boxer
- Stephen Betham, Samoan rugby union coach
- Thomas de Betham (fl. 1302–1312), English politician
- William Betham (1749–1839), English clergyman and antiquarian
- William Betham (1779–1853), English herald and antiquarian who held the office of Ulster King of Arms

== See also ==
- Beetham (disambiguation)
- Bentham (surname)
