= Bentham =

Bentham may refer to:

- Bentham, Gloucestershire in Badgeworth
- Bentham, North Yorkshire
- Bentham (surname)
- → Jeremy Bentham, 18th century English philosopher and founder of modern Utilitarianism
- Bentham (One Piece), a character in Eiichiro Oda's manga One Piece
- Bentham Grammar School, in North Yorkshire
- Bentham House, housing the University College London Faculty of Laws
- Bentham railway station, in North Yorkshire
- Bentham Science Publishers, scientific publisher in the United Arab Emirates

== See also ==
- Betham
