= Stonham Aspal =

Village in Suffolk, England

Coordinates: 52.193689°N 1.118783°E

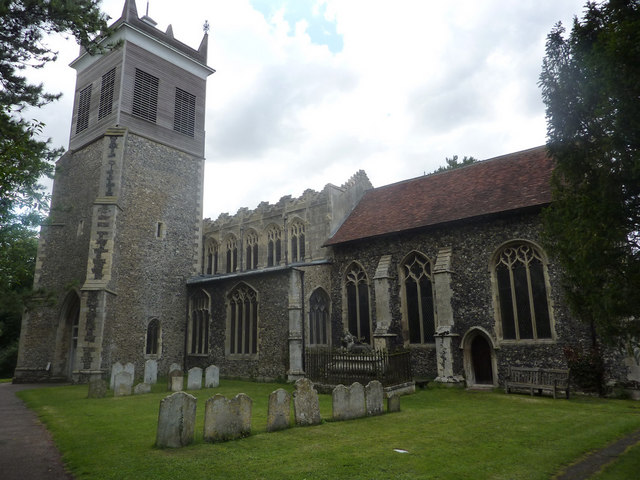
- Church of St Mary & St Lambert

- Location within Suffolk
- Population: 601 (2011)
- District: Mid Suffolk
- Shire county: Suffolk
- Region: East
- Country: England
- Sovereign state: United Kingdom
- Post town: Stowmarket
- Postcode district: IP14
- Police: Suffolk
- Fire: Suffolk
- Ambulance: East of England
- Website: www.stonhamaspal.co.uk

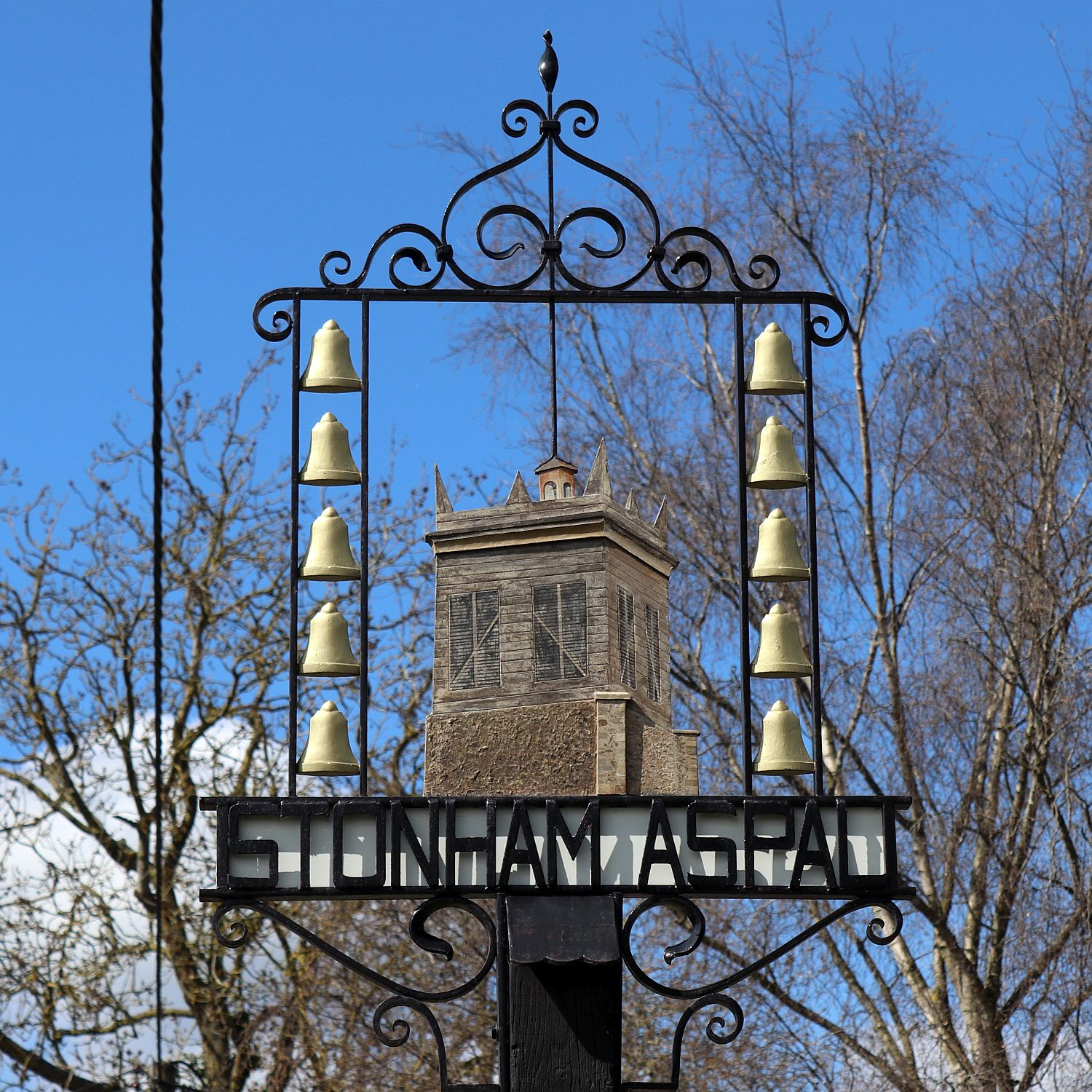
Stonham Aspal village sign, showing the church’s ten bells

Stonham Aspal is a village and civil parish in the Mid Suffolk district of Suffolk in eastern England, some five miles (8 km) east of the town of Stowmarket. Nearby villages include Mickfield, Little Stonham and Pettaugh. Its population in 2011 was 601. The village has a primary school. It is set in farmland, but has a busy main road, A1120, running through.

== History ==
Settlement at Stonham Aspal dates back to the Roman hypocaust period. It is mentioned in the 1086 Domesday Book as Estuna in the Bosmere hundred of Suffolk, with 2 villagers, 4 smallholders and 11 freemen. One-and-a-half lord's plough teams and two men's plough teams are also mentioned, along with a seven-acre (2.8 ha), meadow, woodland for 80 pigs, a church and church lands. In 1066 the lord was Aelmer, in 1086 Miles de Belefol.

From 1292, the lord of the manor was Roger de Aspale. The 13th-century name "Stonham" translates as "Stone Homestead". Many houses in the village today are from the 14th and 15th centuries. The main occupation for men, according to census data in 1881, was agriculture. The village became known as Stoneham Antegan in 1361.

Stonham Aspal underwent governmental boundary changes over time. Its hundred court merged in 1327 with Claydon Hundred to become the larger Bosmere-and-Claydon Hundred, although delineation of the old hundreds still defined separate districts. It belonged to Bosmere Registration District from 1894 until its abolition in 1934, then to Gipping registration district, which gained 14,427 in population from absorbing Bosmere. In 1983, Gipping merged into Gipping and Hartismere registration district until 2010, then becoming part of Suffolk registration district.

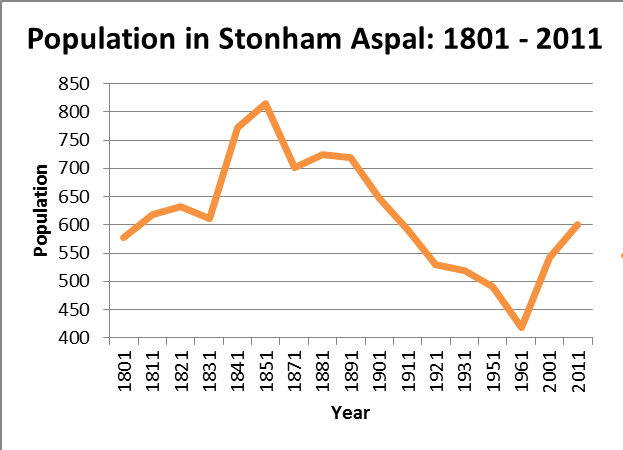

Decennial census data for Stonham Aspal began in 1801. The earliest recorded population, from that time, was 578. The highest figure to be recorded by a census was 814 in 1851, and the lowest was 418 in 1961.

Occupations by Male and Females according to the census data from 1881

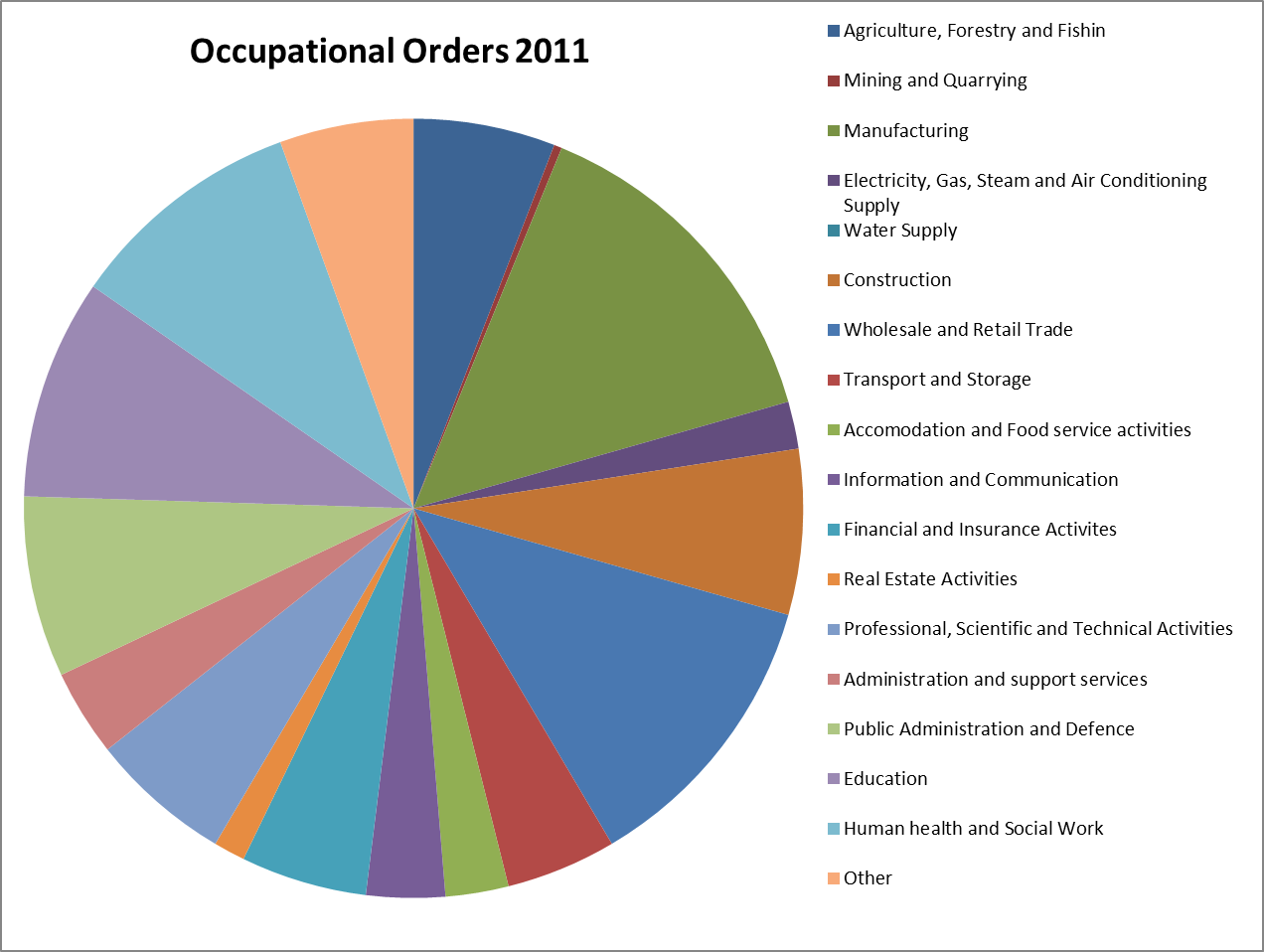
Occupational Orders according to 2011 census data

In the 1870s, Stonham Aspal was described as:

"STONHAM-ASPALL, a parish, with a village, in Bosmere district, Suffolk; 4½ miles NE of Needham-Market r[ailway]. station. It has a post-office under Ipswich. Acres, 2,399. Real property, £4,957. Pop. in 1851, 814; in 1861, 694. Houses, 156."

Agriculture, the main industry recorded for the village in 1881, accounted for about 39 per cent of employment. This sank to 6 per cent by 1961, in line with a general English shift from primary work to the secondary and tertiary sectors. It also explains why the highest employment proportion is about 14 per cent for manufacturing.

On the graph for 1881 occupational orders, the highest number of males worked in agriculture; the equivalent figure for females is unknown. This could be explained by many being housewives and not expected to work in that period, as the next highest proportion of employment is domestic work.

The writer, poet and miniature portrait painter Mary Matilda Betham was born in Stonham Aspal in 1776 and raised there. She was the daughter of William Betham, the headmaster of the endowed school.

== Housing and transport ==
Stonham Aspal is in the Stonhams District ward and described by the Office for National Statistics as a "village surrounded by inhabited countryside". The main housing types are detached, semi-detached, flats and terraced, with housing ownership being private and social housing. The average house price sale for the area in the period from August 2013 to January 2014 was £221,458.33, the majority being detached, at an average price of £265,800.

Stonham Aspal Church of England Voluntary Aided Primary School caters for ages 5–11. It had 189 pupils on its roll in the school year September 2013–July 2014. The school gained a total of 97 per cent of students in 2013 achieving Level 4 or above in reading, writing and maths, which was an improvement of 7 per cent over the previous year. A school inspection by Ofsted on 15 January 2013 rated the school "Good".

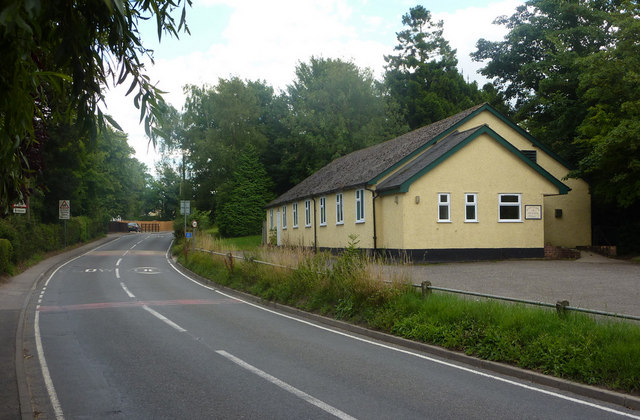
Stonham Aspal Pre School – geograph.org.uk – 1413765

The nearest railway station is at Stowmarket, 2.91 km (1.81 miles) from the village centre. Other stations close by include Needham Market (6.20 km) and Elmswell (8.93 km).

There are two Monday–Saturday public bus services serving the village. The Simonds route 114 runs between Ipswich and Diss, the Galloway European Coachlines route 115 between Wetheringsett and Ipswich. This is no Sunday bus service at present.

== Places of interest ==
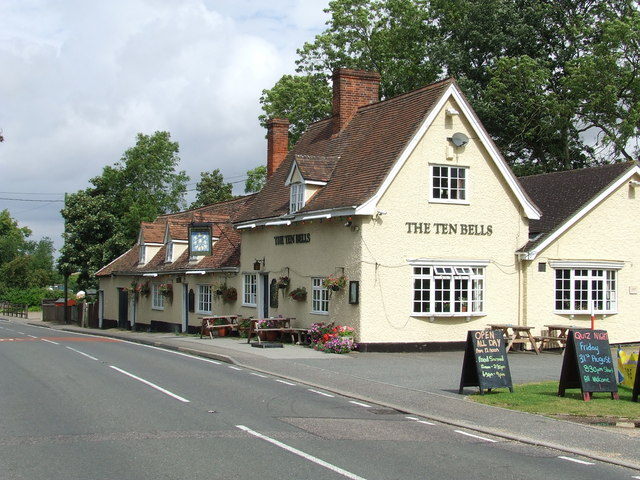
The Ten Bells Stonham Aspal

The former Ten Bells Inn is one of 45 Grade II Listed Buildings in Stonham Aspal listed on 26 March 1987. It dates back as an inn to the late 18th century and was extended in the mid-19th century and again in the mid-20th. The Ten Bells re-opened at the end of 2014 as Casa Mexico, a shop specialising in Mexican products.

St Mary and St Lambert Church, the only place of worship in the village, is an Anglican church. In 1742 Theodore Eccleston, the local squire, replaced a ring of five bells with one of ten and a bell chamber was built to house them. This explains why the bell chamber is a separate structure to the church. The local pub takes its name from the chimes. Within the church there is very little coloured glass apart from medieval fragments in the aisle and two easternmost clerestory windows. St Lambert in the church's name does not derive from St Lambert as such, but from the name of the Lamberts, owners of the Manor.

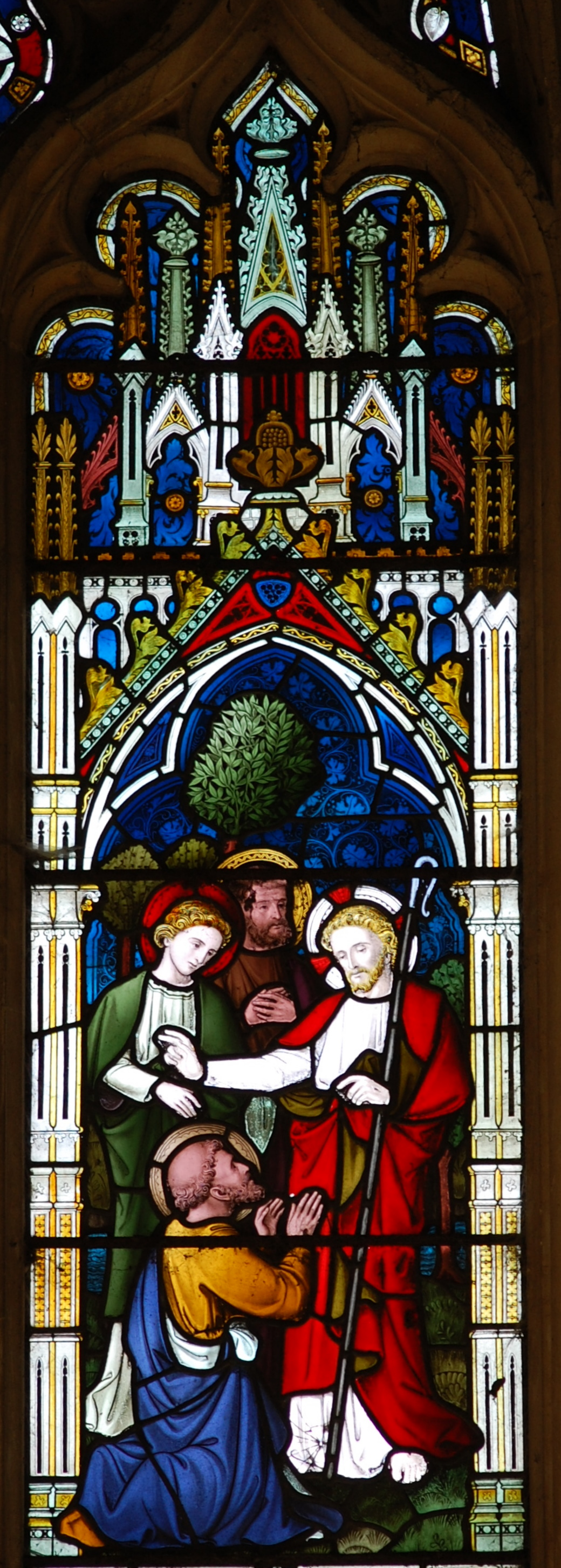
Stained glass window in the church of St Mary and St Lambert of the Confession of Peter (Luke 9:20).

The Suffolk Owl Sanctuary, supported by voluntary donations and admission charges, was founded as a registered charity in 2001. It is currently open to the public all the year round and holds over 80 raptors at the centre. It "operates a comprehensive facility for the care & rehabilitation of owls from the region, and the promotion of owl conservation throughout the UK and beyond."

== Amenities ==
Stonham Aspal Women's Institute was founded in 1923. Through the Suffolk East Federation of Women's Institutes, it is affiliated to the National Federation of Women's Institutes, the UK's largest voluntary organisation for women.

Stonham Barns is a leisure and retail facility with free entry, currently including fishing lakes, crazy golf, a beauty salon, various antique shops, an art studio, clothes shops and restaurants. It hosts the mid and west-Suffolk show, which consists of arena demonstrations and displays, steam and classic car exhibitors and a range of stalls.

Stonham Aspal Football Club was founded in 1959 out of the Stonham Aspal School old pupils' club. It entered the Ipswich and District League Division 3 in the 1960/61 season. The League is now the Suffolk and Ipswich League. At the beginning of the 1970/71 season a reserve team was formed and entered in Division 5.

== Notable residents ==
- John Jenour (1465–1542), legal official and officer of the Court of Common Pleas
- William Betham (1749–1839), clergyman and antiquarian
- Mary Matilda Betham (1776–1852), diarist, poet, woman of letters and miniature-portrait painter
- Thomas Wonnacott (1869–1957), Archdeacon of Suffolk from 1938 to 1947
