= Jane Beetham Read =

British artist (c. 1773–1857)

Jane Read
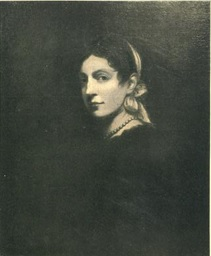
- John Opie, Jane Beetham, 1790–1800, Brompton Consumption Hospital collection
- Born: Jane Beetham c. 1773; London, England
- Died: 16 January 1857; London, England
- Education: Isabella Beetham; John Opie
- Known for: Silhouette and miniature portraits
- Spouse: John Read

Jane Beetham Read (c. 1773 – 16 January 1857) was an English portrait painter who began by working in the studio of her mother, Isabella Beetham, painting silhouette portraits in the 1790s. She studied under John Opie and exhibited her works at the Royal Academy of Arts between 1794 and 1797.

== Early life ==
Jane Beetham was born about 1773 to Edward and Isabella Beetham. She was the granddaughter of William Betham of Little Strickland in Cumbria, England. Mary Matilda Betham was her cousin.

Jane was the first of six children. Her brother, William was born in 1774. Her other siblings were Harriet, Charles, Cecilia, and Alfred. The Beethams first lived in Cow Lane, Clerkenwell, London and then Little Queen Street, Holborn, London. They moved to 26 and 27 Fleet Street in 1785. Her mother operated a silhouette portrait studio and her father sold his patented washing machines in the buildings that housed their residence. Her mother is considered one of the best silhouette artists of the time and she made a good living.

== Education and career ==
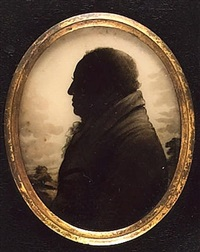
Jane Read, Unknown Gentleman

Read painted portraits from the 1790s until 1815. She painted silhouettes, generally on glass, for her mother from the early 1790s until 1797. Read's work was influenced by her mother's style and was often framed in pearwood or papier-mache. Her name (Miss Beetham) appeared on the sixth of seven trade labels issued by Isabella's business. The sixth label was used in the 1790s. In the late 1790s, Jane developed her own business with her own trade label. She added brass or ormolu frames as her career progressed.

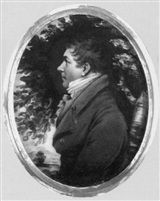
Jane Read, Unknown Gentleman

She studied painting under John Opie and was the only female student that he taught. He painted her portrait between 1790 and 1800. (Note: The portrait, which depicted her in a dark dress, with a light blue scarf covering her head, and against a black background, was bequeathed to the Brompton Consumption Hospital in 1871.) Using a painting made by Opie, Read painted a portrait of Dr. Priestly. They may have had a romantic relationship. It was a concern of her uncle, Rev. William Betham (1749–1839) who warned Isabella about Jane and Opie spending too much time together. His comments soured William's relationship with the Beetham's. Opie's wife, the former Mary Bunn, ran off with another man and the Opies were divorced on 23 December 1796. Opie was adamantly rejected when he asked Edward Beetham if he could marry Jane. Soon after, Jane married John Read.

As she began painting miniature portraits, she developed her own personal style. She often framed sitter's faces with dark foliage of landscaped backgrounds. She used a combination of techniques to depict bone structure, used stippling and hatching to capture the subject's features, and used a combination of thick and thin paint brush strokes. Her tools included two sizes of needles, for details, and two sizes of brushes. Read also created works using her own aquatint method.

Read exhibited portraits at the Royal Academy in London for four consecutive years, from 1794 to 1797. A total of 15 paintings were shown, (Note: Other exhibitions, from 1804 to 1815 were attributed to Jane, but were really shows of work of her cousin Mary Matilda Betham. It was said that she had the most exhibitions, nearly 20, of the silhouette artists in Britain, but there has been a miscalculation due to the confusion with the submissions by her cousin.) including Cordelia Angelica Read, A Lady Reading a Letter, Andromeda, Eloisa, and King Lear and Cordelia.

== Personal life ==
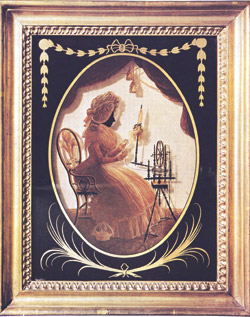
Jane Read, Portrait painted on glass of Mrs. Maria Fitzherbert, a widow who married George, Prince of Wales (later King George IV).

She married John Read, a solicitor from London around 1797 or in 1798. He was much older, wealthy, and eccentric. They had a daughter, Cordelia Angelica Read and lived on Lamb's Conduit Street. Jane's father died in 1809 and his estate was divided equally amongst her mother and the six Beetham children.

John died in 1847. Jane and Cordelia, known as the "old sisters" for their eccentric behavior, lived together in Stamford Street, London. The house was suggested to be haunted, according to newspaper articles. Cordelia remained single her entire life.

Jane died in London on 16 January 1857. Upon her death in December 1871, Cordelia left her mother's pictures and a legacy of £100,000 (equivalent to £12,356,000 in 2024) to the Brompton Consumption Hospital, which was used to build an extension to the hospital. A memorial slab was laid in her honor under a central window. The hospital also received the Read's art collection which included a number of paintings by Opie and by Beetham. Cordelia had lived as if she was destitute and was negligent in the care of material items. Many of the paintings needed to be refurbished and preserved, which was funded by selling off some of the paintings. The hospital kept the paintings that Opie painted of his mother, Jane, and her sisters Cecelia and Harriet. They sold the painting of Mary Betham Bligh, Admiral William Bligh's wife; The Card Players; and a self-portrait. Another £100,000 was given to a relative in accordance with Cordelia's will.
