= Jane Read =

Jane Read may refer to:

- Jane Beetham Read, English portrait painter
- Jane Maria Read, American poet and teacher
- Jane Reid, British evolutionary ecologist
- Jane Reed, British publishing executive
