= Joseph Durham =

English sculptor

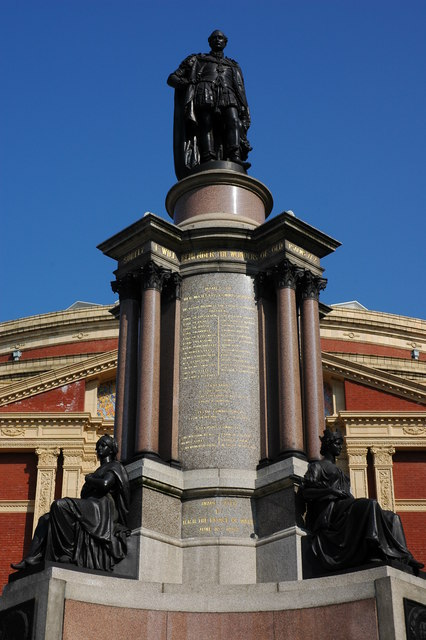
Memorial (1863) to the Exhibition of 1851 incorporating a statue of Prince Consort Albert; the memorial is in front of the Royal Albert Hall.

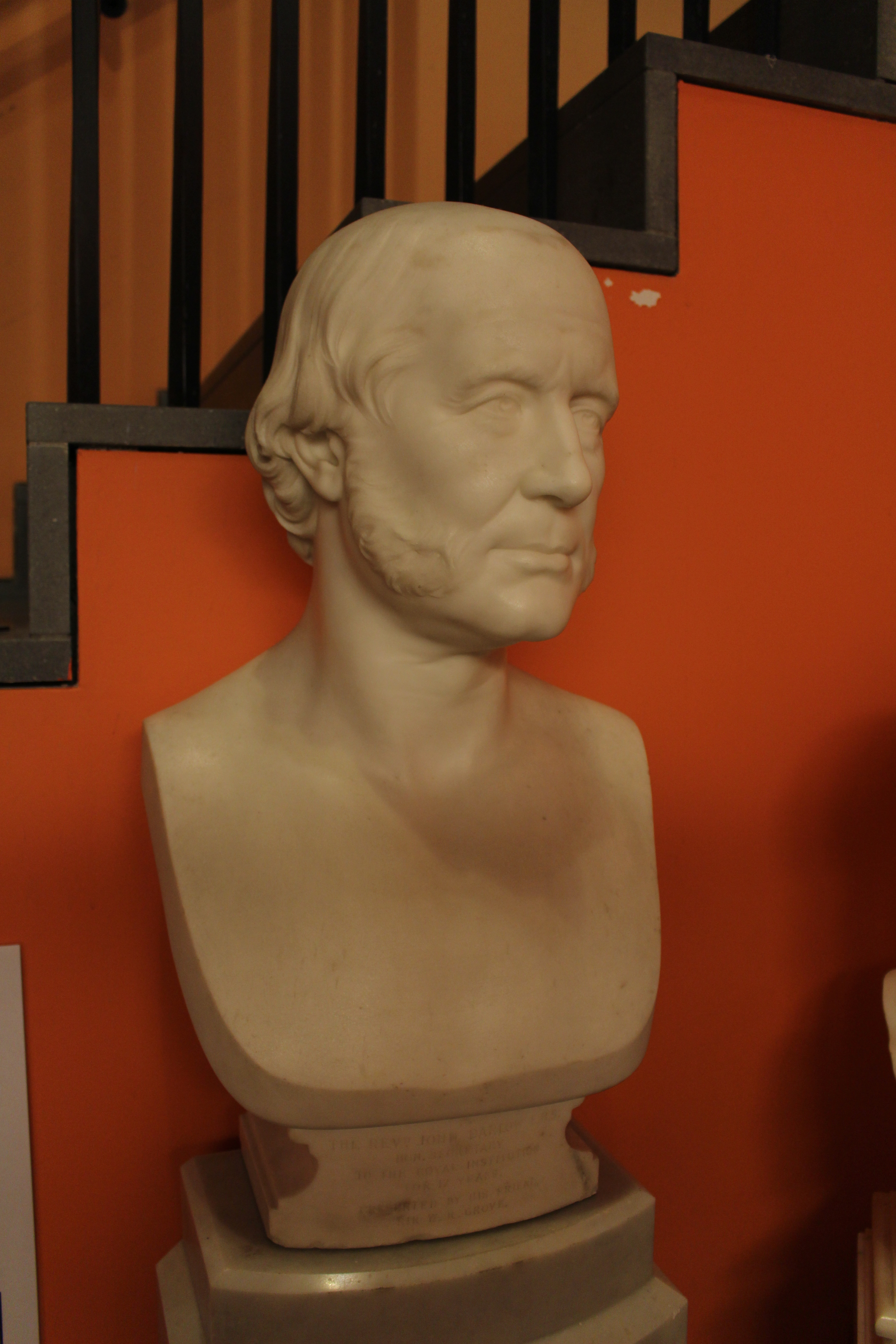
Bust of Rev John Barlow by Joseph Durham at the Royal Institution

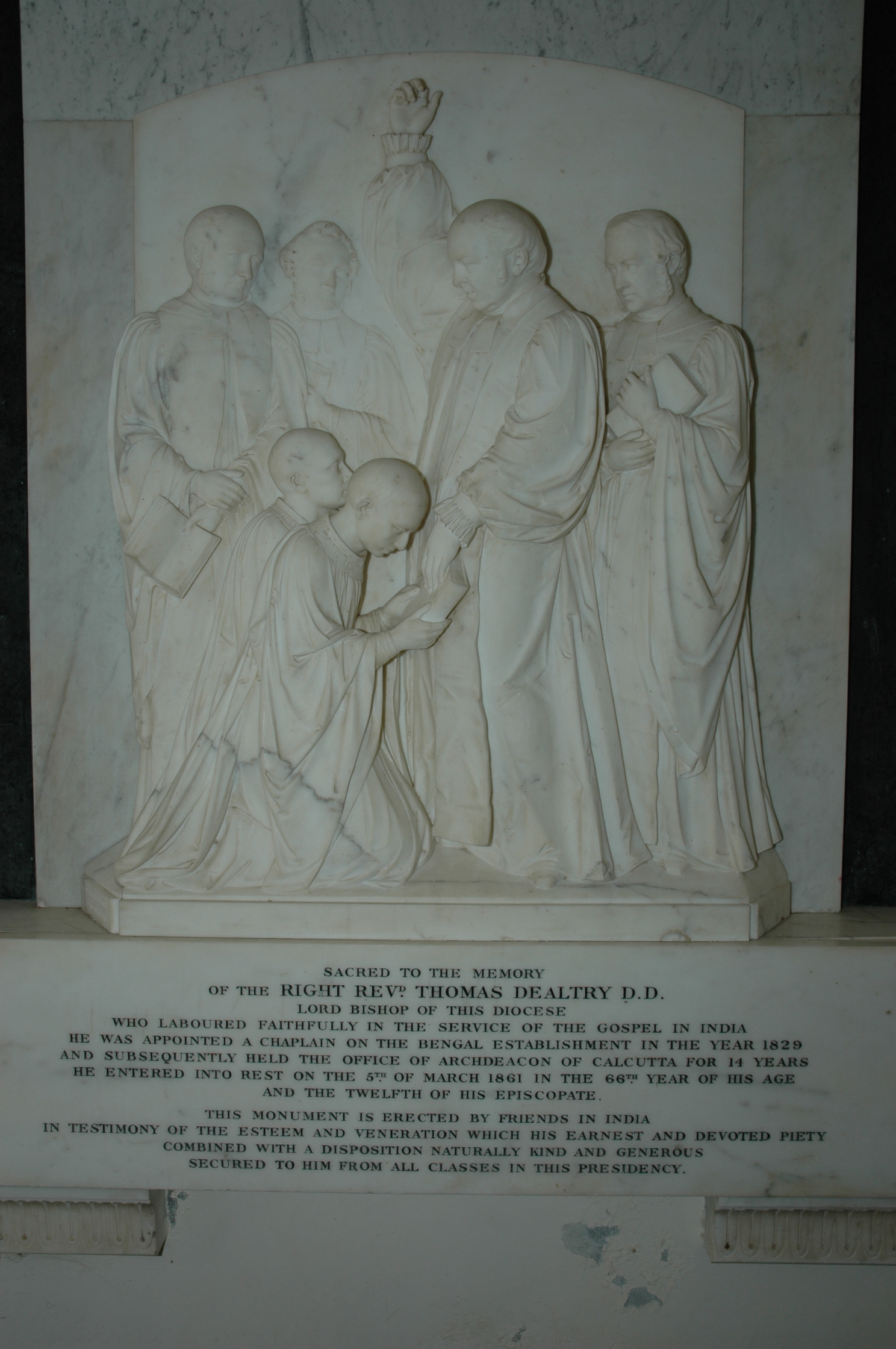
Memorial to Very Rev Thomas Dealtry in Madras Cathedral

Joseph Durham ARA (1814 – 27 October 1877) was an English sculptor.

== Life ==
Durham was born in London in 1814. Around 1827 he was apprenticed to John Francis. He later worked in the studio of E. H. Baily for three years, and exhibited his first piece of sculpture in the Royal Academy in 1835.

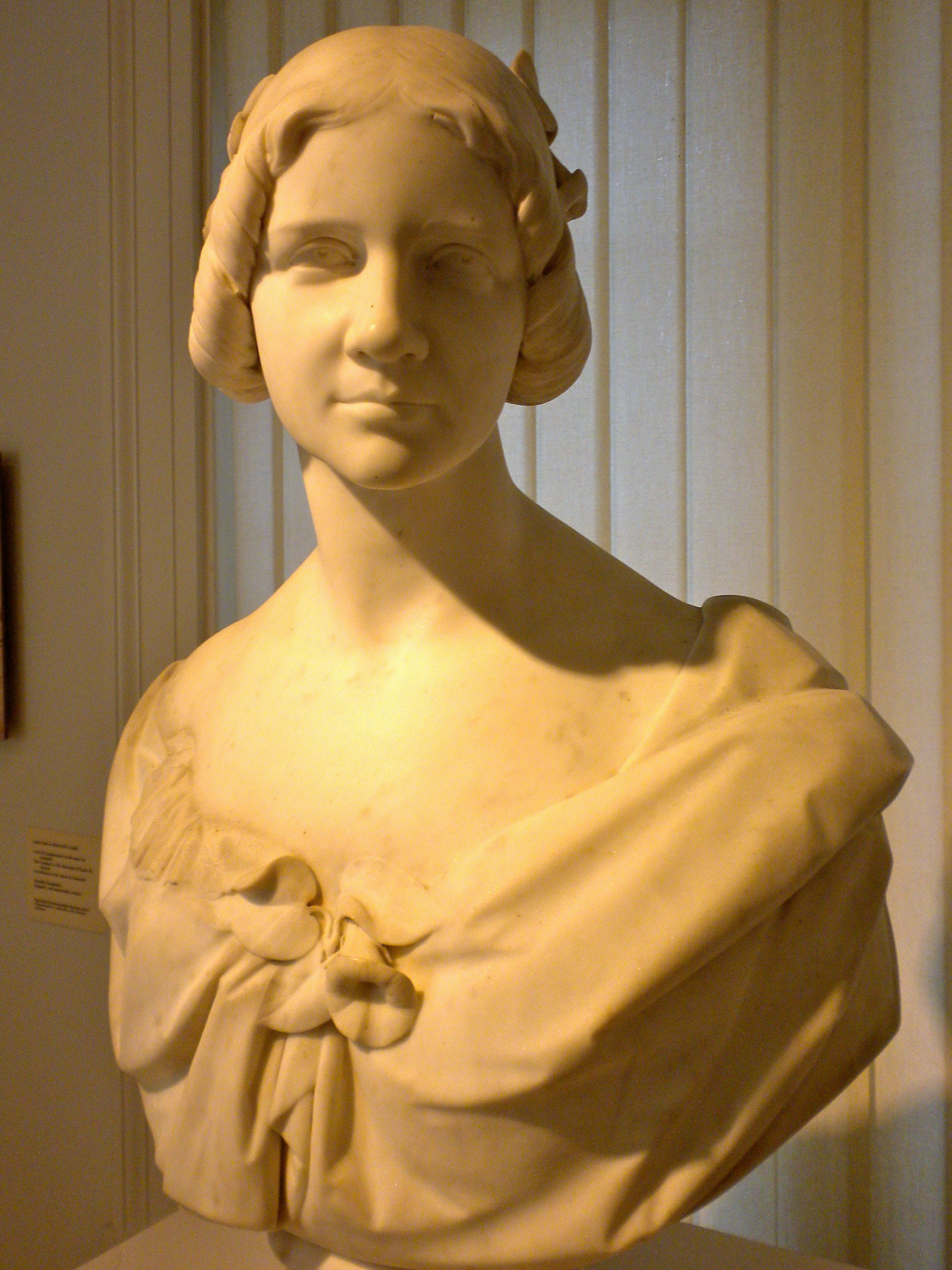
Bust of Jenny Lind

His busts of Jenny Lind (1848) and of Queen Victoria (1856) attracted a great deal of attention the former proving particularly popular when reproduced in Parian ware by Copeland. A statue by him of Sir Francis Crossley was erected at Halifax. He executed four statues for the portico of the University of London in Burlington Gardens.

In 1858 he won the commission for the Memorial to the Great Exhibition of 1851, which ultimately included the electrotyped statue of Albert, Prince Consort following Albert's death in 1861. Durham had originally planned that the main figure should be a representation of Britannia. The Memorial was erected in the gardens of the Royal Horticultural Society at Kensington in 1863, and was moved to a site near the Royal Albert Hall in around 1890. A commission from the Duke of Buccleuch, a statue of the Duke's younger brother – John Douglas Montagu Douglas Scott – was erected in Dunchurch and unveiled by the Duke in September 1867.

Between 1835 and 1878 Durham exhibited 126 pieces of sculpture at the Royal Academy and six at the British Institution. He was noted for his figures of boys engaged in sporting activities. A porcelain reproduction of his sculpture Go to Sleep was distributed as a prize to members of the Art Union of London in 1865. He became an associate of the Royal Academy in 1866. One of his major works was a Leander and the Syren, exhibited at the Royal Academy in 1875. His statues entitled Hermione and Alastor were purchased for the Mansion House.

He died after a long illness, on 27 October 1877, at his home at 21 Devonshire Street, London. He is buried in Kensal Green Cemetery.

== Works ==
- Bust of Jenny Lind (1848) exhibited at Royal Academy
- Bust of Edward Sabine (1859) Royal Society of London
- Statue of William Caxton (1859) in Westminster Palace Hotel
- Statue of Frank Crossley (1861) in Halifax
- Memorial to Rev Thomas Dealtry (1861) in Madras Cathedral in India
- Bust of James Bunning (1863) Guildhall, London
- Statue of Prince Albert (1863) in Guernsey
- Bust of William Thackeray (1864) in the Garrick Club
- Statue of Prince Albert (1865) in the Agricultural College in Farningham
- Statues of Queen Victoria, Queen Anne and Queen Elizabeth (1866) Public Record Office, London
- Statues of Robert Stephenson and Euclid (1867) Oxford University Museum
- Bust of Lord Palmerston (1867) Guildhall, London (destroyed in the blitz)
- Bust of Lord Romilly (1867) in Public Record Office
- Statue of Lord John Scott (1867) in Dunchurch
- Statues of Isaac Newton, John Milton and Joseph Bentham (1869) on facade of Burlington House
- Bust of Leigh Hunt (1869) Chelsea Town Hall
- Bust of Sir George Pollock (1870) National Portrait Gallery, London
- Memorial to William Jerdan FSA (1874) in the churchyard of Bushey
- Bust of Rev John Barlow (1875) in Royal Institution
- Bust of William Hogarth (1875) in Leicester Square
- Bust of Edward Gibbon Wakefield (1876) in Colonial Office, London
- Bust of Sir William Grave (1876) exhibited at Royal Academy
- Bust of Thomas Webster RA (1877) exhibited at Royal Academy
