= Bentham (surname) =

Bentham is a surname. Notable people with the surname include:

- Billy Bentham, English rugby league footballer of the 1920s
- Charles Bentham, 18th-century English shipwright in Dutch service
- Craig Bentham (born 1985), English footballer
- Edward Bentham (1707–1776), English theologian
- Ethel Bentham (1861–1931), Irish doctor, politician and suffragette
- George Bentham (1800–1884), English botanist
- George Bentham (1843–1911), British operatic tenor
- George Jackson Bentham (1863–1929), British politician
- Howard Bentham (born 1965), British radio personality
- Isaac Bentham (1886–1917), British water polo player
- James Bentham (c. 1709–1794), English clergyman and historian of Ely Cathedral
- Jeremy Bentham (1748–1832), English philosopher and jurist who developed utilitarianism
- John Bentham (born 1963), English association footballer
- Joseph Bentham (1593/94–1671), Church of England minister and writer on theology
- Lee Bentham (born 1970), Canadian former racing driver
- Mary Sophia Bentham (c. 1765–1858), British botanist
- Nat Bentham (1900–1975), English rugby league footballer
- Percy George Bentham (1883–1936), English sculptor
- Phil Bentham (born 1971), English rugby league referee
- Rosie Bentham (born 2001), English actress
- Samuel Bentham (1757–1831), English mechanical engineer
- Stan Bentham (1915–2002), English association footballer
- Thomas Bentham (1513–1578), Bishop of Coventry
- Trevor Bentham (1943–2025), English stage manager and screenwriter

Fictional characters

- Jeremy Bentham (Lost), another name for the character John Locke in Lost
- Karla Bentham, a character in the British television series Waterloo Road

== See also ==
- Betham (surname)
