= Thomas Tomkins (disambiguation) =

Thomas Tomkins was a Welsh composer.

Thomas Tomkins may also refer to:

- Thomas Tomkins (martyr) (died 1555), English Protestant martyr
- Thomas Tomkins (calligrapher) (1743–1816), English calligrapher
- Thomas Tomkins (MP) (c.1605–1674), English politician
