= John Smart =

English painter (1741–1811)

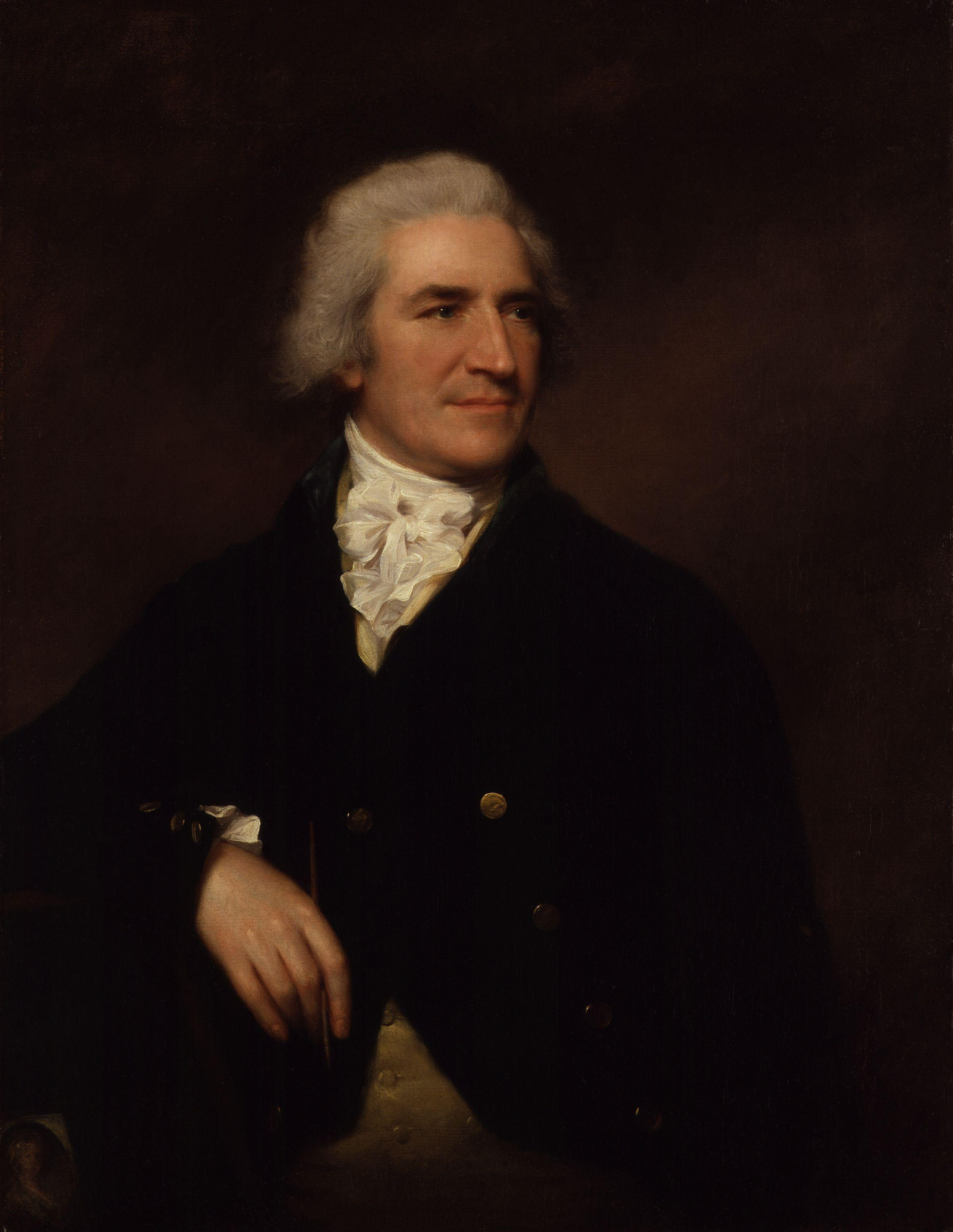
- c. 1795–1800 portrait
- Born: 20 January 1741; Norfolk, England
- Died: 1 May 1811 (aged 70); London, England
- Known for: Painter of portrait miniatures

John Smart (1 May 1741 – 1 May 1811) was an English painter who specialised in portrait miniatures. He was a contemporary of Richard Cosway, George Engleheart, William Wood and Richard Crosse.

== Biography ==
Smart was born in Norfolk. His father was a wigmaker and hairdresser. It is recorded that in 1755, he was runner up to Richard Cosway in a drawing competition for under-14s held by the Society for the Encouragement of Arts, Manufactures and Commerce. In the same year he began attending the new drawing school of William Shipley in London, along with Cosway and Richard Crosse.

He exhibited at the Society of Artists, in London, from 1762, onwards. and became its president in 1778. Smart had a thriving business in London. His sitters were often young, wealthy and fashion-forward, some of them Macaronis. Smart's miniatures during this period commonly depict the contemporary fashion craze for pink or lilac-colored hair powder.

He went to India in 1788 and established himself at Madras, where he painted miniatures for both British and native Indian sitters. For a time, Smart was employed as personal court miniaturist by Mohammed Ali Walajah, the Nawab of Arcot. The Nawab was very slow to pay Smart and still owed him a large amount of money when Smart left India in 1795.

Smart left India in 1795, returning by way of South Africa, where he produced a number of sketches. He reestablished his miniature business in London in 1797, latterly in Fitzroy Street, where he died in 1811.

He was a man of simple habits and a member of the Society of Sandemanians.

== Work ==
Smart mainly painted watercolour miniatures on ivory, and often clearly signed and dated his work. A number of his preparatory drawings and sketches survive.

His work is entirely different from that of Cosway, quiet and grey in its colouring, with the flesh tints elaborated with subtlety. He possessed a great knowledge of anatomy, and his portraits are drawn with greater anatomical accuracy than those of any miniature painter of his time.

The most important collection of Smart's work was given by John W. and Martha Jane Phillips Starr to the Nelson-Atkins Museum of Art. The Starr collection includes a signed and dated miniature for each year of Smart's career, from 1760 to 1811, enabling scholars to view the full progression of Smart's style and technique as well as the changing fashions of the period.

Many of his pencil drawings still exist in the possession of the descendants of a great friend of his only sister. Several of his miniatures are in Australia and belong to a cadet branch of the family.

Smart taught portrait painting to Isabella Beetham, who was one of Britain's finest silhouette artists in the 18th century.

== Personal life ==
Smart married three times and had seven children, including two children out of wedlock. His natural son John Smart Jr. followed his father's profession and became a miniature painter, painting mostly in India after finishing his apprenticeship with his father. John Jr. died of a fever in Madras in 1809, aged 23.

== Gallery ==
Portrait of Hon. Miss Eliza Booth, dated 1766. Victoria & Albert Museum

Portrait of Unknown Man, dated 1767. Victoria & Albert Museum

Portrait of Unknown Woman, dated 1779. Victoria & Albert Museum

Portrait of Unknown Woman, dated 1780. Victoria & Albert Museum

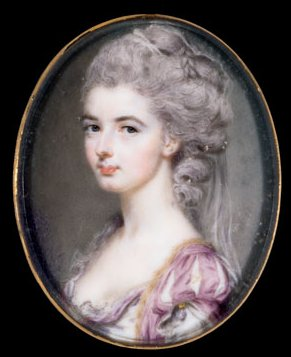
Watercolor on ivory portrait miniature of a lady, 1782, 5.1 x 4.1 cm, Cincinnati Art Museum

Portrait of a Member of the Tayler Family, dated 1787. Frame with bracelet fitting. Victoria & Albert Museum

Sir Robert Brooke, probably c. 1788
