= John Barlow (priest) =

Anglican cleric

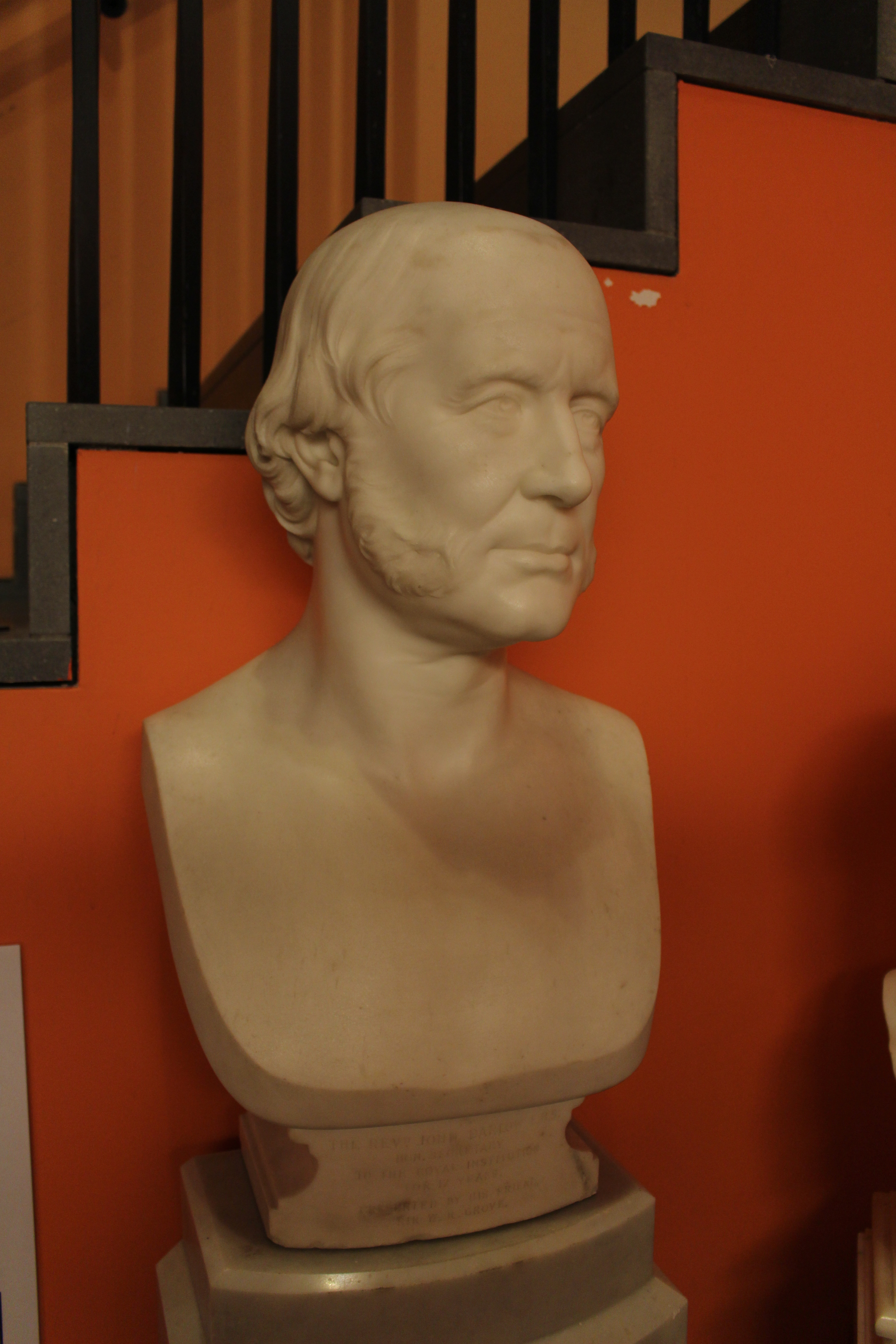
Bust of Barlow by Joseph Durham at the Royal Institution

John Barlow FRS (1799–1869) was an Anglican cleric and Secretary of the Royal Institution of Great Britain (1843–1860) and later Chaplain-in-Ordinary at Kensington Palace.

== Life ==
John Barlow was born on 20 November 1798 in South Mimms, Hertfordshire, to his father Thomas William (1777), a Clerk. He attended Blundell's School, after which in 1816 he started attending Trinity College, Cambridge. He would earn his B.A in 1820 and graduate with his M.A in 1823. In 1822 he became the curate of the parish in Uckfield, Sussex. On 23 March 1823 he was ordained as a priest. From 1830 to 1843 he was rector to the parish in Little Bowden, Northamptonshire. He was absent for a large part of his time in this position. His brother, George Hilaro Barlow (1824), would act as curate for the parish in his absence. In 1824 he married Cecilia Anne Law.

== Career ==
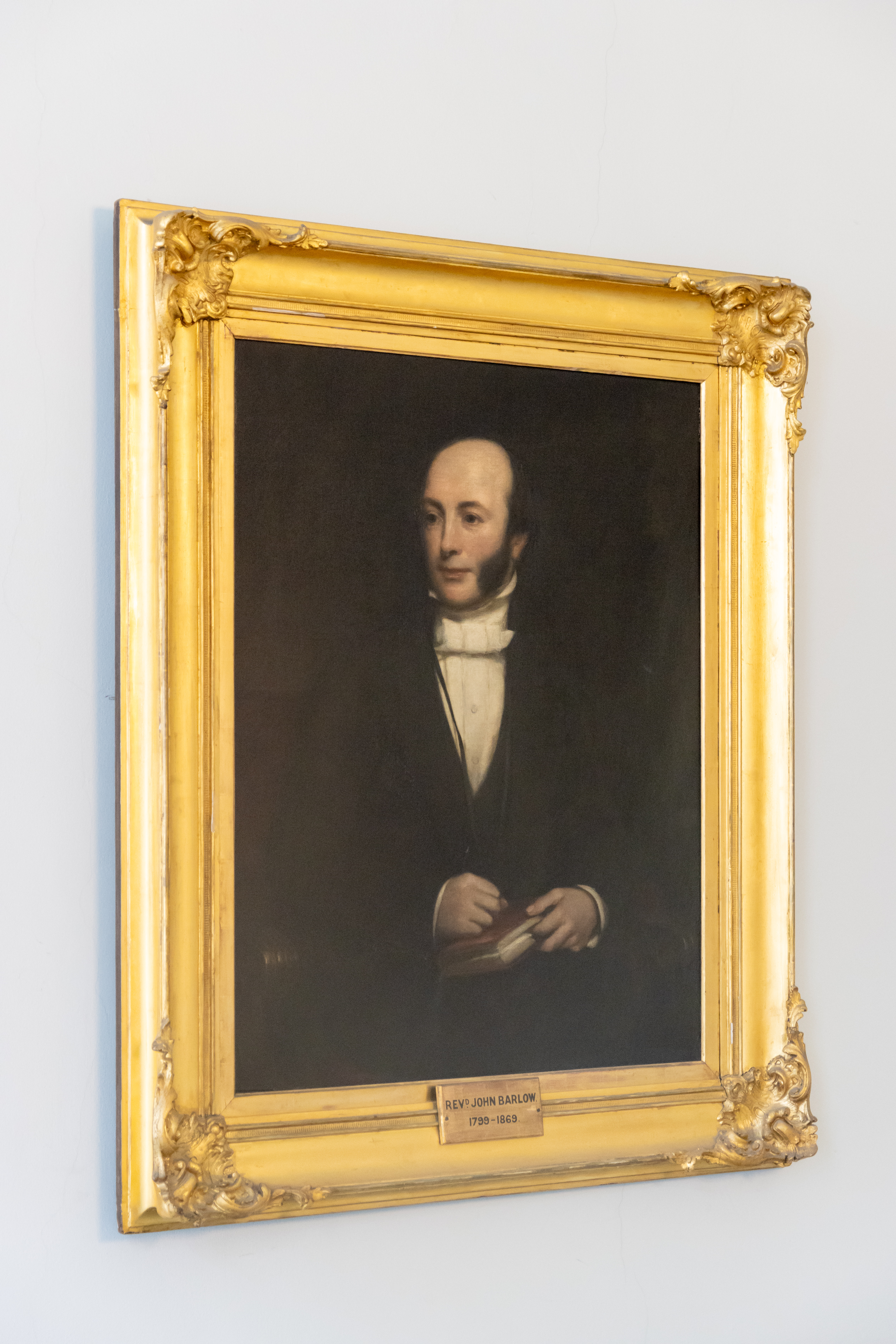
Portrait at the Royal Institution

In 1832 John Barlow joined the Royal Institution of Great Britain (Ri). He would serve many positions inside the RI, including:

- Manager (1838)
- Secretary of the Lectures Committee (1841) where he succeeded Michael Faraday (1791- 1867).
- Honorary Secretary of the Ri (1843-1860)

While serving as the honorary secretary Barlow made administrative changes. While in this position he discovered long-term fraud committed by the assistant secretary at the time, Joseph Fincher. His administrative changes included procedures to prevent fraud. He also give lectures of the practical applications of science.

Barlow was elected into the Royal Society in 1834 and served at the Secretary of the Zoological Society of London from 1837 to 1838.

Barlow's social personality led him to host several dinners and holiday events prior to discourses in his own home. During many of the gatherings Barlow was said to be attempting to recruit significant figures to join him at the Royal Institution.

Barlow's close friendship with Michael Faraday allowed him to work with him on several occasions and successfully is noted to have:

- Increased the number of lady members such as Angela Burdett-Coutts, 1st Baroness Burdett-Coutts, notably one of the wealthiest women in all of England in 1837 and the Duchess of Northumberland, wife of the President of the Royal Institution. The rise of women in the Royal Institution called for changes such as the inclusion of these lady members attending lectures and Friday evening discourses.
- Alongside Faraday worked to return the significant importance to the secretary positions in the Ri that had been diminished during Edmund Robert Daniell's time as secretary.
- Also found Joseph Fincher guilty of defrauding the Ri and took over the duties of assistant secretary following Fincher's dismissal.

Barlow published some of his research in "The Discovery of the Vital Principle or Physiology of Man" (1838).

Barlow published several books in the collection Small Books on Great Subjects. These include On the Connection between Physiology and Intellectual Science (1942) and "On Man's Power Over Himself to Prevent or Control Insanity" (1843) the latter of which discusses management of the insane.

In 1851 Barlow became minister of the Duke Street Chapel, London and from 1854 to 1859, he was Chaplain-in-Ordinary at Kensington Palace.

== Sources ==
- Copy of "On Man's Power Over Himself to Prevent or Control Insanity" available to view on Google Books
- The Royal Institution holds a portrait, a bust and some photographs of John Barlow.
- The Royal Institution holds the John Barlow Collection (Ref. GB 0116), being the papers of John Barlow including scrapbooks containing letters, newspaper cuttings, biographical notes, autographs, reports and photographs, c1750-1875 (Ref JB1-JB2)
- Other papers of John Barlow are located at: Lambeth Palace Library (reference: MS 1379).
