= John Miers (artist) =

English painter

John Miers (1756–1821) was the most famous profilist or painter of silhouettes in Britain.

== Career ==
Born in Leeds, he established a business in the Lower-head Row in the city. Miers later moved to Edinburgh, and operated in various Northern towns before setting up studios in The Strand, London around 1788. Here he operated a very successful business recording customers profiles in "3 minute sittings". His miniatures were produced on ivory or plaster and feature delicate shading to show detail of the hair and clothes. The sitter's face was recorded as a black silhouette.

In 1785, Miers writes on the back of one of his images promoting the process: “preserves the most exact Symmetry and animated expression of the Features, much Superior to any other Method. Time of sitting one minute. N.B. He keeps the original Shades, and can supply those he has once taken with any number of Copies. Those who have Shades by them may have them reduced to any Size, and dress’d in the present taste.”

Miers specialty was painting unrelieved black on plaster. His name was first mentioned in the London Directory of 1792. At the end of his life in 1821, Miers is considered to have amassed 100,000 profiles in his studio.

== Personal life ==
Miers was well acquainted with Robert Burns as Burn's described in a letter suggesting his friend Robert Ainslee sit for a profile painting by John Miers so that he can hang "Lord Glencairn, the Dr. and you (Ainslee), in trio, over my new chimney-piece that is to be." Burns had his own likeness profiled by the artist in 1787. Miers also painted a silhouette of Agnes Broun, Burns' mother.

== See also ==
- Isabella Beetham, 18th century silhouette artist
