= John Cox Dillman Engleheart =

English painter (1784–1862)

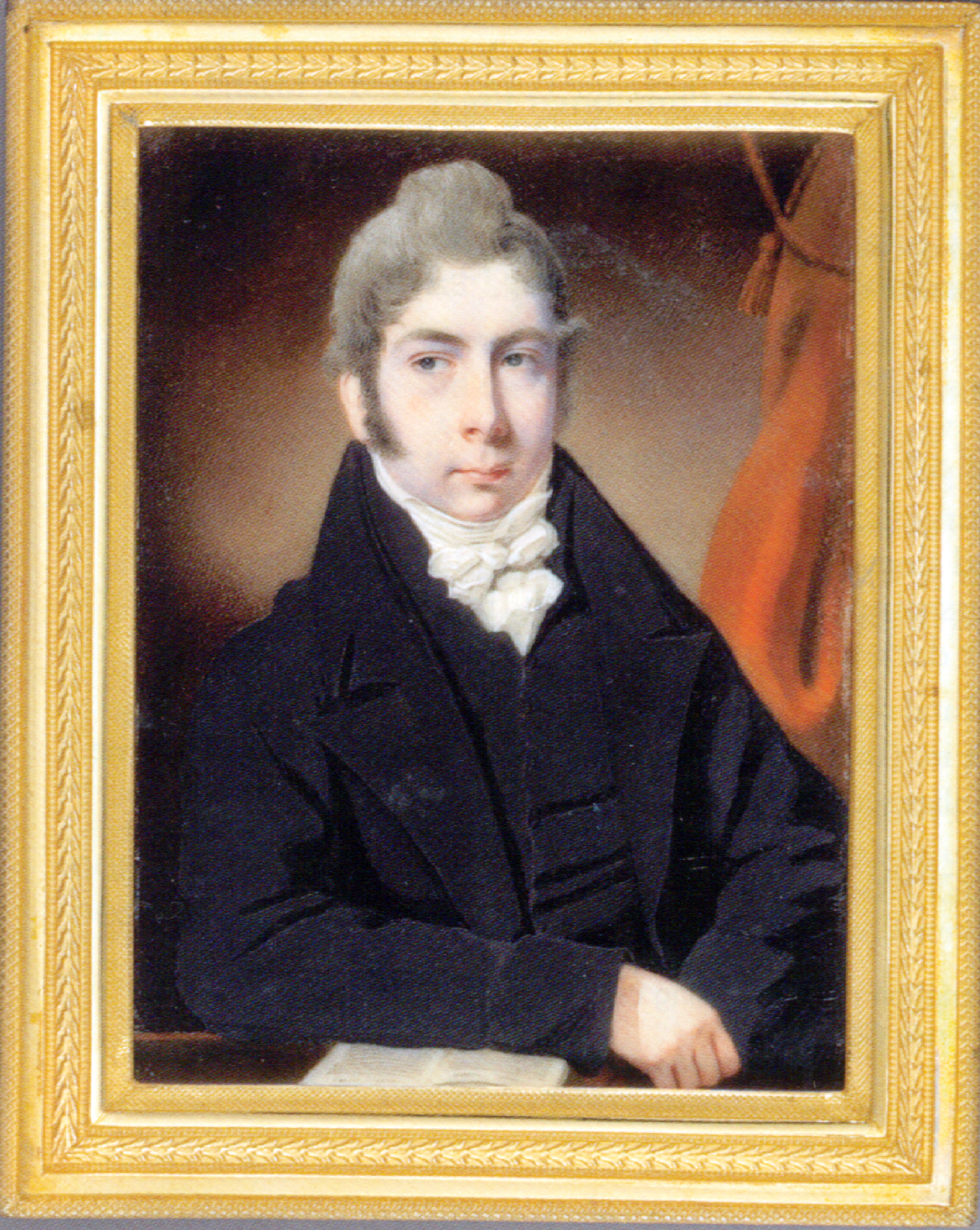
Portrait of Mr. E.H. Boillie by John Cox Dillman Engleheart, 1811

John Cox Dillman Engleheart (1784–1862) was an English miniature painter.

== Life ==
Engleheart was the nephew of the miniature painter George Engleheart. He entered his uncle's studio at the age of fourteen. He first exhibited at the Royal Academy in 1801, and went on to show a total of 157 works. He was a man of substantial means, and in his time a very popular painter, but his health broke down when he was 44 years old, and he had to relinquish the pursuit of his profession. He lived at Tunbridge Wells for some years and died there in 1862.
