= Thomas Tomkins (calligrapher) =

Thomas Tomkins (1743–1816) was an English calligrapher.

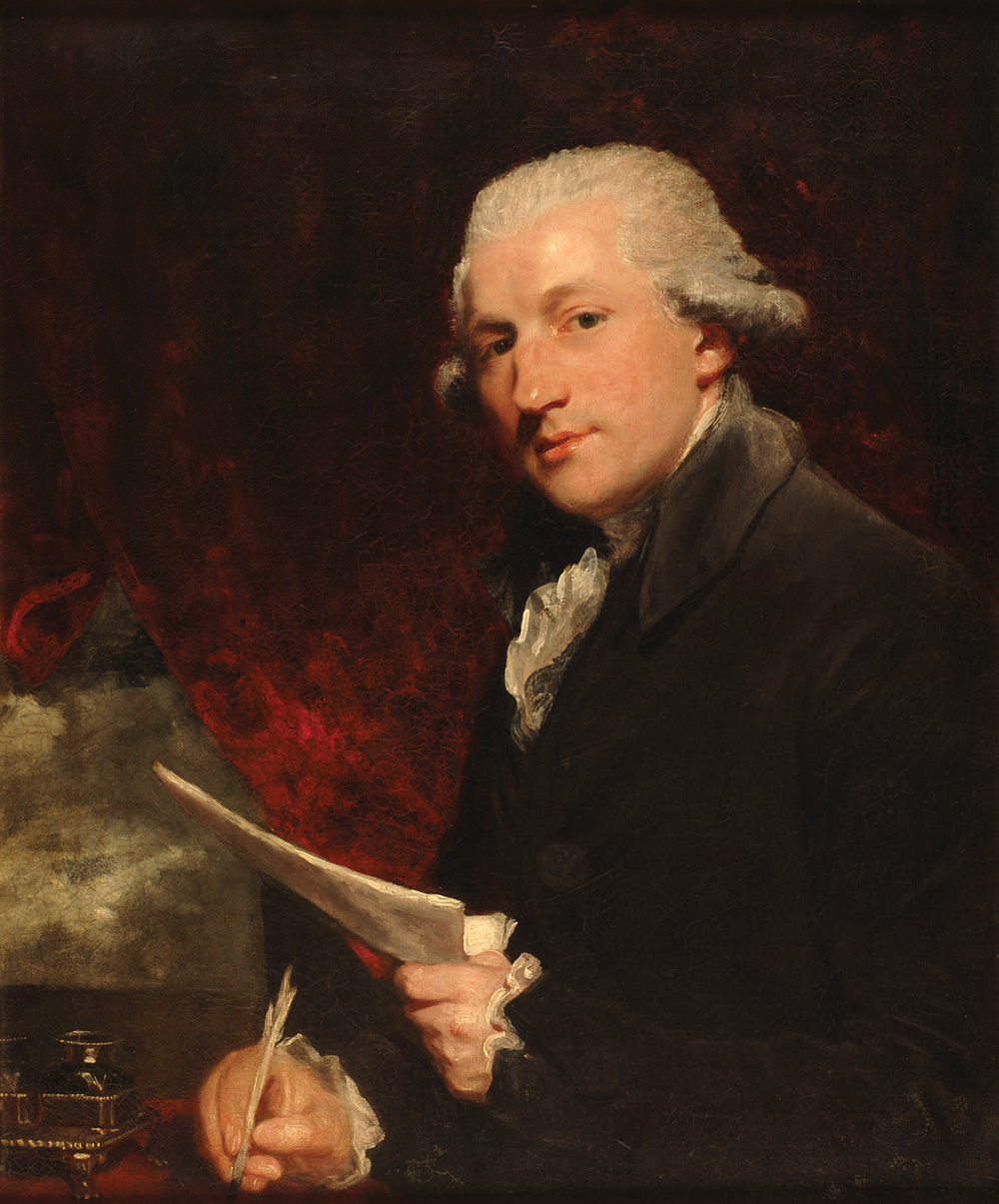
Thomas Tomkins, 1789 portrait by Joshua Reynolds. Tomkins bequeathed this painting to the City of London.

== Life ==
He kept for many years a writing school in Foster Lane, London. Tomkins was a friend of Samuel Johnson and Sir Joshua Reynolds, and used to demonstrate how he could draw a perfect circle with the pen; but was ridiculed by Isaac D'Israeli. He died in Sermon Lane, Doctors' Commons, in September 1816. His partner in the writing academy, John Reddall, survived till 17 August 1834.

== Works ==
Among examples from his pen are:

- A transcript of the charter granted by Charles II to the Irish Society, containing 150 folio pages;
- ornamental titles to books, particularly Thomas Macklin's Bible (8 vols. 1800–16), James Thomson's The Seasons, and the Houghton Collection of Prints;
- a transcript of Horatio Nelson's letter announcing his victory at the battle of the Nile—this was engraved and published;
- titles to three volumes of manuscript music presented to the king by Thomas Linley the elder;
- honorary freedoms presented to celebrated generals and admirals for their victories (1776–1816)—framed duplicates of these are preserved among the city archives; and
- addresses to their majesties on many public occasions, particularly from the Royal Academy.

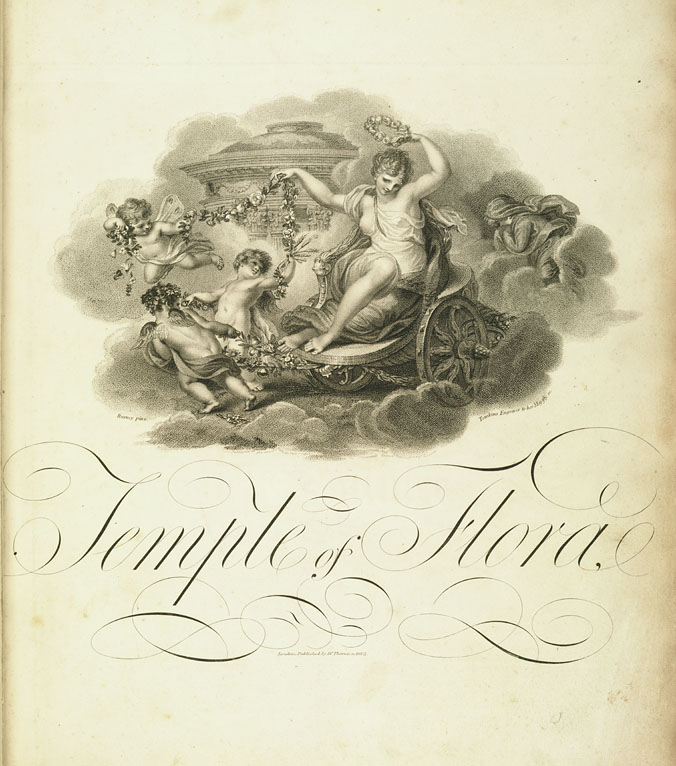
Title page to Temple of Flora (1812) by Robert John Thornton, calligraphy by Thomas Tomkins.

Tomkins published:

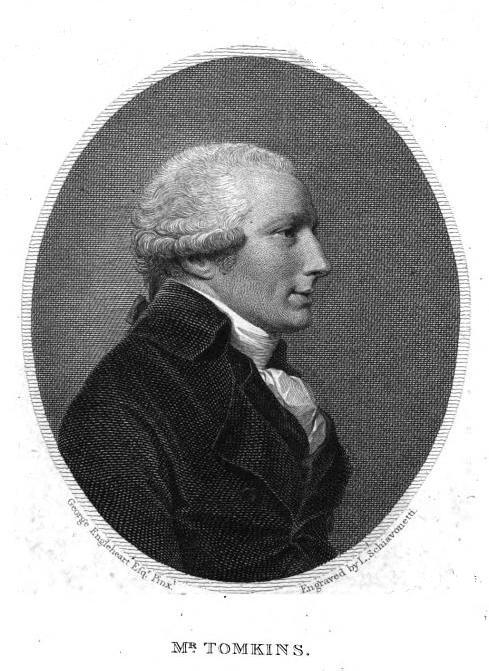
Engraving of Thomas Tomkins after George Engleheart, by Lewis Schiavonetti, prefixed to Tomkins's Rays of Genius (1806).

- The Beauties of Writing, exemplified in a variety of plain and ornamental penmanship. Designed to excite Emulation in this valuable Art, London, 1777; again London, 1808–9, and 1844.
- Alphabets written for the improvement of youth in Round, Text, and Small Hands, 1779.
- Rays of Genius, collected to enlighten the rising generation, 2 vols., London, 1806.
- Poems on various Subjects; selected to enforce the Practice of Virtue; and with a view to comprise … the Beauties of English Poetry, London, 1807.

== Notes ==
Attribution

This article incorporates text from a publication now in the public domain: Lee, Sidney, ed. (1899). "Tomkins, Thomas (1743-1816)". Dictionary of National Biography. Vol. 57. London: Smith, Elder & Co.
