= Mary Matilda Betham =

English diarist and painter (1776–1852)

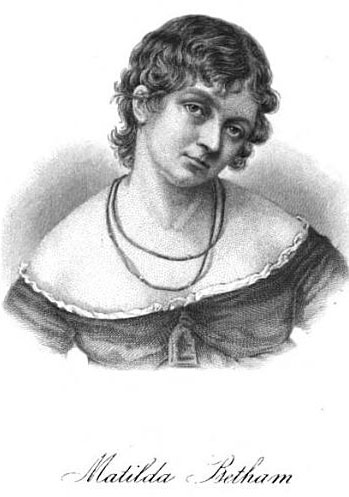
- Matilda Betham, estimate 1794–1820
- Born: 16 November 1776; Stradbroke, Suffolk, England
- Died: 30 September 1852 (aged 75); London, England
- Resting place: Highgate Cemetery, London
- Education: William Betham; William Wordsworth; Agostino Isola
- Known for: Poet, woman of letters, and miniature portrait painter

Mary Matilda Betham, known by family and friends as Matilda Betham (16 November 1776 – 30 September 1852), was an English diarist, poet, woman of letters, and miniature portrait painter. She exhibited at the Royal Academy of Arts from 1804 to 1816. Her first of four books of verses was published in 1797. For six years, she researched notable historical women around the world and published A Biographical Dictionary of the Celebrated Women of Every Age and Country in 1804.

== Early life ==
Betham was the eldest of 14 children born to Rev. William Betham of Stonham Aspal, Suffolk and Mary Damant of Eye, Suffolk. Her father researched and published books on royal and English baronetage genealogy. He was also a schoolmaster and the Anglican rector of Stoke Lacy, Herefordshire.

Betham was baptised on 1 January 1777 and raised in Stonham Aspal. She is said to have had a happy childhood marred by poor health. She was largely self-educated in her father's library, but gleaned from it and his occasional tutelage an interest in history and literature. She claimed that a key loss of not having attending a school was that she did not learn the art of defending herself. From a young age, Betham would recite poetry and read of plays and history voraciously. She was sent out for sewing lessons "to prevent my too strict application to books." Betham learned to speak French during trips to London. Her younger brother was William Betham (1779–1853).

As the family grew, family furnishings were sold to support it, and although she was not pushed out of the home, Betham felt the need to support herself and taught herself to paint miniature portraits. It was during a trip to her Uncle Edward Beetham (Note: Edward Beetham changed his surname from Betham to Beetham.) in London that she was inspired to pursue painting and explore her literary talents. The family lived in a centre of literary and artistic activity. While visiting the Beethams she met the artist John Opie, who was instructing her cousin, Jane Beetham, and received lessons from him during her stay. Betham was also encouraged to explore her literary talents by her uncle, who was a publisher. She studied with William Wordsworth and Italian with Agostino Isola in Cambridge in 1796.

== Adulthood ==
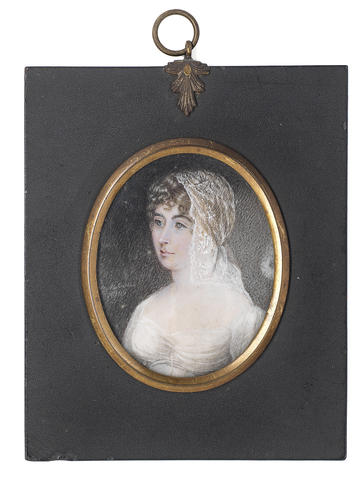
Mary Matilda Betham, Sara Coleridge (Mrs. Samuel Taylor Coleridge), portrait miniature, 1809

In 1797, Betham wrote Elegies, and Other Small Poems, which included Italian poems translated into English and Arthur & Albina, a Druid ballad. She received a tribute for this from Samuel Taylor Coleridge, who wrote To Matilda from a Stranger in 1802, comparing her to Sappho and encouraging her to continue writing poetry.} Others who encouraged her were Lady Charlotte Bedingfield and her family.

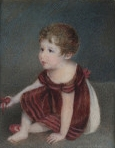
Portrait of Herbert Southey, 1809

Betham painted pleasant, delicate portraits, which she exhibited at the Royal Academy of Arts from 1804 to 1816 (Note: The 1804 to 1815 exhibitions have been attributed to her cousin Jane Beetham, but were really shows by Mary Matilda Betham.) as a way to be financially independent from her parents who had many children to raise. Among the dozens of exhibited portraits were those of the Harriot Beauclerk, Duchess of St Albans, the poet George Dyer, Countess of Dysart, and Betham's father and other family members.

In 1804, she published A Biographical Dictionary of the Celebrated Women of Every Age and Country, the culmination of six years of research. It included short biographies of Mary Magdalene, Cleopatra, East Indian Bowanny, Madame Roland, and other notable historical women from around the world. Four years later she published her second book of poetry. Betham was also a close friend of Robert Southey and his wife, of Anna Laetitia Barbauld and her husband, and of Charles and his sister Mary. Other acquaintances in that period were Opie, Frances Holcroft, Hannah More, Germaine de Staël, and Samuel Taylor Coleridge. She made portraits of the Coleridges and the Southeys and wrote a verse for the marriage of Emma Isola, an adopted daughter of Lamb, to Edward Moxon.

Other works Betham published in magazines anonymously, while also giving public Shakespeare readings in London. Her best-received poem was Lay of Marie (1816), based upon the story of Marie de France, the medieval poet, written in couplets, included a scholarly appendix, as recommended by Southey, who said she was "likely to be the best poetess of her age."

However, Betham gave up her literary career and returned to the country after a series of aggravations, a breakdown of health, misfortunes, and family circumstances. For instance, advertisements to promote her book spelled her heroine's name Mario and misspelled her name, many printed books had become mildewed, and she was in financial distress as the result of the advertising and publication costs. She became destitute and tried to gain employment painting portraits, which was difficult because her clothing had become shabby.

By 17 June 1819, Betham had been put in a mental asylum by her family after she had suffered a mental breakdown, but she was acting and conversing normally again in 1820. Betham stated that she had suffered a "nervous fever" after the hard work and emotional stress of getting Lay of Marie published, and that she felt she was unjustly put into an institution without examination or treatment. Betham moved to London on her release and kept her address a secret. George Dyer successfully applied for assistance for her from the Royal Literary Fund, which had been established to aid authors in 1790 by David Williams.

Betham championed women's rights, called for greater participation of women in parliamentary affairs, and wrote Challenge to Women, Being an Intended Address from Ladies of Different Parts of the Kingdom, Collectively to Caroline, Queen of Great Britain and Ireland to address charges levelled against Queen Carolina during her acrimonious marriage to King George IV, calling for women to support her against state persecution and sign a petition on her behalf.

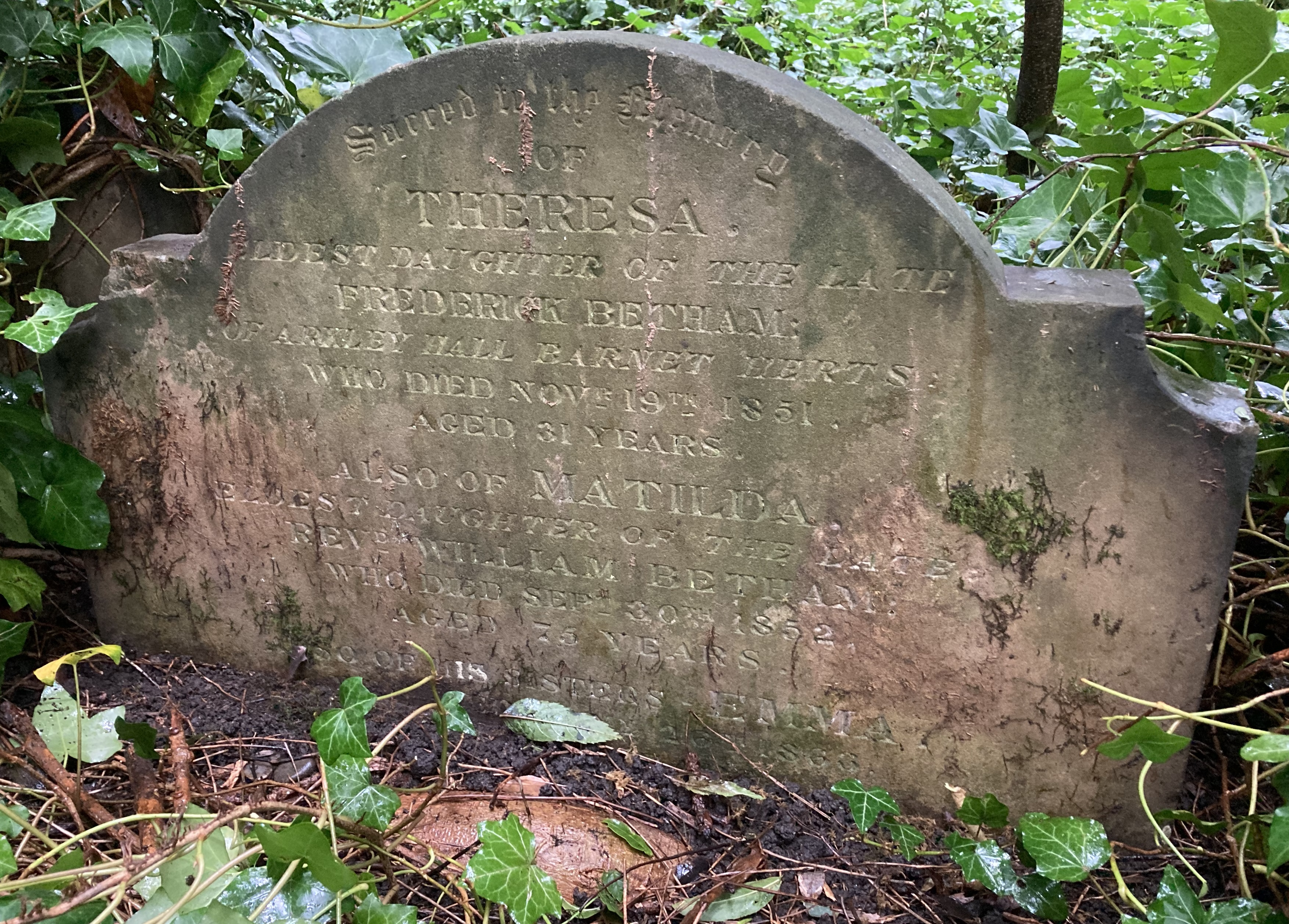
Grave of Mary Matilda Betham in Highgate Cemetery

Betham was put into an asylum again in 1822 by her family. In the 1830s she lived with her parents in Islington. About 1836, Betham expressed sorrow at the death of several of her siblings in Sonnets and Verses, To Relations and their Connexions. A tale of two poisoned men was published in Dramatic Sketch in 1836. The manuscript for Hermoden, a play that she wrote in the late 1830s was lost and remains unpublished. She was reported to be studying at the British Museum in the 1830s.

- Though Age advances, strength decays,
- Enjoyments come a thousand ways—
- The bending trunk of Life's old tree
- Still blossoms forth abundantly!

— Mary Matilda Betham

In her later years Betham returned to London. and maintained her friendships, love of literature, wit, and her entertaining conversation and presence. However, it was hard for her to make a living. She was unable to obtain promised assistance in getting her manuscript for Crow-quill Flights printed. Betham had been rebuked when she asked friends for copies of poems that she had given them. Some of her manuscripts were accidentally burned at Stonham.

Betham died 30 September 1852 at 52 Burton Street in London, and was buried on the western side of Highgate Cemetery with her eldest sister, Theresa, who had died a year earlier. Some of her letters, along with a biographical sketch, appear in Six Life Stories of Famous Women (1880) by her niece, the novelist Matilda Betham-Edwards, but Betham-Edwards also burnt many of Betham's letters. Edwards published a biography of her in Friendly Faces of Three Nationalities.

== Works ==
=== Literary ===
- Elegies, and Other Small Poems. Ipswich: Jermyn & Forster, London: Longmans. 1797. OCLC 8660173.
- A Biographical Dictionary of the Celebrated Women of Every Age and Country. London: B. Crosby. 1804. OCLC 35029141.
- Poems. London: Hatchard. 1808. OCLC 13288477.
- Lay of Marie. London: Rowland Hunter. 1816. OCLC 11408420.
- Vignettes: in verse. London: Rowland Hunter. 1818. OCLC 22692584.
- Mary Matilda Betham (1821). The Case of Matilda Betham. London: Moses Press.
- Caroline, Queen consort of George IV King of Great Britain; Caroline, Queen consort of George IV King of Great Britain. London: Moses. 1821. OCLC 34593476.
- Remarks on the coronation, as it respects the Queen: and on recent cases called suicides. London. 1821. OCLC 56804317. - sometimes attributed to Matilda Betham
- Sonnets and Verses, To Relations and their Connexions. 1835–1837.
- Dramatic Sketch. 1836.

=== Paintings ===
She exhibited the following paintings at the Royal Academy of Arts between 1804 and 1816:

- Miss Armstrong, by 1808
- F. F. Baker, Esq., by 1805
- Harriot Beauclerk, Duchess of St Albans, by 1804
- Miss B. Betham, by 1811
- Miss E Betham, by 1806
- Mrs. J. Betham, by 1816
- Miss M. Betham, by 1805
- Mr. R. G. Betham, by 1810
- Mrs. R. G. Betham, by 1816
- Rev. William Betham, by 1810
- Rev. William Betham, by 1812
- Mr. Boughton, by 1806
- Sir C. R. Boughton , by 1806
- Miss R. Boughton, by 1807
- Miss Rouse Boughton, by 1805
- Miss Chesshyre, by 1806
- Mr. Cromie, by 1805
- Miss A. Dove, by 1816
- Miss Duncan, by 1810
- George Dyer, poet, by 1807
- Countess of Dysart, by 1804
- Rt. Hon. Lady Fauconberg, by 1806
- Mr. Finucane, by 1805
- Gaiety, miniature, by 1808
- Rt. Hon. Lady E. Gamon, by 1807
- Mrs. Colonel Gardner, by 1816
- Miss M. Graham, by 1807
- Mr. Manners, by 1804
- Miss Manners, by 1804
- Portrait of a lady, by 1807
- Portrait of a lady, by 1808
- Portrait of Mr. de Venville, Mr. Southey the poet, and Messrs. C. and G. Betham, by 1808
- Mrs. Pymar, by 1812
- Mr. Saxon, by 1807
- Self portrait, by 1810
- Rev. P. Stockdale, by 1811
- Mrs. C. Thompson, by 1807
- Master F. Thompson, by 1807
- Lady Wilson, by 1806

=== The Dinner Party ===
In 1804, the male sculptor Kresilas was mistakenly identified as a woman named Cresilla by Betham, who thought "she" had been placed third behind Polykleitos and Phidias in a competition to sculpt seven Amazons for the Temple of Artemis at Ephesus. So Kresilas was mistakenly included in artist Judy Chicago's symbolic history of women in Western civilization, The Dinner Party.

== See also ==
- Isabella Beetham, her sister-in-law, a silhouette artist
- Jane Beetham Read, her cousin, a miniature and silhouette portrait painter
- William Betham (1779–1853), her brother, an English herald and antiquarian
