= Richard Crosse (painter) =

English painter (1742–1810)

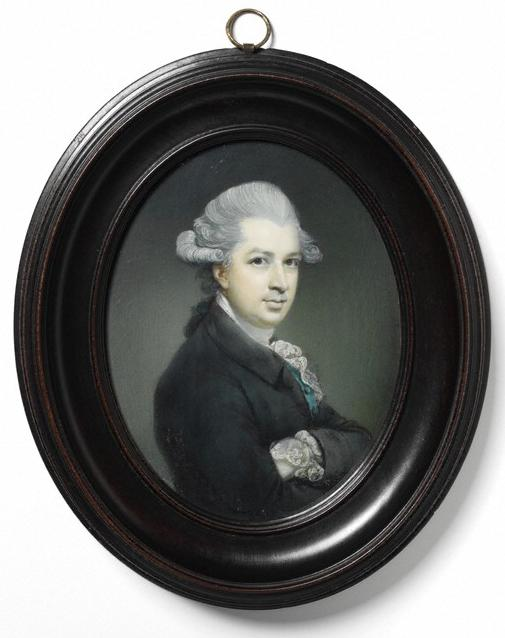
- Self-portrait in miniature, c. 1780. Held by Victoria and Albert Museum
- Born: 24 April 1742; Knowle, Devon, England
- Died: May 1810 (aged 68); Knowle, Devon, England
- Known for: Painting

Richard Crosse (24 April 1742 – May 1810) was an English painter of portrait miniatures. He was a contemporary of John Smart, George Engleheart, Richard Cosway and William Wood.

== Early and personal life ==
Crosse was born on 24 April 1742 in Knowle, in the parish of Cullompton, Devon, to John and Mary Crosse. His father was a lawyer, and his family were members of the landed gentry. Crosse was, like one of his sisters, completely deaf and never able to speak. He had at least six siblings.

Crosse fell in love with his cousin, Sarah Cobley, but she was already engaged to Benjamin Haydon - and it appears that he was deeply affected by his disappointment, leaving Crosse heartbroken. He is said to have felt the pain of this unrequited love for the rest of his life, and never married. Crosse lived and worked in Henrietta Street, Covent Garden, London, from 1760. His brother kept house and acted as liaison between Crosse and his clients. Crosse retired to Wells in the late 1790s, and lived with Miss Cobley's brother. Crosse met Sarah Cobley again in 1807, when she decided to visit her brother after she learned her illness was fatal. She arrived unexpectedly, and her brother was not able to get Crosse out of the house beforehand. On seeing Sarah after so many years, Crosse rushed up to her and embraced her with strong emotion. She died the next day. Crosse died in May 1810, aged 68, at his old family home in Knowle.

== Professional career ==
Crosse began painting as a hobby, as was the fashion amongst the gentry. At the age of 16 he won a premium at the newly created 'Society for the Encouragement of Arts, Manufactures and Commerce' (the Society of Arts) in London. He then moved to London and, like Richard Cosway and John Smart, he studied at the new drawing school of William Shipley, the founder of the Society of Arts. He also studied at the Duke of Richmond's Gallery.

Crosse exhibited his work at the new London societies: at the Society of Artists 1760–1796, the Free Society 1761–1766, and the Royal Academy 1770–1796. He lived and worked in Henrietta Street, in Covent Garden, London, from 1760. His brother acted as intermediary between Crosse and his clients. Basil Long in his book "British Miniaturists" (1929) regarded Crosse as a very accurate draughtsman who painted without hesitation or retouching and who will one day receive recognition for his sound, if modest, work.

Despite not being able to hear or speak, Crosse was very successful, and was highly regarded by his distinguished clientele. His clients included the Prince of Wales, and the Dukes of Cumberland and Gloucester. He painted his works mainly with watercolour on ivory; he also executed a few miniatures in enamel, a difficult and not always successful medium; as well as painting portraits in oil. Many of his portrait miniatures are small in size, being less than 2 inches in height. The miniaturists of the period 1760–1780 were still learning to paint on ivory, as it has a greasy surface which is difficult to paint with watercolour. Rather than attempt to paint on large surfaces, many portrait miniaturists from this period used ivories of only 1 1/2 to 2 inches in height. Ivory was used for miniatures, as it gives a beautiful luminosity to the skin tones of the sitter's face. During the 1780s and 1790s Crosse did use some large sized ivories of 3.5 inches or more in height. His fees started at around 8 guineas for small works, and rose up to 30 guineas for his largest portraits.

Crosse's work is refined, and in the best examples the sitters really look as if they could walk right out of the frame, they are so lifelike. Crosse's miniatures often seem to be dominated by a shade of greenish-blue, maybe influenced by the early work of Joshua Reynolds. His works tend to have a greenish-blue hue to them, and his red pigments have faded a little over the years. He seldom signed his work. The fashion of the time was for women to increasingly wear their hair high on their head, and often it was powdered. It is interesting to see how Crosse manages to fit a head and shoulders portrait of a lady with stacked hair on to such a small piece of ivory. Men generally wore their hair ‘en queue’, pulled back into a ponytail tied with a black ribbon; often they wore powdered wigs over their hair, or powdered their hair directly.

Crosse, as a member of the landed gentry, possessed a private income; he also earned quite a considerable sum from his portraiture. He invested his money wisely in property and stocks and shares, and received a good income from these investments in his later years. He retired from commercial painting in the late 1790s.

== Examples of Crosse's work ==
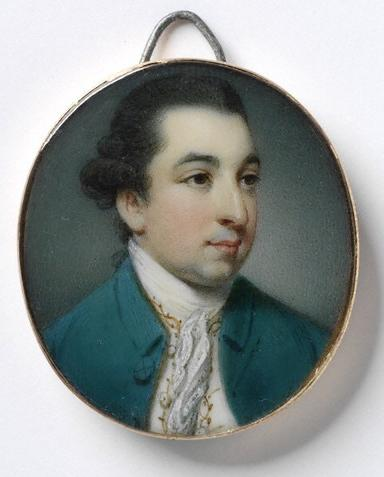
Richard Crosse, Portrait of Unknown Man, c1770, Victoria & Albert Museum

Richard Crosse, Portrait of Unknown Woman, c1780, Victoria & Albert Museum
