= Joan Rees =

Joan Rees (1923 – 2 December 2014) was a British scholar specialising in Elizabethan, Jacobean and 19th century English literature. A professor emerita at the University of Birmingham, she won the British Academy's Rose Mary Crawshay Prize in 1979. She was a Fellow of the Royal Society of Literature.

== Life ==
Joan Rees worked in the Civil Service during the Second World War. She obtained a master's degree in English from the University of London (1950) and a doctorate from the University of Birmingham in 1970.

She married David G. Rees (1924–1983), a scholar of Italian studies. They had two sons.

Rees was made Reader at the University of Birmingham in 1974, and Professor in 1980. She was elected as a Fellow of the Royal Society of Literature in 1982. After her retirement, she lived near Presteigne, in Wales.

In 1964, Rees published her critical biography of the poet and playwright Samuel Daniel (1562–1619), which has subsequently become the standard study. Her biography of Jane Austen, Jane Austen: Woman and Writer (1976), was based on Austen's letters and avoided the critical controversies surrounding the author. In Rees' view, Austen was influenced by the political and social events of the day, was steeped in the literary tradition, and was driven by a strong (if unstated) Christian morality.

Rees won the Rose Mary Crawshay Prize in 1979 for her Shakespeare and the Story. The work presented a highly original, if controversial, case that Shakespeare's creative process was not of careful intellectual construction, but rather that his imagination evolved in response to the storyline as he wrote. Its presentation of Shakespeare's creativity in opposition to modern models of theme and scheme was applauded.

Rees' criticism of contemporary scholarship on Philip Sidney came out in 1991. In Sir Philip Sidney and Arcadia, she demonstrated his rich narrative and humanist views, and took issue with his portrayal as a strict Calvinist by other scholars. Her 1998 biography of Amelia Edwards, the first on the Egyptologist, was called lively and scholarly, and lauded for its exciting coverage of Edwards' story. In 2006, she was responsible for bringing back Matilda Betham-Edwards to public notice with the publication of her biography.

Rees died in 2014, age 91.

== Selected works ==
- Samuel Daniel: A Critical and Biographical Study. Liverpool University. 1964.
- Jane Austen: Woman and Writer. St. Martin's Press. 1976.
- Shakespeare and the Story: Aspects of Creation. Athlone. 1978.
- The Poetry of Dante Gabriel Rossetti: Modes of Self Expression. Cambridge University. 1981.
- Sir Philip Sidney and Arcadia. Fairleigh Dickinson University. 1991.
- Writings on the Nile: Harriet Martineau, Florence Nightingale and Amelia Edwards. Rubicon. 1995.
- Amelia Edwards, Traveller, Novelist and Egyptologist. Rubicon. 1998.
- Matilda Betham-Edwards, Novelist, Travel Writer and Francophile. Hastings. 2006.
