= Matilda Betham-Edwards =

English writer, poet and children's writer (1836–1919)

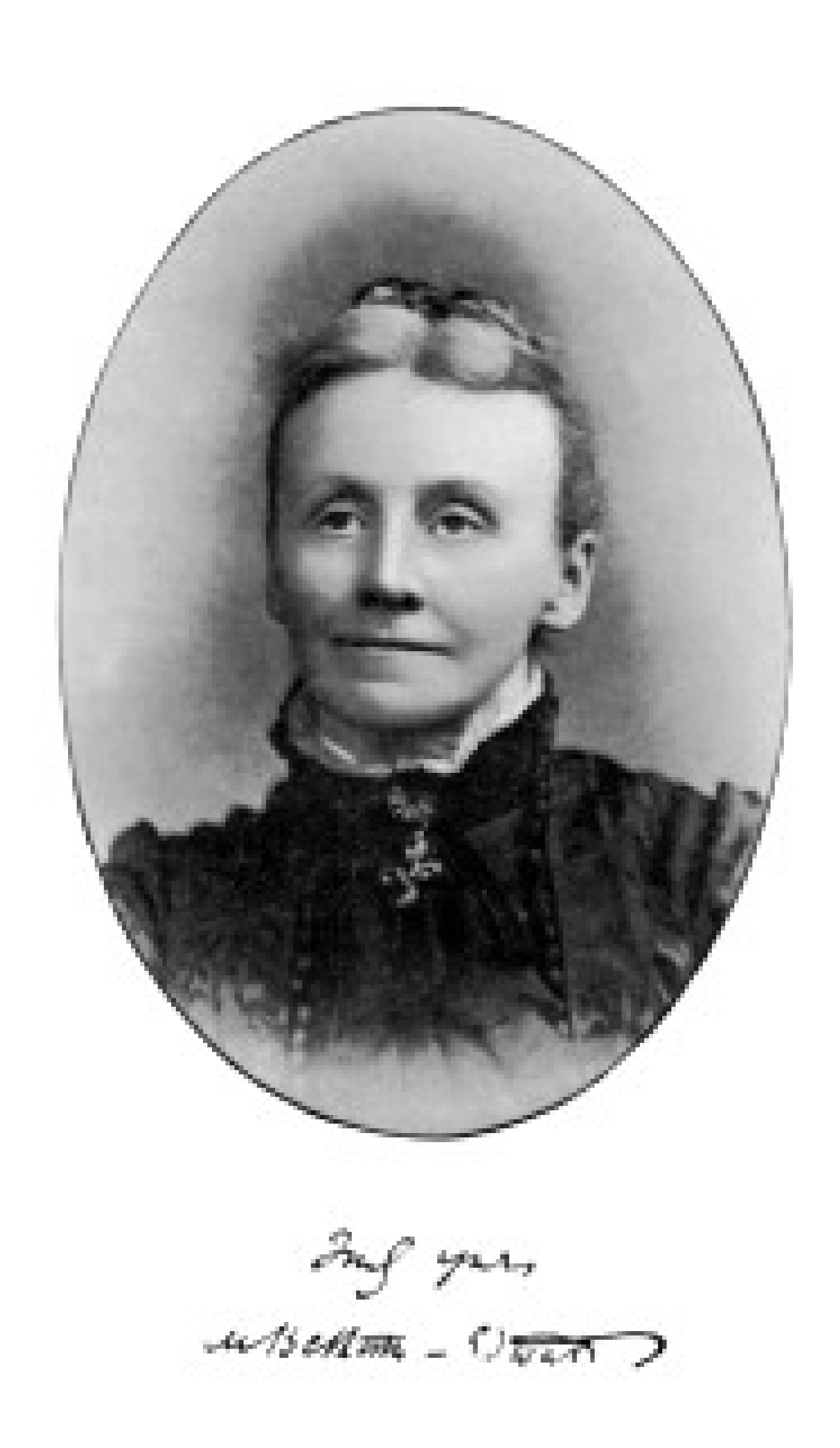
- Matilda Betham-Edwards c. 1893
- Born: March 4, 1836; Westerfield, Ipswich
- Died: January 4, 1919 (Aged 82); Hastings, Sussex
- Known for: Novels, travel writing, Francophilia

Matilda Betham-Edwards (4 March 1836, in Westerfield, Ipswich – 4 January 1919, in Hastings) was an English novelist, travel writer and Francophile, and a prolific poet, who corresponded with several well-known English male poets of the day. In addition, she wrote a number of children's books.

== Biography ==
Betham-Edwards was the fourth daughter of a farmer, Edward Edwards (c. 1808–1864) and his wife Barbara (1806–1848), daughter of William Betham (1749–1839), an antiquary and cleric. She was educated in Ipswich and as a governess-pupil at a school in London.

Her first novel, The White House by the Sea (1857), was an immediate success, reprinted several times, pirated in the United States, and in print for forty years. Matilda studied French and German abroad and then settled with her sister in Suffolk to manage the farm which had belonged to her father. Not content, however, with purely rural occupations, she contributed from time to time to Household Words, having the advantage at this time of the friendship of Charles Dickens and an early association with Charles and Mary Lamb, friends of her mother.

On her sister's death, she moved to London and wrote a number of novels of French life based on her frequent visits to France and her intimate knowledge of provincial French homes, as well as children's books, and non-fiction books about France. She was published by George and Richard Bentley. She stayed in Algeria with the feminist educationalist Barbara Bodichon and visited France and Spain with her.

Of Huguenot descent, she considered France her second native land and made it her mission to bring about better understanding and sympathy between the two countries which shared her allegiance. In this way, she did much to promote a better understanding between English and French people. The French government made her an Officier de l'Instruction Publique de France in recognition of her untiring efforts towards the establishment of a genuine and lasting entente cordiale. She was awarded a medal at the Franco-British Exhibition (1908).

Betham-Edwards is often cited in anthologies of lesbian poetry. She died in Hastings, Sussex in 1919. Professor Joan Rees has written the only biography of Matilda Betham-Edwards, in 2006 (see below).

== Works ==
- The White House by the Sea, 1857
- Holidays Among the Mountains (or Scenes and Stories of Wales), 1860
- Little Bird Red and Little Bird Blue (verse drama), 1861
- John and I, 1862
- Doctor Jacob, 1864
- Lisabee's Love Story 1865
- A Winter with the Swallows, 1867
- Through Spain to the Sahara, 1868
- Kitty, 1869
- The Sylvestres, 1871
- Felicia, 1875
- Bridget, 1877
- Brother Gabriel, 1878
- Six Life Stories of Famous Women, 1880
- Forestalled, 1880
- Pearla, 1883
- Half-Way, 1886
- Next of Kin Wanted, 1887
- The Parting of the Ways, 1888
- For One and the World, 1889
- A Romance of the Wire, 1891
- Edition of Arthur Young’s Travels in France, 1892
- Romance of a French Parsonage, 1892
- France of To-Day, 1892
- The Curb of Honour, 1893
- A Romance of Dijon, 1894
- The Golden Bee and other Recitations, 1895
- Autobiography of Arthur Young, 1898
- The Lord of the Harvest, 1899
- Anglo-French Reminiscences, 1900
- A Suffolk Courtship, 1900
- Mock Beggars’ Hall, 1902
- Barham Brocklebank, 1903
- A Humble Lover, 1903
- Home Life in France, 1905
- Martha Rose, 1906
- Poems, 1907
- A Close Ring, 1907
- Literary Rambles in France, 1907
- Friendly Faces of Three Nationalities, 1911
- In French Africa, 1912
- From an Islington Window, 1914
- Hearts of Alsace, 1916
- Twentieth Century France, 1917
- French Fireside Poetry, 1919
- Mid-Victorian Memories, 1919

== See also ==
- Mary Matilda Betham
- List of English novelists
- English literature
