= George Engleheart =

English painter (1750–1829)

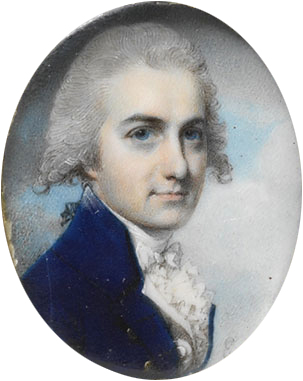
Portrait of John Dyer Collier, circa 1785, by George Engleheart; watercolour on ivory; V&A Museum no. P.76-1910 Victoria and Albert Museum, London

George Engleheart (1750–1829) was an English painter of portrait miniatures, and a contemporary of Richard Cosway, John Smart, William Wood, and Richard Crosse.

== Family and home ==
Engleheart is generally thought to have been born in Kew, Surrey, on 26 October 1750. (Note: The Encyclopædia Britannica Eleventh Edition and Dictionary of National Biography, however, give a birth date in 1752.) His father was Francis Englehart (died 1773), a German plaster modeller who emigrated to England as a child; his mother was Anne Dawney. He had seven brothers. The family name was changed to Engleheart after his father died.

He married his first wife, Elizabeth Brown, in 1776; and the couple set up house in Prince's Street, Hanover Square, London. Elizabeth died in April 1779, aged only 26. Engleheart moved to 4 Hertford Street in Mayfair, London. He married his second wife, Ursula Sarah Browne in 1785; and the couple had four children: George, Nathaniel, Harry and Emma.

In 1813, Engleheart retired full-time to his country house in Bedfont, near Hounslow in Middlesex. He had built the house on land he purchased in 1783, and the interiors are said to have been decorated in the fashionable neo-classical style of Robert Adam. His second wife, Ursula, died in 1817, and Engleheart soon after gave up the house and went to live with his son Nathaniel in Blackheath, then a village to the southeast of London.

Engleheart died in Blackheath on 21 March 1829, and was buried at St. Anne's Church, Kew.

His nephew, John Cox Dillman Engleheart, was also an accomplished portrait miniaturist, painting during the Regency era.

== Professional career ==
Engleheart entered the newly formed Royal Academy Schools on 3 November 1769. He was a pupil of George Barret, R.A., and of Sir Joshua Reynolds. Engleheart started on his own account in 1773, and worked mainly in London for the whole of his career. He regularly exhibited at the Royal Academy from 1773 to 1822. He kept a detailed fee book from 1775 to 1813, which included detailed sketches of his miniatures. The book remains in the possession of his family to this day. Engleheart was a prolific artist: during the period of 39 years covered by the fee book, no less than 4,853 miniatures are recorded as having been executed by him.

His fees ranged from 3 guineas in 1775, up to 25 guineas by 1811. His professional income for many years exceeded £1,200 per annum.

Engleheart mainly painted watercolour on ivory, and his work can be categorised into three distinct periods.

His initial paintings were small in size. It was common for artists of the period circa 1775 to paint on small ivories of approximately 1½ to 2 inches in height. Miniaturists at this time were still learning to exploit the full potential of ivory, and were struggling to find ways of adhering the watercolour to its greasy surface. Hence, they found it difficult to paint large areas of ivory, and tended to keep the miniatures small. It was still fashionable for ladies to wear portrait miniatures on bracelets around their wrists, and small miniatures helped facilitate this. Engleheart's portraits of this era are sometimes signed 'G.E.' The flesh tones are coloured by reddish tints over a pale ground, with the facial features accentuated using a bluish-grey tone.

During the period circa 1780–1795, Engleheart developed his very distinctive style, with his draughtsmanship and use of colour becoming consistent and high quality. He still sometimes paints small sized miniatures, but he more frequently paints on ivories of around 2½ inches in height. His works are easily recognisable: he often portrays his sitters with deep eyes under strong eyebrows, together with a slightly lengthened nose, and the flesh colour of the face is painted using a brownish yellow tone. The corners of the mouth are drawn with diagonal grey strokes. Engleheart imbues his sitters with a sense of gentleness, elegance and serenity; even his military officers look more at home in the drawing room than the battlefield. He often used opaque white to pick out the details of the pale coloured dresses worn by his female subjects, and their hair is often worn high and/or powdered, as was the fashion of the time. The men wear their hair powdered 'en queue', i.e. powdered wigs worn over long hair pulled back into a ponytail which was tied with a black ribbon. Engleheart did not always sign his work during this period, but towards the end of this phase he began signing with a cursive 'E' placed in the bottom corner of the obverse, and he continued with this style of signature for quite a number of years. In addition, he also started to sign and date his portraits in full on their reverse.

The third and final period of Engleheart's career is circa 1795–1813. His painting style does not really change from that developed in the preceding years, but his ivories are now large, measuring around 3 to 3½ inches in height. The clothes of his sitters are much simpler, following the simple style which came into fashion in France from 1789 onwards, as a result of the Revolution. Powdered hair was further helped out of fashion in Britain in 1795, when the British government imposed a tax of 1 guinea per annum on those individuals wishing to wear hair powder or powdered wigs; the tax being introduced to part finance the war with France (it was during the French Revolutionary Wars). The fashions of this era are referred to as the Regency style. Men tended to dress like country squires: often wearing a plain navy blue or brown coat, with a white high-collared shirt and white cravat; their hair was brushed forward (imitating the style worn by the ancient Romans) and sometimes markedly pushed up vertically off the forehead. Women dressed in the Grecian style, wearing empire line dresses in white muslin or coloured silk or satin; their hair is worn up, with longer curls falling either side of the face as the period progressed. During this time, Engleheart tutored two of his relatives, John Cox Dillman Engleheart and Thomas Richmond, in how to paint miniatures. As this final phase of his career progressed, Engleheart reverted to signing his work with a 'G.E.', in either cursive form or block capitals.

Engleheart painted George III twenty-five times, and had a very extensive circle of patrons, comprising nearly all the important persons connected with the court. He made careful copies in miniature of many of the famous paintings executed by Sir Joshua Reynolds, and in some cases these constitute the only information we possess respecting portraits by Sir Joshua that are now missing. His fee-book, colours, appliances and a large collection of his miniatures still remain in the possession of his descendants.

== Circle of friends ==
His friends included such notables as George Romney the artist; William Blake the poet, artist and visionary; Jeremiah Meyer, a fellow portrait miniaturist; and William Hayley the poet.

== Examples of Engleheart's work ==
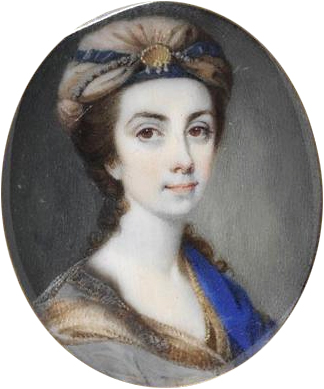
George Engleheart - Portrait of Unknown Woman – circa 1775 – Victoria & Albert Museum

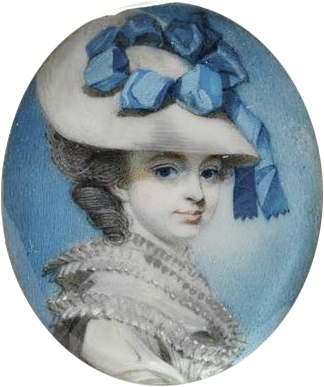
George Engleheart - Portrait of Unknown Woman – circa 1780 – Frame with bracelet fitting - Victoria & Albert Museum

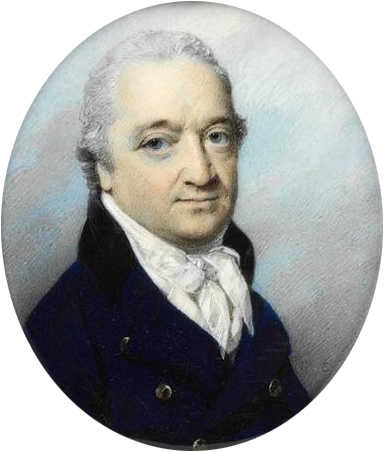
George Engleheart - Portrait of Unknown Man – circa 1800 – Signed with cursive 'E' on obverse - Victoria & Albert Museum

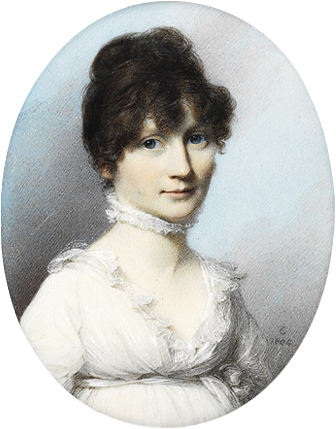
George Engleheart - Portrait of Unknown Woman - Signed with cursive 'E' and dated 1804 on obverse - Victoria & Albert Museum

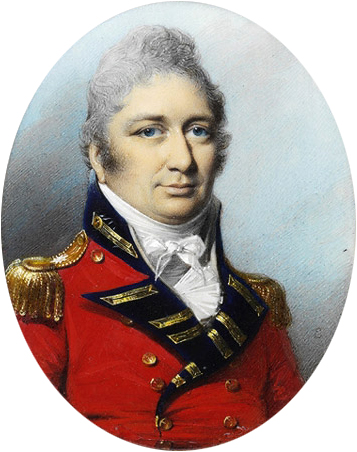
George Engleheart - Portrait of Colonel Cuppage - Dated 1806 – Signed with cursive 'E' on obverse - Victoria & Albert Museum
