= John Bentham =

English footballer

Personal information
- Full name: John James Bentham
- Date of birth: 3 March 1963 (age 63)
- Place of birth: South Elmsall, West Riding of Yorkshire, England
- Height: 5 ft 7 in (1.70 m)
- Position: Winger

Youth career
- –1979: Bolton Wanderers
- 1979–1981: York City

Senior career*
Years	Team	Apps	(Gls)
1981–1983	York City	23	(0)
Total		23	(0)
- * Club domestic league appearances and goals

John James Bentham (born 3 March 1963) is an English former professional footballer who played as a winger in the Football League for York City and was on the books of Bolton Wanderers as an associate schoolboy.
