= Cecilia Betham =

Irish archer (1843–1913)

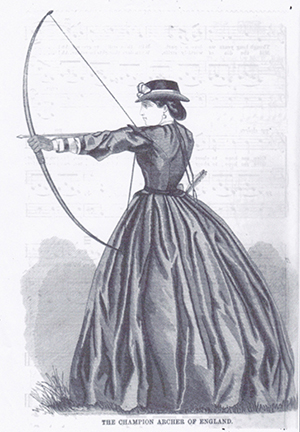
- Betham, "the champion archer of England" from Arthur’s Illustrated Home Magazine, October 1865
- Born: Cecilia Maria Eleanor Betham; January 1843; Tunbridge Wells, Kent, England
- Died: 18 April 1913 (aged 70); Market Drayton, England

Cecilia Betham (January 1843 – 18 April 1913) was an Irish archer.

== Early life and family ==
Cecilia Betham was born in Tunbridge Wells, Kent in January 1843. She was the only daughter and second child of archivist, Molyneux Cecil John Betham (1813–1880), and Elizabeth Betham (née Ford). Her maternal grandparents were Sir Richard Ford, chief magistrate (1800–1806) and an amateur painter, Marianne (née Booth). Her uncle was writer Richard Ford. The family lived in London when Betham was a young child, living in 123 Park Street, Grosvenor Square by 1846, and Clarges Street by 1851, where she was educated at home. In 1829, Molyneux Betham was appointed Cork herald of arms, and in 1834 the deputy Ulster king of arms. The family returned to Ireland following the death of Betham's paternal grandfather, William Betham, on 26 October 1853.

Betham married her first cousin William Sheffield Betham in Devon on 27 August 1874. William was Local Government Board official and a member of the County of Dublin Archers, and eldest son of the Dublin herald, Sheffield Philip Fiennes Betham. Betham was widowed after William's death on 12 April 1876. They had one child, Gertrude Cecilia Betham and lived at 1 Tobernea Terrace, Seapoint, Blackrock. Betham remarried widower, John Edmond Corbett, on 23 June 1891. Along with Gertrude and Corbett's daughter, Mildred, the couple lived at "Everest", Lillington Road, Lillington. After the death of Corbett on 8 December 1904, Betham moved to 'The Beeches', 69 Stafford Street, Market Drayton, where she died on 18 April 1913.

== Archery career ==
They moved into William Betham's house at Rockford, Blackrock, Dublin, and it was here that Betham developed an interest in archery. Along with her father and other relatives living in the neighbourhood, she became a member of The County of Dublin Archers, one of Ireland's leading archery clubs at the time. Her first national win was coming runner-up at the August 1863 Irish women's championship at the Carlisle cricket and archery ground in Bray, the second time this competition had been held. She came second to Mrs Horniblow, a dominant player in English archery, with Betham equalling Horniblow's hits at 50 yard distance. This contest was the beginning of a rivalry between the two that lasted several years.

Betham defeated Horniblow during the Leamington and Midland archery competition on 15 to 16 June 1864, and at the Crystal Palace contest 30 June to 1 July the same year. The highest point of her career was in 1864 when she won the British championship at the Grand National archery competition, held at Alexandra Park, London on 6 to 8 July. She won her first Irish national championship the same year the competition held at the Leinster Cricket Club's grounds, in Portobello, Dublin from 27 to 28 July. She won the British national championships in July 1865 in Clifton, Bristol, in July 1866 at Crown Point, near Norwich, and in July 1868 at Hereford racecourse. She was runner up at this competition in July 1867 at Preston, near Brighton, and came fourth in July 1869 at Aston Park, near Birmingham.

In August 1865 at the Stirlingshire Cricket Club, Livilands, Stirling, she won the Scottish national title. In June 1865 and August 1867, she won the Irish national championships at the Exhibition Palace in Dublin. She came runner-up to Mrs Horniblow in August 1866 at the Irish competition. She won the Leinster championships in September 1866 and August 1867 at Exhibition Palace, two Ulster championships in August 1866 at Ulsterville, Belfast and in August 1867 at Armagh, and two Munster championships in September 1867 in Limerick, and in September 1868 at Mallow Castle.
