= Isabella Beetham =

British artist

- Born: Isabella Robinson; 1750 to 1754
- Died: August 1825; Somers Town, London, England
- Education: John Smart
- Known for: Silhouette artist
- Spouse: Edward Beetham

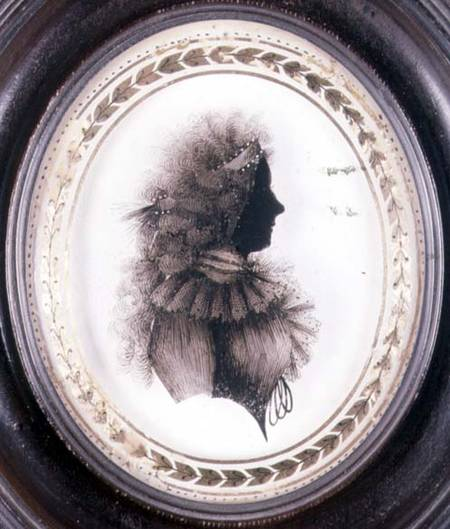
Silhouette of a lady, oil painted on convex glass, late 18th century, private collection

Isabella Beetham was an 18th-century British silhouette artist. She began her career by cutting the silhouette images. After studying painting with successful miniature portraitist John Smart, Beetham painted silhouettes to be framed or miniatures were made for jewelry. From 1785 to 1809, she had a business on 27 Fleet Street in London, where she produced silhouettes of men and women. She is considered one of the great 18th century silhouette artists, along with John Miers.

== Personal life ==
Isabella Robinson was reported to have been born between 1750 and 1754. (Note: Isabella is also said to have been born in 1744.) The ODNB thinks it likely that she was born on 11 November 1754 and baptised in Netherwitton. Her family were Roman Catholics and Jacobites. Her mother was called Elizabeth and both her father and grandfather were named John Robinson. Isabella's father was of Sedgefield, Durham and her grandfather, an architect and builder, was of Lancaster, Lancashire.

She eloped with Edward Beetham who was from a landed gentry family in Little Strickland in Cumbria. They married in County Durham on 13 June 1774 in Trimdon. At the time of their meeting he used his original surname, Betham. Edward Betham, who was born in 1744 and he was the eldest of a brother William and their sisters. Edward and William were born at the Long House in Little Strickland. Edward was identified as an actor, which was considered a lowly profession. As a result of his decision to take up acting and marry a woman of a different faith, Edward changed his surname to Beetham to avoid embarrassing his parents. Edward worked at the Sadler's Wells Theatre in London and Haymarket Theatre. He invented a weighted roll-up curtain for the theatre to avoid curtains from catching fire in the candle foot-lighting. Since he did not have the money for a patent, he did not profit from the widely used invention. He later became a successful inventor and businessman. The Beetham's had six children. The oldest child was Jane, born about 1773, followed by William, born in 1774. After the birth of the second child, Edward reconciled with his parents. Their subsequent children were Harriet, Charles, Cecilia, and Alfred.

The family lived in Cow Lane, Clerkenwell, London and then Little Queen Street, Holborn, London. Edward and Isabella produced a puppet show in 1775 and 1780. Isabella created a frontispiece with a mezzotint portrait of Edward, with images reflecting "Laughter", "Gravity", and "Misery".

The Beethams established their residence and businesses at 26 and 27 Fleet Street in 1785. In the 18th century the area included publishers, engravers, bookstores, and quaint gabled houses. At Fleet Street, the Beetham's entertained artist John Opie, writer William Godwin, publisher John Murray, Lidford Bellamy, poet George Dyer, Dr. Priestley, artist John Smart, and Admiral William and Elizabeth (née Betham) Bligh, who was a relative. She gave lessons to Amelia Alderson, who was also in her circle of friends. She made a silhouette portrait of her in 1794. Charles Lamb remarked that she was a warm, generous, and slightly bohemian woman.

The Beetham's moved into a quaint house with three gables on Chancery Lane, just off Fleet Street, to accommodate the growing family. The house was razed when the lane was widened around the turn of the century.

== Early career ==
A tale circulated in the 18th century of a young woman from Corinth who, based on the shadow cast by a lamp, drew the outline of her lover's face on the wall. This story, The Corinthian Maid, of a potter's daughter helped to generate interest in silhouette painting in that period. John Miers was known as the best silhouette painter by many critics. Auguste Edouart was a prolific and well-regarded silhouette cutter, who was born in France and worked in England before settling in the United States. Beetham was also identified as a leading silhouette artist in Britain in the 18th century, and was the first woman to make a living making silhouettes

Isabella developed a talent for making silhouette portraits, first called profiles and shades, which are a solid outline of an image. Initially, Beetham made the portraits by cutting the images on card and paper. She illustrated details, such as frills, on the silhouette with tiny slashes. Her work routinely has a bust-line finish that differentiates her work from other artists. Women had hair styles and hats typical for the time period; Men had cravats without bows.

Frames, generally oval shaped, were made of giltwood, pearwood, papier-mache, and brass. The frames were often larger than those used by her competitors. A lengthy trade label was affixed on the back of her work after 1774, that conveyed that she produced portraits of loved family members and friends to help people cope with their loss. The message on the label was so large, though, that much of the verbiage was lost when the label was cut to fit the portrait. Over her career, she had seven trade labels, her cut silhouettes per produced using her first three trade labels.

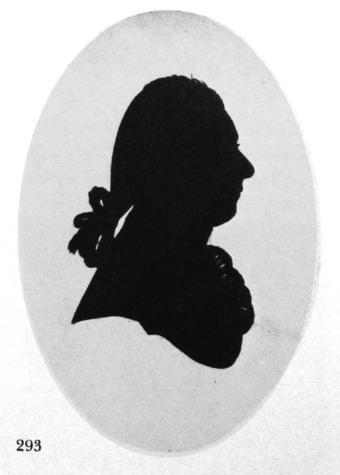
John Lloyd-Jones, 1780–1784, Victoria and Albert Museum

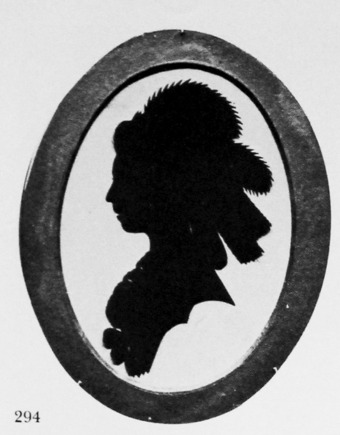
Mrs. John Lloyd-Jones, nee Bridget Lloyd, 1780–1784, Victoria and Albert Museum

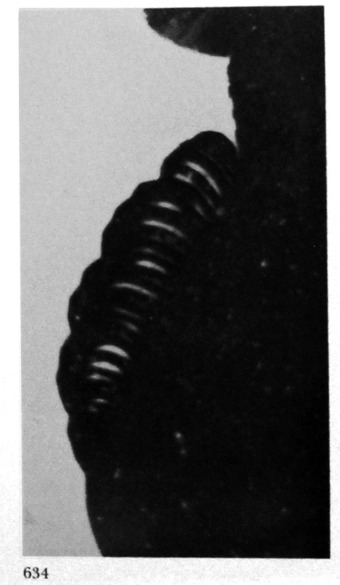
Mrs. John Lloyd-Jones, nee Bridget Lloyd, detail

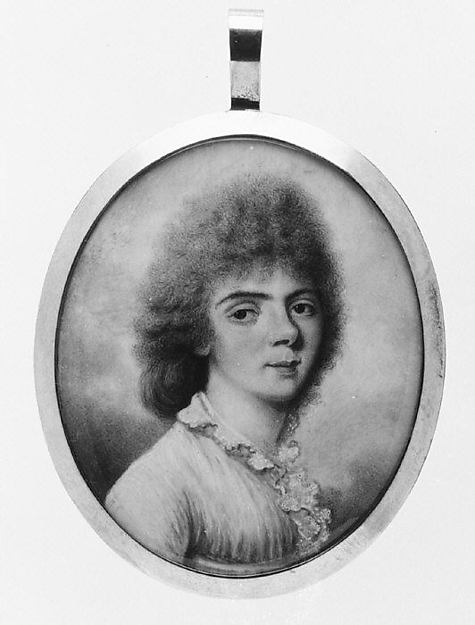
Isabella Beetham, Miss Chambers, ivory miniature portrait, after 1782, Metropolitan Museum of Art

She then studied portrait painting in London with John Smart, who was a successful miniature portrait artist. Beetham painted silhouette portraits on a white background, such as plaster, and often on glass. She made miniature portraits for jewelry. Edward learned a new way to gild glass near Venice in Murano, Italy for his wife's business in 1784 to 1785.

== Fleet Street ==
In early 1785, Edward leased 26 and 27 Fleet Street in London for the family's businesses and residence. A studio was established in 27 Fleet Street for Isabella to paint her silhouettes, and on the lower floors Edward sold washing machines using his patented wooden, rather than stone, mangles. (Note: Edward was also director of an insurance company and was a publisher.) Bust or 3/4 length profiles were painted on thick paper by Beetham and an employee named Mrs. Bull, whose style varied from Beetham. She also employed William Gardiner, who was an actor, artist, scene-painter, and engraver who put finishing touches on the portraits. Beetham was particularly adept at capturing the fashions of the day in great detail.

She painted hair in long, sweeping lines, hairs outside the main image often being shown singly, as if painted with a quill or a single-hair brush. Mrs Beetham sometimes used as many as twenty-four different strokes to show only one of the curls on the à la conseilleur and 'three ringlets' hair-styles which were coming into fashion for women by 1786. She painted the long tresses at the back with similar skill against a wash background, also used for curls near the face to give depth to the portrait. On profiles of men also, she painted hair in sweeping lines, and many examples show little strokes at the back of the head, outside the main image, which give a 'brushed-back' effect. Ribbons on her profiles of men are most easily recognizable from the slight variations in shape shown on the illustrated examples.

Likewise, men and women's clothing were painted with "consummate skill", using straight hatching and cross-hatching to paint frills and details. Beetham used different painting techniques, like dot formations and hatching, to illustrate women's dress. Gum arabic was used for shading. In some cases, she used gold for women's profiles. Work made in Beetham's shop was affixed with a trade label on the back of the work.

Into the 1790s, silhouettes were no longer painted on paper. In 1792, Beetham advertised that she created detailed likenesses—with unrivalled taste and elegance—on gold and silver decorated glass, composition, paper, and ivory. She also made miniature portraits for bracelets, lockets, and rings. Beetham was regarded as one of the best silhouette makers of her time, particularly for her ability to capture the sitter's features.

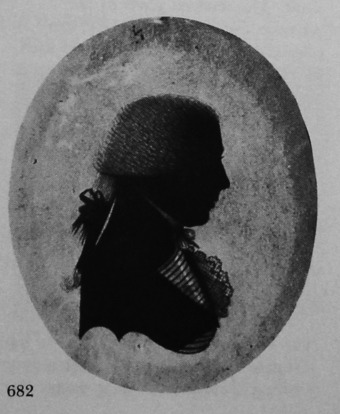
Unknown man, c. 1785–1786

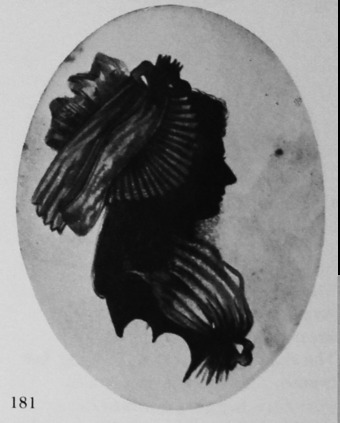
Unknown woman, c. 1791–1792

Beetham's daughter Jane, who was born about 1779, began assisting her in the work from the early 1790s until 1797, when Jane was married. Jane frequently painted on glass.

== Death ==
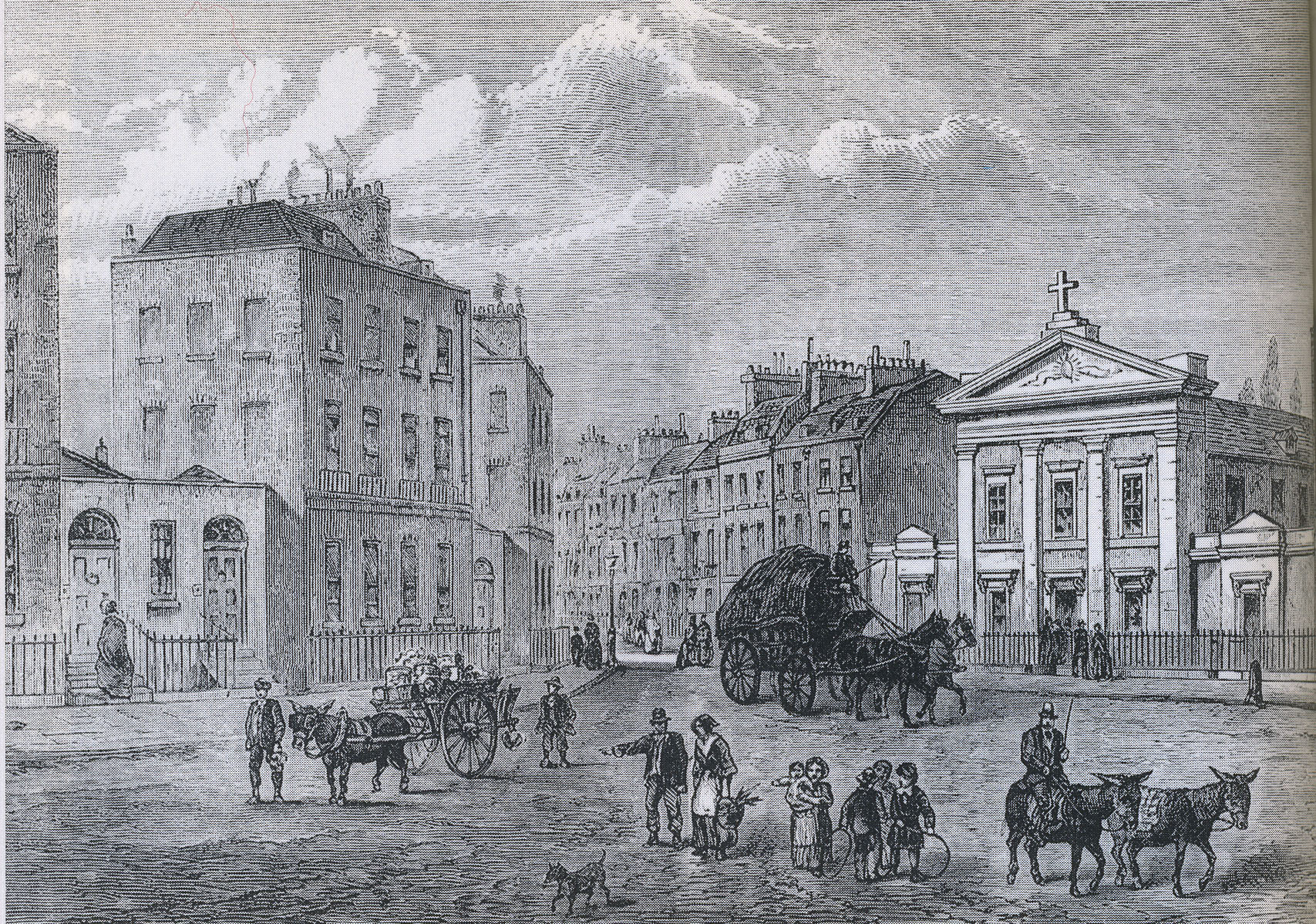
Joseph Swain, Clarendon Square, Somers Town, London, engraving. The Polygon is on left and St Aloysius Chapel on the right.

Edward died in 1809. Isabella lived her later years at 9 The Polygon, a group of houses at Clarendon Square, Somers Town, London (now between St Pancras and Euston stations). Her daughters also lived in the Somers Town, an area settled by French refugees during their homeland's revolution and was mostly inhabited by people of the Roman Catholic faith and low incomes. Isabella Beetham made out her will on 3 August 1825 and died that month, at her home by the 16th, when her will was proved. She left an estate of £200 (equivalent to £16,160 in 2025) to her daughters Cecilia Georgi and Harriet Norman. (Note: It is unknown why the other children were not mentioned in the will (e.g., if they predeceased their mother, were financially secure, etc.))

== Legacy ==
It was reported in 1991 that one of her silhouettes sold for $3,498 at a Christie's auction. This compares to a silhouette of children, pets and toys by Auguste Edouart (1788–1861) that sold for $2,100 at Skinner and an 1874 silhouette of a husband and wife enjoying tea by William Welling sold at Phillips for $4,832.

In 1995, Michael Christie had one of the finest private silhouette collections, with 120 images by noted silhouette artists, such as Beetham and Miers. The collection was started in 1893 by his mother, Madge Christie. Its highest valued item was a half-length silhouette of a lady by Beetham valued at about £3,000.

== Collections ==
- Brooklyn Museum, New York
- Metropolitan Museum of Art, New York
- Victoria and Albert Museum, London

== See also ==
- Silhouette artists
