= Joseph Bentham =

Church of England clergyman

- Born: 1593/94
- Died: 16 April 1671; Broughton, Northamptonshire, England
- Occupation(s): Church of England minister Preacher and writer
- Spouse(s): 1. 1619 Martha; 2. 1660 Elizabeth Brooks (a widow)
- Children: 8

Joseph Bentham (1593/94 – 1671) was a Church of England minister. His early sermons, many of which were written down and published, disclose a Puritan theology and thoroughgoing Calvinism, but he became increasingly associated with the Royalist cause as Civil War approached. He left little trace during the Commonwealth years. Following the Restoration of the king he was able to return to the ecclesiastical living in Northamptonshire from which he had been excluded by parliament in 1643. His final book, "A Disswasive from Error", appeared in 1669.

== Life ==
From his age stated at death it is inferred that Joseph Bentham was born in 1593 or 1594. Available sources are otherwise silent on his early years, but it is known that he graduated from Pembroke College, Cambridge with a BA degree in 1615, taking his MA degree in 1618. In the meantime he was ordained into the Church of England priesthood at Peterborough on 21 September 1617.

Bentham was appointed as parish priest of Weekley in the English county of Northamptonshire on 24 February 1618. The parish was in the gift of the local landowner, Edward Montagu, described by one source as the sponsor of a "moderate puritan brotherhood", and by another as "a bountiful patron [to Bentham]". Bentham was a sufficiently engaging preacher to attract congregation members away from neighbouring parishes to his Sunday services, but the greater emphasis for like minded Christians locally was on the regular so-called Kettering lectures delivered, frequently by Joseph Bentham, in the nearby market town.

In 1630 the newly appointed Bishop of Peterborough, William Piers, took steps to eliminate disruptive puritan preaching in his diocese. Joseph Bentham was expressly and prominently listed among the preachers allowed to continue, however, and the next year, on 24 December 1631, Bentham was translated to the larger parish of Broughton (which was also in the gift of Edward Montagu). Bentham was encouraged by fellow clergymen Robert Bolton and Nicholas Estwick to publish some of his "wise and witty" sermons, and during the 1630s two volumes appeared, entitled "The Societie of the Saints" (1630) and "The Christian Conflict" (1635).

In a sermon published in 1630 Bentham declared that he was proud to be denounced by the ungodly as a "puritan". Puritans, he asserted, were "practising Protestants; such men who daily reade the Scriptures, pray with their families, teach them the way to heaven ... [and who] ... spend the Lord's daies holily in hearing God's Word, prayer, meditation, conference, singing of Psalmes, meditation of the creatures, are merciful to the poore, diligent in their particular Callings, frame their lives according to God's will revealed in his Word". While less than enthusiastic about aspects of the religious orthodoxy increasingly propounded by government, Bentham's theology was nevertheless non-confrontational in respect of the state: he was, in the words of one source, keen "to prevent the godly from molestation by the courts".

As politics became ever more polarised those with influence found themselves under increasing pressure to nail their colours to one of the two available masts, and Bentham's patron, Edward Montagu, whose earlier parliamentary career had been marked by a preference for attending his Northamptonshire constituents' interests rather than for involvement in national debate, came out as a partisan for the king. Joseph Bentham implicitly chose the same side as his patron. During the early 1640s Bentham compiled a biography of Montagu, described by one authority as "obsequious", but which remained unpublished.

On 13 July 1643 a parliamentary committee selected Bentham for expulsion from his parish. In the words of the (evidently sympathetic) eighteenth century antiquarian, John Bridges, Bentham "was sequestered by order of the parliament committee .... for his loyalty, conformity, and exemplary life; by which vices, as the committee told him, he did more harm to God's cause than twenty other men, and should therefore fare the worse for it. His wife and five children were with himself turned out of doors, with this additional circumstance of inhumanity, that he was not permitted to take a single peck of corn out of his barn to make bread for his family; nor did his wife ever recover her fifths, though she several times petitioned the committee for them. He was succeeded by John Bazeley, who seized the corn upon the ground, though he did not preach till October, and Mr. Bentham had paid the taxes to that harvest,' Reflecting the uncompromising progress of the civil war under way, Bentham's patron, Edward Montagu, had been arrested by parliamentary forces the previous year, in August 1642, and would die while still in detention in 1644, so was in no position to help.

From Bentham's own writings it is known that from 24 December 1646 Thomas Tyringham of Lower Winchendon, a royalist gentleman who, like Bentham himself, maintained a low profile during the Commonwealth, provided Bentham with a "quiet haven ...[where]... by the people's kindness, [especially Tyringham's own, Bentham had, following a period of] ...boisterous and tempestuous storms ... comfortably and contentedly continued ...[till 1660]... in an hyred house, ...[and ]... without craving and often giving thanks, yet without being burdensome."

The king returned to London in May 1660, and on 29 September 1660 Joseph Bentham was restored to his clerical incumbency at Broughton, which is where he would spend the rest of his life. During the 1660s he published two more books, entitled "The Right of Kings by Scripture" (1661) and "A Disswasive from Error" (1669). He died on 16 April 1671 and, three days later, was buried under the chancel of his church.
