= William Betham (1779–1853) =

Betham's shield of arms

Sir William Betham (1779–1853) was an English-born Irish herald and antiquarian who held the office of Ulster King of Arms from 1820 until his death in 1853. He had previously served as the Deputy Ulster from 1807 to 1820. He was knighted in 1812 by King George III.

== Biography ==
Betham was born at Stradbroke in Suffolk on 22 May 1779, the eldest son, by his wife Mary Damant, of Rev. William Betham (1749–1839) a clergyman and antiquarian, and author of the five volume work The Baronetage of England, or the History of the English Baronets, and such Baronets of Scotland as are of English Families, with Genealogical Tables and Engravings of their Armorial Bearings, published 1801–1805.

Betham took an active part in the proceedings of the Royal Irish Academy, from the period of his admission to it as a member in 1820. He became one of its governing body, acted as secretary, and made contributions to its publications. He was elected a member of the American Antiquarian Society in 1838.

He died suddenly on 26 October 1853, at his home in Rockford, County Dublin, having spent the previous day writing letters at the Office at Arms. He is buried in Carrickbrennan Churchyard in Monkstown, Dublin.

== Works ==
Betham made genealogical notes from virtually all of the prerogative wills of Ireland from 1536 to 1800 and formed them into charts of pedigrees. He worked on these Will Pedigrees for eighteen years, from 30 November 1808 until 21 October 1826. Most of the prerogative wills of Ireland were later destroyed in the fire at the Public Records Office at Four Courts in Dublin during the Irish Civil War on 13 April 1922. Betham's work provided a valuable substitute for these lost records.

Betham's original notebooks are now in the National Archives of Ireland and the Genealogical Office in Dublin has his sketch pedigrees based on his will abstracts. Abstracts from Betham's own notebooks are now published online on www.findmypast.ie There are over 400,000 genealogical abstracts for wills up to 1800, and marriage licenses to 1810. The transcripts include all the key details from the original records, including name, age, birth year, marriage year, death year, event year/ date, spouse's name, married, occupation, residence, and documentary source.

== See also ==
- Ashfield Gales
- College of Arms
- Heraldry
- King of Arms

Family

- Isabella Beetham, his sister-in-law and noted silhouette artist
- Mary Matilda Betham, sister and noted poet and painter
- Cecilia Betham, granddaughter, award-winning archer

== Notes ==
Heraldic offices
Preceded by Rear-Admiral Sir Chichester Fortescue	Ulster King of Arms; 1820 – 1853	Succeeded by Sir John Bernard Burke
