= William Betham (1749–1839) =

English clergyman and antiquarian (1749–1839)

The Reverend William Betham (17 May 1749 – 1839) was an English clergyman and antiquarian, best known for his work on the history of the English Baronetage.

== Career ==
He was born at Little Strickland, near Morland, Westmoreland, on 17 May 1749. His father was William Betham, born in 1698. He was educated at the public school of Bampton, was ordained in 1773, apparently without graduating at a university, and became chaplain to the Earl of Ancaster. From 1784 to 1833 he was headmaster of the endowed school at Stonham Aspel in Suffolk, resigning when he was appointed to the rectory of Stoke Lacy in the Diocese of Hereford. He died six years later in 1839, aged 90.

== Works ==
- Genealogical Tables of the Sovereigns of the World, from the Earliest to the Present Period, giving Pedigrees of Royal Families, beginning with the Antediluvian Patriarchs, and concluding with the House of Cromwell. Published by subscription in 1795. It was dedicated to King George III.
- The Baronetage of England, or the History of the English Baronets, and such Baronets of Scotland as are of English Families, with Genealogical Tables and Engravings of their Armorial Bearings was published in five volumes between 1801 and 1805. The baronets are listed in the volumes by reign of monarch and by order of creation. The armorials of each baronet are illustrated in monochrome plates at the end of each volume.

- Volume I (1801), Baronets created by King James I, published in Ipswich, dedicated to James Cecil, 1st Marquess of Salisbury. From Bacon of Redgrave (1) (22 May 1611) to Haggerston (96) (15 August 1643).
- Volume II (1802), Baronets created by King Charles I published in London, dedicated to Charles Cornwallis, 1st Marquess Cornwallis.
- Volume III (1803), Baronets created by King Charles II (continued), dedicated to the Earl of Dysart. Dyke (194) of Horeham (3 March 1676) to Smith (313) of Sydling (3 May 1774)
- Volume IV (1804), Baronets created by King George III (continued), dedicated to Sir William Jerningham, Baronet; Duntze (314) (28 October 1774) to Stirling (466) of Faskine (30 November 1800)
- Volume V (1805), Supplement published in London, dedicated to Sir Hugh Inglis, Baronet.

== Marriage and children ==
In 1774, he married Mary Damont, daughter of William Damont, of Eye, Suffolk. They had fifteen children. Sir William II Betham, born in 1779, was his eldest surviving son who became an antiquarian and herald. He was Ulster King of Arms from 1820 until his death in 1853. Their daughter Mary Matilda Betham was a painter and a poet. Another daughter, Barbara, was mother of Matilda Betham-Edwards.

== See also ==
- Isabella Beetham, his daughter-in-law and noted silhouette artist
