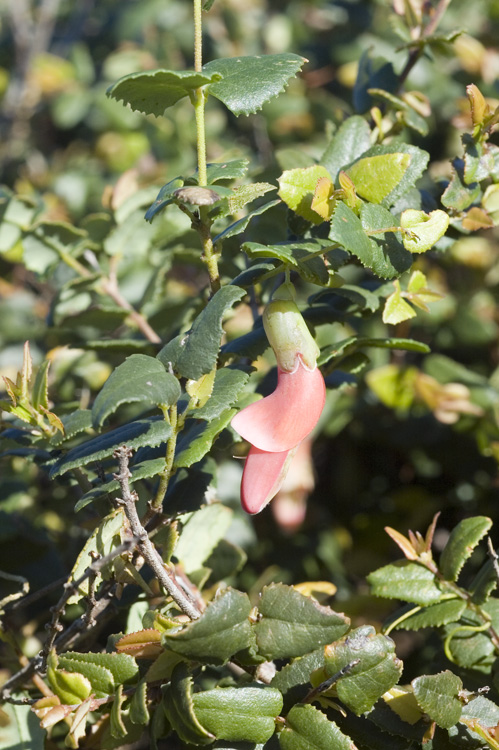
- In Cape Arid National Park

Scientific classification
- Kingdom: Plantae
- Clade: Embryophytes
- Clade: Tracheophytes
- Clade: Spermatophytes
- Clade: Angiosperms
- Clade: Eudicots
- Clade: Rosids
- Order: Fabales
- Family: Fabaceae
- Subfamily: Faboideae
- Genus: Bossiaea
- Species: B. dentata

Binomial name
- Bossiaea dentata (R.Br.) Benth.

Synonyms
- Bossiaea dentata var. angustifolia (Lindl.) Benth.; Bossiaea dentata (R.Br.) Benth. var. dentata; Bossiaea dentata var. hastata Benth.; Bossiaea dentata var. latifolia Benth.; Scottia angustifolia Lindl.; Scottia dentata R.Br.; Scottia laevis Lindl.

= Bossiaea dentata =

Species of flowering plant

Bossiaea dentata is a species of flowering plant in the family Fabaceae and is endemic to the south of Western Australia. It is an erect, sometimes prostrate shrub with variably-shaped leaves and greenish-yellow or pink to burgundy-coloured flowers.

== Description ==
Bossiaea dentata is an erect shrub that typically grows to a height of up to 3 m (9.8 ft) high, often with arching stems, but sometimes prostrate in exposed places. The leaves are arranged in opposite pairs, broadly egg-shaped to heart-shaped, or triangular to lance-shaped, sometimes linear, 8–30 mm (0.31–1.18 in) long and 3–21 mm (0.12–0.83 in) wide on a petiole 0.7–18 mm (0.028–0.709 in) long with an egg-shaped stipule 1.0–1.7 mm (0.039–0.067 in) long at the base. The edges of the leaves have irregular teeth and are sometimes rolled under. The flowers are usually arranged singly, each flower on a pedicel with two rigid, different-sized bracts up to 2.5 mm (0.098 in) long attached. The five sepals are joined at the base forming a tube 6.2–8.8 mm (0.24–0.35 in) long, the two upper lobes 1.8–2.5 mm (0.071–0.098 in) long and the three lower lobes slightly shorter. There are also bracteole 8–10 mm (0.31–0.39 in) long but that fall off in the bud stage. The standard petal is green to yellow, pale pink to dull red or burgundy and 16.2–24.1 mm (0.64–0.95 in) long, the wings 28.2–37.5 mm (1.11–1.48 in) long, the keel 27.8–36.2 mm (1.09–1.43 in) long. Flowering occurs from May to November and the fruit is an oblong pod 20–35 mm (0.79–1.38 in) long.

== Taxonomy and naming ==
This species was first formally described in 1812 by Robert Brown who gave it the name Scottia dentata in William Aiton's Hortus Kewensis. In 1864, George Bentham changed the name to Bossiaea dentata in Flora Australiensis. The specific epithet (dentata) means "toothed", referring to the edges of the leaves.

== Distribution and habitat ==
This bossiaea grows in mallee, heath and scrub, often around large granite outcrops and is found from near Albany to the Cape Arid National Park and on some offshore islands, in the Esperance Plains, Jarrah Forest and Warren biogeographic regions of southern Western Australia.

== Conservation status ==
Bossiaea dentata is classified as "not threatened" by the Government of Western Australia Department of Parks and Wildlife.
