= Pultenaea vestita =

Feather bush-pea

Conservation status
- Priority Three — Poorly Known Taxa (DEC)

Scientific classification
- Kingdom: Plantae
- Clade: Tracheophytes
- Clade: Angiosperms
- Clade: Eudicots
- Clade: Rosids
- Order: Fabales
- Family: Fabaceae
- Subfamily: Faboideae
- Genus: Pultenaea
- Species: P. vestita

Binomial name
- Pultenaea vestita R.Br.

Species of plant

Pultenaea vestita, commonly known as feather bush-pea, is a species of flowering plant in the family Fabaceae and is endemic to south-western continental Australia. It is an erect to prostrate, sometimes mat-forming shrub with elliptic to linear or lance-shaped leaves, and yellow and red, pea-like flowers.

== Description ==
Pultenaea vestita is an erect to prostrate, sometimes mat-forming shrub that typically grows to a height of 20–50 cm (7.9–19.7 in) with hairy branchlets. The leaves are elliptic to linear or lance-shaped, mostly 5–9 mm (0.20–0.35 in) long and 0.8–1.8 mm (0.031–0.071 in) wide with stipules 2.8–5.5 mm (0.11–0.22 in) long at the base. The leaves are concave to channelled on the upper surface. The flowers are 8–10 mm (0.31–0.39 in) long, sessile and usually arranged in dense heads on the ends of branches surrounded by enlarged, two-lobed stipules up to 6 mm (0.24 in) long. The sepals are 7.0–8.5 mm (0.28–0.33 in) long and joined at the base with tapering lobes and bracteoles 6–7 mm (0.24–0.28 in) long at the base. The standard petal is yellow to red and 8.5–9.2 mm (0.33–0.36 in) long, the wings yellow to red and 7.0–8.5 mm (0.28–0.33 in) long, and the keel crimson and 7.5–8.3 mm (0.30–0.33 in) long. Flowering occurs from November to January and the fruit is a slightly flattened pod.

== Taxonomy ==
Pultenaea vestita was first formally described in 1811 by Robert Brown in William Aiton's Hortus Kewensis. The specific epithet (vestita) means "clothed", referring to the overlapping stipules.

== Distribution and habitat ==
Feather bush-pea grows in forest, heathland and mallee in Western Australia around Esperance and in South Australia on the Yorke and Eyre Peninsulas and on Kangaroo Island.

== Conservation status ==
Pultenaea vestita is classified as "Priority Three" by the Government of Western Australia Department of Biodiversity, Conservation and Attractions, meaning that it is poorly known and known from only a few locations but is not under imminent threat.
