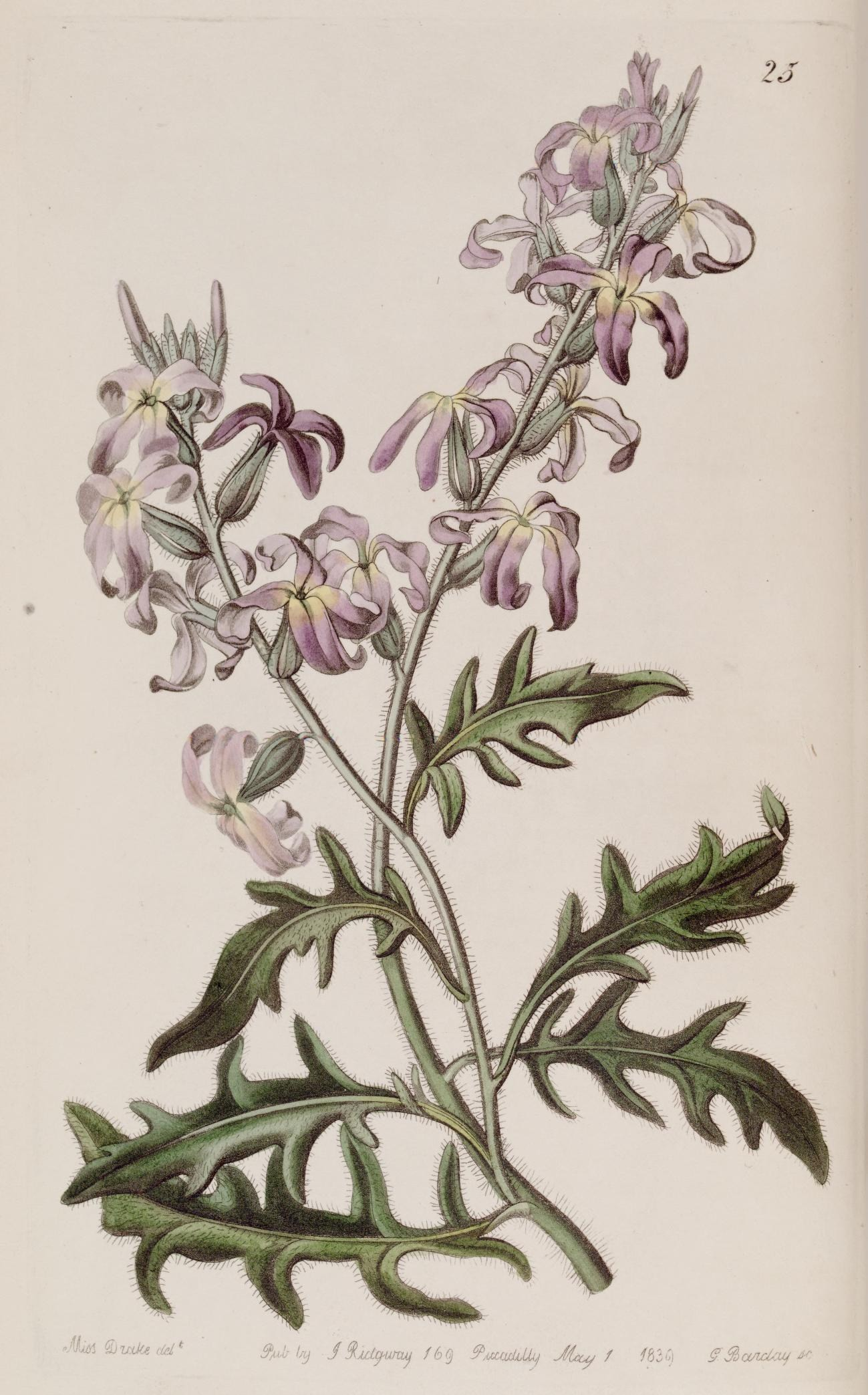
- Matthiola sp. (artist: Sarah Ann Drake)

Scientific classification
- Kingdom: Plantae
- Clade: Embryophytes
- Clade: Tracheophytes
- Clade: Angiosperms
- Clade: Eudicots
- Clade: Rosids
- Order: Brassicales
- Family: Brassicaceae
- Genus: Matthiola; W.T.Aiton

Species
- See text

Synonyms
- Acinotum Rchb.; Gakenia Heist. ex Fabr.; Mathiolaria Chevall.; Mattiola Sanguin.; Mathiola; Promicrantha Dvorák; Triceras Andrz. ex Rchb.

= Matthiola =

Genus of flowering plants in the cabbage family

Matthiola (/ˌmæθiˈoʊlə/) is a genus of flowering plant in the mustard family Brassicaceae. It is named after Italian naturalist Pietro Andrea Mattioli (1501–1577). The genus contains about 50 species of annual, biennial and perennial herbaceous plants and subshrubs. Many are cultivated for their heavily scented, colorful flowers.

The common name stock may be applied to the whole genus, more specifically to varieties and cultivars of Matthiola incana. The common names evening stock and night-scented stock are applied to varieties of Matthiola longipetala (syn. M. bicornis). The common name Virginia stock refers to a separate genus of the same family (Malcolmia maritima).

== Species ==
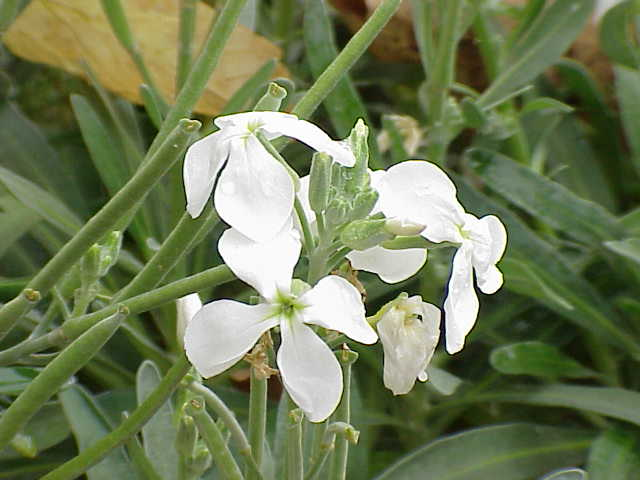
Matthiola incana

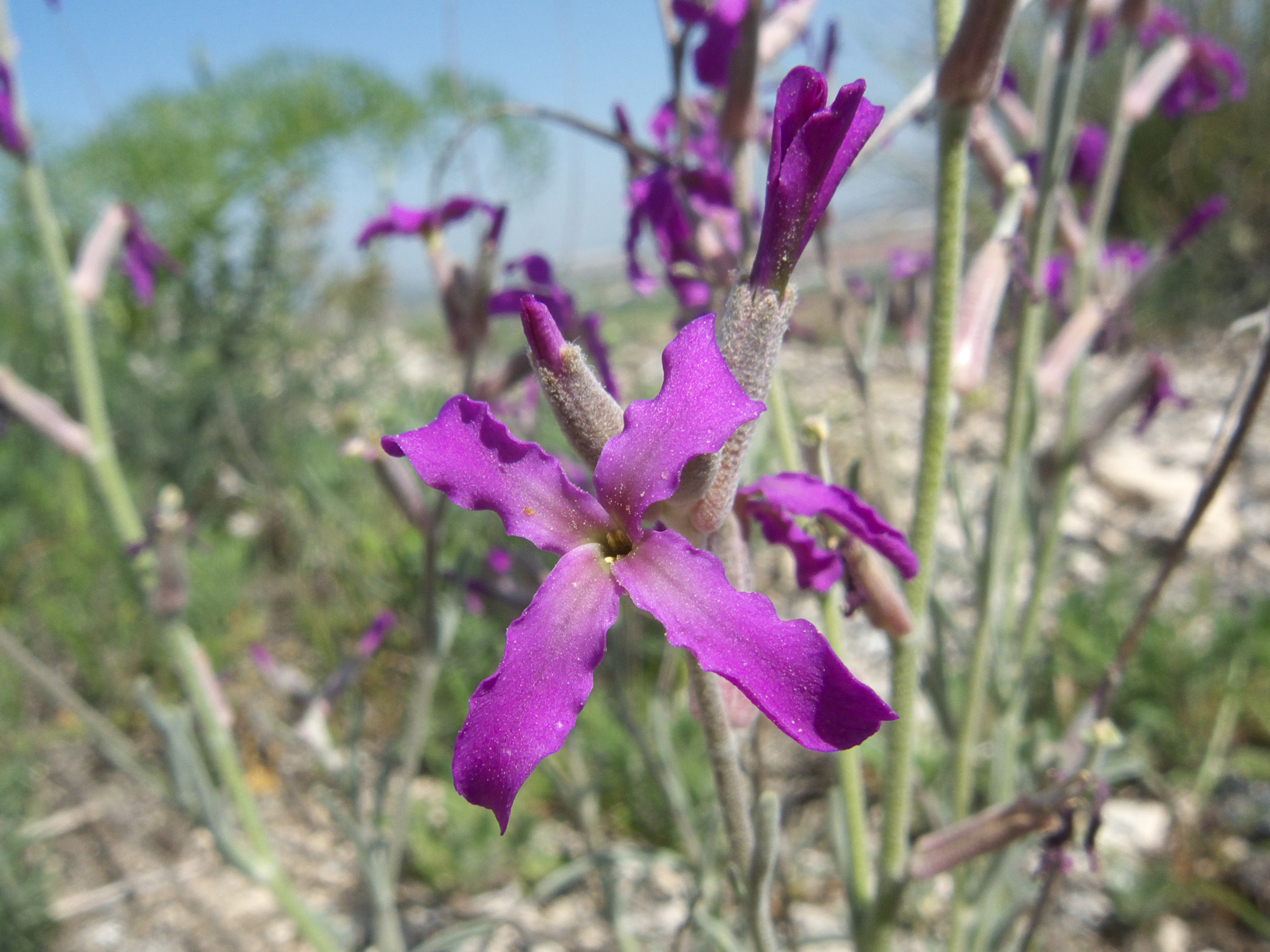
Matthiola fruticulosa ssp. fruticulosa

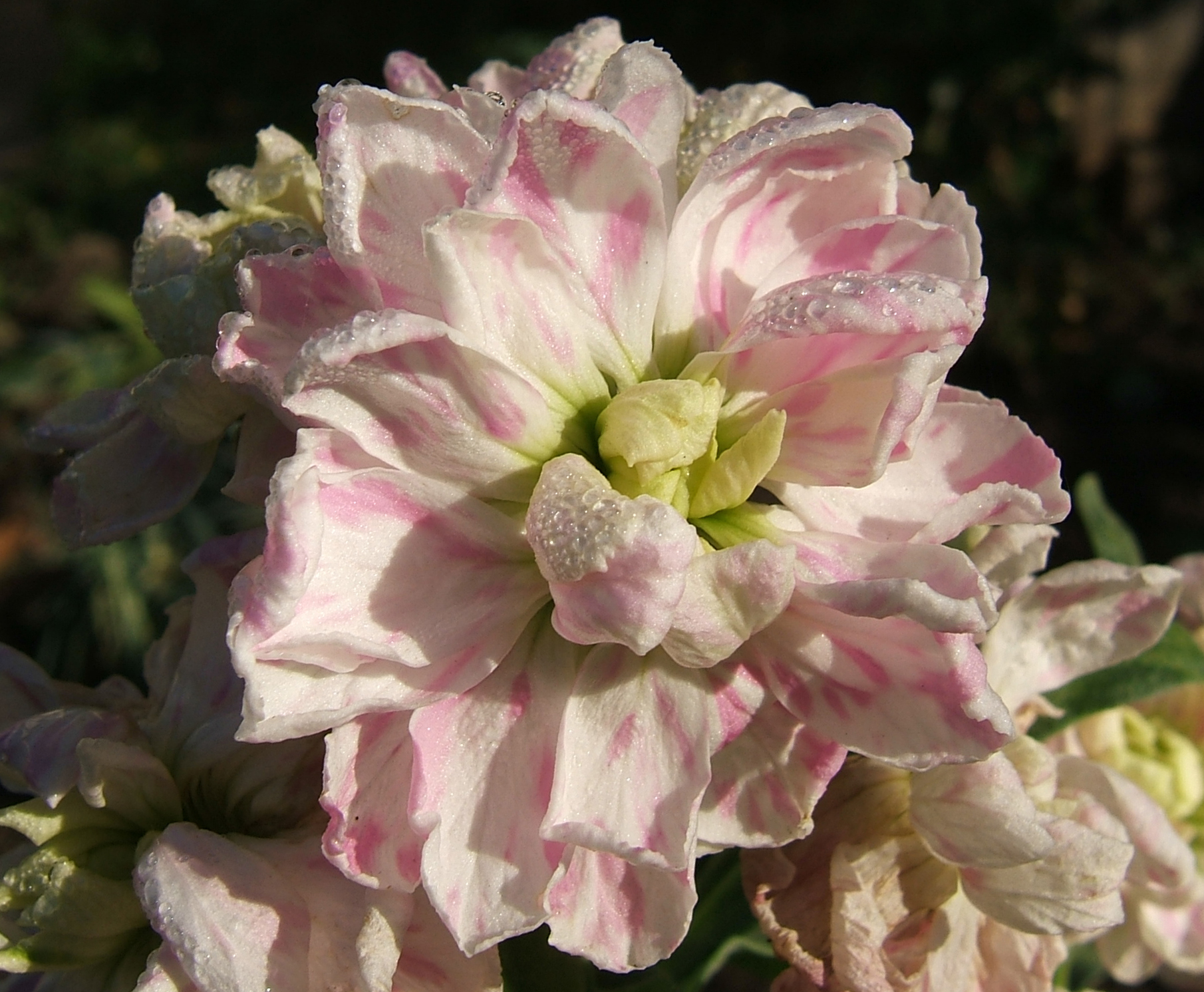
Matthiola incana

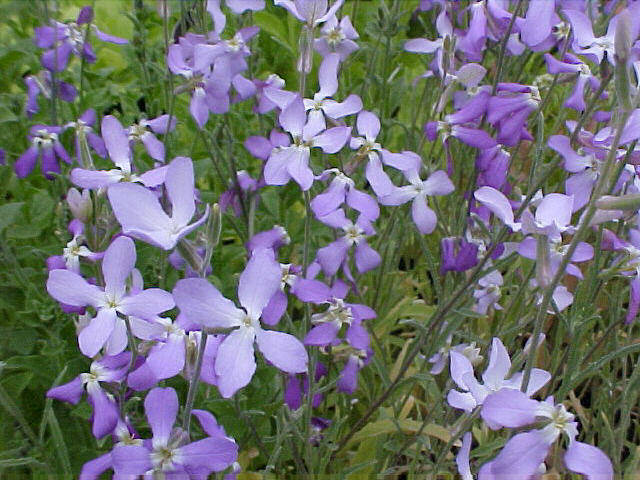
Matthiola longipetala

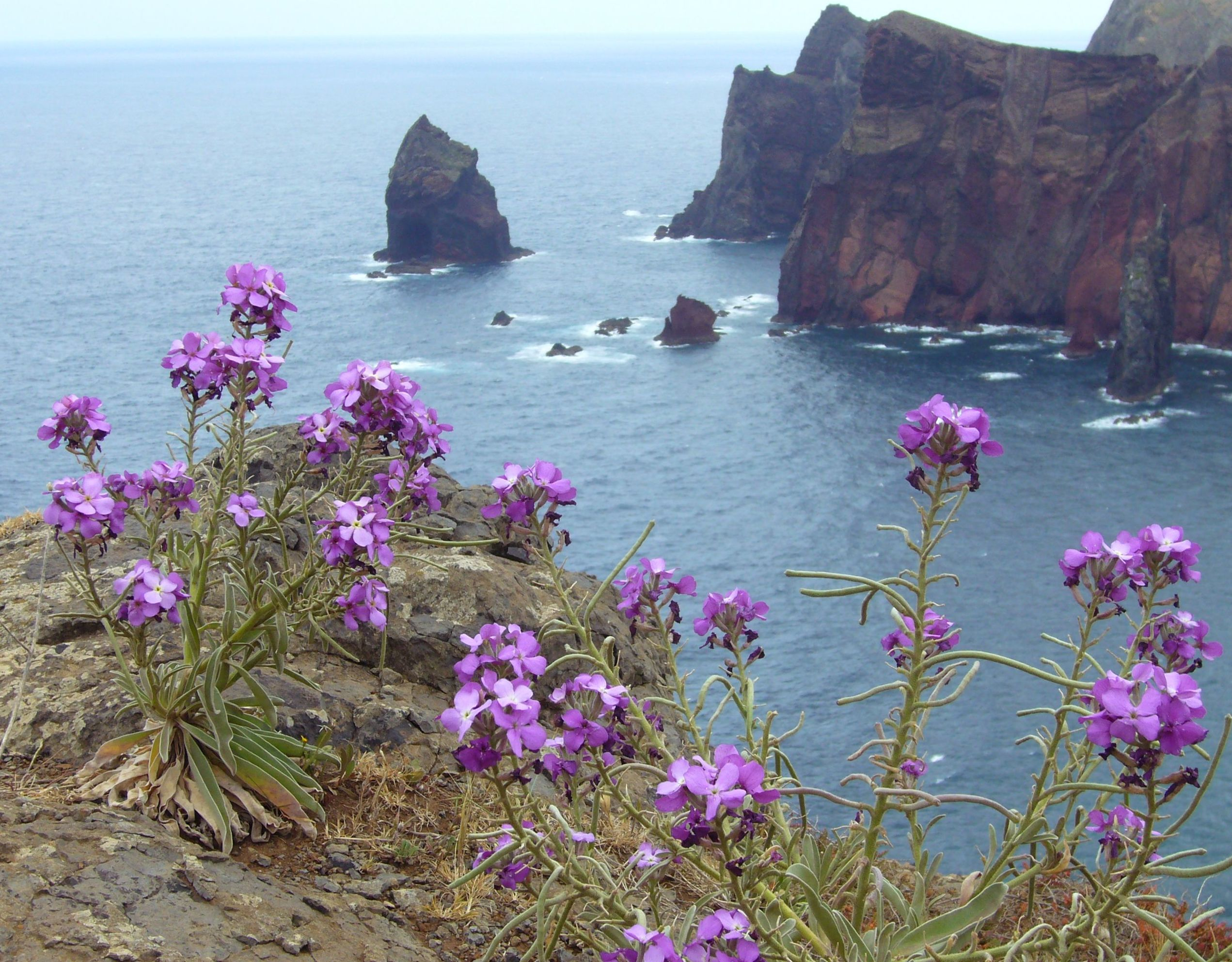
Matthiola maderensis

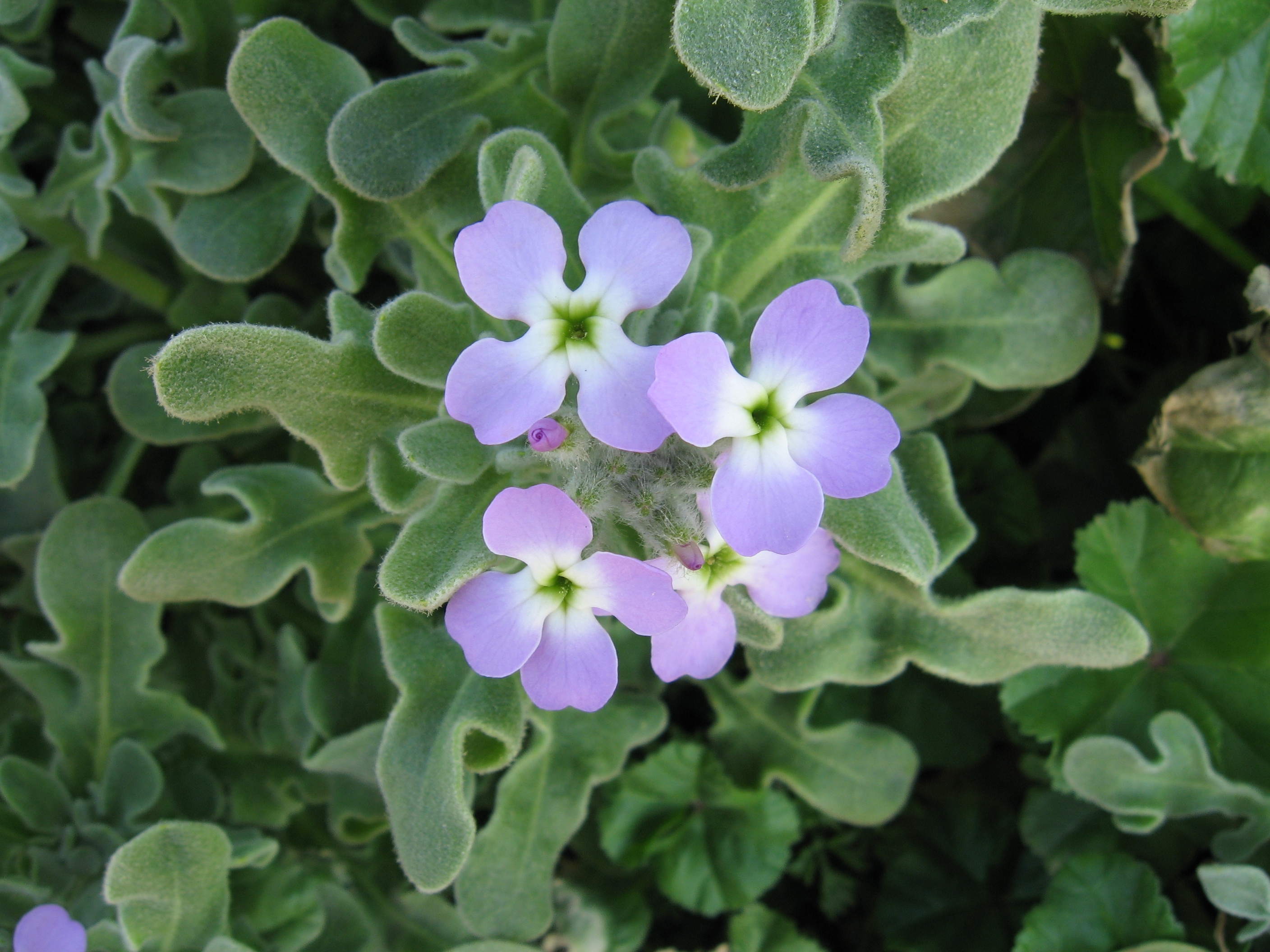
Matthiola tricuspidata

The following species are accepted:

- Matthiola afghanica Rech.f. & Köie
- Matthiola anchoniifolia Hub.-Mor.
- Matthiola arabica Boiss.
- Matthiola aspera Boiss.
- Matthiola boissieri Grossh.
- Matthiola bolleana Webb ex Christ
- Matthiola bucharica Czerniak.
- Matthiola caspica (N.Busch) Grossh.
- Matthiola chenopodiifolia Fisch. & C.A.Mey.
- Matthiola chorassanica Bunge ex Boiss.
- Matthiola codringtonii Rech.f.
- Matthiola crassifolia Boiss. & Gaill.
- Matthiola czerniakowskae Botsch. & Vved.
- Matthiola daghestanica (Conti) N.Busch
- Matthiola damascena Boiss.
- Matthiola dumulosa Boiss. & Buhse
- Matthiola erlangeriana Engl.
- Matthiola farinosa Bunge ex Boiss.
- Matthiola flavida Boiss.
- Matthiola fragrans (Fisch.) Bunge
- Matthiola fruticulosa (L.) Maire – sad stock
- Matthiola ghorana Rech.f.
- Matthiola glutinosa Jafri
- Matthiola graminea Rech.f.
- Matthiola incana (L.) W.T.Aiton – stock, hoary stock, gilly-flower
- Matthiola integrifolia Kom.
- Matthiola kralikii Pomel
- Matthiola livida (Delile) DC. – desert stock
- Matthiola longipetala (Vent.) DC. – night-scented stock
- Matthiola lunata DC.
- Matthiola macranica Rech.f.
- Matthiola maderensis Lowe
- Matthiola maroccana Coss.
- Matthiola montana Boiss.
- Matthiola obovata Bunge
- Matthiola odoratissima (M.Bieb.) W.T.Aiton
- Matthiola parviflora (Schousb.) W.T.Aiton
- Matthiola perennis Conti
- Matthiola perpusilla Rech.f.
- Matthiola puntensis Hedge & A.G.Mill.
- Matthiola revoluta Bunge ex Boiss.
- Matthiola robusta Bunge
- Matthiola scapifera Humbert
- Matthiola shehbazii Ranjbar & Karami
- Matthiola shiraziana Zeraatkar, Khosravi, F.Ghahrem., Al-Shehbaz & Assadi
- Matthiola sinuata (L.) W.T.Aiton – sea stock
- Matthiola spathulata Conti
- Matthiola stoddartii Bunge
- Matthiola superba Conti
- Matthiola tatarica (Pall.) DC.
- Matthiola taurica (Conti) Grossh.
- Matthiola tianschanica Sarkisova
- Matthiola tomentosa Bél.
- Matthiola torulosa (Thunb.) DC.
- Matthiola tricuspidata (L.) W.T.Aiton – three-horned stock
- Matthiola trojana Dirmenci, Satil & Tümen

== Gallery ==
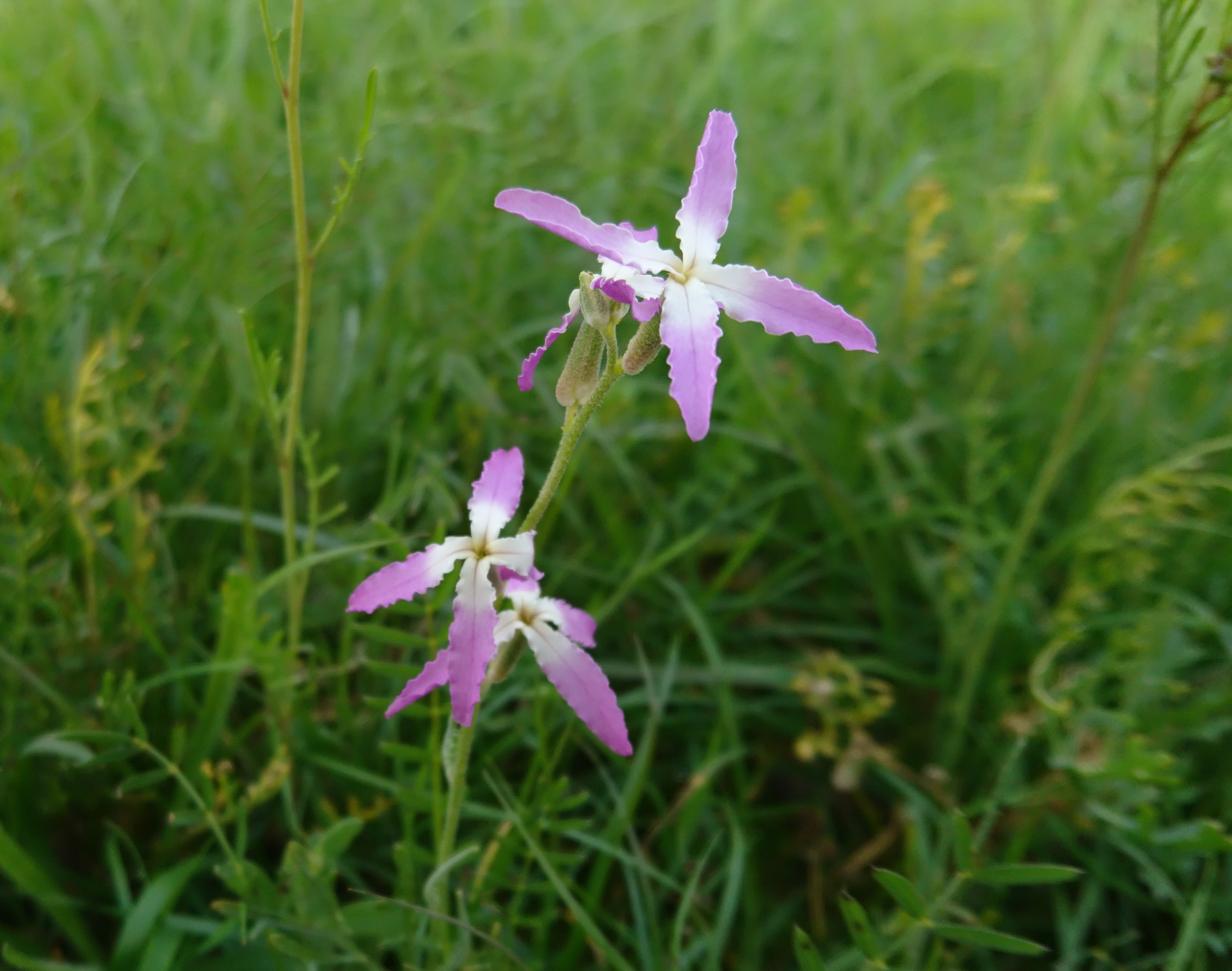
Wild Matthiola in Behbahan, Iran

Wild Matthiola in Behbahan, Iran
