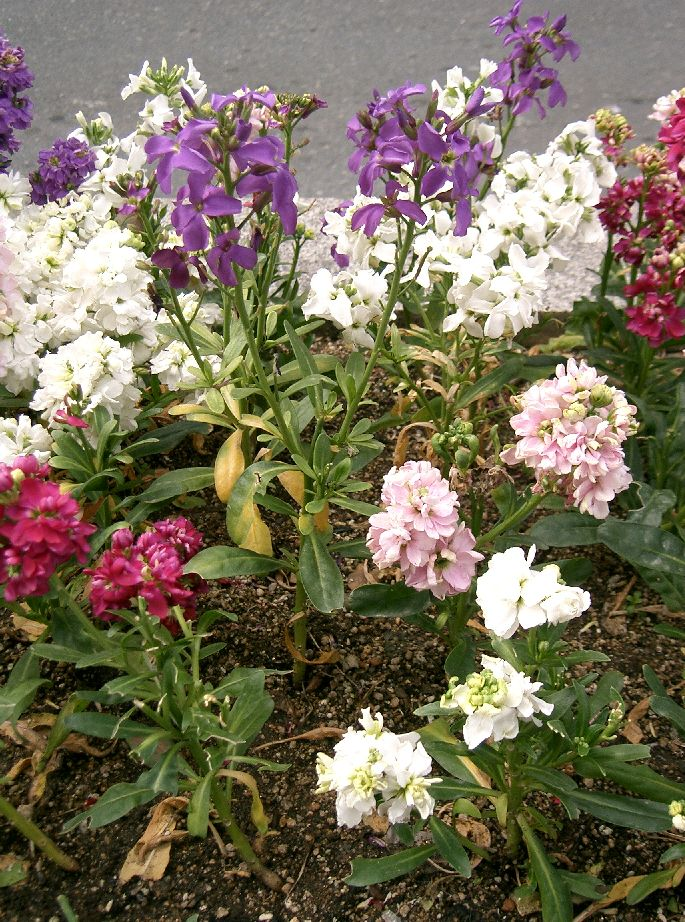

Scientific classification
- Kingdom: Plantae
- Clade: Tracheophytes
- Clade: Angiosperms
- Clade: Eudicots
- Clade: Rosids
- Order: Brassicales
- Family: Brassicaceae
- Genus: Matthiola
- Species: M. incana

Binomial name
- Matthiola incana (L.) W.T.Aiton

Subspecies
- 5; see text

Synonyms
- Cheiranthus incanus L.; Hesperis incana (L.) Kuntze; Mathiolaria incana (L.) Chevall.; Microstigma incanum (L.) Britton

= Matthiola incana =

Species of plant

Matthiola incana is a species of flowering plant in the cabbage family Brassicaceae. Common names include Brompton stock, common stock, hoary stock, ten-week stock, and gilly-flower. The common name stock usually refers to this species, though it may also be applied to the whole genus Matthiola. The common name "night-scented stock" or "evening-scented stock" is applied to Matthiola longipetala.

Matthiola incana is a common garden flower, available in a variety of colours, many of which are heavily scented and also used in floristry.

== Description ==
Some stocks are grown as annuals (the "ten-week stocks") that reach heights of growth of 20 to 28 centimeters thick, woody at the base and with numerous foliar scars and branches with terminal rosettes of leaves. The plants are starry, with whitish hairs. The leaves are rounded and ash-coloured. The fragrant flowers are white, cream yellow, pink, red, purple or blue. The scar flaps on the back are swollen. The pods are compressed, their flaps are flattened. Leaves whole or slightly sinuate, lanceolate, attenuated on a short petiole. Pedicels are 10–12 mm (0.39–0.47 in) in anthesis, 12–17 mm (0.47–0.67 in) in fruiting, erect-patents. Sepals are around 11–14 mm (0.43–0.55 in), with narrow scarious margin, subtle, green or somewhat purple. Petals are 25–30 mm (0.98–1.18 in), with a nail almost as long as the limb, ranging between white, pink, violet or purple. Seeds are 2–3 mm, suborbicular, with a whitish wing. The flower is supported by a 10–20 mm (0.39–0.79 in) stalk.

== Distribution ==
It is native to southern Europe from Spain to Greece, and is naturalized in the western part of the Mediterranean region, roughly in the same area as the olive tree. The plant prefers calcareous soils, and often grows on cliffs overlooking the sea, or on old walls. It is a plant of the coast, but it can be found, naturalized, even in the hinterland up to 600 m (1,970 ft) elevation.

== Subspecies ==
Five subspecies are accepted.

- Matthiola incana subsp. glandulifera (Lojac.) C.Brullo & Brullo – Sicily
- Matthiola incana subsp. incana – Spain to Greece
- Matthiola incana subsp. melitensis Brullo, Lanfr., Pavone & Ronsisv. – northern Malta and Gozo
- Matthiola incana subsp. pulchella (Conti) Brullo & Furnari – Pantelleria
- Matthiola incana subsp. rupestris (DC.) Nyman – southern Italy and Sicily

== Usage ==
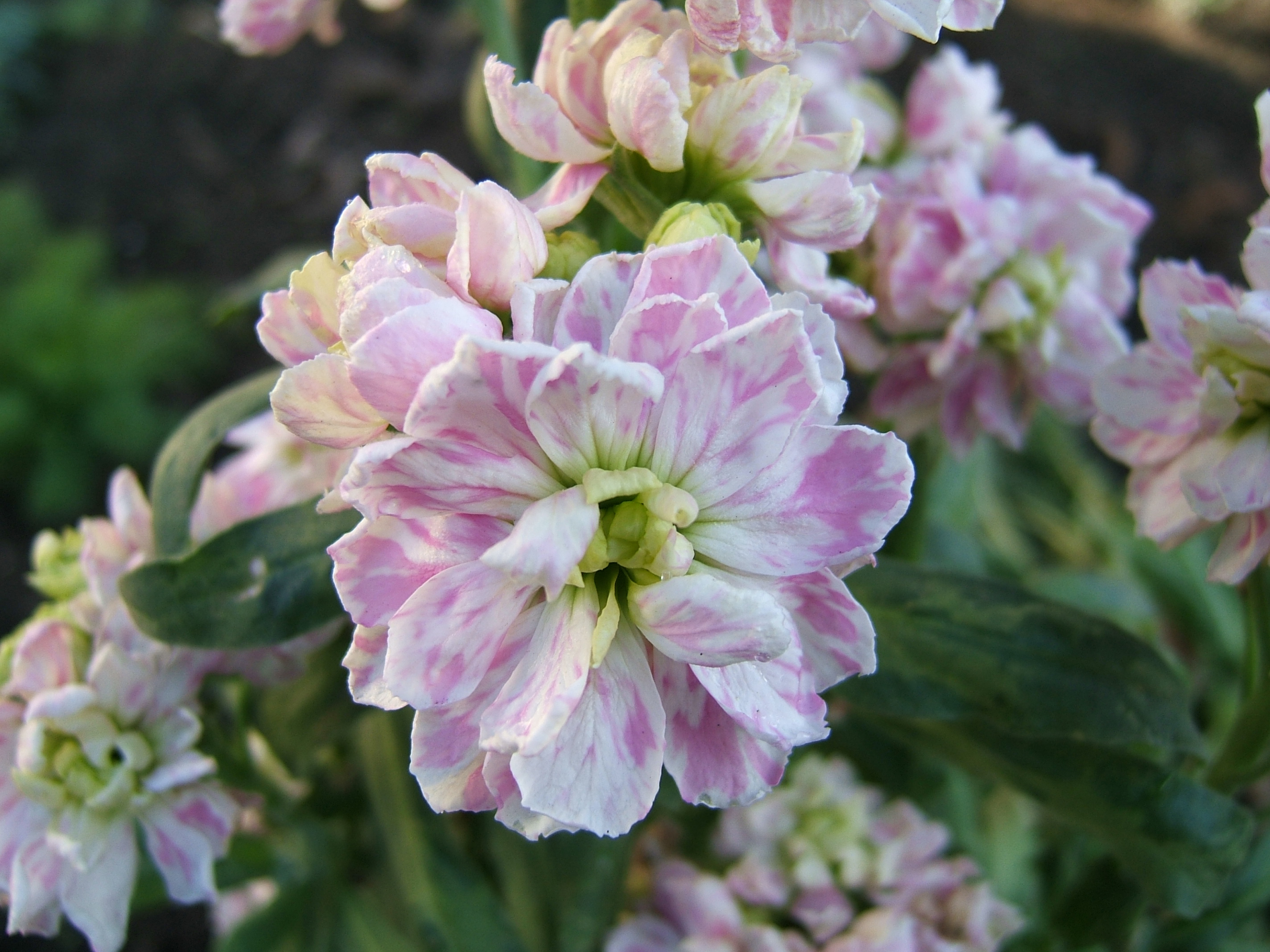
Double-flowered stock

Matthiola incana is widely used as an ornamental plant for summer bedding, and as a cut flower and aromatic plant. The species has been in cultivation since at least the 16th century. The flowers can be simple or double, medium or large.

== Varieties ==
These varieties are sown in spring (generally from March onwards in colder areas of the Northern Hemisphere, earlier in regions with mild winters). Other varieties take longer to develop and are treated as biennials. These are often referred to as "Brompton stocks". In cool temperate regions they are generally sown in summer (June and July) to flower in the following spring. The extra trouble of overwintering the plants is compensated for by the showy spring floral display. In hard winters there may be some mortality and a well-drained sheltered site suits them best.

Intermediate varieties (sometimes called "East Lothian" stocks as they originated in southern Scotland) may be treated either as annuals or biennials. If treated as annuals they give a fine late summer and autumn display. Maltese stocks (Matthiola incana ssp. melitensis), known in Maltese as "ġiżi ta' Malta", is treated as a perennial and has fleshier and fuzzy leaves with flowers in a light violet colour, while an even rarer variety of it exhibits white flowers. 'Cinderella series' has gained the Royal Horticultural Society's Award of Garden Merit.

== Genetics ==
Double-flowered stocks are prized by gardeners for their floral display but are sterile. They therefore have to be produced from the seed of single-flowered plants. The double-flowered form is caused by a recessive gene variant (allele) in the homozygous condition. Therefore, according to the Mendelian laws of genetics, heterozygous single-flowered stocks should produce one quarter doubles in their offspring and one third of the singles should be pure breeding singles incapable of throwing doubles.

Selection over the centuries has greatly improved these ratios, resulting in the so-called "ever-sporting" stocks, in which pure-breeding singles are absent and the proportion of doubles is one half or greater. The reason was first worked out by the Danish geneticist Øjvind Winge. In these varieties, the singleness allele is closely linked to a pollen-lethal gene. Thus the pollen (male) contribution to seed is always a doubleness allele, while the female contribution is either a doubleness or a singleness allele. The result of this linkage is that doubles and singles are produced in 50:50 ratios and there are no pure-breeding singles.

Furthermore, many modern strains produce doubles in even higher proportions: 60% or even 80%. This is due to generations of selection for further linked viability effects, producing higher mortality of heterozygous singles, relative to homozygous doubles.

== Gallery ==
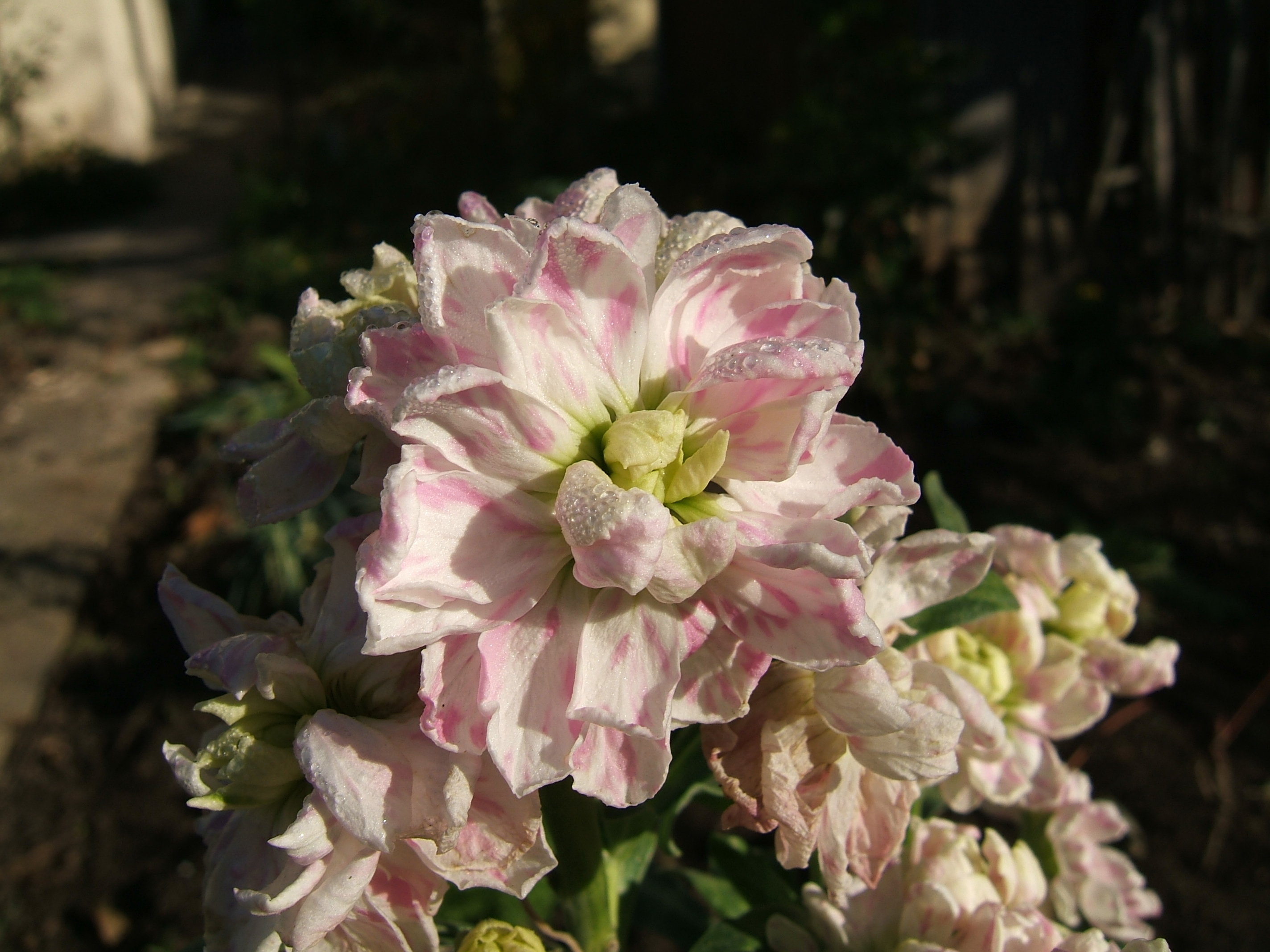
Pink flowers

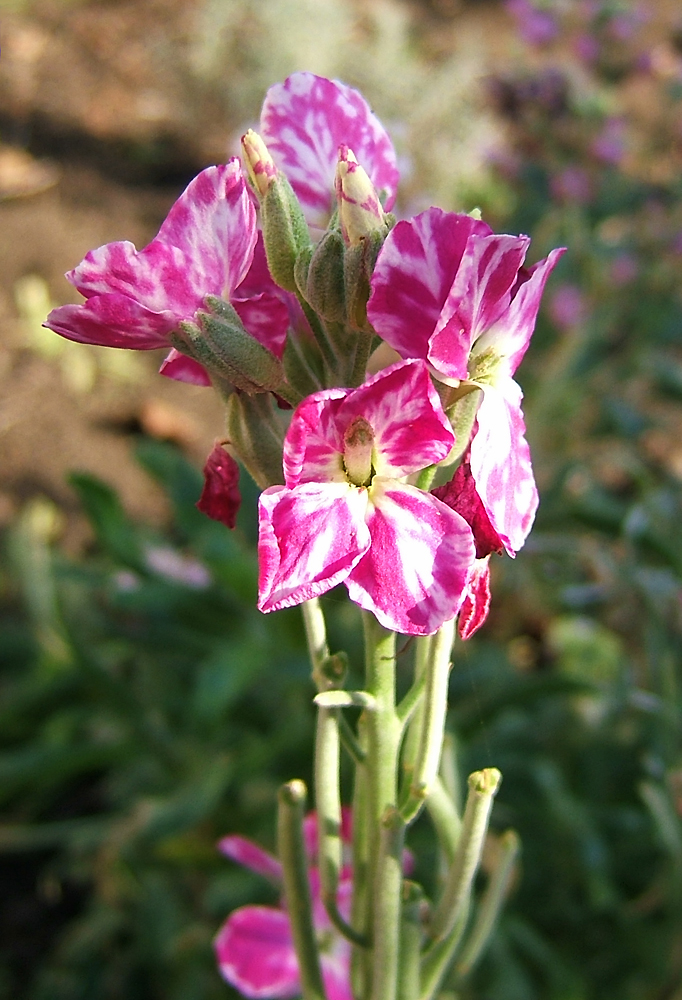
Purple flowers

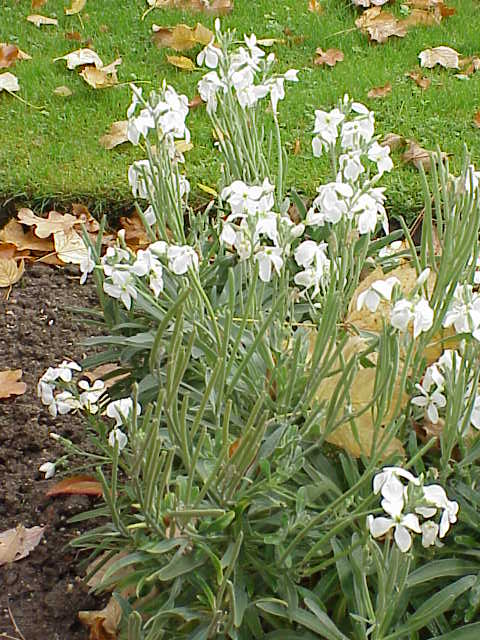
White flowers

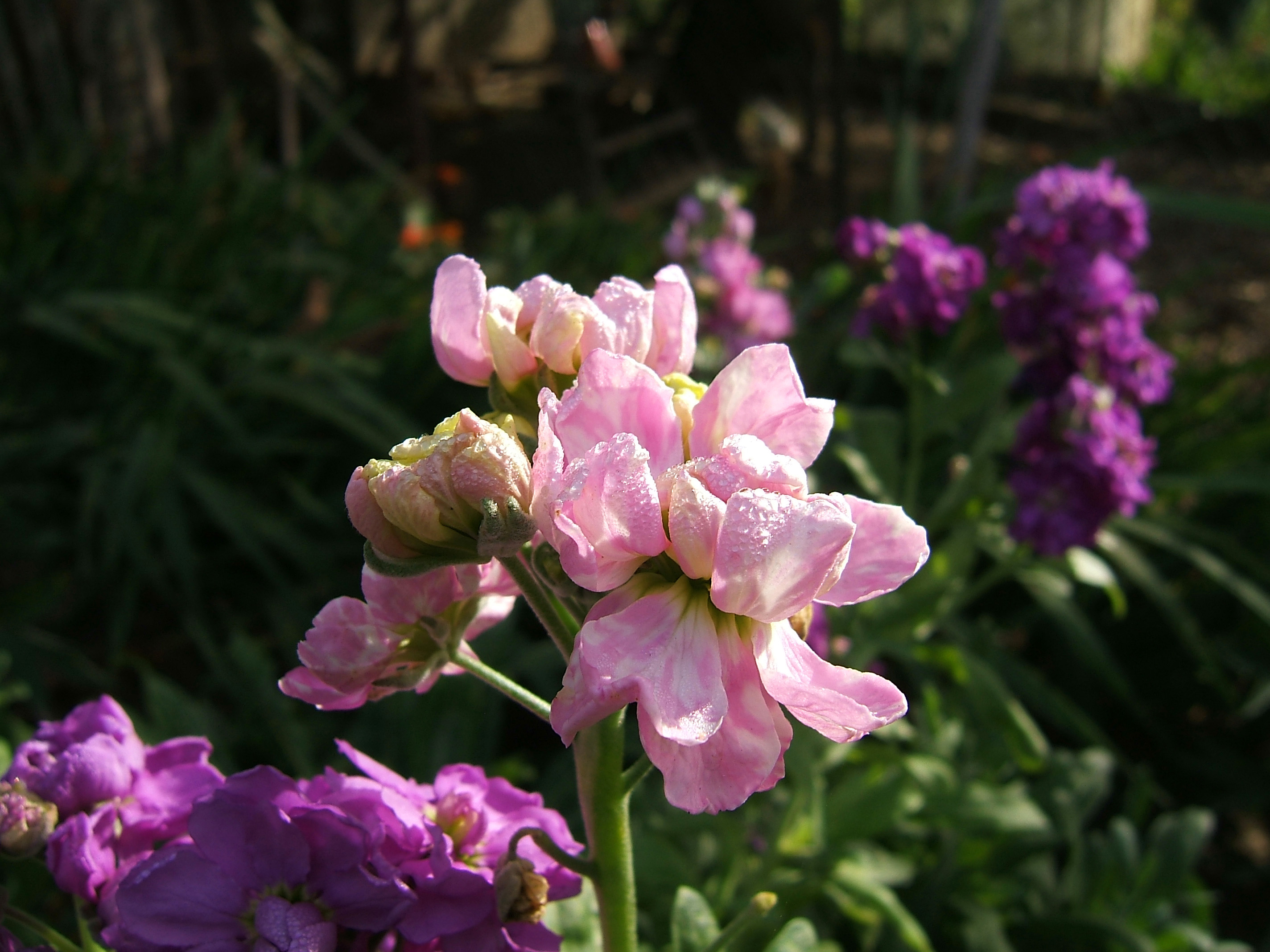
In garden

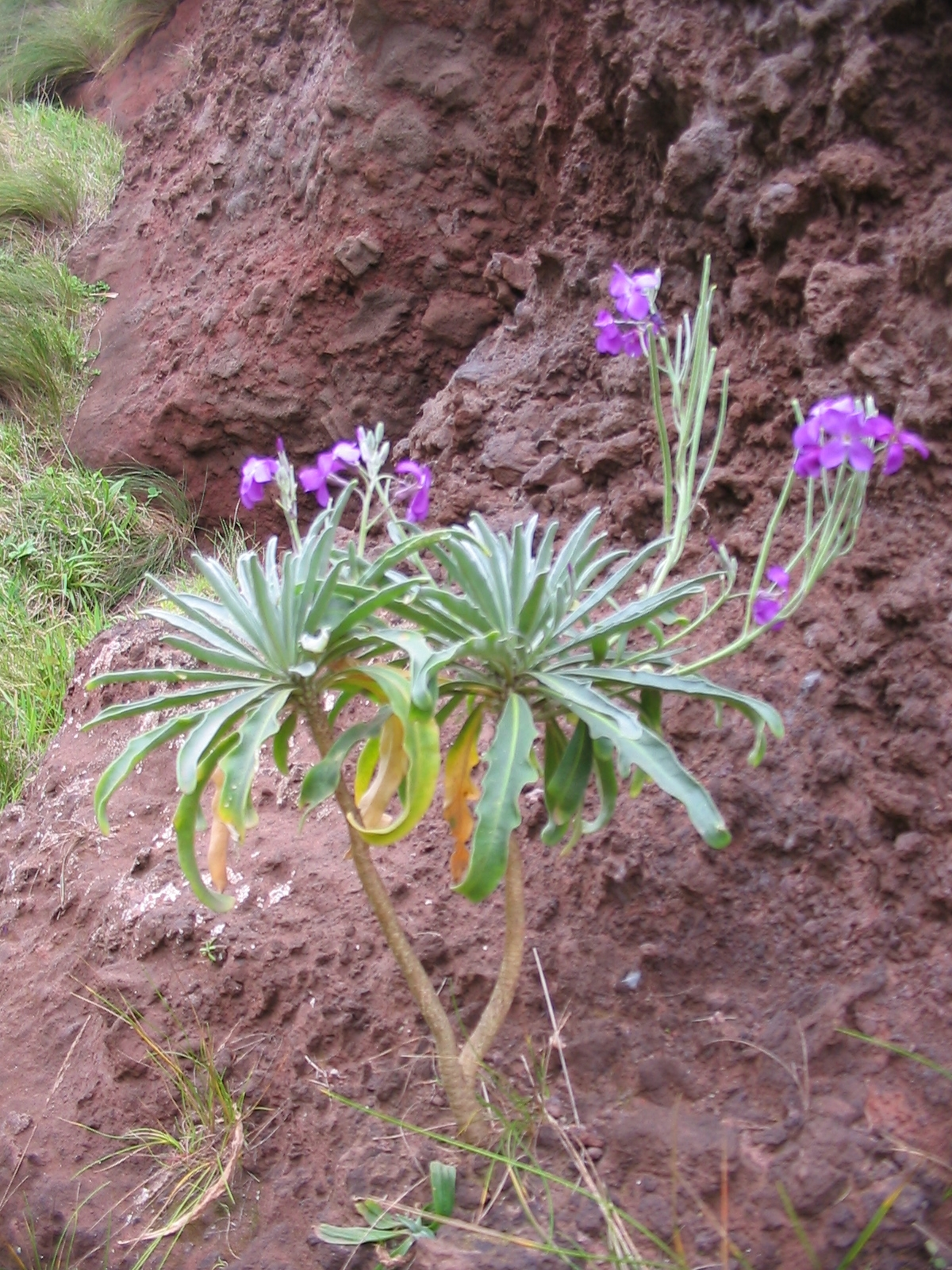
In the wild

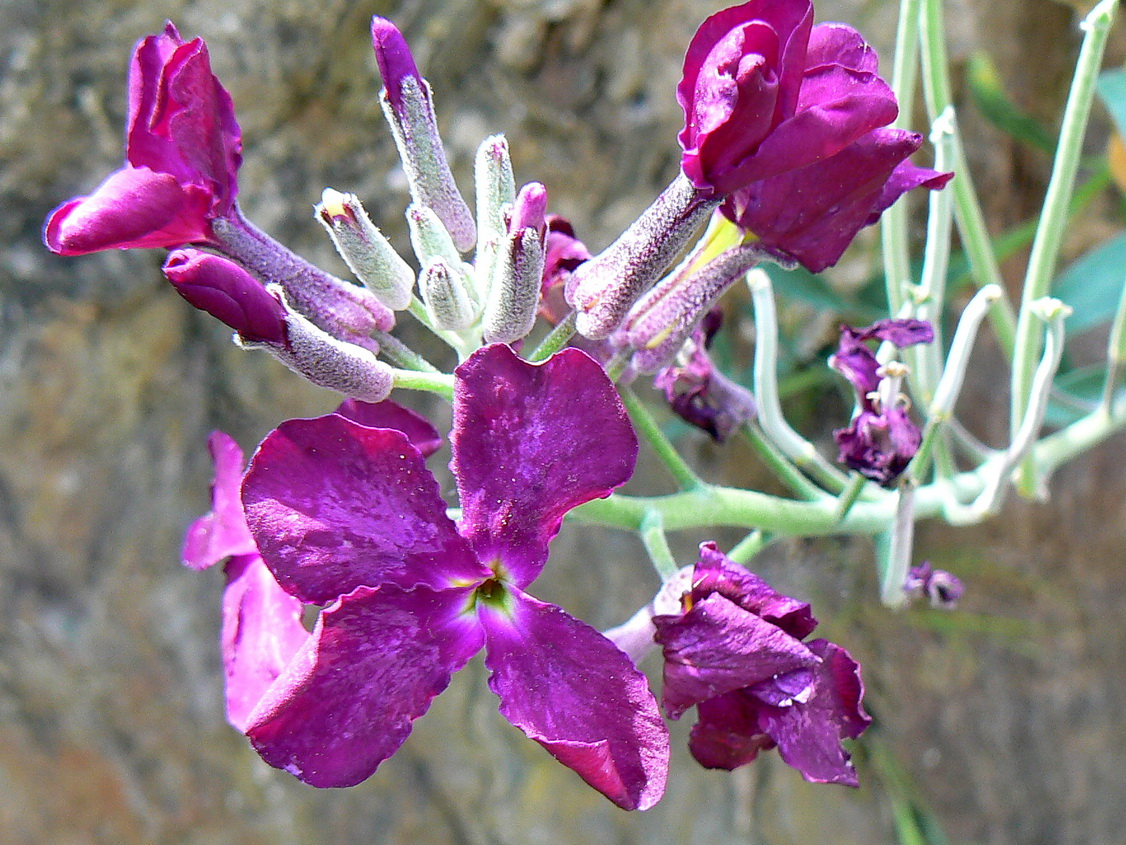
Wild flowers

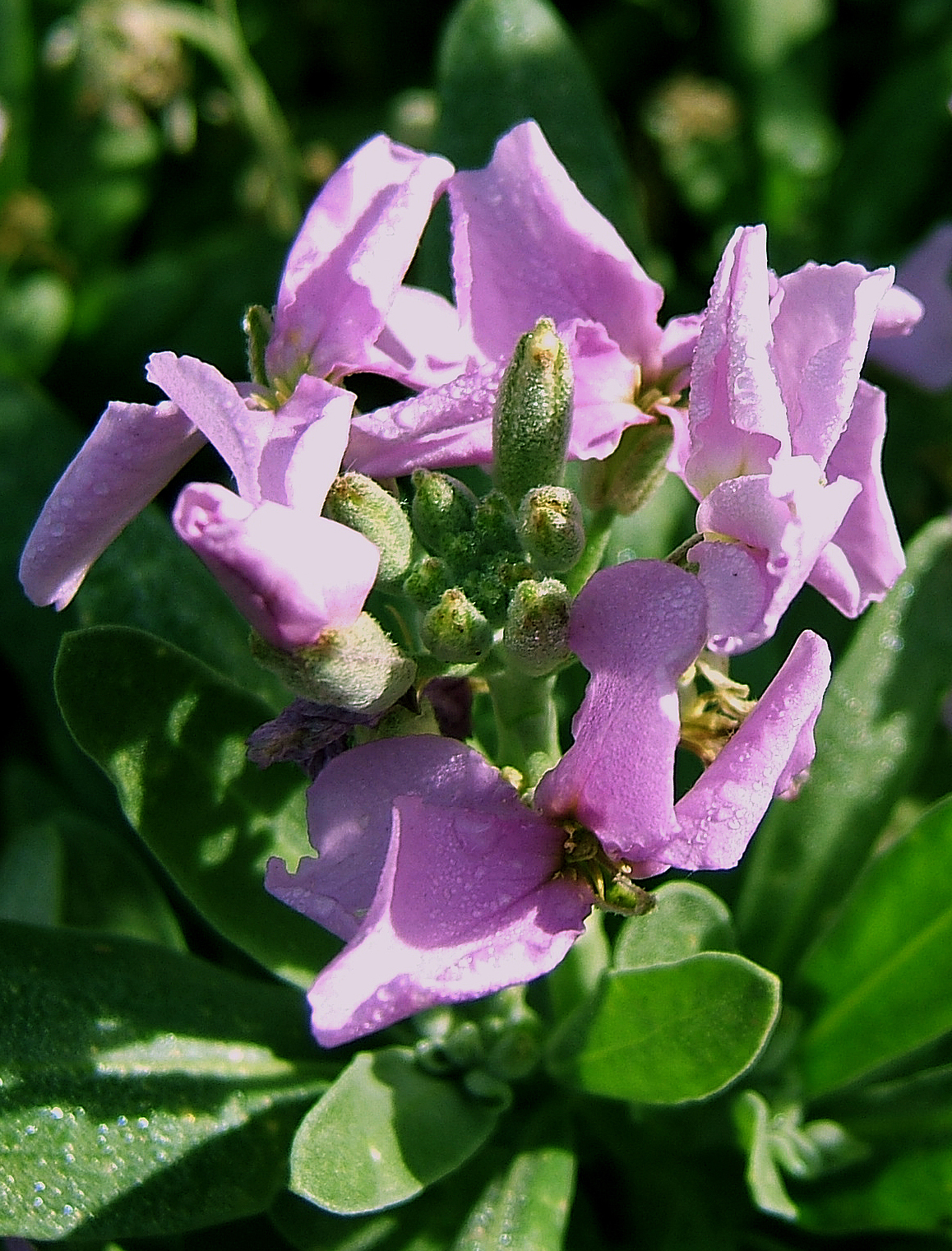
Emerging flowers

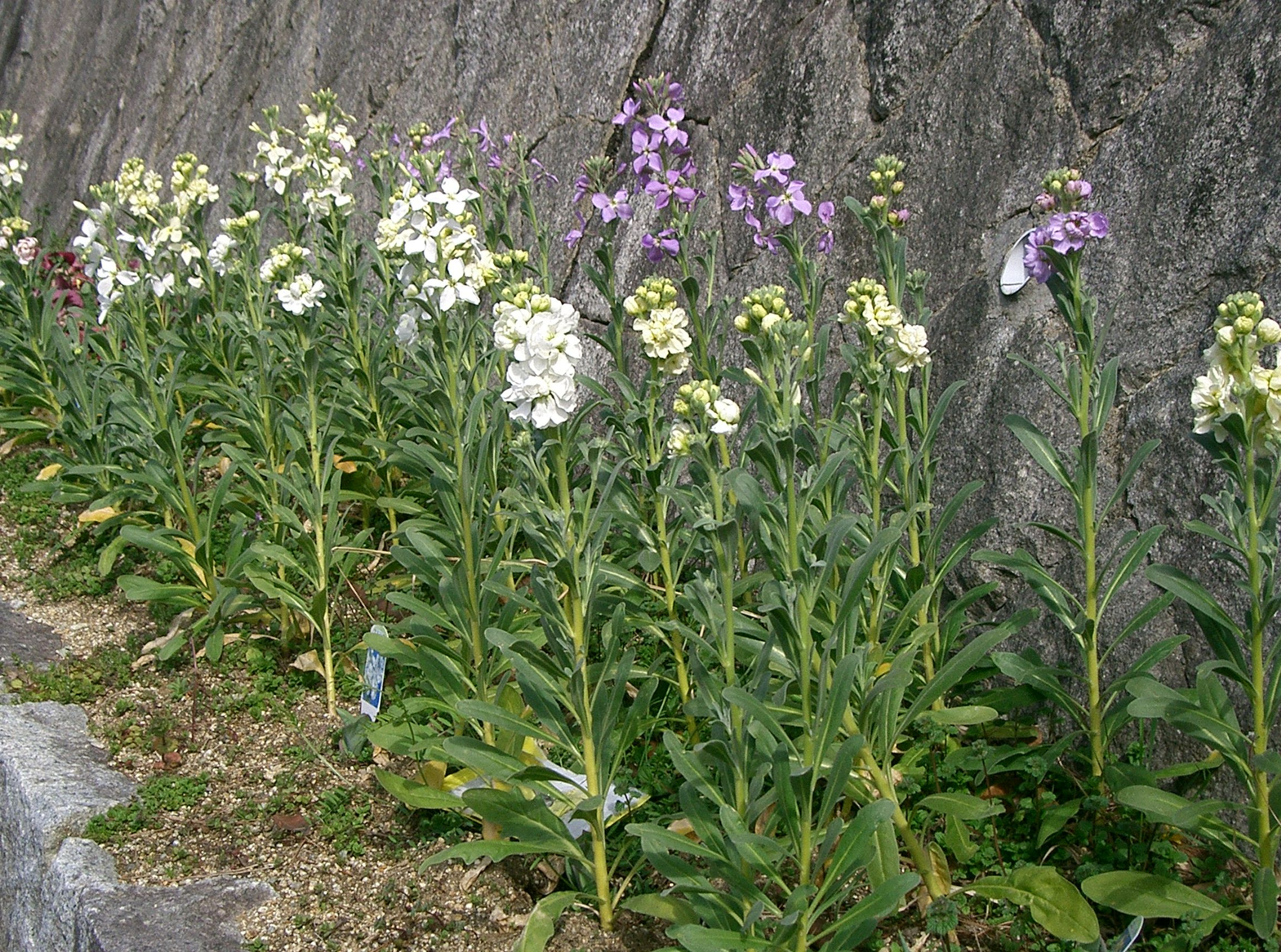
Variety in wild
