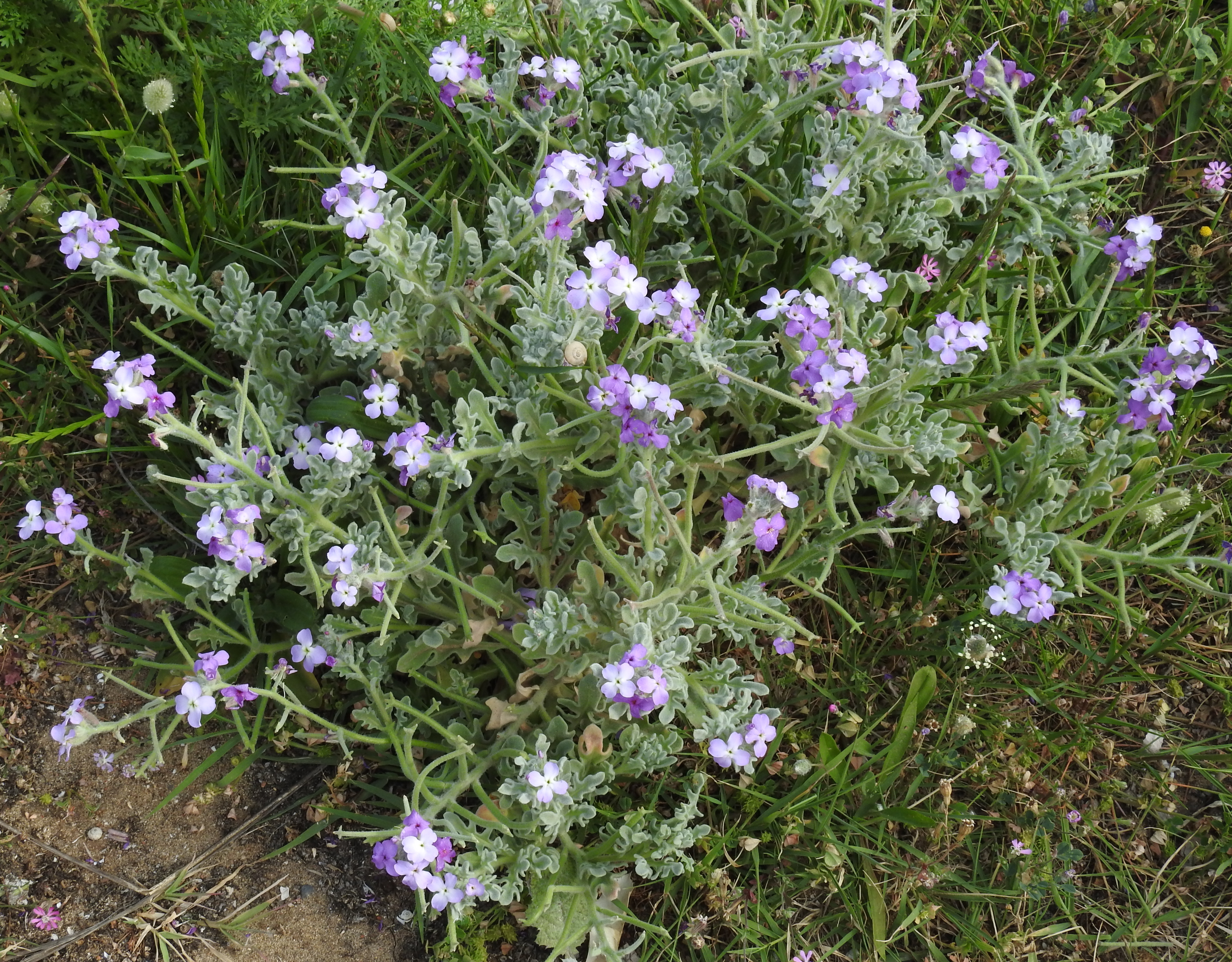
- Habit, with the three horns of the stocks visible
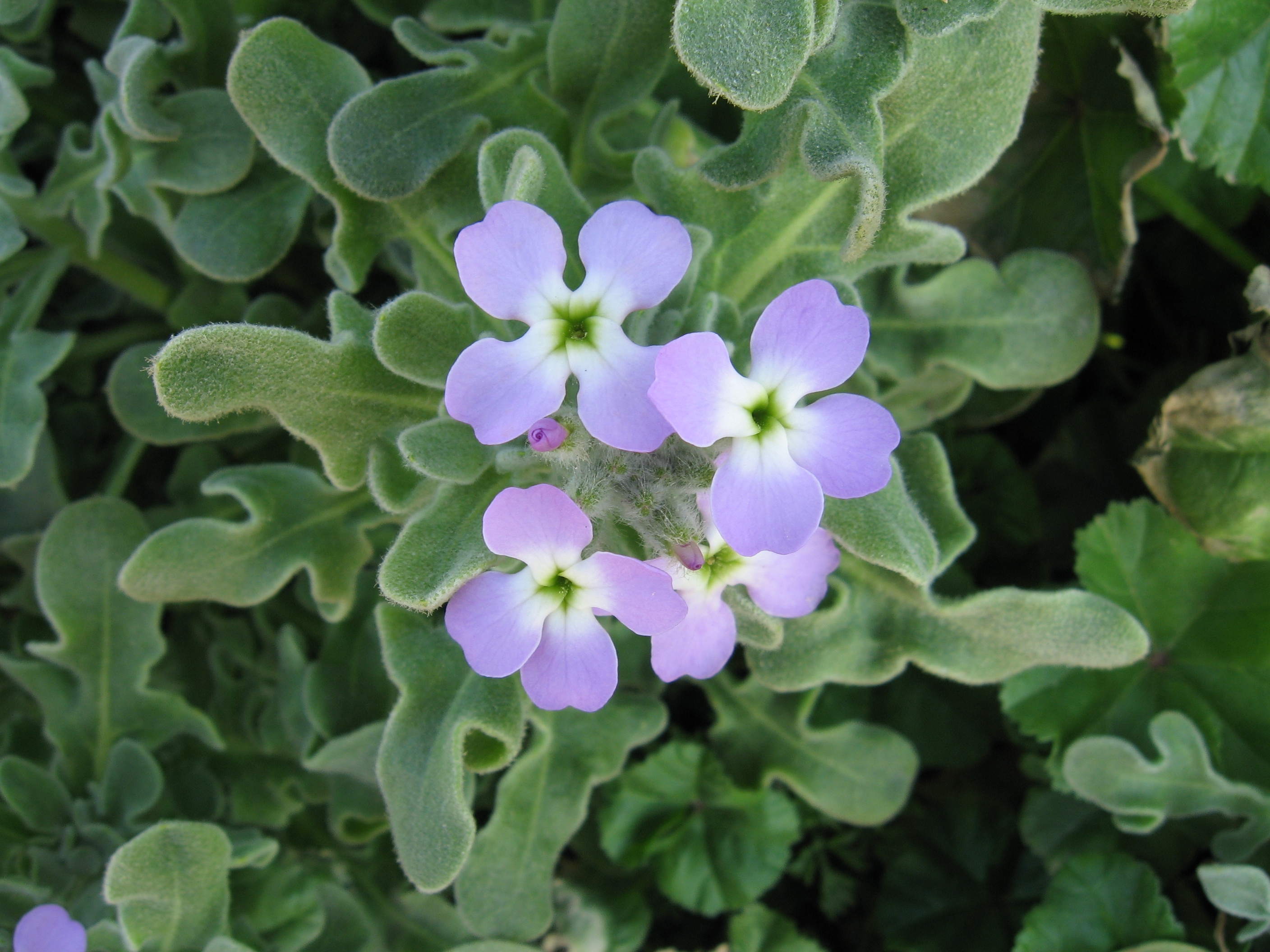
- Close-up of flowers

Scientific classification
- Kingdom: Plantae
- Clade: Tracheophytes
- Clade: Angiosperms
- Clade: Eudicots
- Clade: Rosids
- Order: Brassicales
- Family: Brassicaceae
- Genus: Matthiola
- Species: M. tricuspidata

Binomial name
- Matthiola tricuspidata (L.) W.T.Aiton

Synonyms
- List: Cheiranthus tricuspidatus L.; Cheiranthus villosus Forssk.; Hesperis tricuspidata (L.) Lam.; Hesperis villosa Poir.; Triceras tricuspidatum (L.) Maire

= Matthiola tricuspidata =

Species of flowering plant

Matthiola tricuspidata, the three-horned stock, is a widespread species of flowering plant in the family Brassicaceae, native to the shores of the Mediterranean. A halophyte, it is found in coastal stable dune grassland and coastal dune scrub, but not on shifting coastal dunes.
