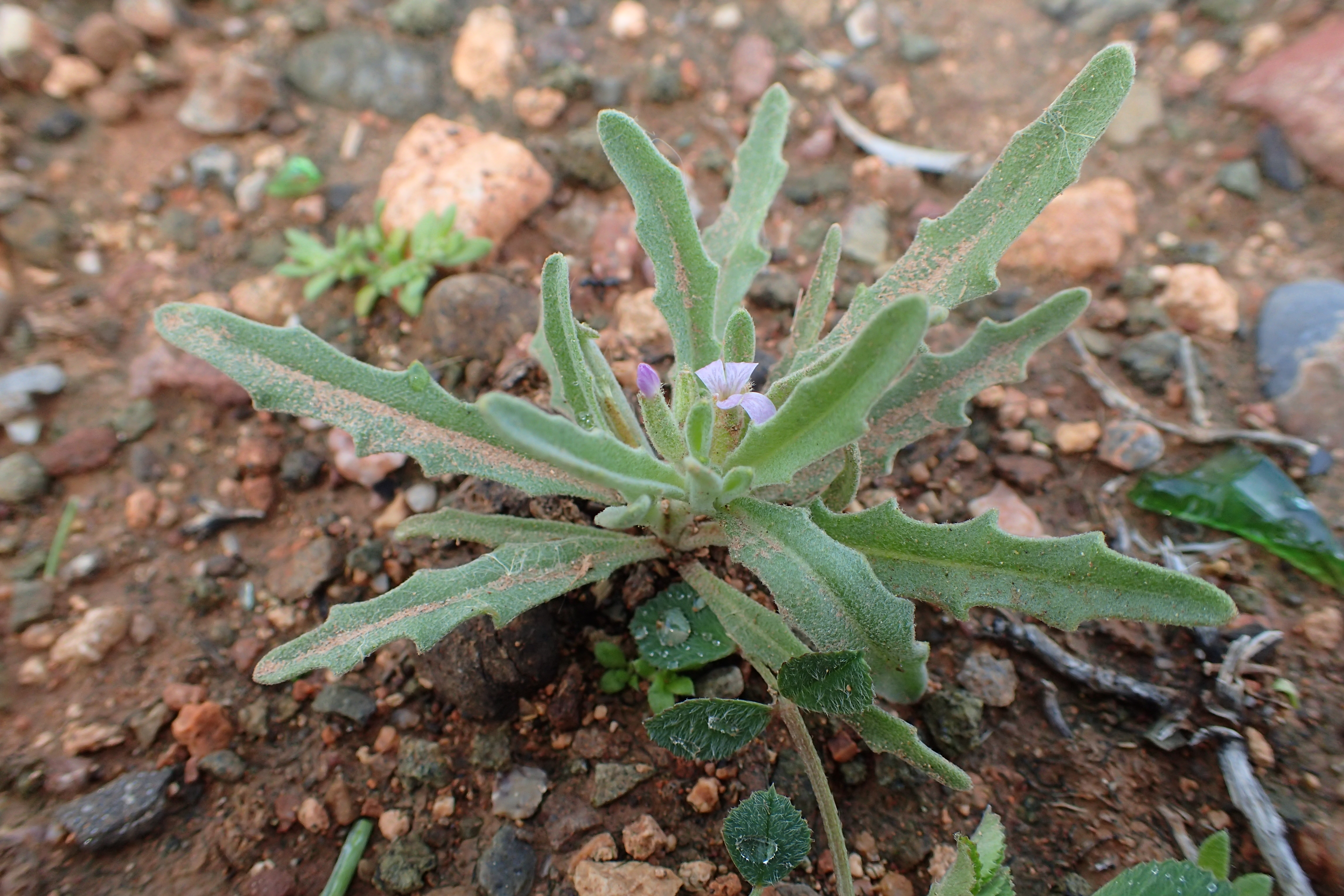
- Habit
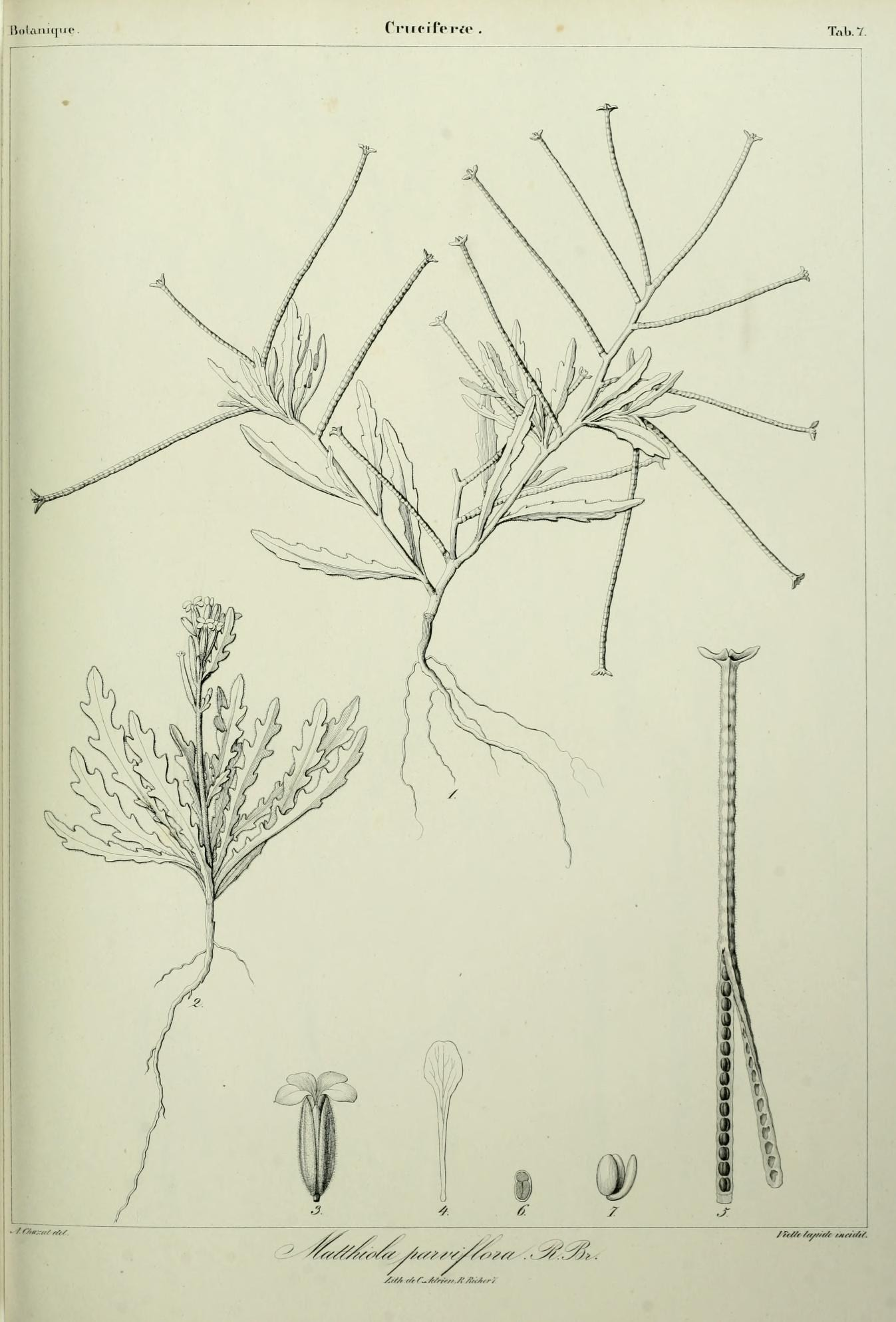
- Botanical illustration

Scientific classification
- Kingdom: Plantae
- Clade: Embryophytes
- Clade: Tracheophytes
- Clade: Angiosperms
- Clade: Eudicots
- Clade: Rosids
- Order: Brassicales
- Family: Brassicaceae
- Genus: Matthiola
- Species: M. parviflora

Binomial name
- Matthiola parviflora (Schousb.) W.T.Aiton

Synonyms
- Cheiranthus parviflorus Schousb.; Hesperis micrantha Kuntze; Hesperis parviflora (Schousb.) Poir.

= Matthiola parviflora =

Species of flowering plant

Matthiola parviflora, the smallflower stock, is a species of flowering plant in the family Brassicaceae, native to Madeira, the Canary Islands, the Iberian Peninsula, North Africa, Israel and Jordan. It has been discovered invading the Sonoran Desert, beginning around Tucson, Arizona.
