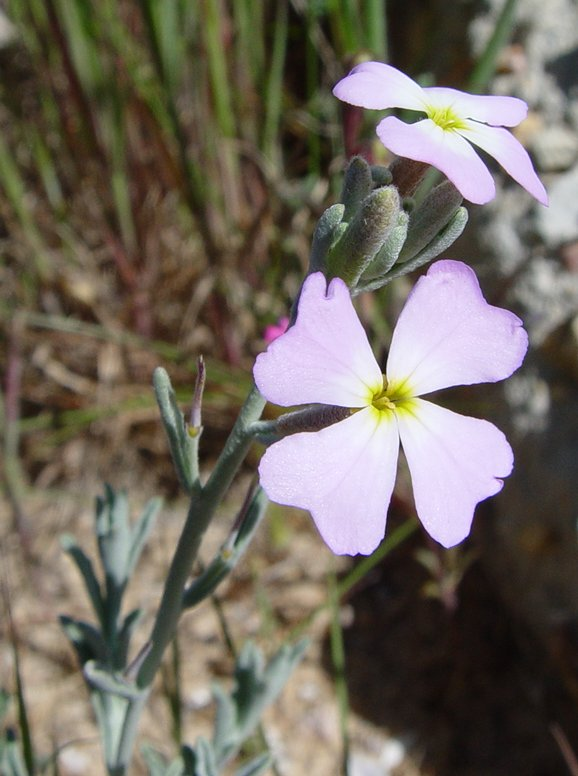
- Malcomia littorea

Scientific classification
- Kingdom: Plantae
- Clade: Tracheophytes
- Clade: Angiosperms
- Clade: Eudicots
- Clade: Rosids
- Order: Brassicales
- Family: Brassicaceae
- Genus: Malcolmia; W.T.Aiton

Species
- 11; see text

Synonyms
- Wilckia Scop.

= Malcolmia =

Genus of flowering plants

Malcolmia is a genus of flowering plants from the family Brassicaceae. It includes 11 species native to the Mediterranean basin (North Africa and southeastern Europe), Western Asia, the Transcaucasus, Central Asia, and Pakistan.

Several species are cultivated for their flowers, including Virginia stock (Malcolmia maritima).

== Species ==
11 species are accepted.

- Malcolmia chia (L.) DC.
- Malcolmia doumetiana (Coss.) Rouy
- Malcolmia flexuosa (Sm.) Sm.
- Malcolmia graeca Boiss. & Spruner
- Malcolmia × hybrida Hausskn.
- Malcolmia komarovii Vassilcz.
- Malcolmia macrocalyx (Halácsy) Rech.
- Malcolmia malcolmioides (Coss. & Durieu) Greuter & Burdet
- Malcolmia orsiniana (Ten.) Ten.
- Malcolmia pygmaea (DC.) Boiss.
- Malcolmia taraxacifolia Balb.

=== Formerly placed here ===
- Strigosella africana (L.) Botsch. (as Malcolmia africana (L.) W.T.Aiton)
