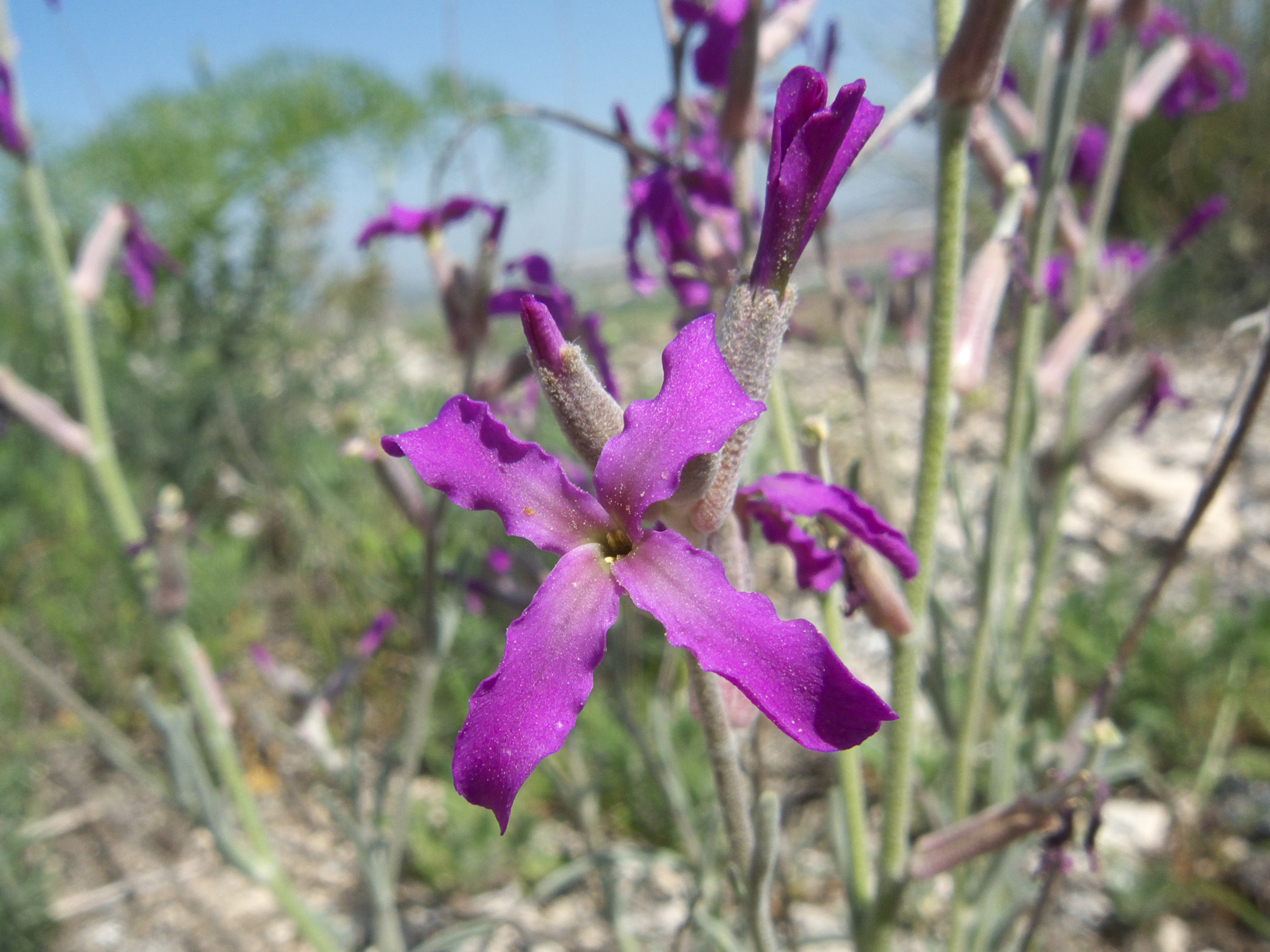
- A particularly dark flower
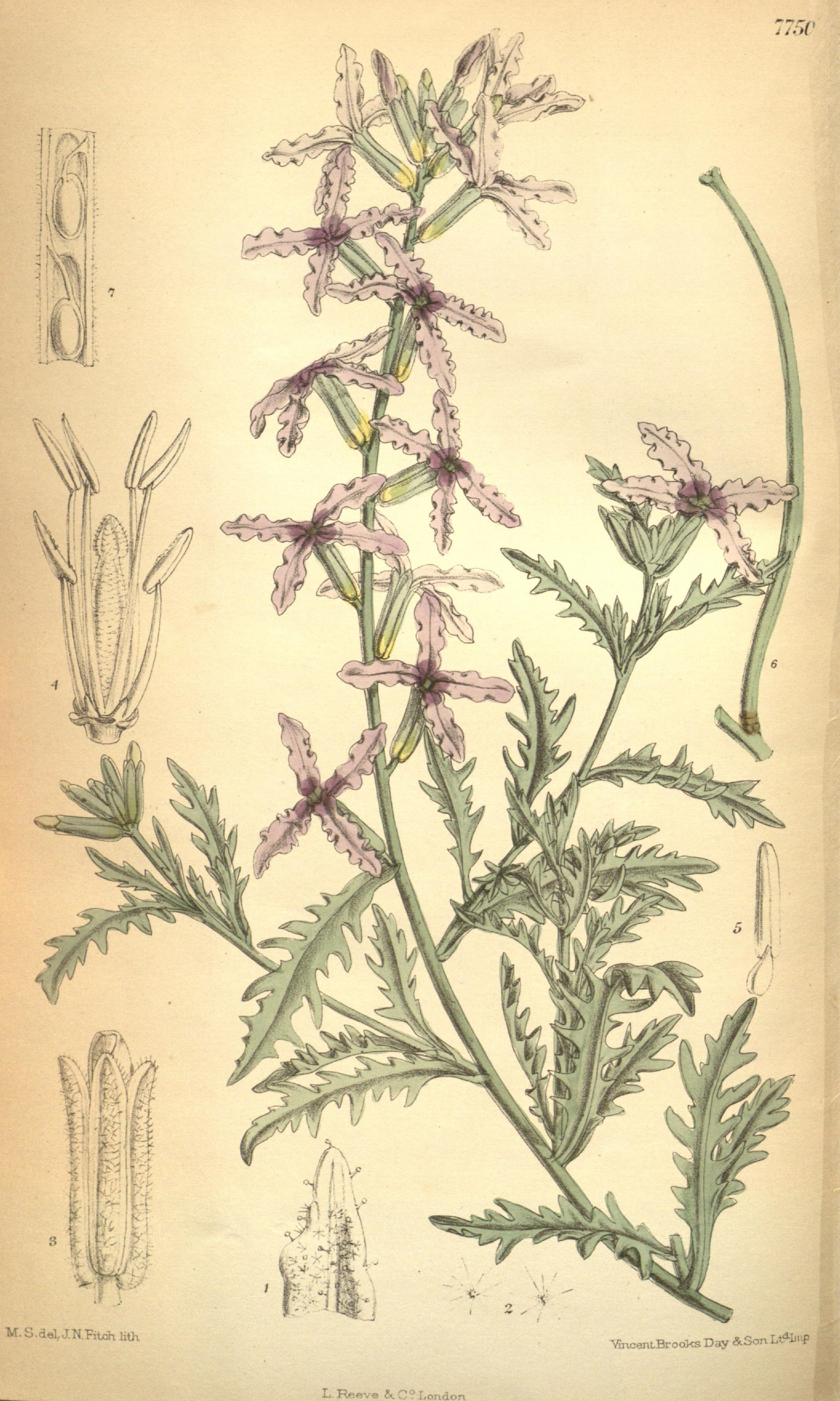
- Botanical illustration

Scientific classification
- Kingdom: Plantae
- Clade: Tracheophytes
- Clade: Angiosperms
- Clade: Eudicots
- Clade: Rosids
- Order: Brassicales
- Family: Brassicaceae
- Genus: Matthiola
- Species: M. fruticulosa

Binomial name
- Matthiola fruticulosa (L.) Maire

Synonyms
- List: Cheiranthus coronopifolius Sm.; Cheiranthus fruticulosus L.; Cheiranthus parviflorus Thibaud ex DC.; Cheiranthus tristis L.; Hesperis angustifolia Lam.; Hesperis coronopifolia Poir. ex Steud.; Hesperis provincialis L.; Hesperis thessala (Boiss. & Orph.) Kuntze; Matthiola coronopifolia (Sm.) DC.; Matthiola fruticulosa subsp. coronopifolia (Sm.) Giardina & Raimondo; Matthiola fruticulosa var. provincialis (L.) O.Bolòs & Vigo; Matthiola fruticulosa var. rigualii O.Bolòs & Vigo; Matthiola montana Pomel; Matthiola provincialis (L.) Markgr.; Matthiola sabauda Chodat; Matthiola stenopetala Pomel; Matthiola telum Pomel; Matthiola thessala Boiss. & Orph.; Matthiola tristis (L.) W.T.Aiton; Triceras fruticulosum (L.) Maire

= Matthiola fruticulosa =

Species of flowering plant

Matthiola fruticulosa, the sad stock or dark-flowered stock, is a species of flowering plant in the family Brassicaceae, native to the Mediterranean region. It is adapted to clay and marl soil types.
