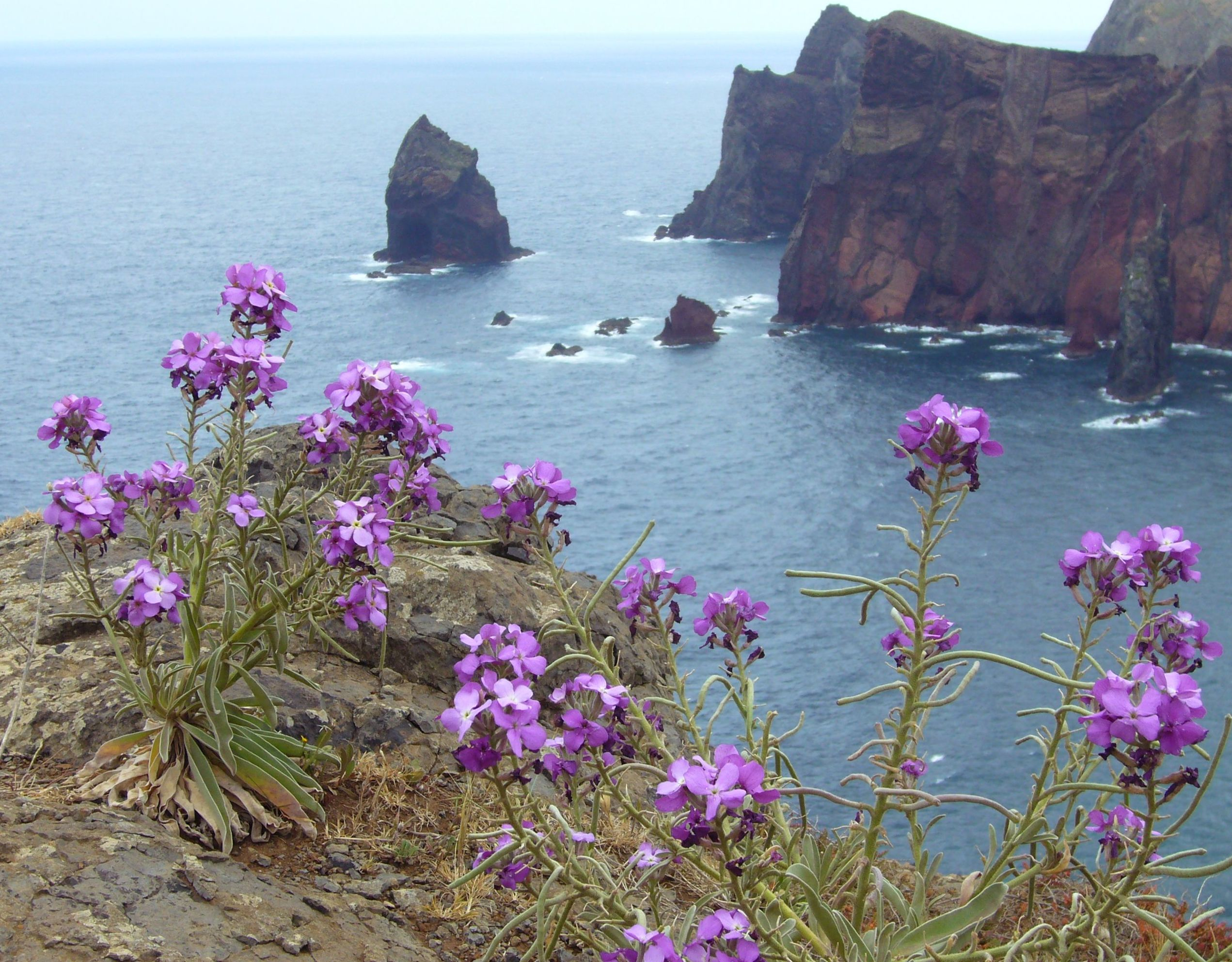
- Matthiola maderensis at the north of Ponta de São Lourenço

Scientific classification
- Kingdom: Plantae
- Clade: Tracheophytes
- Clade: Angiosperms
- Clade: Eudicots
- Clade: Rosids
- Order: Brassicales
- Family: Brassicaceae
- Genus: Matthiola
- Species: M. maderensis

Binomial name
- Matthiola maderensis Lowe

= Matthiola maderensis =

Species of flowering plant

Matthiola maderensis is a flowering plant species of the family Brassicaceae. It is endemic to the Madeira Archipelago.

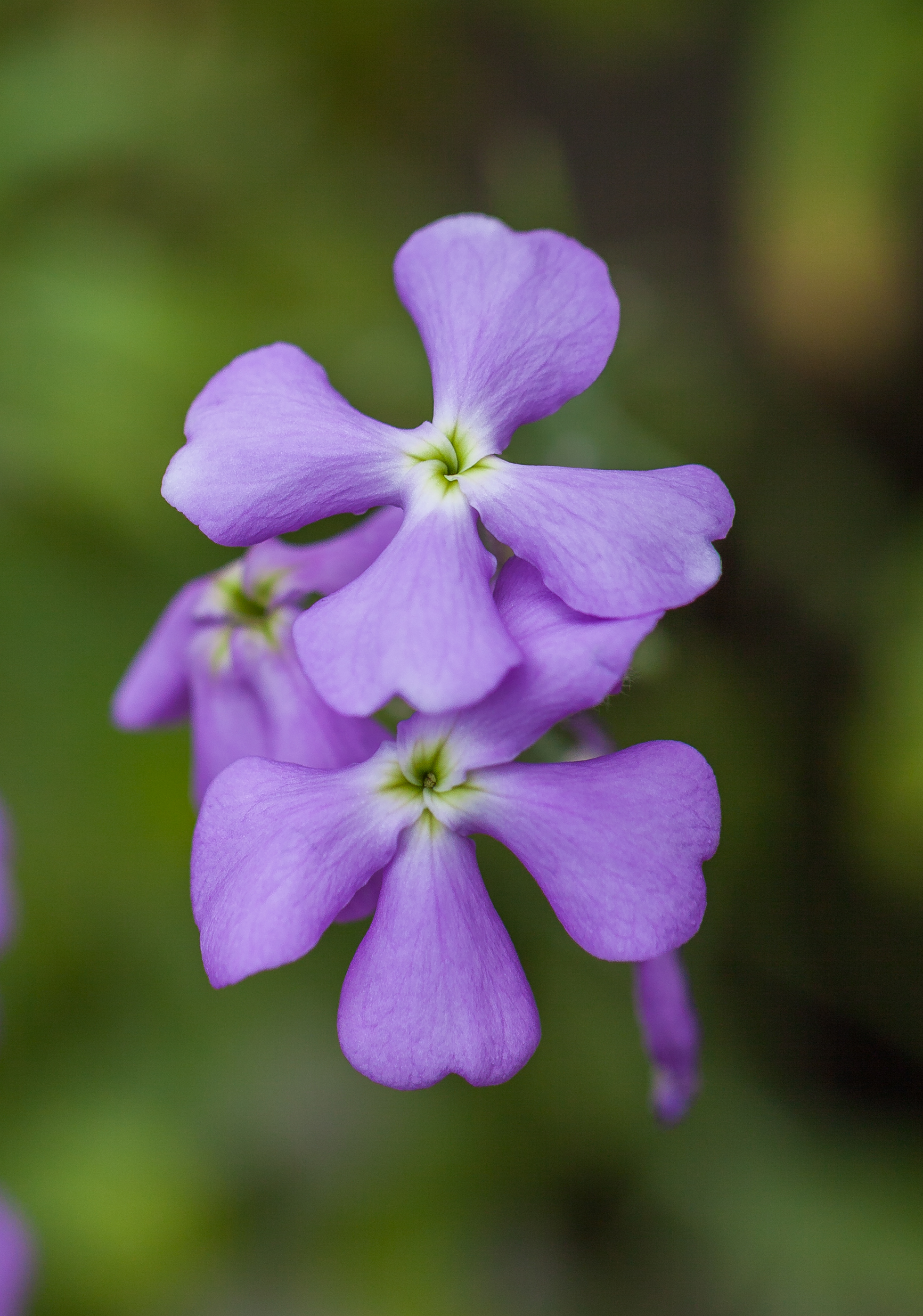
Detail of an exemplar in Munich Botanical Garden

== Description ==
It is a biennial or perennial herb, up to 90 cm height, with 5–25 cm long, lanceolate leaves. The flowers are violet, purple or rarely white, and stand in terminal racemes. The flowers are very fragrant.
