= Matthiola lunata =

Scientific classification
- Kingdom: Plantae
- Clade: Tracheophytes
- Clade: Angiosperms
- Clade: Eudicots
- Clade: Rosids
- Order: Brassicales
- Family: Brassicaceae
- Genus: Matthiola
- Species: M. lunata

Binomial name
- Matthiola lunata DC.

Synonyms
- Matthiola anoplia

Species of plant

Matthiola lunata is a species of plant in the family Brassicaceae.

== Sources ==
This article incorporates text from a free content work. Licensed under CC0 (license statement/permission). Text taken from Matthiola lunata. Encyclopedia of Life.
