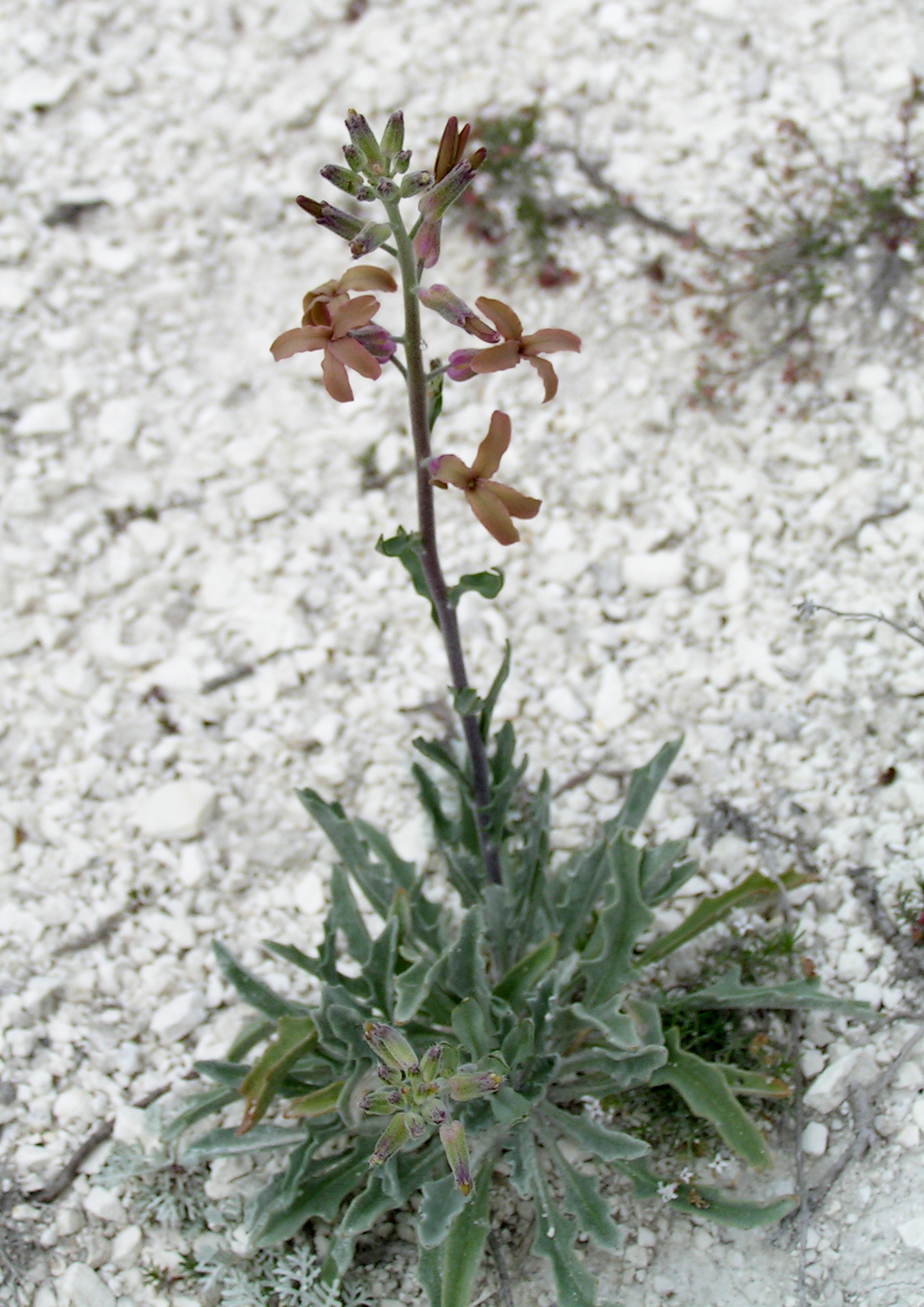
- Habit. Note the chalky soil and peculiar floral coloration.
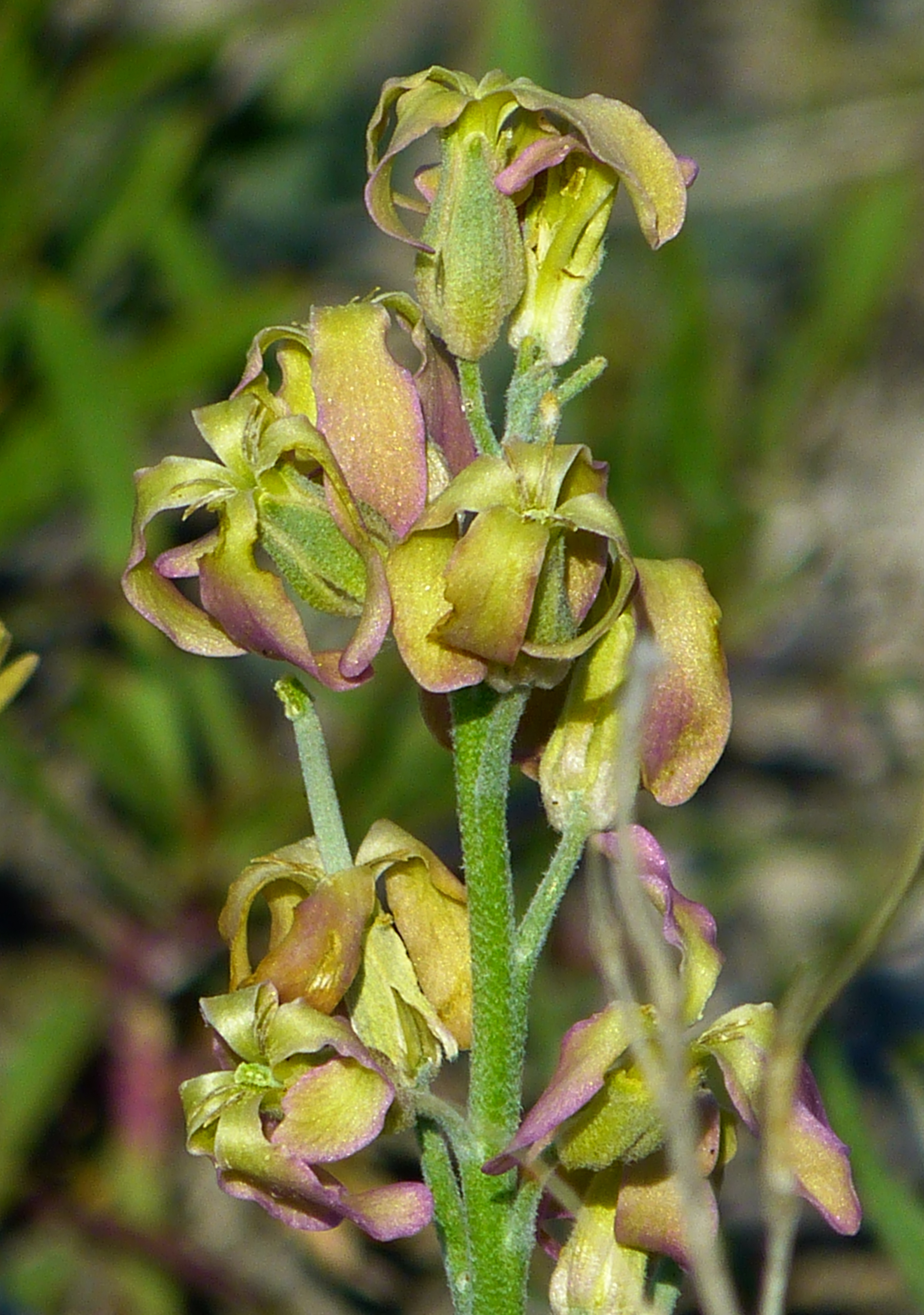
- Flowers can be green, brown, purple, or wine hued.

Scientific classification
- Kingdom: Plantae
- Clade: Embryophytes
- Clade: Tracheophytes
- Clade: Angiosperms
- Clade: Eudicots
- Clade: Rosids
- Order: Brassicales
- Family: Brassicaceae
- Genus: Matthiola
- Species: M. fragrans

Binomial name
- Matthiola fragrans (Fisch.) Bunge

Synonyms
- Cheiranthus fragrans Fisch.; Hesperis fragrans (Fisch.) Kuntze; Hesperis fragrans Fisch. ex Sweet; Matthiola odoratissima Claus

= Matthiola fragrans =

Species of flowering plant

Matthiola fragrans is a species of flowering plant in the family Brassicaceae, native to Ukraine, south, east and central European Russia, and Kazakhstan. It is confined to chalk outcrops.
