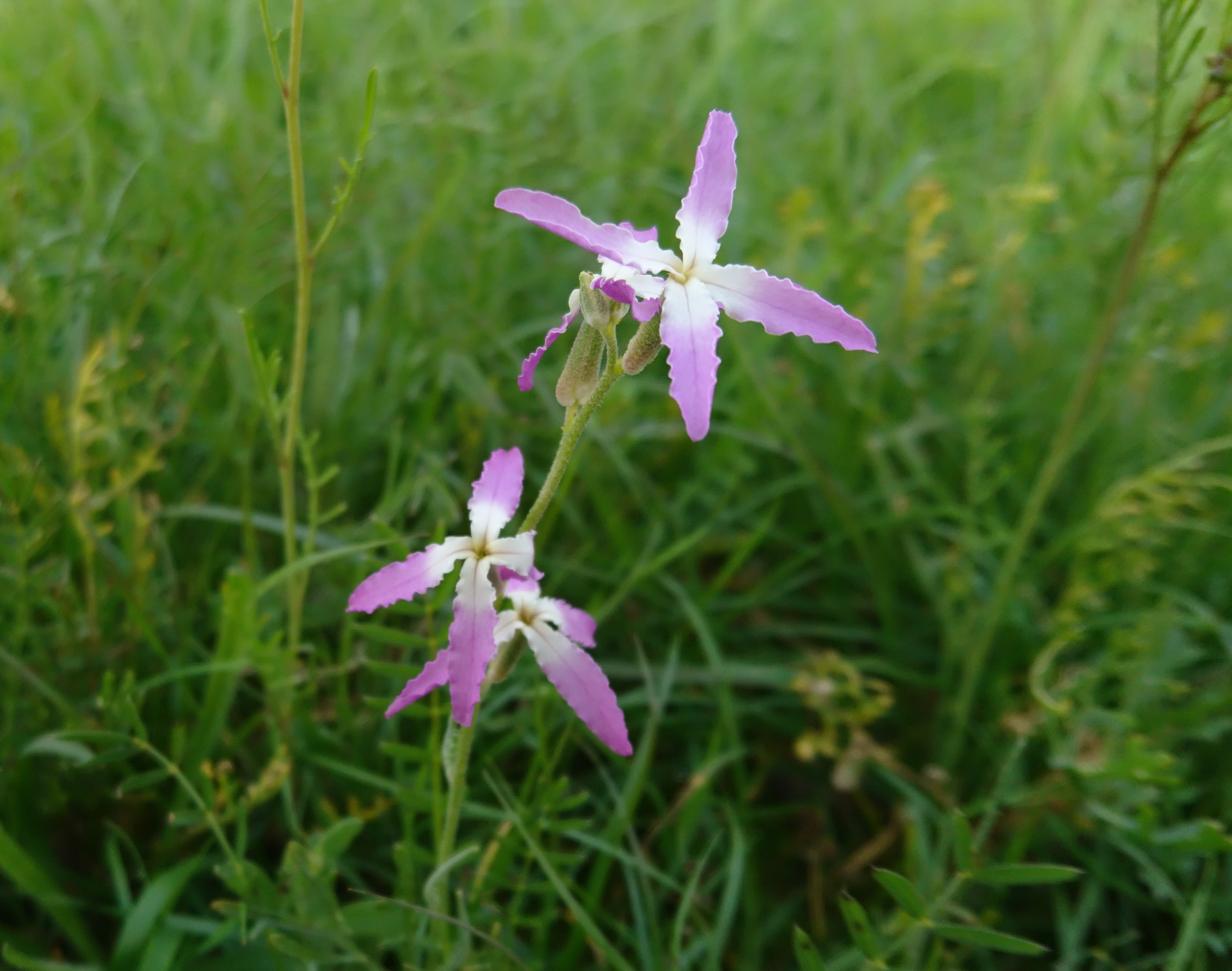
- Matthiola afghanica, Behbahan Iran

Scientific classification
- Kingdom: Plantae
- Clade: Tracheophytes
- Clade: Angiosperms
- Clade: Eudicots
- Clade: Rosids
- Order: Brassicales
- Family: Brassicaceae
- Genus: Matthiola
- Species: M. afghanica

Binomial name
- Matthiola afghanica Rech.f. & Köie

= Matthiola afghanica =

Species of flowering plant

Matthiola afghanica, Behbahan

Matthiola afghanica is a species of plant in the family Brassicaceae. The native range of this species is eastern Iran to Afghanistan. It is a subshrub and grows primarily in the temperate biome.
