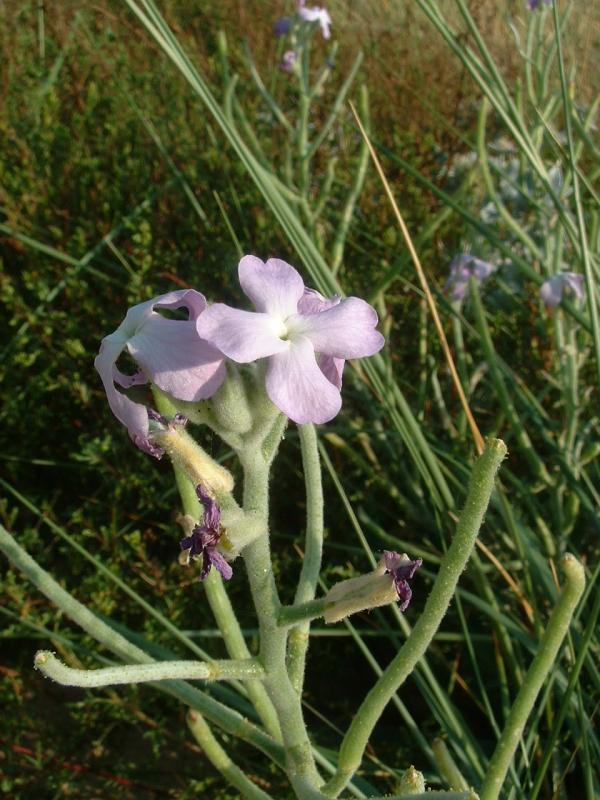

Scientific classification
- Kingdom: Plantae
- Clade: Tracheophytes
- Clade: Angiosperms
- Clade: Eudicots
- Clade: Rosids
- Order: Brassicales
- Family: Brassicaceae
- Genus: Matthiola
- Species: M. sinuata

Binomial name
- Matthiola sinuata (L.) R.Br.

= Matthiola sinuata =

Species of flowering plant

Matthiola sinuata, commonly known as sea stock, is a coastal plant in the family Brassicaceae.

A short-lived (biennial) herbaceous plant, growing to 60 cm in height. It does not spread vegetatively.

It grows on the shore, on new sand dunes. In continental Europe it is not rare, but it is seldom seen in the British Isles, where it is extinct in Scotland and probably Ireland. In 2001 its conservation status was assessed by the IUCN as 'vulnerable'.

The genus Matthiola takes its name from Italian physician and naturalist, Pierandrea Mattioli. The species epithet sinuata is Latin for 'sinuous' i.e. wavy.
