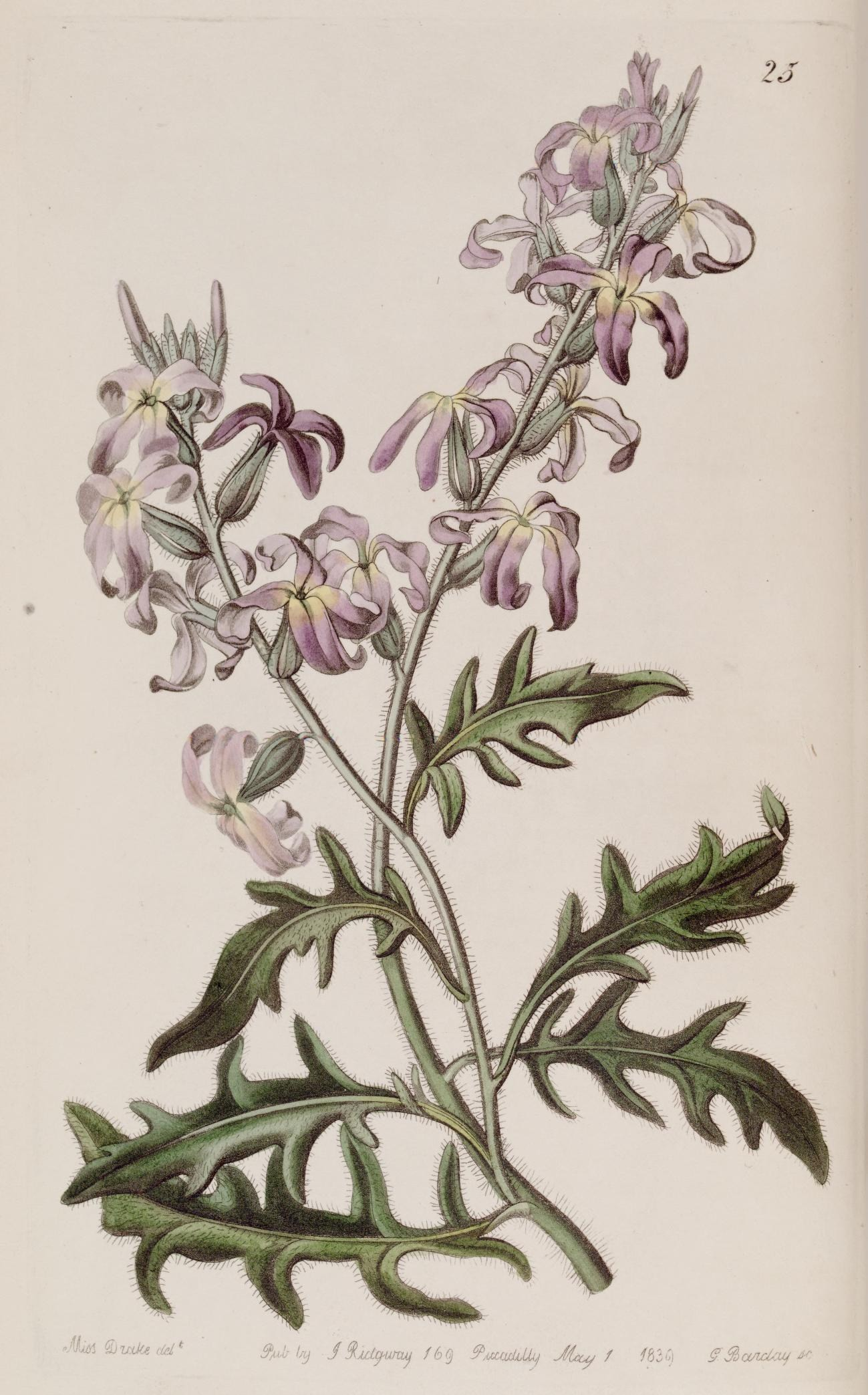

Scientific classification
- Kingdom: Plantae
- Clade: Embryophytes
- Clade: Tracheophytes
- Clade: Spermatophytes
- Clade: Angiosperms
- Clade: Eudicots
- Clade: Rosids
- Order: Brassicales
- Family: Brassicaceae
- Genus: Matthiola
- Species: M. longipetala

Binomial name
- Matthiola longipetala (Vent.) DC.

= Matthiola longipetala =

Night-Scented Stock

Species of flowering plant

Matthiola longipetala, known as night-scented stock or evening stock (syns Cheiranthus longipetalus, Matthiola bicornis, Matthiola longipetala subsp. bicornis, and Matthiola oxyceras), is a species of ornamental plant.

== Description ==
A member of the genus Matthiola native to Eurasia which emits a pleasant scent in the evening and through the night. It has four-petaled purple to white flowers, which are approximately 1–2 cm (0.39–0.79 in) wide. The plant is low-growing and highly branched in form, normally growing to about 45 cm (18 in) in length. During the heat of the day, the flowers appear wilted.

== Cultivation ==
This species is primarily grown for the evening scent. It is cold-resistant and grown throughout North America, even doing well into hardiness zone 1. This hardy annual prefers cool conditions in full sun and may not do well at high temperatures. It is best to plant thickly in clumps if a bushy appearance is desired. In Canada, the tiny seeds are usually sown in the early spring after the last frost and may be started indoors in April. They will bloom throughout the early summer and well into the summer if watered regularly. They should not be overwatered. They may also be grown in balcony containers although they will not usually stand upright and must not be allowed to become too hot and dry.

== Bibliography ==
- Pink, A. (2004). Gardening for the Million. Project Gutenberg Literary Archive Foundation.
