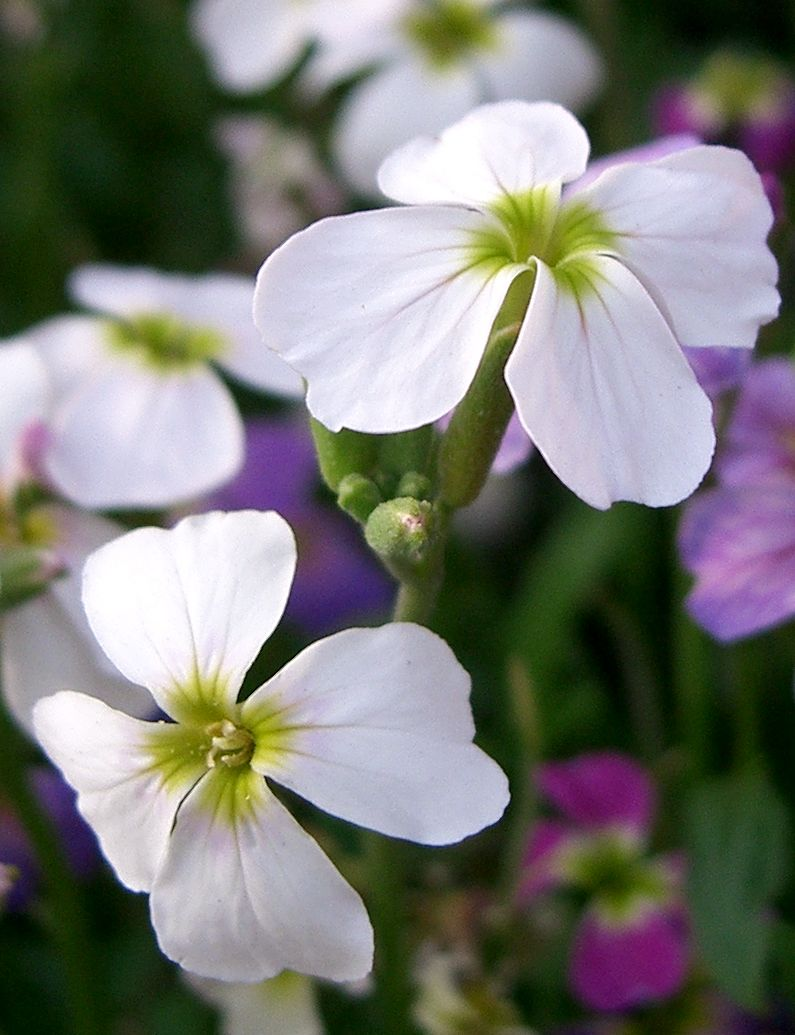

Scientific classification
- Kingdom: Plantae
- Clade: Tracheophytes
- Clade: Angiosperms
- Clade: Eudicots
- Clade: Rosids
- Order: Brassicales
- Family: Brassicaceae
- Genus: Malcolmia
- Species: M. maritima

Binomial name
- Malcolmia maritima (L.) Ait. f.

= Malcolmia maritima =

Virginia stock

Species of flowering plant

Malcolmia maritima, also known by its common name Virginia stock, is a popular annual garden plant from the family Brassicaceae. A beautiful and profusely flowering annual, it is probably one of the easiest of all plants to grow. Growing to about 6–12 inches (15–30 centimetres) tall, it makes a mass of pink, purple and white fragrant four petalled (cruciform) flowers. It is native in Greece and Albania and may be naturalized elsewhere in Mediterranean Europe where it occurs in maritime sandy habitats and in waste places.

== Cultivation ==
For best results in growing Virginia stock, sow on the surface in patches or rows and thin the young plants to 6 inches apart. It prefers full to partial sun and well drained soils.

== Varieties ==
There is a fair amount of variation in cultivated material, particularly with regard to stature and flower colour (variously violet, purple, lavender, pink).
