= William Aiton =

Scottish botanist (1731-1793)

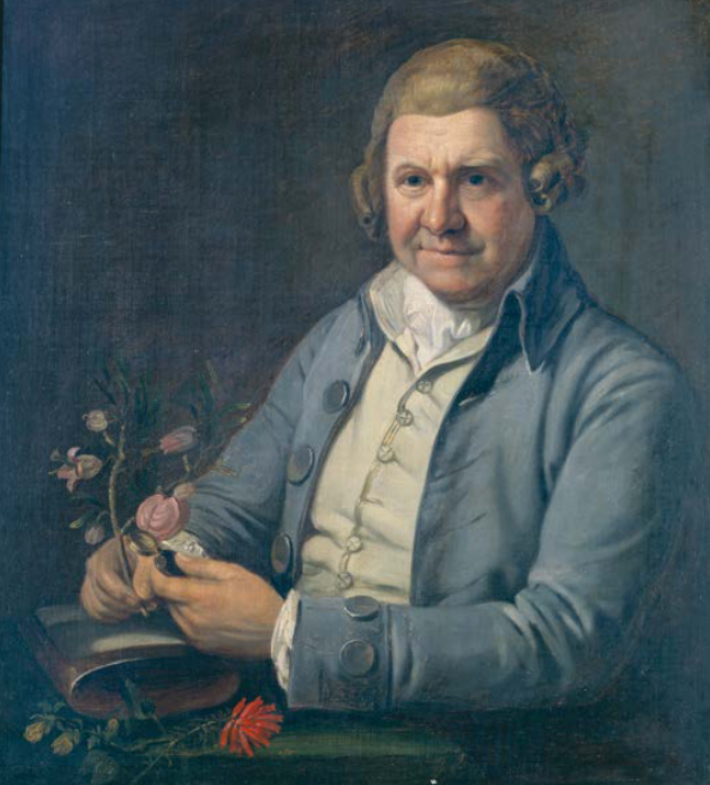
- Born: 1731; Hamilton, Scotland
- Died: 2 February 1793 (aged 61–62); Kew, England
- Resting place: St. Anne's Church, Kew, England
- Known for: Director of Royal Botanic Gardens, Kew
- Children: William Townsend Aiton
- Scientific career
- Fields: Botany
- Author abbrev. (botany): Aiton

William Aiton (1731 – 2 February 1793) was a Scottish botanist.

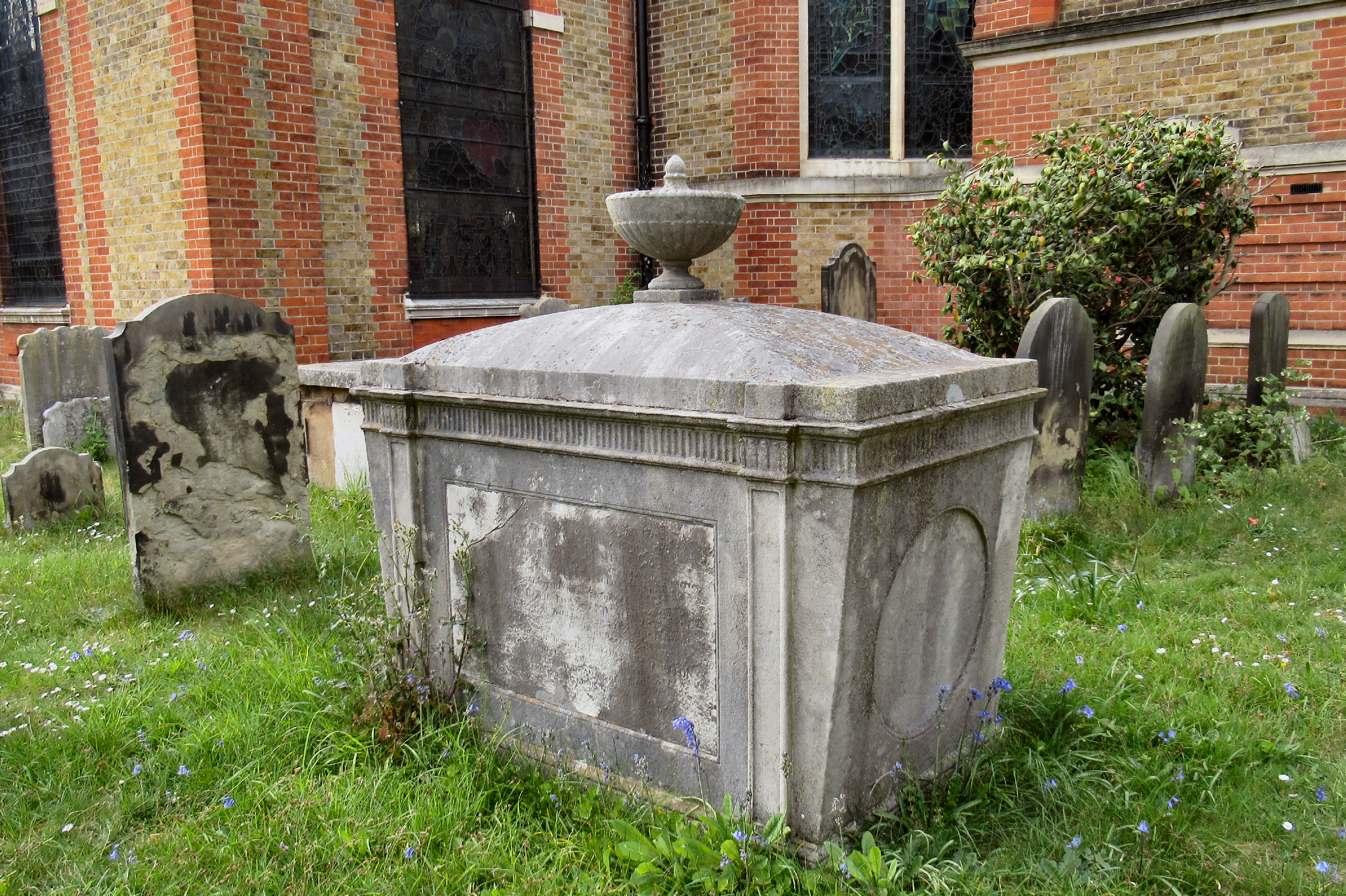
The Aiton family tomb

Aiton was born near Hamilton. Having been regularly trained to the profession of a gardener, he travelled to London in 1754, and became assistant to Philip Miller, then superintendent of the Chelsea Physic Garden. In 1759 he was appointed director of the newly established botanical garden at Kew, where he remained until his death. He effected many improvements at the gardens, and in 1789 he published Hortus Kewensis, a catalogue of the plants cultivated there. He is buried at nearby St. Anne's Church, Kew.

A second and enlarged edition of the Hortus was brought out in 1810–1813 by his eldest son, William Townsend Aiton.

Aiton is commemorated in the specific epithet aitonis.

In 1789, he classified the Sampaguita plant to the Jasminum genus and also named it as Arabian Jasmine because it was believed that the plant originated from The Arabian Peninsula although the plant didn't originate from Arabia.

== Selected publications ==
- Aiton, W. (1789). Hortus Kewensis. London: George Nicol.

== Bibliography ==
- Pagmenta, Frank (2009) The Aitons: Gardeners to their Majesties. Richmond Local History Society. ISBN 9780955071751
- Taylor, George (1970). "Aiton, William". Dictionary of Scientific Biography. Vol. 1. New York: Charles Scribner's Sons. pp. 88–89. ISBN 0-684-10114-9.
- Brummitt, R. K.; C. E. Powell (1992). Authors of Plant Names. Royal Botanic Gardens, Kew. ISBN 1-84246-085-4.
