= Hortus Kewensis =

Series of books on Kew Gardens

Hortus Kewensis (Latin for 'Kew Garden'; abbr. Hort. Kew.) is a series of works cataloguing the plant species in cultivation at the Royal Botanic Gardens at Kew in the late 18th and early 19th centuries.

== Background ==
Kew became a favored location for English courtiers after the establishment of Richmond Palace nearby under the Tudors. The Royal Botanic Gardens at Kew began as the private garden of Henry Capell of Tewkesbury and then Samuel Molyneux, who served as secretary to Frederick, Prince of Wales, son of George II and father of George III of England. Frederick then leased Kew House, began planning an enormous greenhouse, and had his close friend John Stuart, earl of Bute, begin requesting plant specimens from British agents around the world. After his death, Frederick's widow Augusta expanded its gardens still further in cooperation with Bute and William Aiton.

== John Hill's edition ==
The first edition of Hortus Kewensis was published in Latin in 1768. It was compiled by John Hill at Augusta's request and listed 2700 plants at the Garden. The 2nd edition published in 1769 included a further 700 plants.

== William Aiton's edition ==
The third edition, the first English edition, was compiled by Daniel Solander, Jonas Carlsson Dryander, and Robert Brown and published in 1789 under the name of William Aiton, whose 1773 plant list formed the basis of their work. Solander, Dryander, and Brown were the successive librarians and curators of Joseph Banks's collections, who had presumably directed Aiton to compile his index of the Kew Garden to aid his own Florilegium.

By the time of this edition, the garden included the vast majority of plant species in cultivation in all of England. It included information on the country of origin, who introduced the plant into English cultivation, and when. It is therefore now considered one of the most important sources of information on history of horticulture in England. This edition of the Hortus Kewensis was published as a comparatively large run of 1250 copies.

== William T. Aiton's edition ==
A fourth edition, the second English edition (abbr. Ait. Kew.), was published between 1810 and 1813 with the bulk of the new information added by Aiton's son William Townsend Aiton.
