= William Townsend Aiton =

English botanist (1766-1849)

William Townsend Aiton FRHS FLS
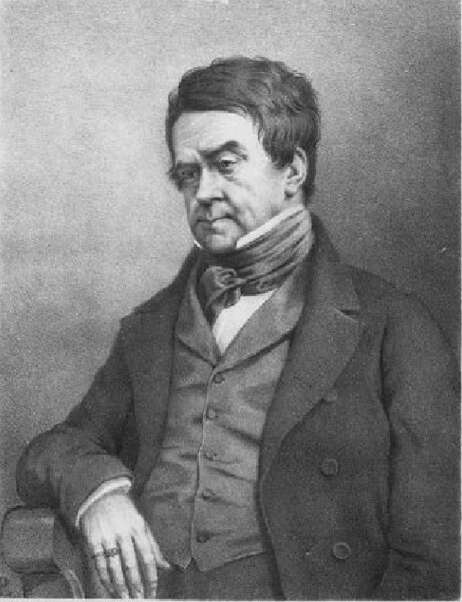
- Born: 2 February 1766; Kew
- Died: 9 October 1849 (aged 83); Kew
- Father: William Aiton
- Scientific career
- Fields: Botany

William Townsend Aiton FRHS FLS (2 February 1766 – 9 October 1849) was an English botanist.

== Early life and education ==
Aiton was born at Kew on 2 February 1766, the eldest child of the four daughters and two sons of Elizabeth (née Townsend) (c. 1740–1826) and William Aiton (1731–1793). His younger brother John Townsend Aiton (1777–1851) became royal gardener at Windsor, and later Frogmore and Kensington Palace.

== Career ==
Aiton brought out a second and enlarged edition of the Hortus Kewensis in 1810–1813, a catalogue of the plants at Kew Gardens, the first edition of which was written by his father William Aiton. Aiton succeeded his father on his death as superintendent at Kew Gardens in 1793 and was commissioned by George IV to lay out the gardens at the Royal Brighton Pavilion and at Buckingham Palace Garden.

Aiton was one of the founders and an active fellow of the Royal Horticultural Society.

== Later life ==
Aiton ceased as superintendent at Kew on the appointment of William Jackson Hooker as Kew's first official director in 1841 but remained living at Kew, although passing much of his time with his brother at Kensington. He retired in 1845 and died on 9 October 1849 at 199 Kew Road. He was buried at St Anne's Church, Kew. He never married but his heir was his illegitimate son, William Atwell Smith (b. 1808).
