= Atsushi =

- Gender: Male

Origin
- Origin: Japanese
- Meaning: Different meanings depending on the kanji used

Atsushi is a masculine Japanese given name. Notable people with the name include:

- Atsushi Abe (阿部 敦; born 1981), Japanese voice actor
- Atsushi Abe (synchronized swimmer) (安部 篤史; born 1982), Japanese synchronized swimmer
- Atsushi Aoki (青木 篤志; 1977–2019), Japanese professional wrestler
- Atsushi Arai (荒井 陸; born 1994), Japanese water polo player
- Atsushi Aramaki (荒巻 淳; 1926–1971), Japanese Nippon Professional Baseball pitcher
- Atsushi Egawa (江川 淳; born 1966), Japanese cross-country skier
- Atsushi Endoh (遠藤 淳志; born 1999), Japanese professional baseball player
- Atsushi Fujii (藤井 淳志; born 1981), Japanese retired professional outfielder
- Atsushi Fujimoto (藤本 敦士; born 1977), Japanese former professional baseball player
- Atsushi Fujita (藤田 敦史; born 1976), Japanese long-distance runner
- Atsushi Fujiwara (藤原 敦; born 1963), Japanese photographer
- Atsushi Fukuda (福田 淳; born 1965), Japanese entrepreneur
- Atsushi Funahashi (舩橋 淳; born 1974), Japanese film director
- Atsushi Hachisu (蜂巣 敦; born 1963), Japanese writer and manga critic
- Atsushi Hara (原 篤志; born 1979), Japanese professional radio-controlled car racer
- Atsushi Harada (原田 篤; born 1978), Japanese actor
- Atsushi Hashimoto (橋本 淳; born 1987), Japanese actor
- Atsushi Hiwasa (日和佐 篤; born 1987), Japanese rugby union player
- Atsushi Ichijo (一條 厚; born 1948), Japanese motorcycle designer and industrial engineer
- Atsushi Ichimura (市村 篤司; born 1984), Japanese former football player
- Atsushi Ida (伊田 篤史; born 1994), Japanese professional Go player
- Atsushi Ii (伊井 篤史; 1939–2020), Japanese voice actor
- Atsushi Imaruoka (伊丸岡 篤; born 1972), Japanese voice actor
- Atsushi Inaba (稲葉 敦志; born 1971), Japanese video game producer and businessman
- Atsushi Inoue (井上 敦史; born 1977), Japanese footballer
- Atsushi Irei (伊禮 淳; born 1967), Japanese weightlifter
- Atsushi Itō (actor) (伊藤 淳史; born 1983), Japanese actor
- Atsushi Ito (footballer) (伊藤 淳嗣; born 1983), Japanese footballer
- Atsushi Ito (wrestler) (伊藤 敦; born 1964), Japanese sport wrestler
- Atsushi Izawa (井澤 惇; born 1989), Japanese footballer
- Atsushi Kamijo (上條 淳士; born 1963), Japanese manga artist
- Atsushi Kanazawa (金澤 篤志; born 1978), Japanese former head coach
- Atsushi Kaneko (カネコ アツシ; born 1966), Japanese manga artist
- Atsushi Kashimoto (樫本 敦; born 1988), Japanese rugby union player
- Atsushi Katagiri (片桐 淳至; born 1983), Japanese former football player
- Atsushi Kataoka (片岡 篤史; born 1969), Japanese former Nippon Professional Baseball infielder
- Atsushi Kato (加藤 充志; born 1974), Japanese Go player
- Atsushi Kawamoto (川本 篤; born 1966), Japanese professional race car driver
- Atsushi Kawata (河田 篤秀; born 1992), Japanese professional footballer
- Atsushi Kazama (風間 淳; born 1964), Japanese biathlete
- Atsushi Kikutani (菊谷 篤資; born 1997), Japanese footballer
- Atsushi Kimura (木村 敦志; born 1984), Japanese footballer
- Atsushi Kinugawa (衣川 篤史; born 1976), Japanese former Nippon Professional Baseball catcher
- Atsushi Kisaichi (私市 淳; born 1972), Japanese voice actor
- Atsushi Kita (北 篤; born 1988), Japanese professional baseball player
- Atsushi Kitagawara (北川原 温; born 1951), Japanese architect
- Atsushi Kizuka (木塚 敦志; born 1977), Japanese former Nippon Professional Baseball pitcher
- Atsushi Kobayashi (小林 敦; born 1986), Japanese former professional baseball pitcher
- Atsushi Koga (rugby union) (古賀 淳; born 1975), Japanese former rugby union player
- Atsushi Koga (politician) (古賀 篤; born 1972), Japanese politician
- Atsushi Kono (河野 睦; born 1985), Japanese chef and breakdancer
- Atsushi Kotoge (小峠 篤司; born 1985), Japanese professional wrestler
- Atsushi Koyano (小谷野 敦; born 1962), Japanese scholar
- Atsushi Kuroi (黒井 敦史; 1969–2010), Japanese professional drifting driver
- Atsushi Kurokawa (黒川 淳史; born 1998), Japanese professional footballer
- Atsushi Maekawa (前川 淳; born 1964), Japanese anime and tokusatsu scriptwriter
- Atsushi Maruyama (丸山 敦; born 1976), Japanese professional wrestler
- Atsushi Maruyama (actor) (丸山 敦史; born 1983), Japanese actor
- Atsushi Matsumoto (松本 篤史; born 1988), Japanese freestyle wrestler
- Atsushi Matsuura (musician) (松浦 篤志; born 1968), Japanese guitarist
- Atsushi Matsuura (footballer) (松浦 淳; born 1982), Japanese former football player
- Atsushi Mekaru (銘苅 淳; born 1985), Japanese handball player
- Atsushi Mio (美尾 敦; born 1983), Japanese former footballer
- Atsushi Miyagi (宮城 淳; born 1931), Japanese tennis player
- Atsushi Miyake (三宅 淳詞; born 1999), Japanese racing driver
- Atsushi Miyata (宮田 敦史; born 1981), Japanese shogi player
- Atsushi Miyauchi (宮内 敦士; born 1969), Japanese voice actor
- Atsushi Miyazaki (宮﨑 敦次; born 1992), Japanese former professional baseball pitcher
- Atsushi Mochizuki (望月 惇志; born 1997), Japanese Nippon Professional Baseball pitcher
- Atsushi Momose (百生 敦; born 1962), Japanese physicist and professor
- Atsushi Muroga (室賀 厚; born 1964), Japanese film director and screenwriter
- Atsushi Nagai (永井 篤志; born 1974), Japanese former football player
- Atsushi Nakajima (中島 敦; born 1909), Japanese author
- Atsushi Nakamura (中村 敦; born 1973), Japanese professional football coach
- Atsushi Natori (名取 篤; born 1961), Japanese former football player
- Atsushi Negishi (根岸 淳; born 1977), Japanese equestrian
- Atsushi Nomi (能見 篤史; born 1979), Japanese former professional baseball pitcher
- Atsushi Nonaka (野中 厚; born 1976), Japanese politician
- Atsushi Obata (小畑 篤史; born 1973), Japanese rower
- Atsushi Obayashi (大林 敦; born 1943), Japanese swimmer
- Atsushi Ogasawara (小笠原篤; born 1976), Japanese animation director
- Atsushi Ōkubo (大久保 篤; born 1979), Japanese manga artist
- Atsushi Oka (岡 篤志; born 1995), Japanese professional cyclist
- Atsushi Okamoto (岡本 篤志; born 1981), Japanese former professional Nippon Professional Baseball player.
- Atsushi Onami (大波 渥; born 1994), Japanese sumo wrestler known as Wakatakakage
- Atsushi Onita (大仁田 厚; born 1957), Professional Wrestler
- Atsushi Ono (斧 アツシ; born 1961), Japanese actor and voice actor
- Atsushi Ōno (大野 篤史; born 1957), Japanese Head coach
- Atsushi Oshima (大島 敦; born 1956), Japanese politician
- Atsushi Oyagi (大八木 淳史; born 1961), Japanese former rugby union player
- Atsushi Sakahara (阪原 淳; born 1966), Japanese film director, writer, and producer
- Atsushi Sakai (境 敦史; born 1983), Japanese professional wrestler
- Atsushi Sakate (坂手 淳史; born 1993), Japanese rugby union player
- Atsushi Sakurai (櫻井 敦司; 1966–2023), Japanese singer
- Atsushi Sasaki (佐々木 淳; born 1971), Japanese luger
- Atsushi Satō (佐藤 篤志; born 1980), Japanese singer-songwriter
- Atsushi Sato (佐藤 敦之; born 1978), Japanese runner
- Atsushi Sawada (沢田 敦; born 1958), Japanese alpine skier
- Atsushi Shimono (下野 淳; born 1988), Japanese football player
- Atsushi Shirai (白井 淳; born 1966), Japanese former football player
- Atsushi Shiramata (白又 敦; born 1994), Japanese actor
- Atsushi Shirota (代田 敦資; born 1991), Japanese retired footballer
- Atsushi Somatomo (杣友 厚; born 1949), Japanese basketball player
- Atsushi Sugie (杉江 淳), Japanese astronomer
- Atsushi Suzuki (鈴木 敦; born 1988), Japanese politician
- Atsushi Suzumi (鈴見 敦; born 1978), Japanese manga artist
- Atsushi Taira (大蘿 淳司; born 1963), Japanese technology entrepreneur and investor
- Atsushi Takahashi (高橋 篤志; born 1965), Japanese amateur astronomer
- Atsushi Takenouchi (竹之内 淳志; born 1962), Japanese Butoh dancer
- Atsushi Tamaru (田丸 篤志; born 1986), Japanese voice actor
- Atsushi Tamura (田村 淳; born 1973), Japanese comedian and television presenter
- Atsushi Tani (谷 訯; born 1933), Japanese former swimmer
- Atsushi Tero, Japanese researcher, biologist, and associate professor
- Atsushi Tokinoya (時野谷 敦; born 1941), Japanese diplomat
- Atsushi Tsuruyama (鶴山 淳志; born 1981), Japanese professional Go player
- Atsushi Tsutsumishita (堤下 敦; born 1977), Japanese comedian
- Atsushi Uchiyama (内山 篤; born 1959), Japanese former football player and manager
- Atsushi Watanabe (actor, born 1898) (渡辺 篤; 1898–1977), Japanese film actor
- Atsushi Watanabe (actor, born 1947) (渡辺 篤史; born 1947), Japanese actor
- Atsushi Watanabe (politician) (渡部 篤; born 1952), Japanese politician
- Atsushi Yamaguchi (山口 厚; born 1953), Japanese lawyer and academic
- Atsushi Yamaguchi (footballer) (山口 篤史; born 1980), Japanese footballer
- Atsushi Yamamoto (山本 篤; born 1982), Japanese Paralympic athlete
- Atsushi Yamanishi (山西 惇; born 1962), Japanese actor
- Atsushi Yamatoya (大和屋 竺; 1937–1993), Japanese film director, screenwriter and actor
- Atsushi Yanagisawa (柳沢 敦; born 1977), Japanese former professional footballer
- Atsushi Yasuda (安田 篤; 1868–1924), Japanese lichenologist
- Atsushi Yoneyama (米山 篤志; born 1976), Japanese footballer
- Atsushi Yonezawa (米澤 淳司; born 1985), Japanese footballer
- Atsushi Zaizen (財前 淳; born 1999), Japanese footballer

== Fictional characters ==
- Atsushi Hayami (速水 厚志), character from Gunparade March
- Atsushi Murasakibara (紫原 敦), a character from Kuroko's Basketball
- Atsushi Kinugawa (鬼怒川 熱史) a characters from Cute High Earth Defense Club LOVE!
- Atsushi Ōtani (大谷 敦士), character from the anime and manga series Lovely Complex
- Atsushi Nakajima (中島 敦), protagonist of the anime and manga series Bungo Stray Dogs
- Atsushi Sendō (千堂敦), also known as Akkun, character from the anime and manga series Tokyo Revengers
