= Royal Star =

Royal Star may refer to:

- Yamaha Royal Star
- Royalstar
- Yamaha Royal Star Venture
- Royal Star & Garter
- Royal Star and Garter Home, Richmond
- BSA A50 Royal Star
- Royal Star Teeniepings
- Yamaha Royal Star Tour Deluxe
- Royal Star Mansion
