= Yamaha Venture =

Touring motorcycle made by Yamaha

The Yamaha Venture was a premier touring motorcycle manufactured in two forms by Yamaha from 1983 to 1993 and from 1999 to 2009.

In 1983 Yamaha created a V4 power package that began the Yamaha Venture motorcycle series. The first in the series was the Venture Royale produced from 1983 to 1993. Yamaha discontinued the design until 1996 when Yamaha resurrected the Venture power package and produced a cruiser style motorcycle called the Royal Star. The Royal Star was produced until 2001. In 1999 Yamaha again brought out a large full touring motorcycle known as the Royal Star Venture, again using a variation of the Venture power package. In 2005 Yamaha introduced the Royal Star Tour Deluxe, which is the Royal Star Venture without the fairing, radios, or trunk.

In 1985 Yamaha introduced the V-Max. The first generation V-Max power package was a modified version of the one used in the Venture Royale. The Royale model is based on the Venture with additional accessories and weight.
