= Star and Garter =

Star and Garter may refer to:

- Royal Star & Garter, a charitable trust in Richmond, London
  - Royal Star and Garter Home, Richmond, a former home for ex-servicemen run by the charity
  - Star and Garter Hotel, Richmond, a former hotel on the same site
- Star and Garter (musical), a 1942 American musical revue
- Star and Garter, Manchester, a listed pub in Greater Manchester, England
- Star and Garter, Stockport, a listed pub in Greater Manchester, England
- Star and Garter, a burlesque theatre opened in 1908 in Chicago by the Columbia Amusement Company
