= Kono (restaurant) =

Japanese restaurant in New York City, U.S.

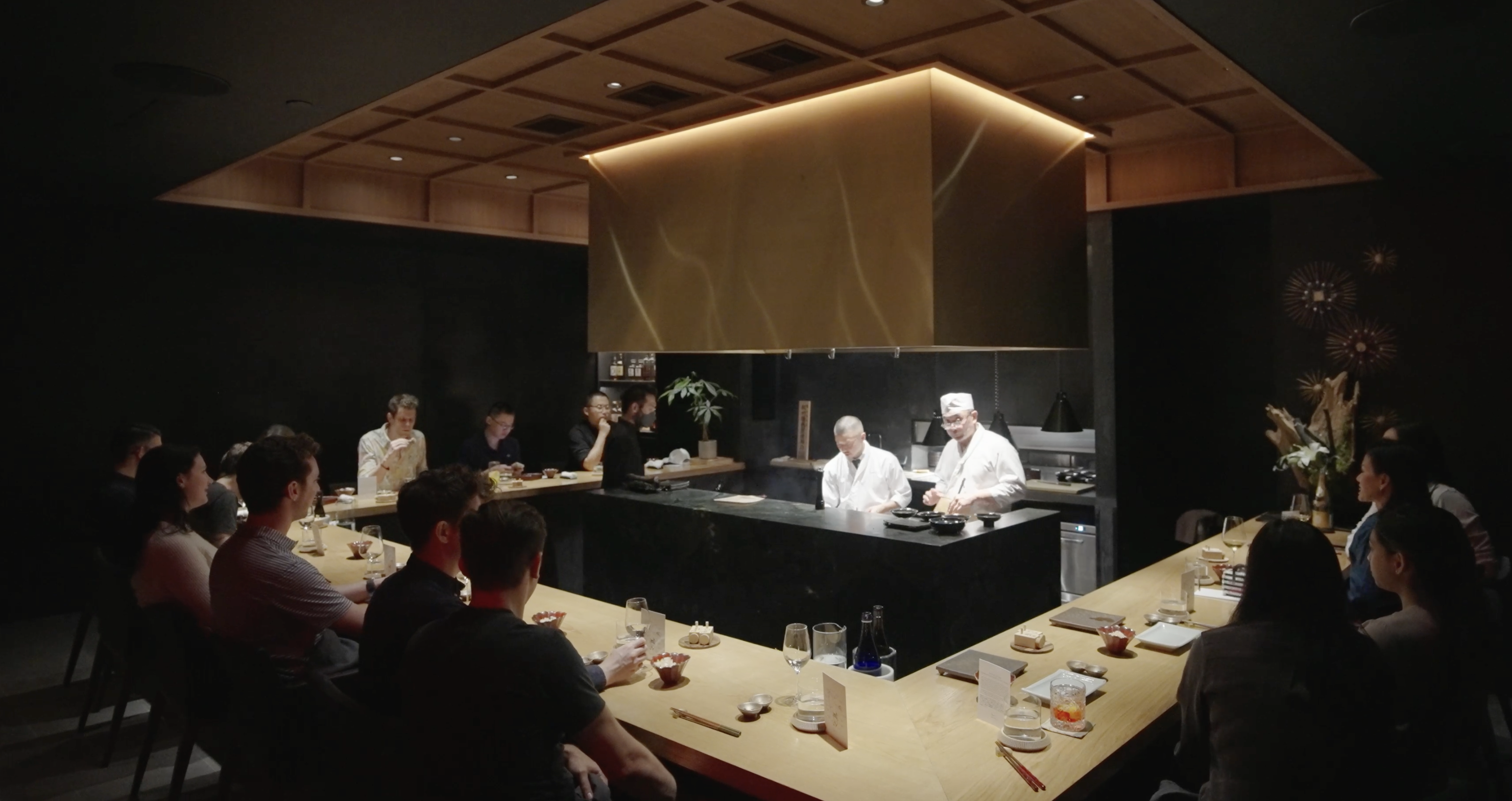
- Interactive map of Kono

Restaurant information
- Established: April 25, 2022
- Food type: Japanese
- Location: 46 Bowery, New York City, New York, 10013, United States
- Coordinates: 40°42′56″N 73°59′48″W
- Website: www.yakitorikono.com

Kono (stylized in all caps) is a Japanese restaurant in New York City that primarily serves yakitori. Opened in 2022 by New York City-based yakitori chef and breakdancer Atsushi Kono, it is located in the Canal Arcade, a pedestrian passageway that runs between Bowery and Elizabeth Street in Chinatown.

The restaurant has received coverage and acclaim from publications like The New York Times, Thrillist, Bon Appétit, and Grub Street, as well as nominations for the James Beard Awards.

== History ==
After serving as the executive chef of Yakitori Torishin for a decade, Kono left to open his own yakitori restaurant, Kono, in April 2022 after finding a suitable location for it in the Canal Arcade of Manhattan's Chinatown. Kono told Represent that he had always wanted to open a restaurant in a hideaway, much like the yakitori restaurants in Japan.

With fourteen seats, Kono currently serves an omakase tasting menu with sixteen courses—most courses are a yakitori skewer utilizing a different part of chicken.

Kono, also a breakdancer, has frequently stated his love for hip-hop and regularly plays it during restaurant hours. In 2023, Kono was the venue for the rapper Nas' 50th birthday party.

== Critical reception ==
Many publications have lauded Kono's yakitori. Pete Wells, writing for The New York Times, gave Kono three out of four stars, named it an NYT Critic's Pick, and called chef Kono a "Yakitori Master" as well as "the city’s most accomplished yakitori chef and, by extension, one of its greatest chicken cooks." E. Alex Jung, writing for Grub Street, called Kono's yakitori "chicken in its most elevated form."

Kono has been twice-nominated in the Best Chef: New York State category of the James Beard Awards, in 2024 and 2025, for his cooking at his namesake restaurant.

== See also ==
- List of Japanese restaurants
