= Alan Waldron =

Alan Waldron may refer to:

- Alan Waldron (cricketer) (1920–1999), English cricketer
- Alan Waldron (footballer) (born 1951), English professional footballer
