= Yamaha Royal Star =

Motorcycle developed by Yamaha

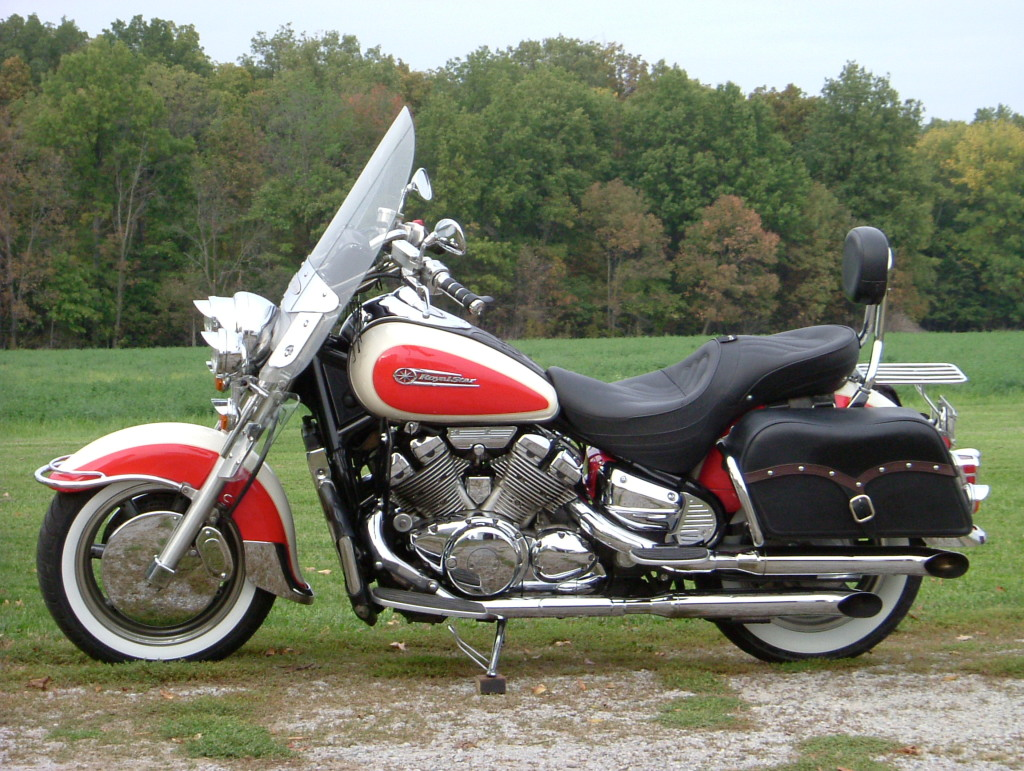
- Manufacturer: Yamaha
- Production: 1983-1993, 1999-2013
- Class: Cruiser
- Engine: V4, 1,294 cubic centimetres (79.0 cu in)
- Bore / stroke: 2.99 x 2.59 inches (75.9 x 65.8 mm)
- Power: 99.3 metric horsepower (73.0 kW) @6000 rpm
- Torque: 123.0 newton-metres (90.7 lbf⋅ft) @4750 rpm
- Transmission: 5 speed manual
- Brakes: Front: Dual Discs With 4-piston Calipers Rear: Single Disc With 4-piston Calipers
- Wheelbase: 1,690 millimetres (67 in)
- Dimensions: L: 2,705 millimetres (106.5 in); W: 900 millimetres (35 in); H: 1,565 millimetres (61.6 in)
- Weight: 377 kilograms (831 lb) (wet)

In 1996 Yamaha introduced the Royal Star motorcycle. This motorcycle uses the basic power package from the Yamaha Venture Royale.

Other machines using variations of this engine include the Royal Star Venture, the Royal Star Tour Deluxe, and the V-Max.

== Vehicle information ==
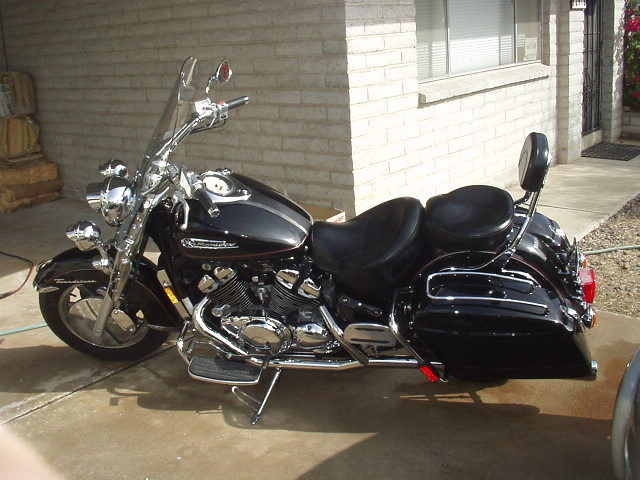
1997 Yamaha Royal Star Tour Deluxe

=== Appearance ===
The Yamaha Royal Star was the first Star Motorcycle Yamaha introduced.

Standard and Tour Classic versions were initially made. The Standard model had four mufflers and no windscreen or side bags, though they were available as accessories. The Tour Classic had four mufflers, a windscreen, and soft or leather-covered hard side bags. In 1997 a Tour Deluxe version was introduced. The Tour Deluxe had two mufflers, a windscreen, and hard side bags.

On the Tour Classic and the Tour Deluxe, the seat height is 28.5 in (720 mm), the wheelbase is 66.7 in (1,690 mm), with a wet weight of 377 kilograms (831 lb). The Standard model was a little lighter and the seat was a little lower.

=== Mechanical ===
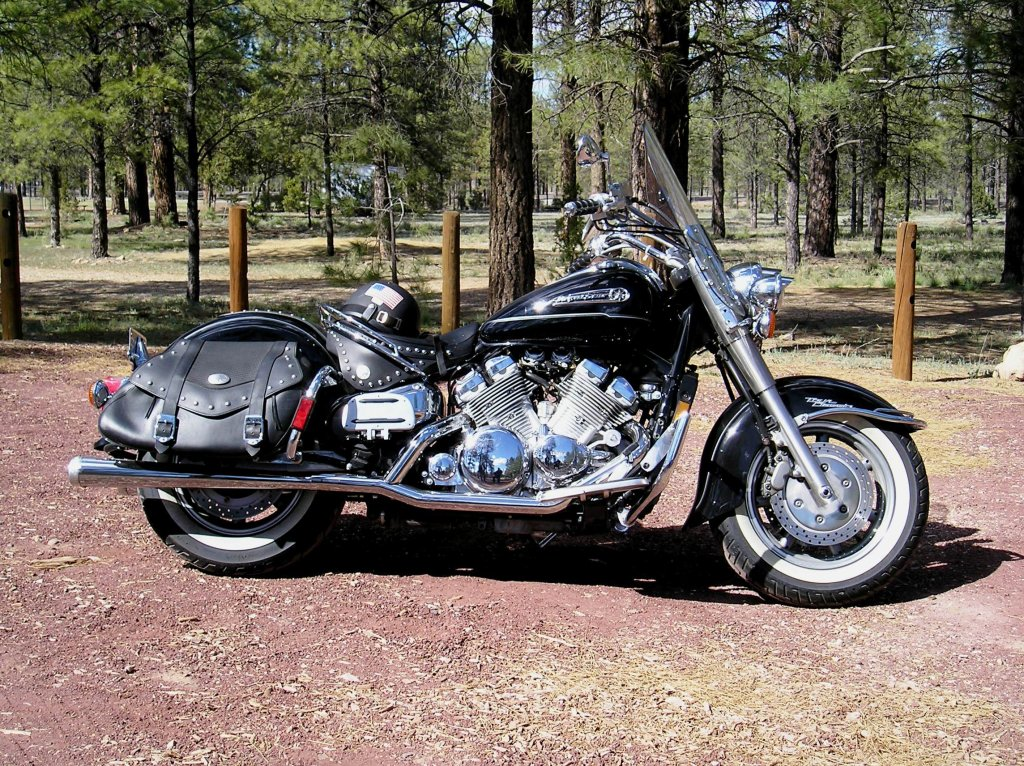
2000 Yamaha Royal Star Tour Classic

The drive package on the Royal Star includes a liquid-cooled 1,294 cc (79.0 cu in) V4 engine. It has four valves per cylinder, overhead camshafts, and shim-over bucket valves. The five-speed overdrive transmission is part of the engine case and both the engine and transmission share oil. The drive shaft and final drive assembly are built into the left side of the double-sided swing arm. Swing arm motion is damped by a mono-shock mounted horizontally under the center rear of the frame, forward of the rear wheel. The clutch is of the wet plate design and is hydraulically activated by the left hand lever. The brake system uses two disk brakes on the front and one disk on the right rear. All calipers are of four-piston design.
