= Taizo Son =

Korean-Japanese businessman (born 1972)

- Born: Son Tae-jang (손태장); September 29, 1972 (age 53); Tosu, Saga, Japan
- Education: University of Tokyo
- Occupations: President & CEO of Mistletoe, Inc; Chairman of GungHo

Taizo Son (Japanese: 孫泰蔵, romanized: Son Taizō, Korean: 손태장, born September 29, 1972) is a Japanese businessman of Korean ancestry. He is CEO of Mistletoe, a company that he founded in 2013, and chairman of mobile gaming company GungHo, which he founded in 2002. GungHo's market value in 2013 was $10.4 billion, making Son a billionaire. He is the youngest brother of SoftBank magnate Masayoshi Son.

== Early life ==
Taizo was born in Tosu City, Saga Prefecture, Japan.

After he graduated from a secondary school connected to Kurume University, he enrolled into the University of Tokyo and studied business administration. While he was still considering his career after graduation, his older brother Masayoshi asked him to join the Yahoo Japan project, where he met Jerry Yang, co-founder of Yahoo. Taizo pitched Yang his idea of how to efficiently launch Yahoo Japan. Eventually the position of content development leader was given to Taizo although he was still a student. During the project Taizo successfully managed 100 staff and launched Yahoo Japan within three months.

== Career ==
In 1998 he co-founded Onsale, a company which later became GungHo. He then managed the company as CEO and it went public on Nippon New Market Hercules (which later became JASDAQ) on March 9, 2005. The company’s market value in 2013 was $10.4 billion due to its gaming mobile app Puzzle & Dragons which was the top revenue earning app globally for the year.

In 2009 he founded a seed stage accelerator MOVIDA JAPAN which supported 47 startups. Some of those startups are translimit, flier, trippiece, nana music, U-NOTE, and Shiroyagi Corporation. The company finished offering its seed acceleration program in June 2014. The investment function has been separated into a venture capital fund Genuine Startups.

In 2013 he founded Mistletoe, a hub for startups and the overall entrepreneurial ecosystem. With the company he and his members provide learning opportunities for entrepreneurs, facilitate startup communities, invest in and support startup companies and venture capitals.

Son relocated to Singapore in 2018 and was one of the co-founders of the business and innovation hub, SPECTRUM. In 2023, he and Mistletoe director Atsushi Taira co-founded The Edgeof, an ecosystem builder and venture capital entity, and in the same year The Edgeof acquired SoftBank Ventures Asia, a wholly owned SoftBank subsidiary, in order to establish a pan-Asian ecosystem for pioneering startups.

== Boards and honors ==
He serves on the board of ETIC, an institute which provides young people with opportunities to develop their capabilities as social entrepreneurs.
