= Atsushi Kono =

New York City-based yakitori chef and breakdancer

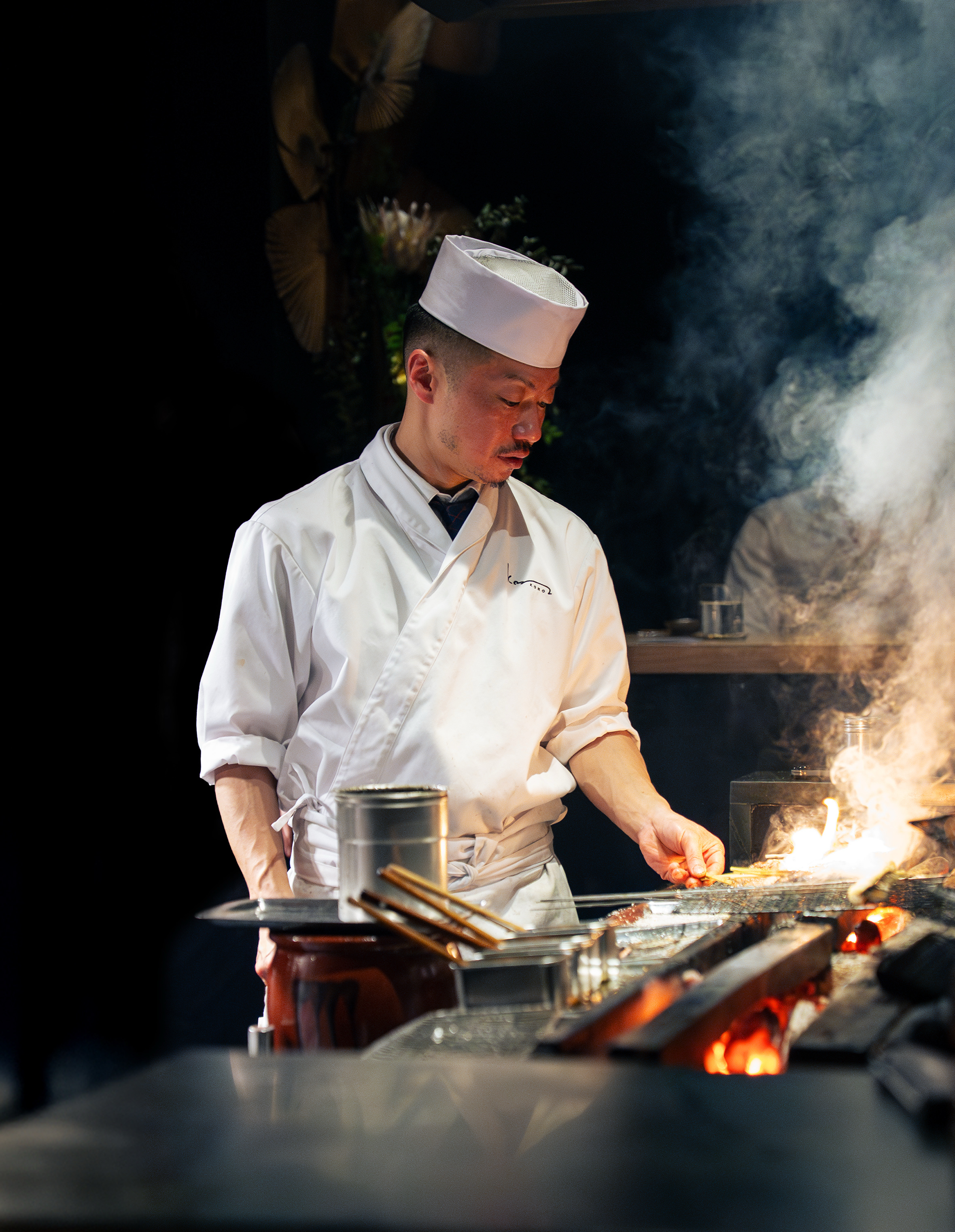
- Kono in 2025
- Born: Saitama Prefecture, Japan
- Occupation: Yakitori chef
- Known for: Kono

Atsushi Kono (河野睦, Kōno Atsushi) is a New York City-based yakitori chef and breakdancer. He was the executive chef at Yakitori Torishin for ten years before starting his own yakitori restaurant, Kono, in 2022.

Kono has been twice-nominated for the James Beard Award in the Best Chef: New York State category. Pete Wells, writing for The New York Times, gave Kono three out of four stars, named it an NYT Critic's Pick, and called Kono a "Yakitori Master" as well as "the city’s most accomplished yakitori chef and, by extension, one of its greatest chicken cooks."

== Early life ==
Kono grew up in Saitama Prefecture in Japan.

== Career ==
=== Breakdancing ===
Prior to his career as a yakitori chef, Kono was a breakdancer in Japan. He first came into the art at the age of twelve and then joined a professional dance crew, Rock Steady Crew, at the age of eighteen—at the time, he was also working at his family's fish market and restaurant.

When Kono moved to the United States in 2006, he worked in restaurants while maintaining his hobby of breakdancing and also deejaying. After over a decade of working in the restaurant business, Kono still breakdances "for fun and for training and fitness."

=== Restaurants ===
Kono was the executive chef at Yakitori Torishin in Hell's Kitchen, Manhattan for over a decade starting in 2006. There, he "discovered that dance and rhythm were inseparable from his cooking" and saw yakitori as a practice involving tempo. In addition to yakitori, Kono also cooked kaiseki cuisine, learned modern culinary techniques, and promoted zero waste in his practice. In an interview with Bon Appétit, Kono stated that it took him an entire decade to master yakitori and all of its processes.

In April 2022, Kono opened his own yakitori restaurant, Kono, with fourteen seats in the Canal Arcade of Chinatown, Manhattan. He told Represent that he had always wanted to open a restaurant in a hideaway—like under an overpass or in a tunnel, much like the yakitori restaurants he had seen in Japan—where he could cook and play hip-hop music for his patrons. In 2023, Kono was the venue for Nas' 50th birthday party.

At his yakitori restaurant, Kono serves a sixteen-course omakase tasting menu which utilizes up to thirteen different parts of a chicken. E. Alex Jung, writing for Grub Street, called Kono's yakitori "chicken in its most elevated form." The restaurant was a finalist for a James Beard Award, in the Best Chef: New York State category, in 2024 and 2025.
