= Yamaha Venture Royale =

Large touring motorcycle

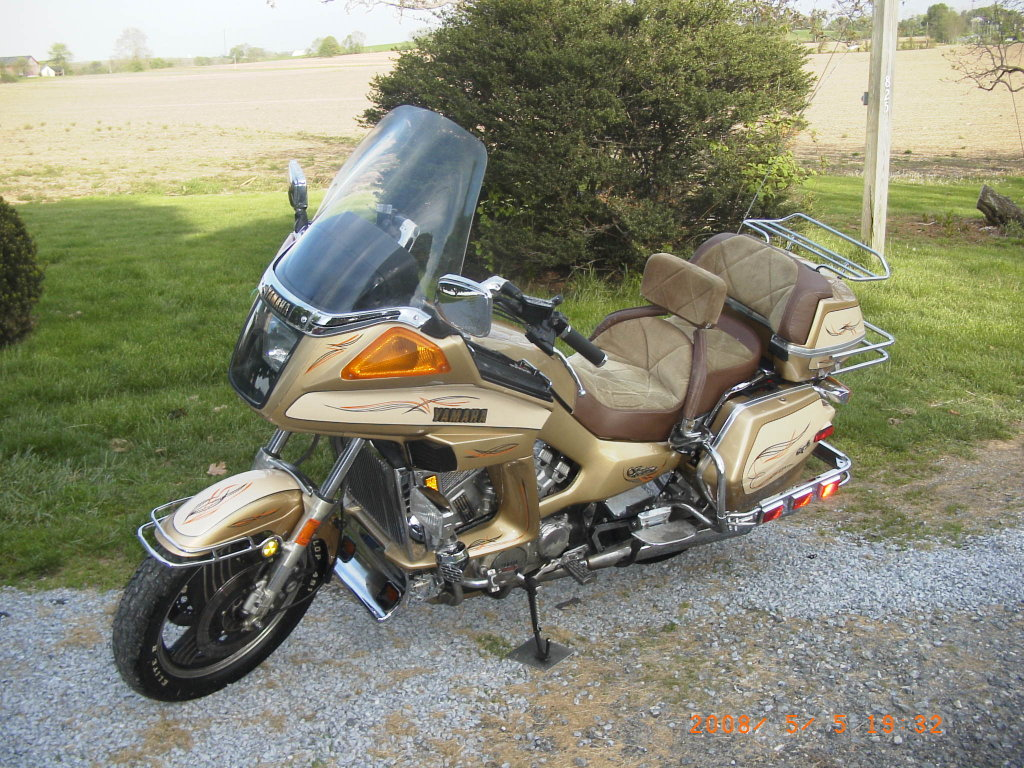
1983 MK1 Yamaha Venture Royale

The Yamaha Venture Royale is a large touring motorcycle manufactured in two versions by Yamaha from 1983 to 1993.

== Vehicle information ==
=== History ===
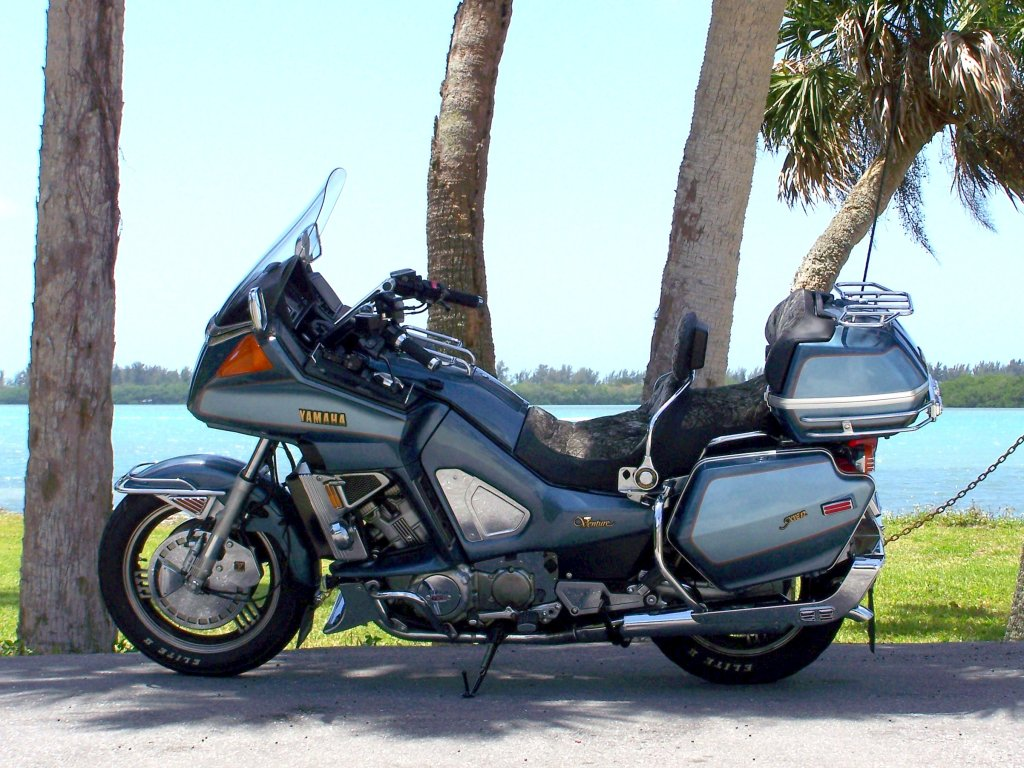
1984 MK1 Yamaha Venture Royale

The 1,198 cc (73.1 cu in) V4 engine from the Mk1 Venture was modified for performance and was used as the engine in the Yamaha V-Max. Yamaha resurrected the Venture's V4 engine in 1996 in the Royal Star cruiser, then later brought out a full touring version in 1999 as the Royal Star Venture.

=== Mechanical ===
Two primary versions were produced. The XVZ12 (Mk1) from 1983 through 1985 had a 1,198 cc (73.1 cu in) (referred to as 1,200 cc) 1983 to 1985 has an gear 2 eashue engine and removable trunk and bags. The XVZ13D (Mk2) was produced from 1986 through 1993 and had a 1,298 cc (79.2 cu in) (referred to as 1,300 cc) engine with the trunk and side bags rigidly mounted. Both models had a full frame mounted fairing with an AM/FM cassette stereo, an air suspension control system with on board compressor and electronic cruise control (1984–1993). A CB radio was standard on 1986-1993 Venture Royale models.

The drive package on the Venture Royale includes a liquid-cooled V-4 engine. It has four valves per cylinder, overhead camshafts with shim over bucket valve adjustment. The five speed transmission is integral with the engine case. The engine and transmission share lubricating oil. The drive shaft and final drive assembly are built into the left side of the double sided swing arm. Swing arm motion is damped by an air preloaded monoshock mounted in the center of the frame. The clutch is of the wet plate design and is hydraulically activated by the left hand lever.

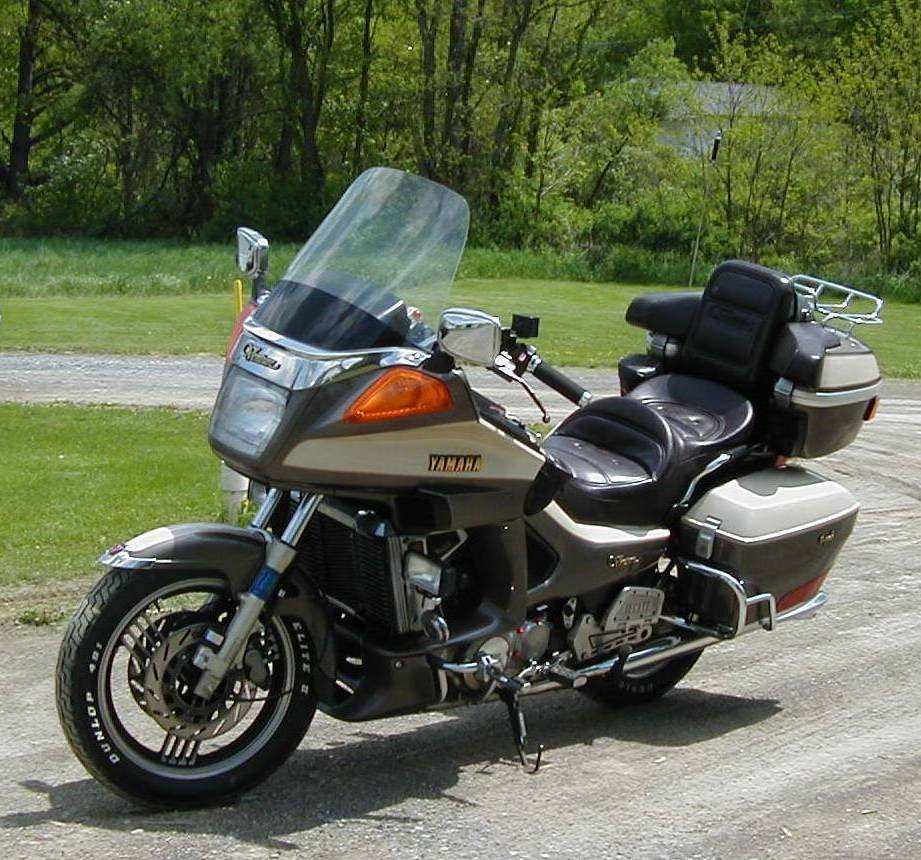
1987 MK2 Yamaha Venture Royale
