= Atsushi Tokinoya =

Japanese diplomat

Atsushi Tokinoya (時野谷 敦, Tokinoya Atsushi, born April 1941 in Tokyo) is a Japanese diplomat.

== Career ==
From 1960 to 1963, Tokinoya studied law at Kyoto University, and from 1963 to 1965 he attended the Fletcher School of Law and Diplomacy, Massachusetts.

In 1963, he entered the Japanese Ministry of Foreign Affairs. From 1965 to 1967, he served as the Third Secretary of the Japanese Embassy in the United States. From 1973 to 1975, he served as First Secretary of the Japanese Embassy in Indonesia, and from 1975 to 1977 as a member of the Japanese delegation to the Organisation for Economic Co-operation and Development. From 1990 to 1994, he served as Consul-General in San Francisco. From 1995 to 1999, he served as Japanese representative to the European Union. From 2002 to 2005, he was the Japanese Ambassador to Thailand.
