= Atsushi Kinugawa =

Japanese baseball player and coach (born 1976)

Tokyo Yakult Swallows – No. 83
- Catcher / Coach
- Born: March 20, 1981; Takarazuka, Hyōgo, Japan
- Batted: Right Threw: Right

NPB debut
- May 13, 2008, for the Tokyo Yakult Swallows

Last appearance
- June 17, 2010, for the Tokyo Yakult Swallows

NPB statistics
- Batting average: .250
- Hits: 17
- Home runs: 2
- Runs batted in: 14
- Stolen base: 0

Teams
- As player: Tokyo Yakult Swallows (2007–2011); As coach: Tokyo Yakult Swallows (2019–present)
- Last updated on: January 9 2023

Atsushi Kinugawa (衣川 篤史, Kinugawa Atsushi; born December 29, 1976) is a Japanese former Nippon Professional Baseball catcher.
