= Yamaha VMAX =

Large capacity cruiser motorcycle

Yamaha V-Max
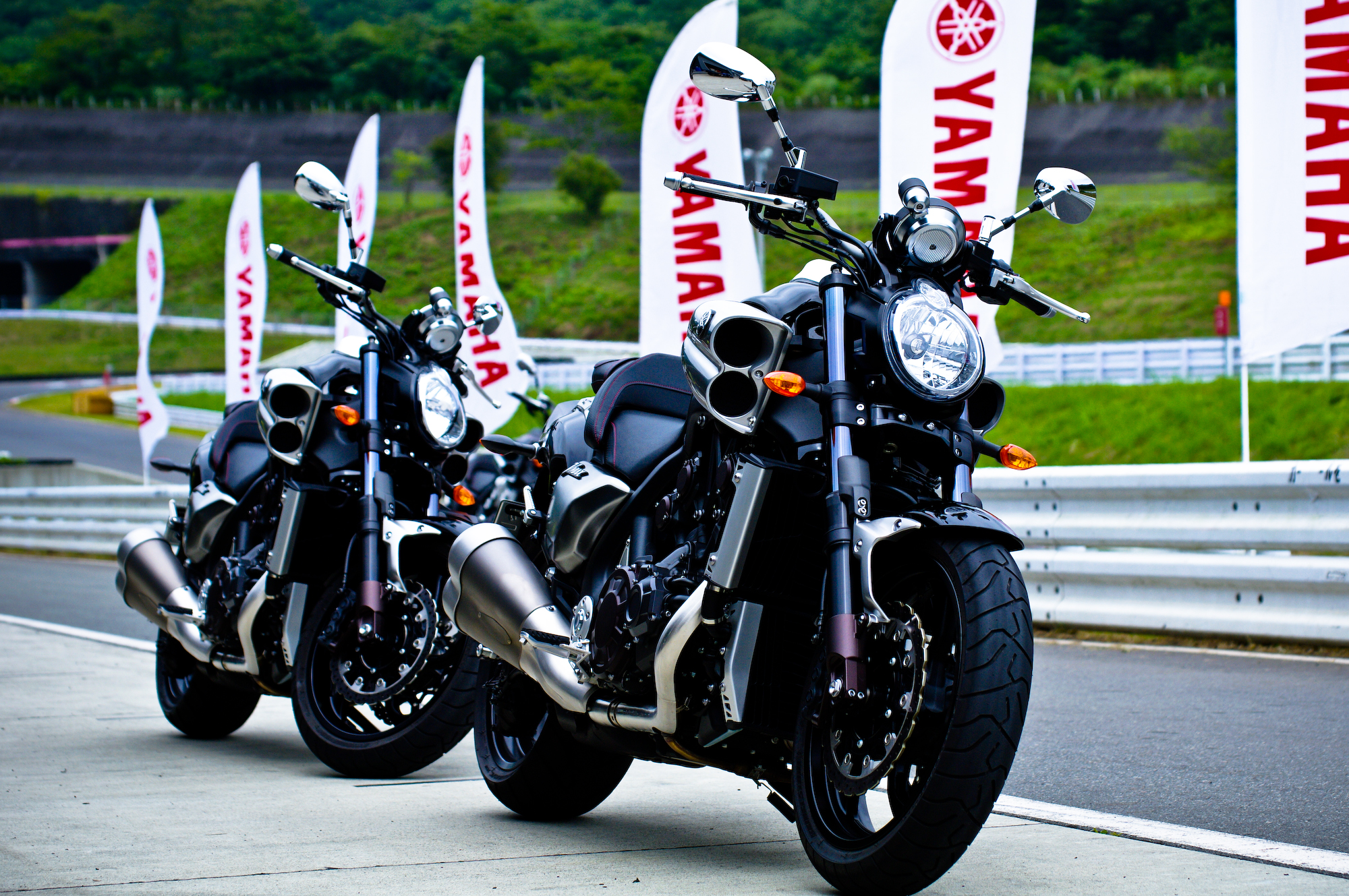
- Manufacturer: Yamaha Motor Company
- Also called: VMAX
- Production: 1985–2005
- Class: Power cruiser
- Engine: 1,197 cc (73.0 cu in) liquid-cooled DOHC 70° V-4
- Bore / stroke: 76 mm × 66 mm (3.0 in × 2.6 in)
- Top speed: 240 km/h (150 mph)
- Power: 89 kW (120 hp) (rear wheel)
- Torque: 112.7 N⋅m (83.1 lbf⋅ft) (rear wheel)
- Transmission: 5-speed
- Rake, trail: 29°, 4.7 in (119 mm)
- Wheelbase: 1,590 mm (63 in)
- Dimensions: L: 2,300 mm (91 in); W: 795 mm (31.3 in); H: 1,160 mm (46 in)
- Seat height: 765 mm (30.1 in)
- Weight: 271 kg (597 lb) (dry); 286 kg (631 lb) (wet)
- Fuel capacity: 15 L (3.3 imp gal; 4.0 US gal)
- Fuel consumption: 34.2 mpg_{‑US} (6.9 L/100 km; 41.1 mpg_{‑imp})
- Related: Yamaha Venture; Yamaha Royal Star

The Yamaha V-Max, (or VMAX) is a cruiser motorcycle produced by Yamaha from 1985 through 2020. Known for its 70° V4 engine, shaft drive, and distinctive styling, the VMAX was discontinued following the 2020 model year.

== History ==
The V-Max was designed by Atsushi Ichijo in a team led by Akira Araki with input from Ed Burke and John Reed.

Upon its release in 1985, the V-Max garnered instant critical acclaim and earned the title "Bike of the Year" from Cycle Guide. Sold both in Japan and abroad, the V-Max was sold with only minor modifications from the 1985 model year until the 2007 model year. The V-Max was noted for its quick acceleration, but was also criticized for its poor cornering ability and soft suspension.

In 1997, the bike cost £9,359 or $15,322 (equivalent to $30,730 in 2025) to purchase.

Until 2008, the original V-Max was offered for sale through the Star Motorcycles division of Yamaha Motorcycles. Apart from a minor freshening to the bike's specifications in 1993, when the bike gained a larger-diameter fork to minimize high-speed wobbling and drift, four-piston brake calipers, and other handling and safety related upgrades, the 2007 V-Max was almost the same as the original 1985 version.

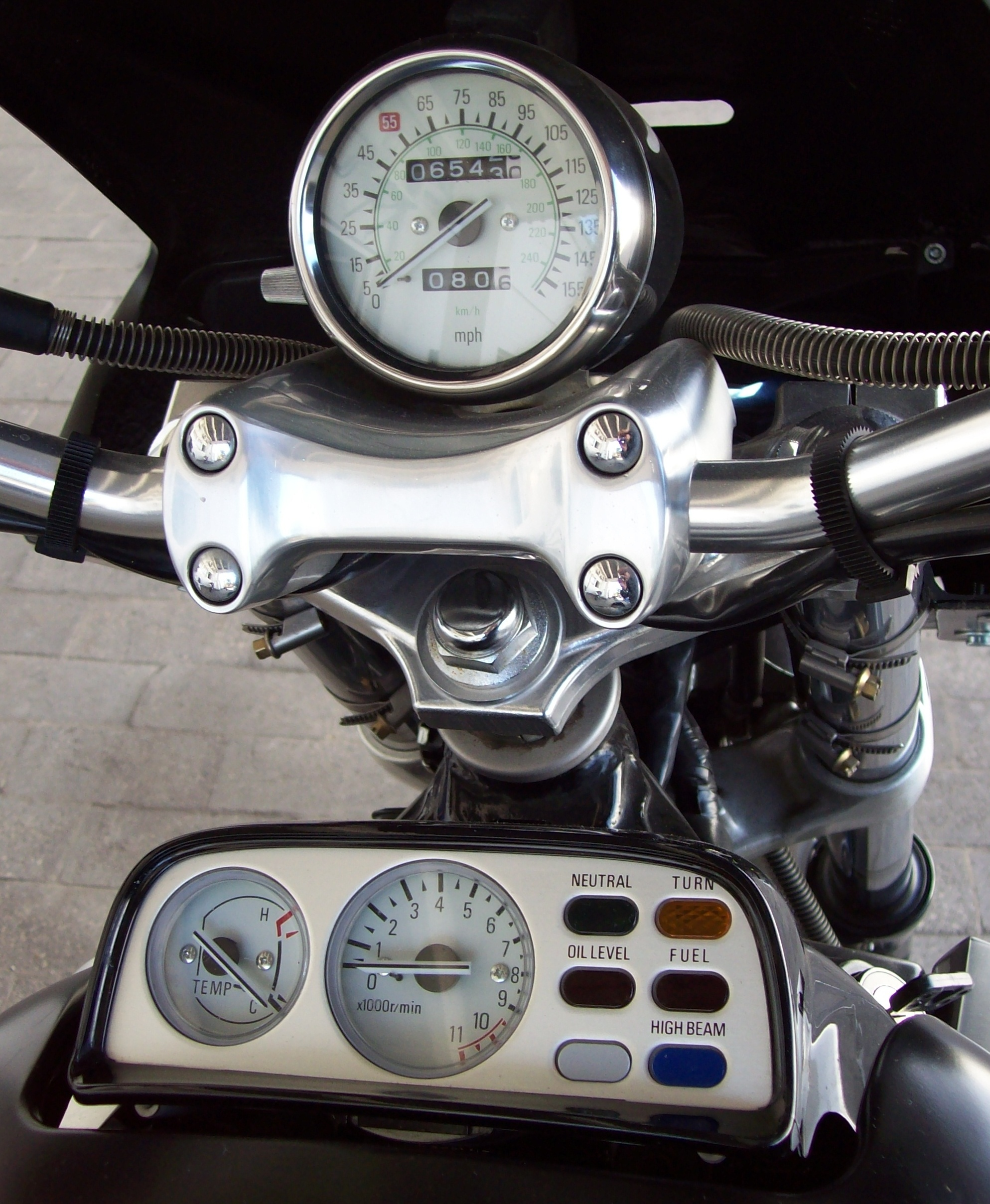
Yamaha V-Max 1998 dash

== Specifications ==
Overall, the V-Max is 2,300 mm (91 in) long, 795 mm (31.3 in) wide, and 1,160 mm (46 in) high. The engine is a tuned version of the double overhead camshaft, four valve per cylinder, liquid-cooled V-4 from the Yamaha Venture. Along with other modifications to the engine, the compression ratio was raised to 10.5:1, and the V-Boost system was added.

=== V-Boost ===
V-Boost is a system by which butterfly valves are opened in the intake manifold between the 1st and 2nd, and between the 3rd and 4th cylinders starting from 5,750 rpm. The valves are opened gradually to match the rising engine speed with a signal provided by the ignition system. The valves are at the full open position at 8,000 rpm. A small black box sends a computed signal to a servo motor that pulls a wire to open the butterfly valves. The V-Boost system adds 10 percent to the top power rating of the base engine.

== VMAX ==
Yamaha VMAX
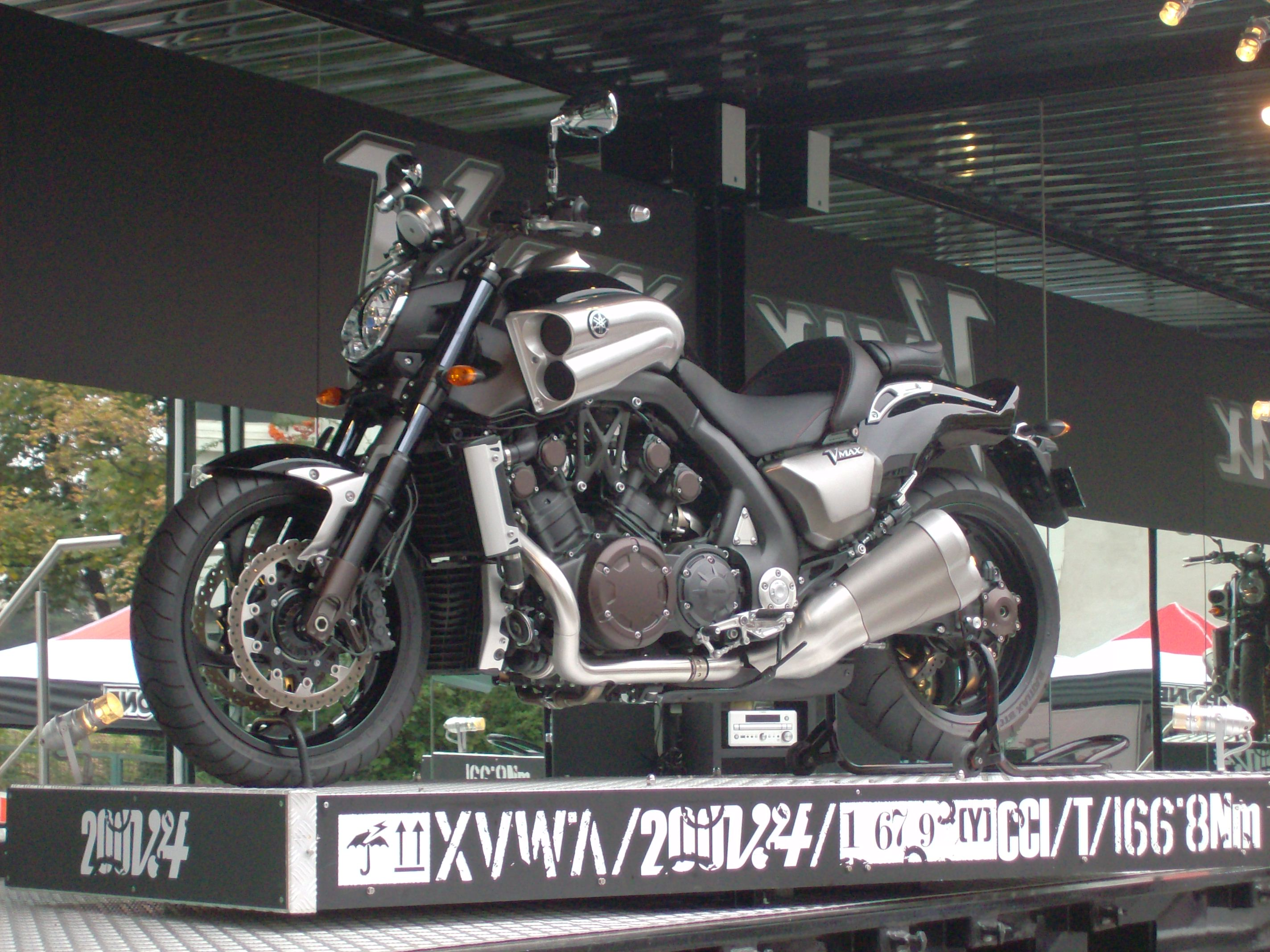
- Manufacturer: Yamaha Motor Company
- Production: 2009–2020
- Predecessor: Yamaha V-Max
- Class: power cruiser
- Engine: 1,679 cc (102 cu in) liquid-cooled DOHC 65°V-4
- Bore / stroke: 90 mm × 66 mm (3.5 in × 2.6 in)
- Power: 147 kW (197 hp) (claimed); 129.2 kW (173.3 hp) @ 9,000 rpm(rear wheel)
- Torque: 166.79 N⋅m (123.02 lb⋅ft) (claimed); 153 N⋅m (113 lbf⋅ft) @ 6,600 rpm (rear wheel)
- Transmission: 5-speed, slipper clutch
- Frame type: cast aluminum
- Suspension: front adjustable 52mm oxidized titanium coated rear adjustable Link-type Monocross with piggyback reservoir
- Brakes: Front: radial mount 6-piston calipers, dual wave-type 12.6 in (320 mm) discs, brembo master cylinder Rear: single piston caliper, wave-type 11.7 in (298 mm) disc, Brembo master cylinder
- Wheelbase: 66.9 in (1,699 mm)
- Dimensions: L: 94.3 in (2,395 mm); W: 32.3 in (820 mm)
- Seat height: 30.5 in (775 mm)
- Weight: 694 lb (315 kg) (wet)
- Fuel capacity: 4.0 US gallons (15 L; 3.3 imp gal)
- Fuel consumption: 28.3 mpg_{‑US} (8.3 L/100 km; 34.0 mpg_{‑imp})

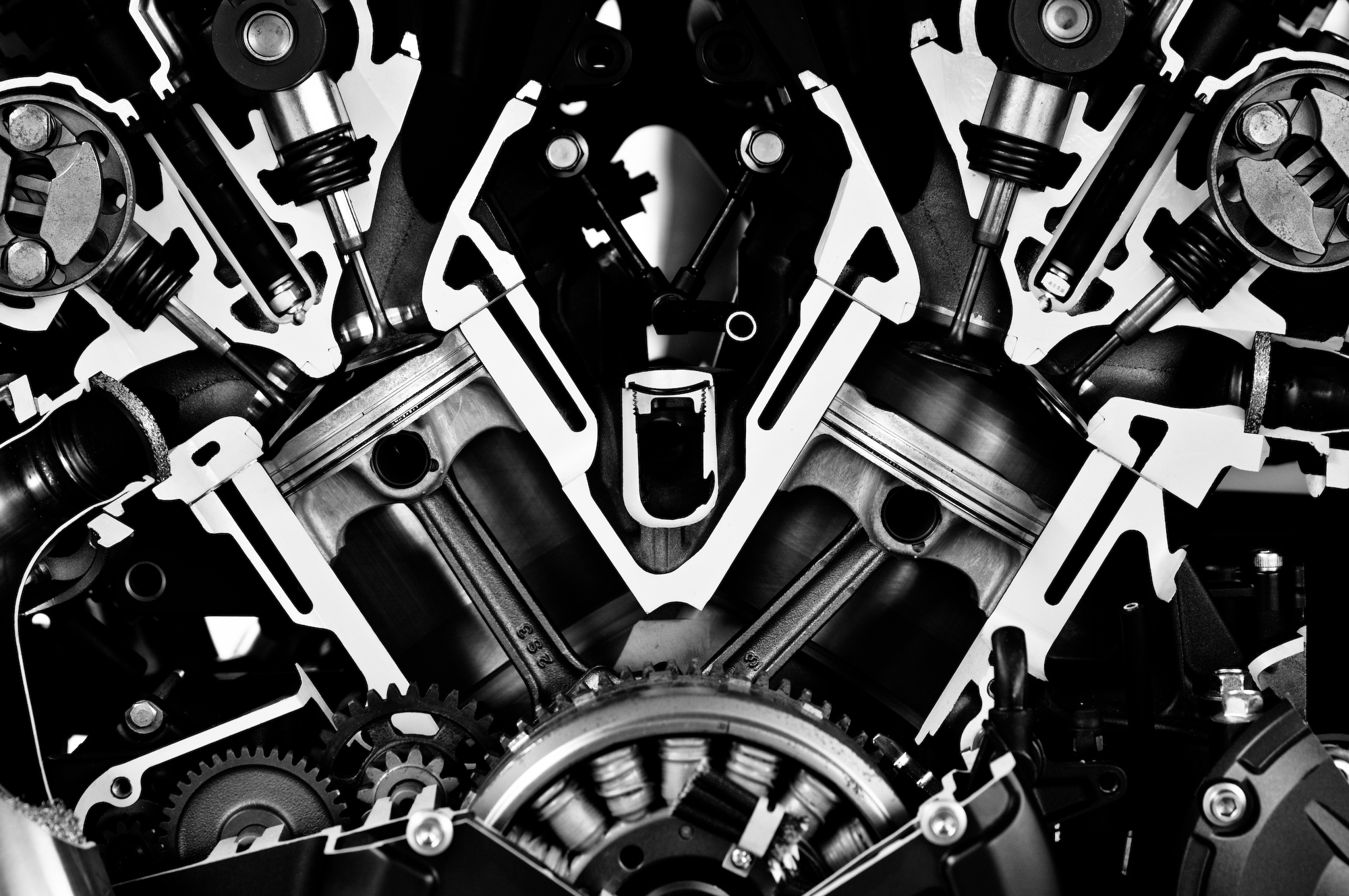
VMAX 2009 Engine cutaway

In 2005, at the 39th Tokyo Motor Show, Yamaha displayed an all-new V-Max concept bike. It featured a new chassis, upgraded components all around, and state-of-the-art braking components.

On 4 June 2008, Yamaha officially released a completely redesigned 2009 VMAX in North America and Europe. The new VMAX includes an all-aluminum frame with its 1,679 cc (102 cu in) liquid-cooled 65° V4 DOHC engine used as a stressed member of the chassis, an electroluminescent instrument readout, Yamaha Chip Controlled Intake (YCC-I), fully adjustable suspension, anti-lock brakes, slipper clutch, a fuel tank beneath the seat, and a distinctive key.

On 20 September 2009, VMAX was also launched in India.

=== YCC-I/YCC-T ===
Instead of the V-Boost on the original carbureted Yamaha V-Max, the fuel injected VMAX uses YCC-I and YCC-T. Yamaha Chip Controlled Intake (YCC-I) is a new addition to the VMAX. The airhorns inside the airbox are lifted by a servo activated at 6,650 rpm to open up the airway underneath. This shortens the length of the intake system from 150 mm to 52 mm. This system first appeared in the Yamaha motorcycle lineup on the 2006 YZF-R1. The MV Agusta F4 Tamburini was the first bike with such a system. Massimo Tamburini invented this idea. It is called Torque Shift System (TSS) on the MV Agustas.

Yamaha Chip Controlled Throttle (YCC-T) is also a new addition. The throttle cables are connected to a throttle position sensor (TPS),and a new computer called G.E.N.I.C.H. which operates the butterfly valves, the EXUP valve in the exhaust and the other components involved, such as the igniter unit, and the YCC-I lifter unit. The YCC-T computes all the input of the sensors and calculates the best throttle position, ignition advance, EXUP valve and injection time in milliseconds.

== Popular culture ==
The original Yamaha V-max was featured in films, including Gorgeous and Mechanical Violator Hakaider, in which the protagonists ride the motorcycle. The protagonist of the 1997 role-playing game Final Fantasy VII, Cloud Strife, rides a motorbike based on the V-Max.

The Yamaha V-max 1200 was used in the 1990 pilot of the TV series The Flash, as a motorcycle used by both the police force and criminals.

The 2009 VMAX appears in the film Ghost Rider 2, where it is ridden by Nicolas Cage, and the 2006 motorcycle racing game Tourist Trophy.

== See also ==
- List of Yamaha motorcycles
