= Alan Waldron (cricketer) =

English cricketer

Personal information
- Full name: Alan Noel Edwin Waldron
- Born: 23 December 1920; Southsea, Hampshire, England
- Died: 2 September 1999 (aged 78); Richmond, London, England
- Batting: Right-handed
- Bowling: Right-arm fast-medium

Domestic team information
- Years: Team
- 1948: Hampshire

Career statistics
Competition	First-class
Matches	4
Runs scored	91
Batting average	13.00
100s/50s	–/1
Top score	52
Balls bowled	396
Wickets	3
Bowling average	68.00
5 wickets in innings	–
10 wickets in match	–
Best bowling	2/66
Catches/stumpings	3/–
- Source: Cricinfo, 16 January 2010

Alan Noel Edwin Waldron MC & Bar (23 December 1920 — 2 September 1999) was an English first-class cricketer and an officer in the British Army.

Waldron was born in Southsea in December 1920. He was educated at St Edward's School, Oxford. Waldron served in the Second World War, being commissioned into the Hampshire Regiment as a second lieutenant in October 1939. While barracked on the Isle of Wight in January 1940, Waldron was involved in a road traffic collision with a Private Ralph Cooper, in which Cooper was killed. A jury at the subsequent inquest returned a verdict of accidental death. He was promoted to lieutenant in April 1941. Waldron was awarded the Military Cross (MC) in September 1943, and gained a bar to his MC in November 1945, two months after the end of the war. Following the war, he was promoted to captain in July 1946.

Waldron played first-class cricket on four occasions in 1948. His first two matches came for Hampshire against Cambridge University and the Combined Services, with both matches played at Aldershot. He followed these up with two appearances for the Combined Services, against Glamorgan at Pontypridd and Worcestershire at Worcester. He scored 91 runs in his four matches, with a highest score of 52 for Hampshire against the Combined Services. With his right fast-medium bowling, he took three wickets.

Waldron retired active service in May 1952 with a gratuity, at which point he was granted the honorary rank of major. He died in Richmond at the Royal Star and Garter Home on 2 September 1999. He was subsequently cremated at the Putney Vale Crematorium on 23 September.
