= Atsushi Taira =

Japanese entrepreneur and investor

- 大蘿 淳司
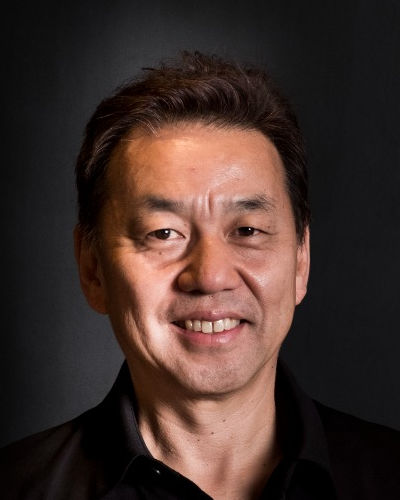
- Born: April 26, 1963 (age 63); Japan
- Education: Waseda University
- Occupations: Entrepreneur, investor

Atsushi Taira (大蘿淳司, born April 26, 1963) is a Japanese technology entrepreneur and investor. He co-founded The Edgeof, an ecosystem builder and venture capital entity, with Taizo Son, the youngest brother of SoftBank magnate Masayoshi Son.

He is also the managing director of Mistletoe Singapore, a global startup ecosystem builder focused on the Asia–Pacific region that is also active in supporting entrepreneurs and innovators that aim to solve current social problems.

== Early life ==
Atsushi Taira is from present-day Shūnan, Yamaguchi Prefecture. He started a research-oriented software development company while he was still a student at Waseda University, and he himself also participated as a programmer.

== Career ==
After graduation, he joined Arthur Andersen (present-day Accenture) where he engaged in consulting work. He was also a brand manager for Coca-Cola Japan, and the brand CEO of Richemont Japan Limited. In 2000, he joined DealTime.com (acquired by EBay) as co-chairman during the launch of its Japanese subsidiary.

In 2003, he became the first general manager for marketing at Yahoo! Japan. In this capacity, he appeared on variety programs for Fuji Television, wherein he gave commentary on Yahoo! search rankings and keywords. In 2008, he became the chairman of Myspace Japan. As social networking services experienced a boom in Japan with the arrival of Facebook and the rapid growth of the Japanese social networking service Mixi, Myspace Japan was supportive in expanding the Japanese music market globally.

In 2010 he became involved in the development of SoftBank's social network and music streaming service. In 2011 he became a director of Bharti SoftBank Holdings, a joint venture between SoftBank and Bharti Enterprises, whose flagship company Bharti Airtel is one of the largest mobile network operators globally. This joint venture invested in the instant messaging application Hike Messenger, which became the youngest startup in India to reach unicorn status with a value of $1.4 billion. In 2012 he became the Managing Executive Director and Head of the Global Business Strategy Department of SoftBank Mobile, where he was involved in the expansion of its mobile business in the United States and Southeast Asia.

In 2016 he became involved with Mistletoe, a Japanese entrepreneurial ecosystem builder led by Taizo Son, and in 2017 he became the managing director of Mistletoe Singapore. In 2023, he and Son co-founded The Edgeof, an ecosystem builder and venture capital entity with the aim of creating a support environment for startups that envision solving current social problems. In April 2023 The Edgeof and SoftBank announced that an agreement was reached wherein The Edgeof would acquire SoftBank Ventures Asia, a wholly owned SoftBank subsidiary, to establish a pan-Asian ecosystem for pioneering startups.
