= Atsushi Kita =

Japanese baseball player

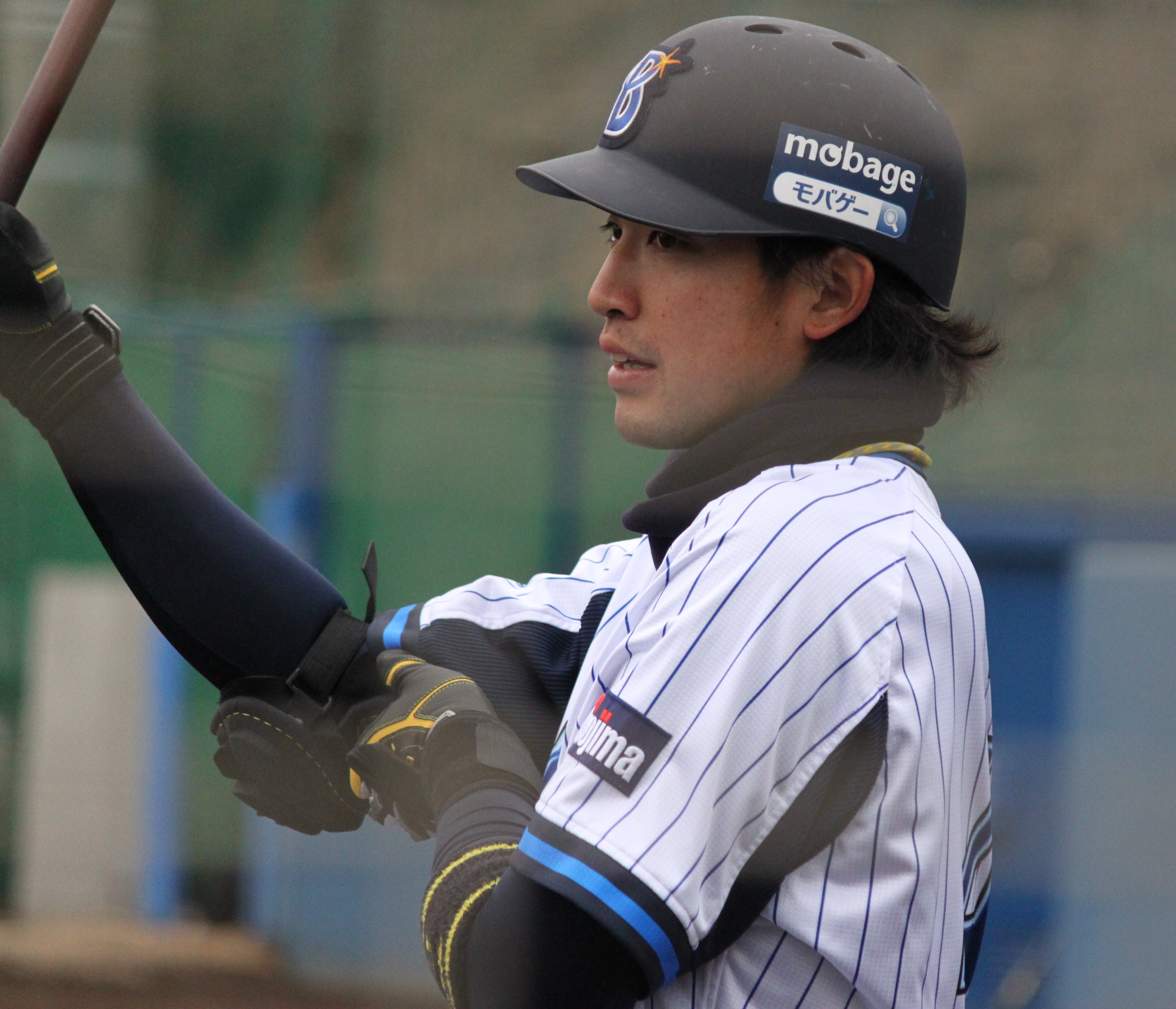
- Kita with the Yokohama DeNA BayStars
- Outfielder
- Born: November 26, 1988 (age 37); Ishikawa, Japan
- Bats: Left Throws: Right

debut
- 2010, for the Yokohama BayStars

Career statistics (through 2016 season)
- Batting average: .247
- Home runs: 2
- RBI: 4

Teams
- Yokohama DeNA BayStars/Yokohama BayStars (2007–2012); Hokkaido Nippon-Ham Fighters (2013–2015); Yomiuri Giants (2015–2017)

Atsushi Kita (北 篤, Kita Atsushi) is a Japanese professional baseball player for the Yomiuri Giants.
