= Atsushi Hachisu =

Japanese writer

Atsushi Hachisu (蜂巣 敦, Hachisu Atsushi) (born 1963 in Tochigi Prefecture, Japan) is a Japanese non-fiction writer for murders and a critic for manga. He dropped out of Waseda University. He writes books about Japanese serial or spree killers such as Tsutomu Miyazaki, Sataro Fukiage and Mutsuo Toi.

In March 1993, Hachisu released Devilman Ron (デビルマン論, Debiruman Ron, "Dissertation of Devilman") with the support of Go Nagai, the author of the manga Devilman. The book covered not the anime adaption of the Devilman but the original manga by Go Nagai.

On November 30, 2000, he released the book "Kyosen no Ikikata" Jissen Manual: Daredemo Dekiru Semi Retire.

His 2003 book Satsujin Genba o Aruku became a subject of reviews such as NHK's Shūkan Book Review and Yomiuri Shimbun.

== Works ==
- "Shokuzai no Anagram" Miyazaki Tsutomu no Sekai (「贖罪のアナグラム」宮崎勤の世界) (1990) ISBN 4-89419-005-2
- Document Renzoku Shōjo Satsujin―Kokōno Oni Fukiage Satarō (ドキュメント・連続少女殺人―孤高の鬼・吹上佐太郎) (1993) ISBN 4-89419-101-6
- Devilman Ron (デビルマン論, Dissertation of Devilman) (1993) ISBN 4-938733-05-6
- M no Occultism: Majutsushi Tachi no Hanzai (Mのオカルティズム―魔術師たちの犯罪) (1995) ISBN 4-89419-121-0
- Nihon no Satsujinsha (日本の殺人者, Japanese Murderers) (1998) ISBN 4-88379-012-6
- "Kyosen no Ikikata" Jissen Manual: Daredemo Dekiru Semi Retire (「巨泉の生き方」実践マニュアル―誰でもできるセミ・リタイア) (2000) ISBN 4-88718-581-2
- Satsujin Genba o Aruku (殺人現場を歩く) (2003) ISBN 4-8130-1081-4
- Yatsuhakamura wa Jitsuzaisuru (「八つ墓村」は実在する) (2005) ISBN 4-8130-2029-1
- Jitsuwa Kaikitan (実話怪奇譚, True Strange Stories) (2005) ISBN 4-480-42097-5
- Satsujin Genba o Aruku 2 Undercurrent (殺人現場を歩く2 undercurrent) (2006) ISBN 4-8130-2042-9
