= Atsushi Ichijo =

Japanese motorcycle designer

Atsushi Ichijō (一條 厚 (Ichijō Atsushi), born 1948 in Morioka, Iwate Prefecture, Japan) is a Japanese motorcycle designer and industrial engineer, best known for creating the concept and aesthetics of the original first-generation Yamaha VMAX, introduced in 1985. He has been recognized as a "legend designer" within the motorcycle industry.

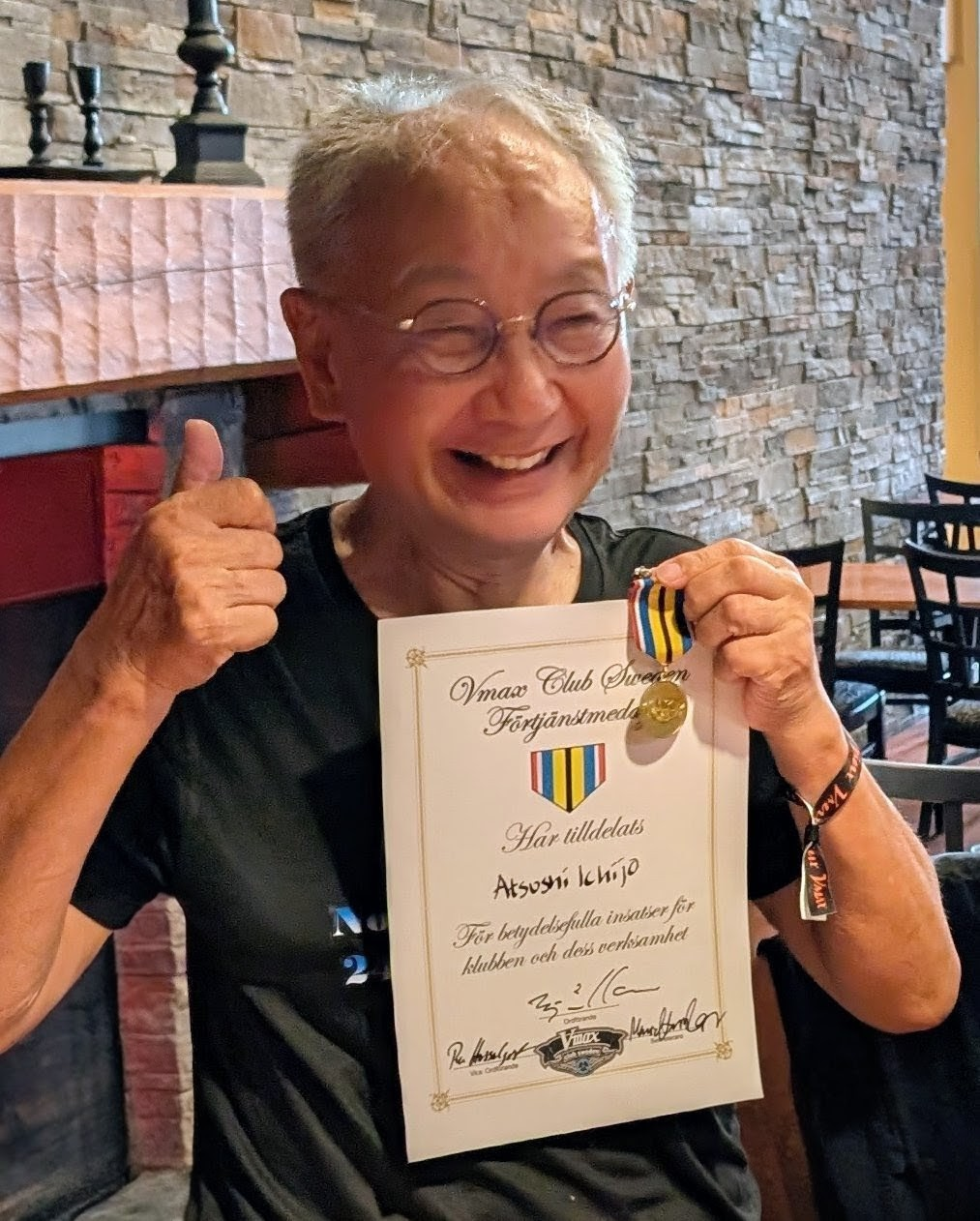
Atsushi Ichijō (一條 厚) receiving the Gold Medal of Merit from the Swedish Vmax Club in July 2025

== Biography ==
Ichijō graduated from Tokyo University of the Arts and began his design career at GK Industrial Design Associates in 1978. In 1980, he was posted to GK Design International in the U.S., where he participated in the development of the first Vmax for Yamaha Motor Company. Upon returning to Japan, he designed a wide array of Yamaha products—ranging from Yamaha SRX and cruiser motorcycles to snowmobiles, ATVs, generators, and show models such as the XS‑V1 Sakura, Y125 MOEGI, and XTW250 RYOKU, and later became the president and CEO of GK Dynamics Co. Ltd, until his retirement in 2018. Following retirement, he has continued to participate in industry educational programs.

== Yamaha Vmax development ==
The Vmax was created in the early 1980s by a team led by Akira Araki, with Atsushi Ichijō credited as the Yamaha designer driving its concept and aesthetics, supported by input from product planner Ed Burke and stylist John Reed.

The Vmax stayed in production from 1985 until 2007 with minimal changes; its styling and acceleration made it an instant classic despite criticism for soft suspension and limited cornering ability.

== Design philosophy ==
Ichijō’s design philosophy emphasized merging aesthetic beauty with functional performance. drawing inspiration from aerodynamics and his childhood memories from living close to a U.S. Air base as well as his firsthand experience riding across the U.S. on an XS650.

== Industry recognition ==
Within the Japanese motorcycle design community, Ichijō has been described as a "legendary designer" recognized even by rival manufacturers. He has served as keynote speaker for the Motorcycle Design Public Lecture program, an industry-wide educational initiative where designers from competing manufacturers such as Honda, Yamaha/GK, Suzuki, and Kawasaki collaborate to train aspiring designers. Notably, he has headlined events organized by rival manufacturers such as Kawasaki.

== Legacy and influence ==
The original Yamaha Vmax (1985–2007) has developed a strong following. While the model was initially aimed at the U.S. market, it has found enduring popularity in Europe, where owners’ clubs, custom builds, and annual gatherings have sustained interest in the motorcycle long after production ended. Vmax/VMAX meetings are held regularly in countries including Japan, Belgium, Germany, France, the Netherlands, UK, and across Scandinavia, which Ichijō himself has visited on occasion.

== Involvement in Yamaha VMAX Gen 2 (2009) ==
The second-generation VMAX (capitalised in marketing as VMAX), often referred to as the Gen 2, launched in 2009, was developed by a new team of designers within Yamaha and GK Dynamics.

Ichijō, at the time managing director of GK Dynamics, is not officially credited with an operative role in the company's design of the second-generation model. However, the 2009 VMAX retained several design elements reminiscent of the original, such as muscular proportions, air intake scoops, exposed mechanical components, and a performance-focused stance. The design team at GK Dynamics, supervised by Ichijō, received the Good Design Award in 2009 for the second-generation VMAX.

== Later work ==
Following his retirement from GK Dynamics in 2018, Ichijō has remained active in industrial design research. In 2024, he co-authored an academic study analyzing the relationship between wind turbine aesthetics and public acceptance of renewable energy infrastructure.

He has also contributed to Motor-Fan magazine as a freelance writer, producing a series of articles on motorcycle design titled "Motorcycle Designer's Design Talk".

== See also ==
- Yamaha VMAX
- Motorcycle design
