= Star and Garter Hotel, Richmond =

Former hotel in Richmond, London

Coordinates: 51.45024°N 0.2973°W

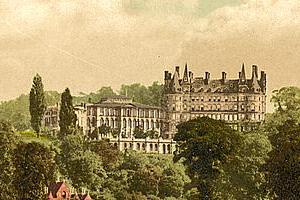
Postcard artwork of the Star and Garter Hotel in the 1890s

The Star and Garter Hotel in Richmond was a hotel located in the London countryside (later suburbs) on Richmond Hill overlooking the Thames Valley, on the site later occupied by the Royal Star and Garter Home, Richmond. The first establishment on the site, an inn built in 1738, was relatively small. This was followed by several other buildings of increasing size and varied design as the site changed from family ownership to being run by a limited company. Some of the rebuilding or extension work took place following fires that by 1888 had destroyed most of the original buildings. At various times architects were commissioned to build grand new buildings or extensions to take advantage of the famed view over the river and valley below, with the largest being the 1860s chateau block by E. M. Barry.

The hotel reached the peak of its fame as Richmond itself expanded in the 19th century during the Victorian era. In the period from the 1830s to the 1890s, the hotel guests ranged from literary figures such as Charles Dickens to exiled crowned heads of Europe such as King Louis-Philippe and his wife. The hotel's reputation spread to other countries, with guests arriving from the US and Europe, or travelling by horse and carriage from London to visit the area and stay at the hotel. In the later years of the 19th century, the hotel and its concert hall, banquet hall, and gardens were used for public dinners, fetes and fundraising gatherings, often attended by local grandees and members of the royal family.

Following the end of the Victorian era, the rise of the motor car and more widespread travel led to a decline in the hotel's fortunes, and it failed twice to be sold at auction. During World War I it was purchased by the Auctioneers and Estate Agents Institute and donated to Queen Mary in 1916 in support of her plans to establish a home for paralysed and permanently disabled soldiers. The hotel buildings were demolished and rebuilt as a care home beginning in 1919; the new building was dedicated in 1924 as the Women of the Empire's Memorial of the Great War.

== Early years ==
During the 18th century Richmond and its surroundings were mostly still countryside and parkland with several villas and estates along the River Thames, together with scattered villages and towns. The land on which the Star and Garter Hotel was later built was owned by the Earl of Dysart and is located on the river-facing side of Richmond Hill, next to the Richmond Gates of Richmond Park (enclosed 1637) and overlooking Petersham Common, an area of grazing meadows and common land between the hill and the river. The land, initially only enough for the building of a small inn in 1738, was leased from the Earl by a John Christopher (died 1758). This inn bore the name "Star and Garter", an allusion to the insignia of the Order of the Garter that was and still is common among inns and hotels around Britain.

Little is known about the subsequent early history other than a rebuilding of the inn, but in the year 1780 a private residence that had been built next to the inn became part of what could now be called a hotel, though it was also referred to as an inn or tavern. In the early 19th century, the establishment went through three owners starting with a Richard Brewer who leased more land from the Earl of Dysart in 1803. An idea of the value of the site can be ascertained from the rental value for the new land of 60 shillings per year. However, Brewer's management and expansion of the hotel left him over-extended financially and he was declared bankrupt and died in a debtors' prison in 1808.

The hotel then passed into the hands of a Christopher Crean who made changes and reopened the hotel in 1809. Prices, said to be half a sovereign to "look through a window", were considered "exorbitant". Following Crean's death in 1815, his widow continued to run the property, though with a mortgage of £4000. It was the need to pay off this mortgage that led to the hotel being sold in 1822, when it was purchased by a Joseph Ellis for £11,022.

== Ellis family ownership ==
The Ellis family would own the hotel for over 40 years, making several enlargements to the property. It was during this time that the hotel became widely known in London as it established itself as "a fashionable resort of London society, who used to drive out from town for luncheon or dinner".

One of those who stayed regularly at the hotel was the author Charles Dickens. He and his wife and his friend and biographer John Forster spent the day there on the Sunday in March 1838 when the first installments of Nicholas Nickleby were to be published. The occasion also coincided with the time of the year for Dickens' birthday and marriage anniversary, and a tradition developed and continued for 20 years to celebrate these events at the Star and Garter Hotel if they were in the country at the time. The hotel was said to be a "favourite resort" of Dickens, and he would meet friends there, or recover there after strenuous bouts of writing. Other events were held by Dickens at the Star and Garter, including a dinner in 1844 to mark the birth of his third son, and a famous dinner in 1850 that celebrated the start of the publication of David Copperfield. Guests at the latter dinner included Alfred, Lord Tennyson and William Thackeray.

Other dinners and meetings, held by societies and private individuals, took place at the hotel during the period of the Ellis family ownership, with some of them being reported in The Times, the leading newspaper of the day. These dinners included a banquet held in 1846 by the Irish Society to mark the Earl of Lincoln retiring from the post of Chief Secretary for Ireland, a public dinner in 1847 for The Scottish Hospital, a charity known today as the Royal Scottish Corporation, and a dinner hosted in June 1855 by the American entrepreneur and philanthropist George Peabody for Millard Fillmore, ex-President of the United States.

Among the most prestigious and celebrated events during this period was the stay at the hotel of the ex-royal family of France in 1848. Then known as the Count and Countess de Neuilly, and formerly Louis-Philippe I, King of the French and his queen Maria Amalia of Naples and Sicily, the couple and their entourage stayed at the Star and Garter while Maria recovered from the effects of the water at Claremont House. The family had been staying at Claremont following their arrival in the country in exile after the revolution in France. The stay at the hotel was several months long while the water pipes at Claremont were replaced, and the group consisted of 88 people occupying between 50 and 60 apartments.

The presence of these "illustrious exiles" in the area led to a visit in 1850 by Queen Victoria and Prince Albert. The Times reported this as the Queen's first visit to Richmond for "many years past" with crowds in attendance. On the arrival of the British royal party, the ex-French King greeted the British monarch and escorted her into the hotel to meet the ex-Queen. Louis-Philippe would die later that year, but his widow Maria (more usually referred to as Marie Amelie or just Amelie) would continue to frequent the hotel until her own death in 1866. One of the stays reported by The Times concerned the 1859 visit to see Marie Amelie by a group that included Ernest II, Duke of Saxe-Coburg and Gotha, Alexandrine of Baden, Duchess of Saxe Coburg Gotha, the Duchess of Cambridge and the Princess Mary Queen Victoria and Albert would also visit a few days later.

Joseph Ellis died in 1858, and the hotel passed to one of his sons, George, who ran the hotel until 1864.

== Star and Garter Company ==
In 1864, control of the hotel passed to a limited company (the Star and Garter Company) that was listed on the stock exchanges of the day. The company was run by a board of directors, while day-to-day running of the establishment was entrusted to a hotel manager. One of the major changes made was a large expansion by the building of a grand chateau-like building, designed by the architect Edward Middleton Barry, and the addition of a banqueting hall. These additions were completed by 1865, but were not universally well-received, with one critic describing the new building as a "wen" on the face of the hill.

During this period, dinners held here included the inaugural dinner in July 1866 of the Cobden Club, formed in memory of Richard Cobden, with a speech given by William Gladstone, a meeting in July 1866 that led to the formation of the world's first canoe club the Royal Canoe Club, the ninth Cholmeleian Society dinner in 1868, the annual dinner in 1868 of the officers of the 91st Argyllshire Highlanders, and another dinner in 1868 held by the Fishmongers' Company.

The hotel continued to attract royalty and aristocracy, with The Times reporting in 1869 the stay at the hotel of Prince Ludwig August of Saxe-Coburg and Gotha and his wife Princess Leopoldina of Brazil and their three children. The family had travelled from Brazil for the health of the young princess, but she died 2 years later aged 23. While in the area, the royal party visited the "Orleans family at Twickenham" (the members of the ex-royal family of France).

== 1870 fire and rebuilding ==
The old hotel building from before the 1864 extension was completely destroyed by a major fire on 12 January 1870. Although that section of the hotel had no guests at the time as it was the winter season, the hotel manager John Lever died in the fire. The fire and accounts of the dramatic rescue of one of the three people in the hotel at the time, was reported in the newspapers of the day as far afield as Australia. The hotel employee rescued from the flames wrote an account in a letter to The Times. There were attempts to locate the remains of Lever, but these were not found until March that year. An inquest was held with a verdict of accidental death. Those who took part in the fire rescue attempts received awards for their bravery.

In 1871, the hotel was sold at auction for a figure of £2,700, which with mortgages of £31,000 was a total of £33,700. Further details of liquidations relating to the Star and Garter Company were reported in The Times in 1873. Following this upheaval, the gutted site of the old building was eventually cleared and new buildings were erected by 1874 to designs by the architect Charles J. Phipps. Other changes were also made; the banqueting hall became a "Grand Concert Hall", while the new buildings included a pavilion with a large ballroom. In 1888, another fire destroyed the coffee rooms, which had been the last remnant of the pre-1864 buildings.

== Late Victorian era ==
During the following decades (the late 1870s to 1890s), numerous functions and charity and society dinners were held at the hotel. One of the major events was the one to celebrate the incorporation of the Municipal Borough of Richmond in 1890, an event which was celebrated with a fete in Old Deer Park and a dinner at the hotel, followed by fireworks in the gardens. Other major events included the fete in 1891 to celebrate the 600th anniversary of the Swiss Confederation, and the dinner, fete, band performance and fireworks held to mark the end of the International Congress of Naval Architects and Marine Engineers in 1897.

Several concerts and fundraising events were held at the hotel and its Grand Concert Hall in this period. In 1879, a recitation was given by the actor Samuel Brandram and the singer Isabella Glyn. Several events were held to raise funds for the local hospital, the Richmond Royal Hospital, including a concert in 1879 attended by the Duchess of Teck and the Duchess of Connaught. More funds were raised in 1893 at a public dinner for "Princess May's Ward for Children", presided over by the Duke of Cambridge., with another banquet in November the same year. In 1895, a bazaar was held at the hotel and in its grounds in aid of the Missions to Seamen, opened by the Duchess of Teck. A similar event in 1897, held over two days, supported the Church of England's Waifs and Strays Society, and was opened on the first day by Princess Christian of Schleswig-Holstein, and on the second day by Princess Edward of Saxe-Weimar. The site was also the location for local school prize ceremonies, as in 1895 when the Bishop of Salisbury presided at the prize-giving ceremony for Richmond High School.

Dinners continued to be held at the hotel's dining rooms and banqueting hall. One of these banquets was the one held in 1870 to celebrate the granting of a government loan for the Honduras Interoceanic Railway. The banquet was hosted by the Honduras minister Don Carlos Gutierrez. In 1879, a court dinner was held by the Founders' Company. Some of the dinners celebrated industrial milestones, such as the one held in 1885 by the American businessman and financier Cyrus West Field to celebrate the 27th anniversary of the laying of the first Atlantic Cable. Politicians would also gather to dine at the hotel, with many Tory grandees and MPs attending a dinner in 1888 in honour of Sir John Whittaker Ellis MP. This Ellis, who would later become the first Mayor of Richmond, was one of the sons of the Joseph Ellis who had owned the hotel on this site that had burned down in 1870. Others present at this dinner included the Duke of Cambridge, the Duke of Teck, Sir William Thackeray Marriott (MP), Sir Edward Hertslet, Sir Henry Peek, Captain Charles William Selwyn (MP) and Mr James Bigwood (MP).

Those that stayed at the hotel during this period included visiting foreign royalty from the Empire, including the Maharaja Sayajirao Gaekwad III and his wife, who visited in 1892. Another court dinner was held in 1898 by the Worshipful Company of Coachmakers and Coach Harness Makers. In 1899, the chess players taking part in the London 1899 chess tournament were entertained at the hotel. Also in 1899, a scientific society dinner was held when the Physiological Society congratulated Sir John Burdon-Sanderson and Michael Foster for the honours conferred on them by the Queen. More local affairs in 1901 were the banquet for Max Waechter attended by the Mayor and Mayoress, and the inaugural banquet of the Richmond Horticultural Society, chaired by Leopold de Rothschild.

During this period, the financing of the hotel continued to be arranged through companies run by a board of directors. An issuing of shares in the management company was announced in The Times in 1887. This notice included an extensive description of the hotel company, the hotel itself (number of rooms and layout), and various valuations and salaries. One of the named directors of the company was the Sunderland MP Edward Temperley Gourley. The hotel fire of September 1888 was reported by The Times. Further changes to the management of the establishment took place in 1892 following the death of the hotel's proprietor Antonio Mella. An advert of 1897 describes the hotel as follows:

This historic hotel commands the loveliest views in the Kingdom. No London fog. Highest class cuisines and wines. Excellent stabling, horses, and carriages. Billiards.

— The Times, Thursday, 11 February 1897

== Decline and redevelopment ==
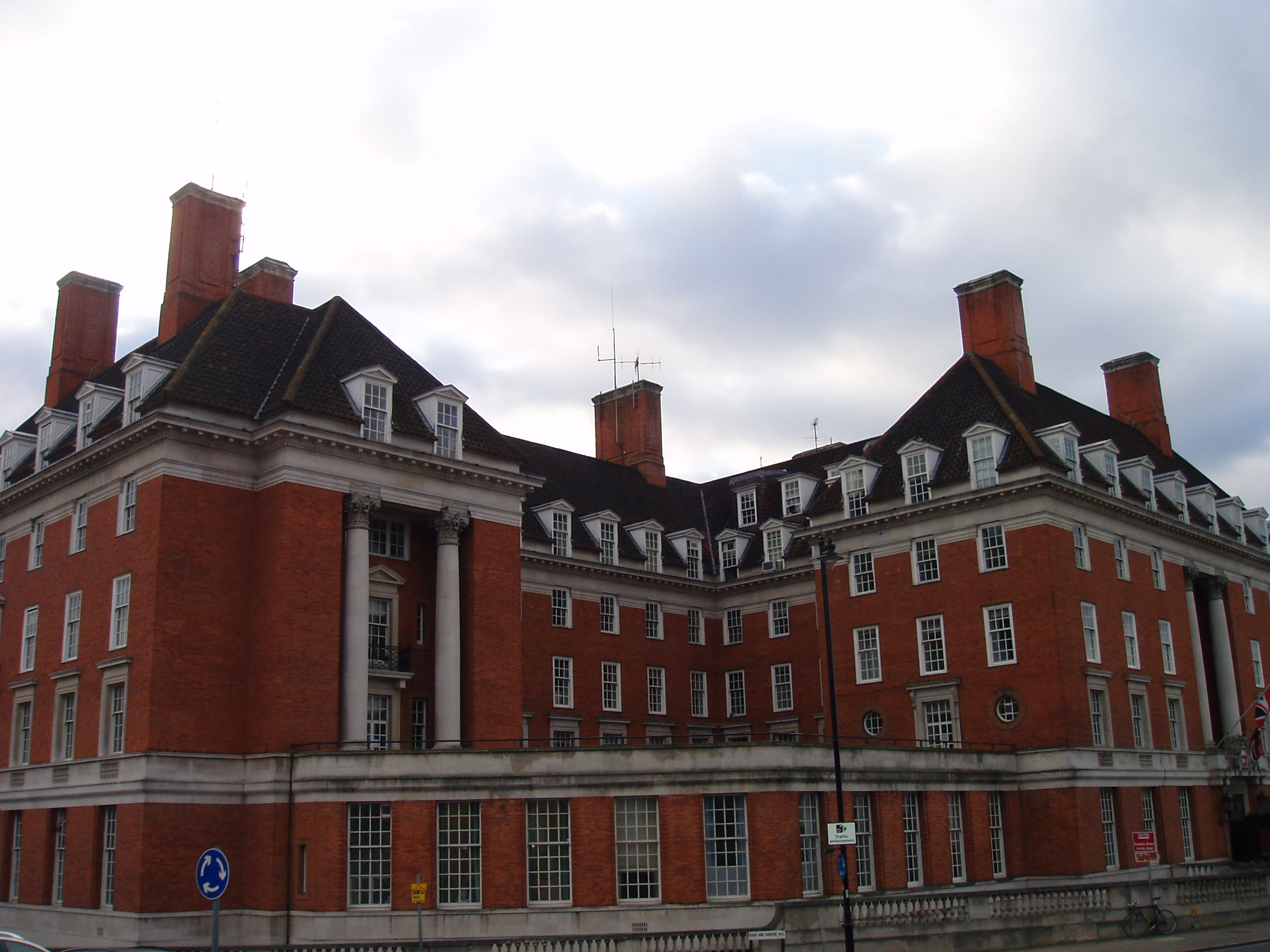
Star and Garter Home in March 2010

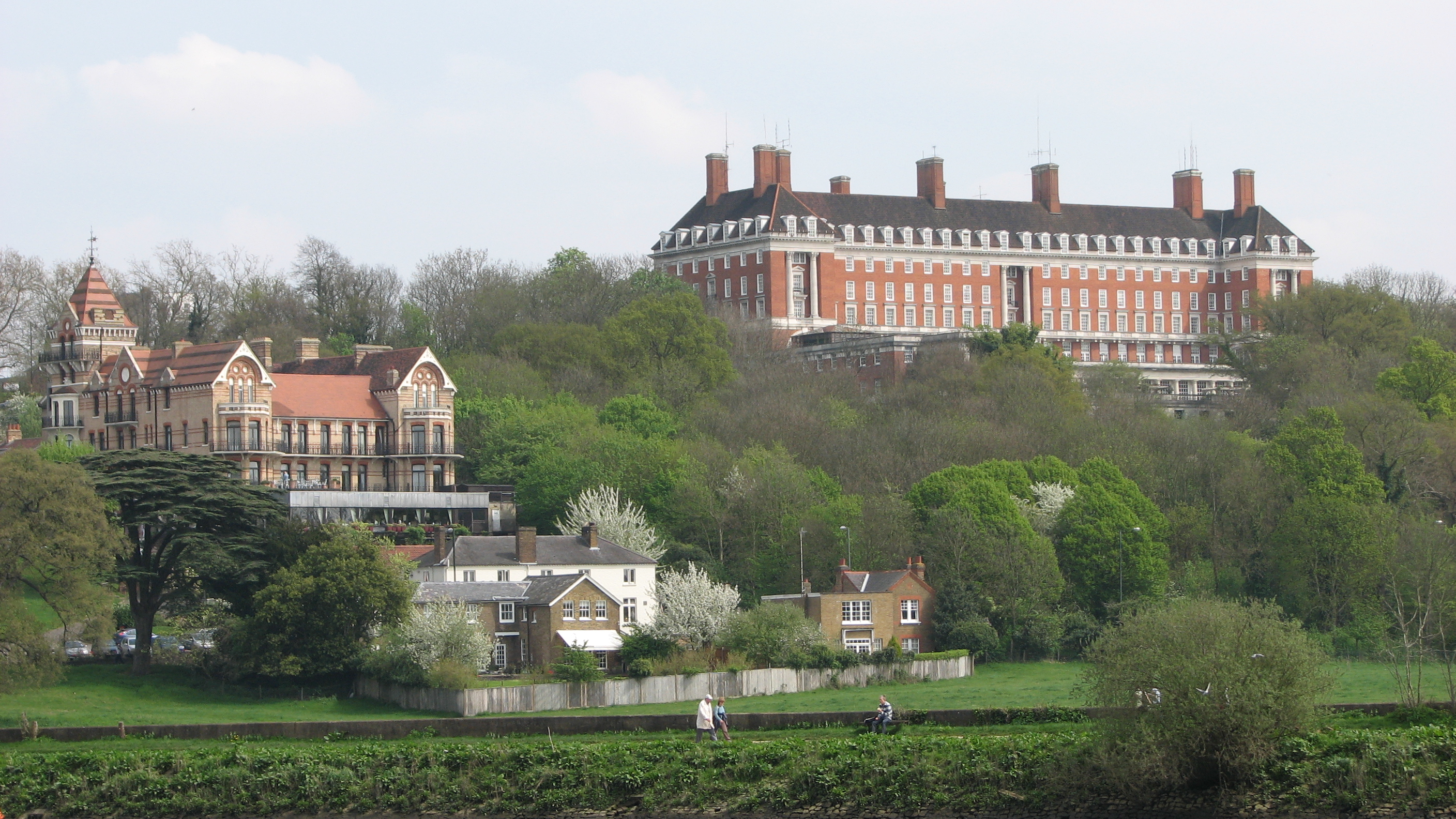
The Petersham Hotel (left) and the Star and Garter Home (right), April 2009

Following the end of the Victorian era, and the rise of the motor car and more widespread travel, the hotel went into decline. It was used several times as a venue for the annual mayoral dinners. It also continued to host charitable events such as the 1906 annual meeting for the National Society for the Protection of Young Girls, attended by Princess Louise and the Duke of Argyll, and was still known as a place to dine at; in George Bernard Shaw's 1906 play The Doctor's Dilemma it features as the venue of a dinner held by a fashionable physician to celebrate his knighthood, and it was similarly noted by the author A. E. W. Mason, who conceived of the detective Hanaud and the novel At the Villa Rose after dining at the hotel in 1905. However, the decline was irreversible and the hotel was eventually put up for auction failing twice to be sold in 1907 and 1909. It eventually sold in 1909 for £18,000, and then sold again in 1911 and again in 1912, with plans to refurbish or redevelop the hotel never coming to fruition before the outbreak of World War I in 1914.

During the war the hotel and its land was purchased with funds raised from a public appeal by the Auctioneers and Estate Agents Institute, with the freehold being valued at around £25,000. The site was then donated to Queen Mary in support of her plans to establish a home for paralysed and permanently disabled soldiers. The hotel banqueting hall and ballroom were temporarily used to house disabled soldiers, but the site was found to be unsuitable for their specialised needs and the hotel buildings were demolished in 1919 and rebuilt as the Star and Garter Home. The new building was dedicated in 1924 as the Women of the Empire's Memorial of the Great War.

The Royal Star & Garter Homes, the charitable trust running the home, announced in 2011 that it would be selling the building as it did not now meet modern requirements and could not be easily or economically upgraded. The building, which is Grade II listed, was sold in April 2013 for £50 million to a housing developer, London Square, which restored and converted the building into apartments.

== Sources ==
- The Original ‘Star and Garter’, Richmond Hill, Local History Notes, Richmond Libraries' Local Studies Collection, accessed 19 April 2010
- Dickens in Richmond upon Thames, Local History Notes, Richmond Libraries' Local Studies Collection, accessed 19 April 2010
- The Royal Manor of Richmond with Petersham, Ham and Kew, Mrs Arthur G. Bell, London, 1907 - pp 60; pp 88-89; pp 100
- Coming of Age of Star and Garter Home, Local News (England and Wales), 190 JA-4. 23, British Medical Journal, 190, 23 January 1937
- London and Its Environs, 1927, by Findlay Muirhead, 1927
- The Times Digital Archive (1785-1985)
