= Yamaha Royal Star Tour Deluxe =

Cruiser type touring motorcycle

The Yamaha Royal Star Tour Deluxe is a cruiser type touring motorcycle built by the Yamaha Motor Company. It was introduced in 1997 and was manufactured, largely unchanged, until 2005 through the 2009 model year. The Royal Star Tour Deluxe uses the same framework as the Yamaha Royal Star Venture without the Venture's fairing, radio system, and trunk.

== Vehicle information ==
=== Appearance ===
There are two basic models: standard and S. The standard model has brushed front forks while the S model has chrome front forks. The two models also have different color paint.

=== Mechanical ===
The Royal Star Tour Deluxe is a large motorcycle. Rider seat height is 29.1 in (740 mm). It weighs 787 lb (357 kg) dry, which yields a weight of 844 lb (383 kg) with oil, coolant, and a full fuel tank. The Royal Star Tour Deluxe has a 67.5 in (1,710 mm) wheelbase. The shock absorbers are air adjustable for preload to help compensate for different load sizes. It has 9.3 gallons of storage in its hard side bags.

The drive package on the Royal Star Tour Deluxe is the same as the Yamaha Royal Star Venture including a liquid cooled 1,298 cc (79.2 cu in) (referred to as 1,300 cc) V4 engine. It has four valves per cylinder, overhead camshafts, and shim over bucket valves. The five speed overdrive transmission is part of the engine case and both the engine and transmission share oil. The drive shaft and final drive assembly are built into the left side of the double sided swing arm. Swing arm motion is damped by a monoshock mounted in the center of the frame. The clutch is of the wet plate design and is hydraulically activated by the left hand lever.

The brakes are all two piston design. Both front brakes are activated by the right hand lever. The rear brake is activated by the foot pedal on the right.
