= Royal Star and Garter Home, Richmond =

Royal Star and Garter Home
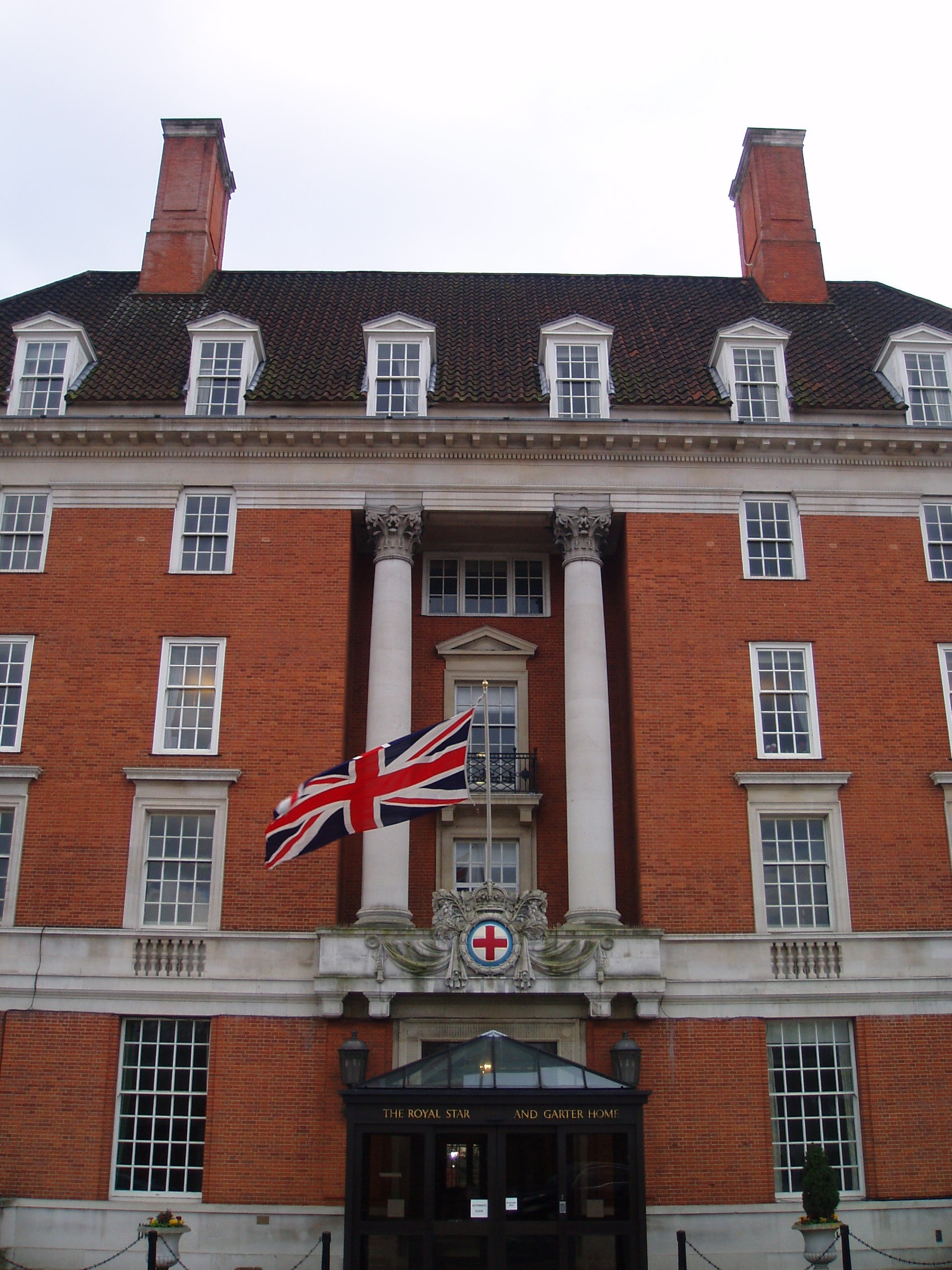

General information
- Location: Richmond, London, UK
- Coordinates: 51.4502°N 0.2974°W
- Construction started: 1921
- Completed: 1924

Design and construction
- Architects: Sir Edwin Cooper, based on a 1915 plan by Sir Giles Gilbert Scott

Listed Building – Grade II
- Official name: Royal Star and Garter Home
- Designated: 30 May 1990
- Reference no.: 1254353

The Royal Star and Garter Home on Richmond Hill, in Richmond, London, was built between 1921 and 1924 to a design by Sir Edwin Cooper, based on a plan produced by Sir Giles Gilbert Scott in 1915, to provide accommodation and nursing facilities for 180 seriously injured servicemen.

Royal Star & Garter, the charitable trust running the home, announced in 2011 that it would be selling the building as it did not now meet modern requirements and could not be easily or economically upgraded. The building, which is Grade II listed, was sold in April 2013 for £50 million to a housing developer, London Square, which has restored the building and converted it into apartments.

The trust opened a new 60-room home in Solihull in the West Midlands in 2008 and the remaining residents at the Richmond home moved in 2013 to a new purpose-built 63-room building in Upper Brighton Road, Surbiton, in the Royal Borough of Kingston upon Thames. A third home has now opened in High Wycombe, Buckinghamshire. The possibility of opening a fourth home is also under consideration, and funds were set aside for this purpose.

== History ==
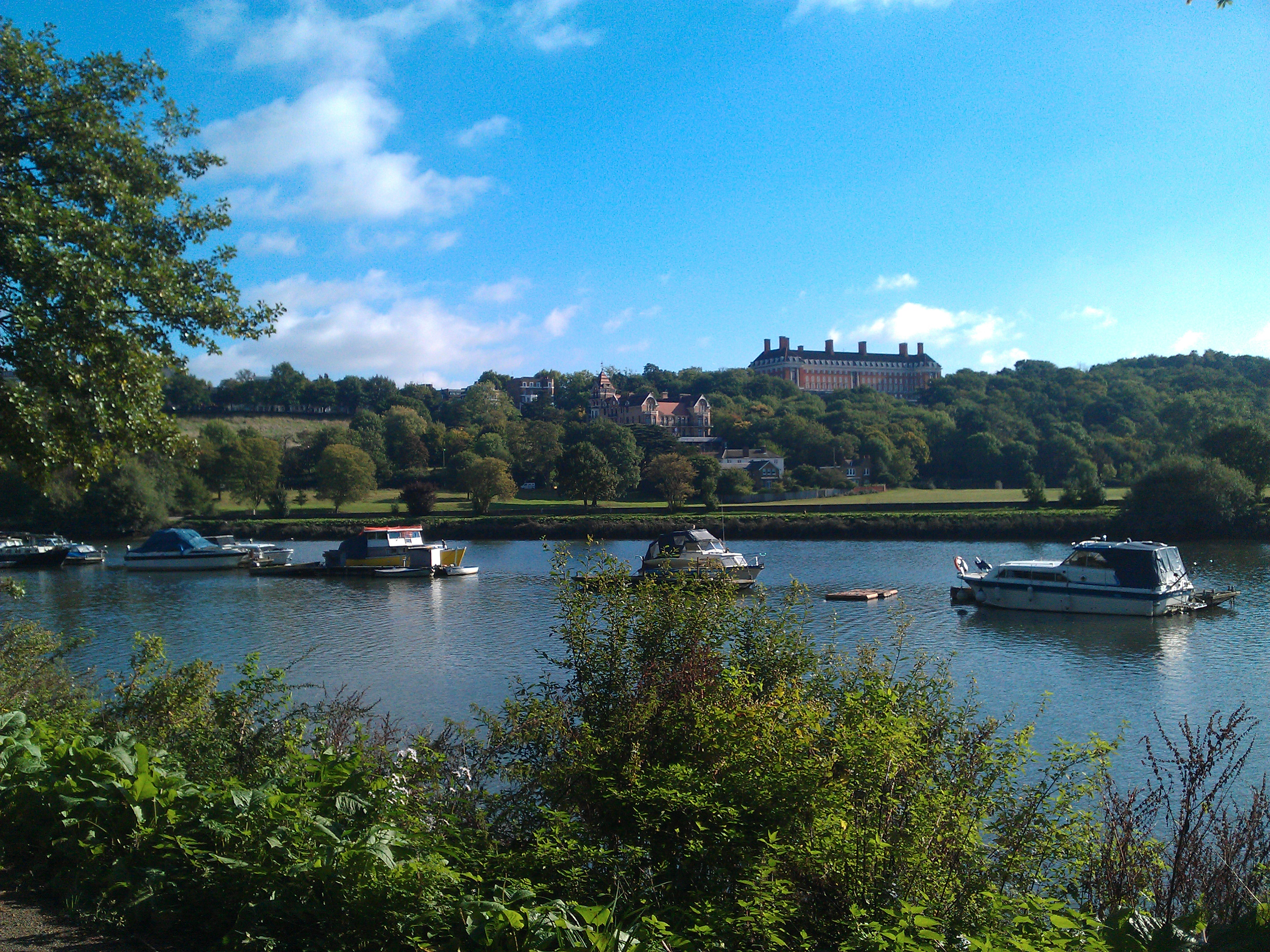
Riverside view from Twickenham bank

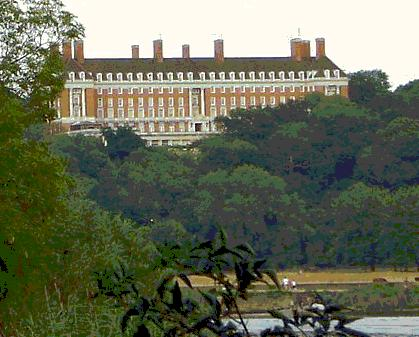
The Royal Star and Garter Home

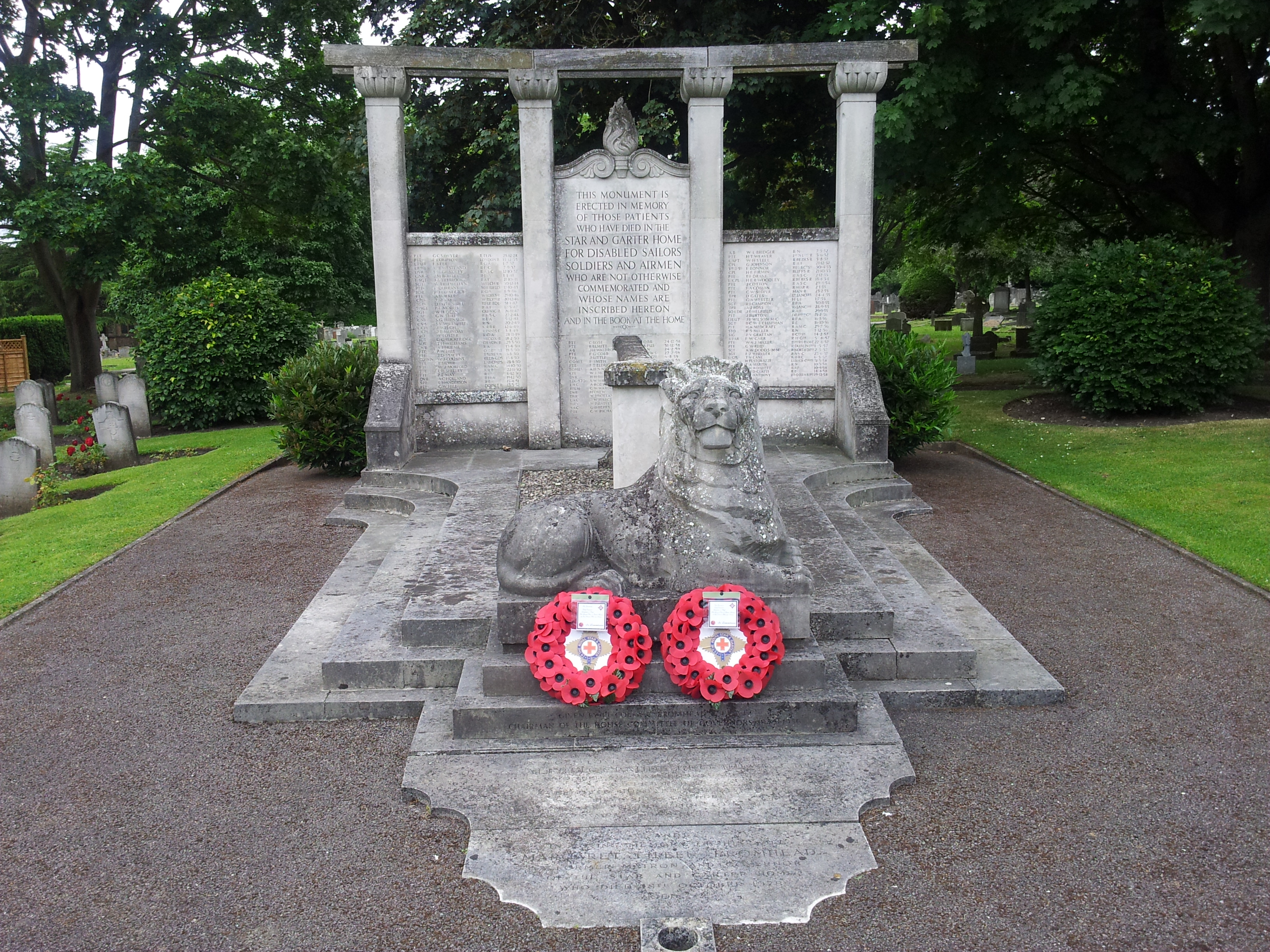
The Bromhead Memorial, in the nearby Richmond Cemetery, commemorates deceased residents of the Home

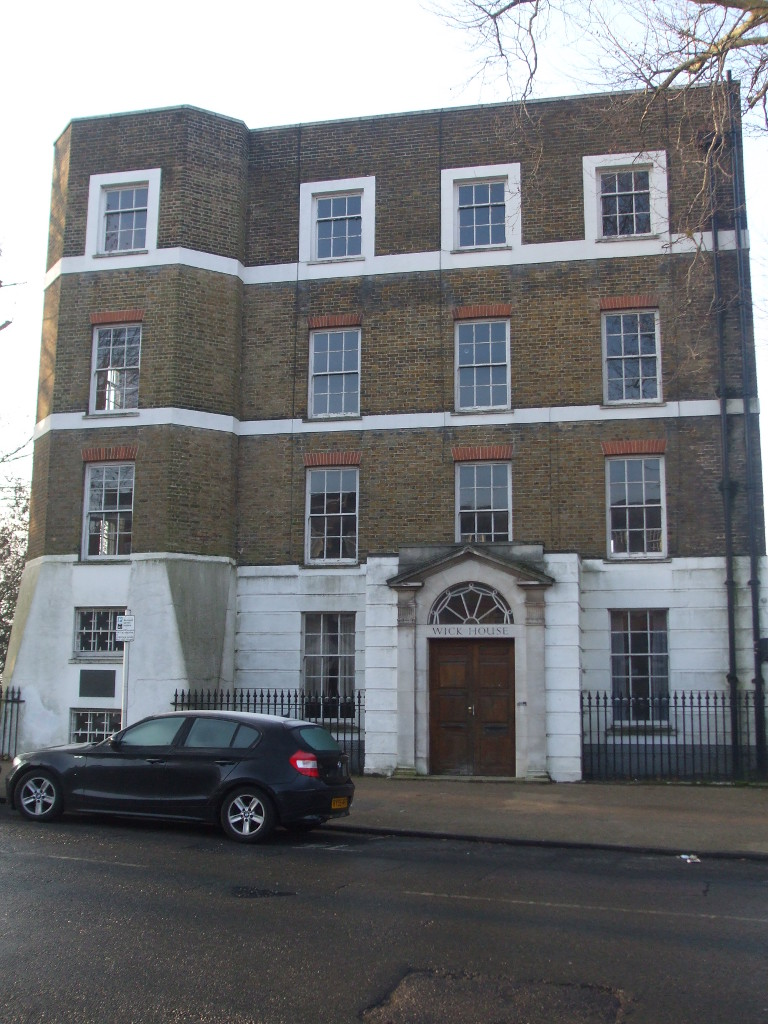
Wick House, former home for the Star and Garter Home's nurses

The site is the location of the former Star and Garter Hotel, which closed in 1906. The building was used as a military hospital, known as the Star and Garter Home for Disabled Sailors and Soldiers, during World War I.

The site was then donated to Queen Mary (consort of George V) in support of her plans to establish a home for paralysed and permanently disabled soldiers. The hotel banqueting hall and ballroom were temporarily used to house disabled soldiers, but they were found to be unsuitable for their specialised needs. Demolition of the hotel buildings commenced in 1919, and from 1920 to 1924 the home's residents were transferred to Sandgate, Kent, while the new Star and Garter Home for Disabled Sailors, Soldiers and Airmen was built on the site of the hotel. The new building was formally opened by George V and Queen Mary on 10 July 1924, dedicated as the Women of the Empire's Memorial of the Great War.

In 1948 residents of the home took part in a forerunner of the Paralympic Games, the first national athletic event for disabled athletes, organised by Dr Ludwig Guttmann.

The Star and Garter Home received its royal charter in 1979, adding the prefix "Royal" to its name. Since the opening of the second home at Solihull in 2008 the charity has used a plural form of the name, as "The Royal Star & Garter Homes".

Some of the residents who died at the home were buried in one of two dedicated sections in the nearby Richmond Cemetery. The cemetery contains two plots dedicated to deceased residents from the home, one of which is marked by the Bromhead Memorial, a large classical-style monument listing the names of those not commemorated elsewhere.

== Notable residents ==
Notable residents have included:

- Frederick Jeremiah Edwards (1894–1964), an Irish recipient of the Victoria Cross, who died at the home on 9 March 1964
- Norman "Bill" Jewell (1913–2004), commander of the submarine HMS Seraph during Operation Mincemeat. In 1998, he suffered a serious fall and was paralysed from the neck down. He then went to live at the home until his death on 18 August 2004 aged 90.
- Major David Mills (1918–1993), Secretary General of the All England Lawn Tennis and Croquet Club 1963–1979
- Bevis Shergold (1919–1997), track and field athlete who competed in the 1938 European Athletics Championships and the 1948 Summer Olympics. During World War II she was an intelligence servicewoman and was one of the first women to be posted aboard. She worked in Egypt and Algeria as a translator during the interrogation of prisoners of war.
- Alan Waldron MC & Bar (1920–1999), cricketer and an officer in the Hampshire Regiment during the Second World War, in which he was awarded the Military Cross and bar.
- Nancy Wake (1912–2011), who fought with the French Resistance and lived in the home from 2003 until her death. She died on 7 August 2011, aged 98, at Kingston Hospital after being admitted with a chest infection.

== Notable chairmen of the Home ==
- Admiral Sir Barry Domvile, 1932–1934
- Admiral of the Fleet Sir Caspar John, 1967–1972
- General Sir Charles Harington, 1972–1980
- Marshal of the RAF Sir Denis Spotswood, 1981–1985

== See also ==
- Bromhead Memorial, denoting a plot in Richmond Cemetery in which deceased residents of the Royal Star and Garter Home are buried
- John Burn, honorary anaesthetist at the Star and Garter Home
- W. S. C. Copeman, consultant rheumatologist
- Wick House, Richmond Hill, which, from 1950, accommodated up to 20 nurses from the Royal Star and Garter Home
