= Royal Star & Garter =

English charity

Royal Star & Garter is a charitable trust established in 1916 in Richmond, London to care for severely disabled young men returning from the First World War. Queen Mary of Teck was the patron of the charity, a role taken on by Princess Alexandra, The Honourable Lady Ogilvy since 1964.

The Stoke Mandeville Games, the first recorded competition between disabled athletes, was organised by Dr Ludwig Guttmann, consultant at Stoke Mandeville Hospital between disabled archers from his hospital and those from the Royal Star and Garter Home in 1948.

The trust, which is now based at Hampton, previously ran the former Royal Star and Garter Home, Richmond. As at 2024 it runs three homes in Solihull, Surbiton and High Wycombe. The average age of residents in 1916 was 22: in 2016 it was 88. Staff in the Solihull home received a special recognition award at the Markel Third Sector Care Awards in December 2019.

In October 2019 Royal Star & Garter announced that it was to launch domiciliary care services, including bespoke residential services for younger disabled veterans.
