= Torishin =

Japanese restaurant in New York City, U.S.

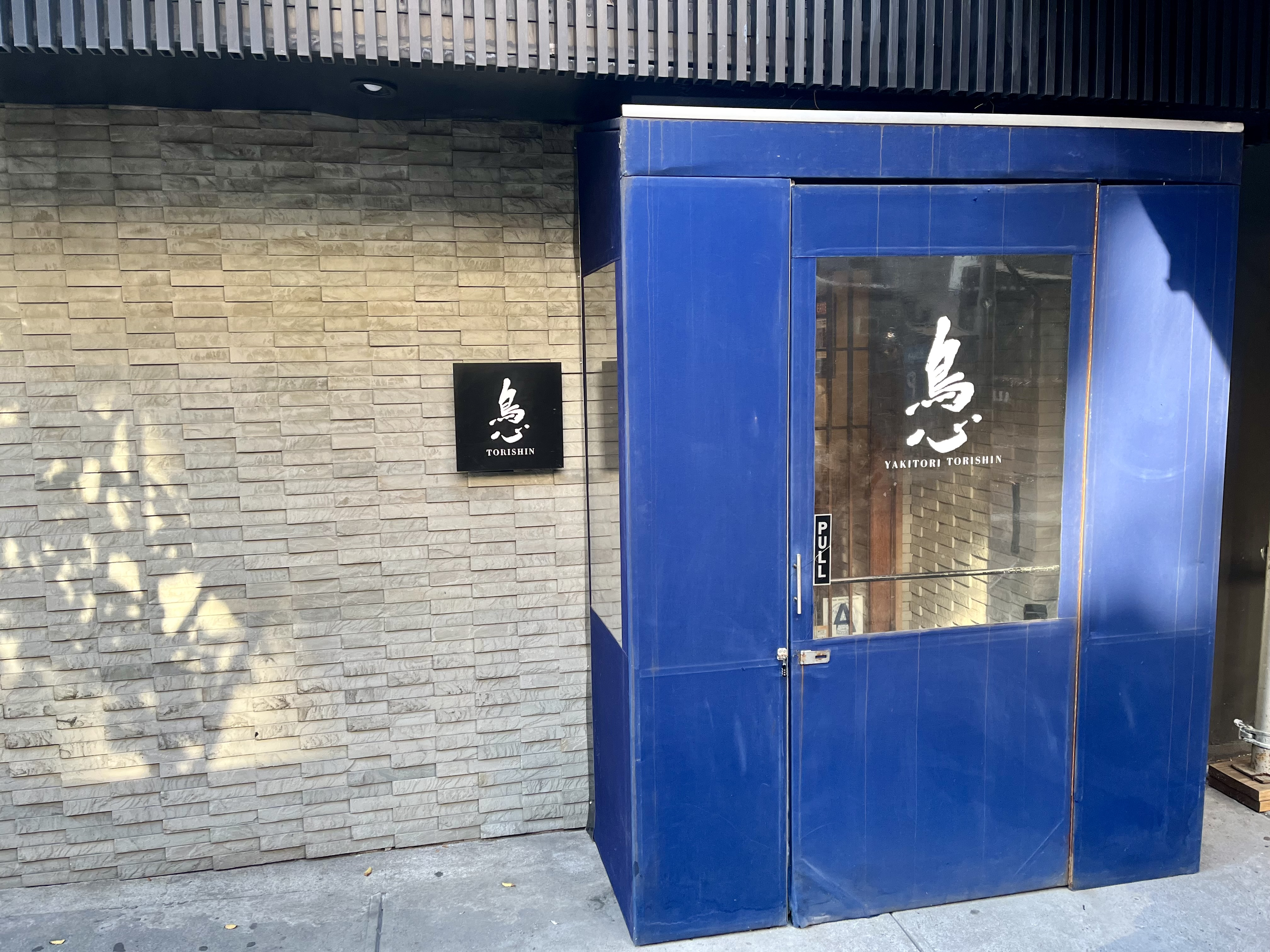
- Torishin in November 2023
- Interactive map of Torishin

Restaurant information
- Established: 2007
- Location: 362 West 53rd Street, New York City, New York, 10019, United States
- Coordinates: 40°45′54.3″N 73°59′13.8″W

Torishin is a Japanese restaurant in New York City. The restaurant has received a Michelin star.

== See also ==
- List of Japanese restaurants
- List of Michelin-starred restaurants in New York City
