= Yamaha Royal Star Venture =

Type of touring motorcycle

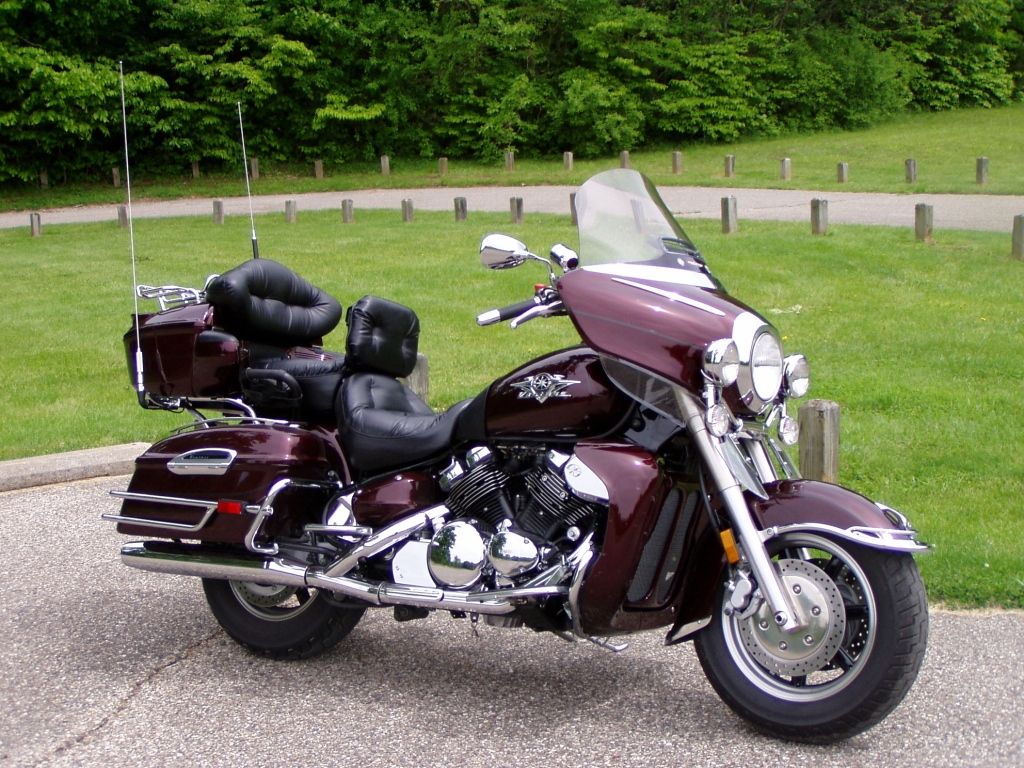
2006 Yamaha Royal Star Venture photographed at Turkey Run State Park, Indiana.

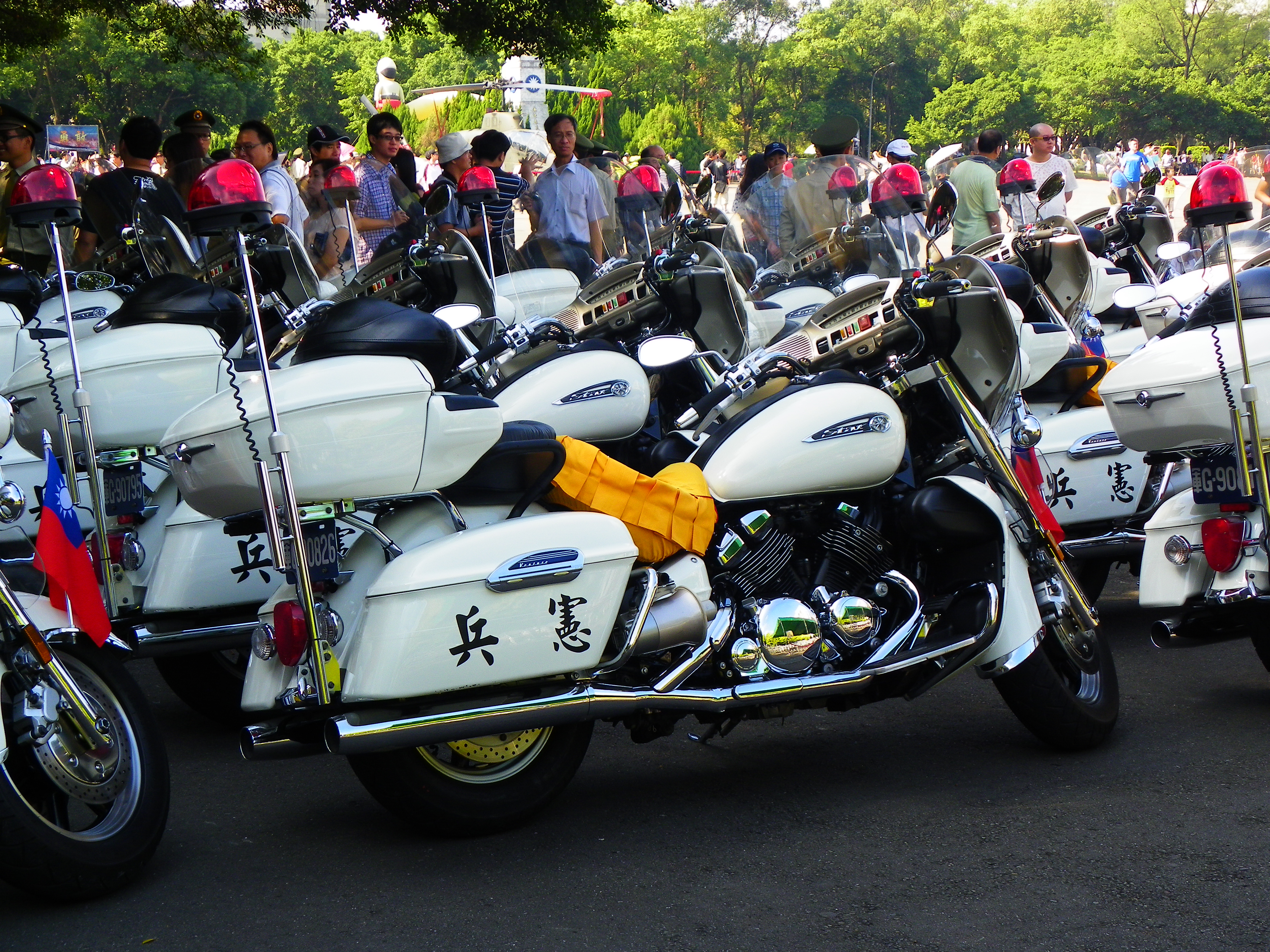
Yamaha Royal Star Venture of The Republic of China (Taiwan) Military Police Parked in Military Police School.

The Yamaha Royal Star Venture is a luxury touring motorcycle built by the Yamaha Motor Company. It is a premier touring motorcycle manufactured in two forms by Yamaha from 1983 to 1993 and from 1999 to 2013.

In 1983 Yamaha created a V4 engine that debuted in the Yamaha Venture motorcycle series. The first in the series was the Venture Royale produced from 1983 to 1993. Yamaha discontinued the design until 1996 when it resurrected the Venture engine and produced a cruiser-style motorcycle called the Royal Star that was produced until 2001. In 1999 Yamaha again brought out a large full touring motorcycle known as the Royal Star Venture, again using a variation of the Venture power package. In 2005 it introduced the Royal Star Tour Deluxe, which is the Royal Star Venture without the fairing, radios or trunk.

In 1985 Yamaha introduced the V-Max. The first generation V-Max engine was a modified version of the one used in the earlier 1198 cc version of the Venture Royale. The Vmax was equipped with the V-boost system that the Ventures never received reported to add a full 20 horsepower to the Vmax offering. The Vmax sold in the US was equipped with a lower geared drive unit as well which gave it better acceleration but made it a feel a little "busy" on the freeway. The Royale model is the Venture with additional accessories and weight.

The re-vamped, new look, Second Generation model was introduced in 1999 and was manufactured, largely unchanged, through the 2013 year model. Though Yamaha revived the Venture name that it used on the 1983 to 1993 Venture Royale models, the Royal Star Venture shares little with its predecessor except for the time-proven, liquid-cooled V4 engine and shaft drive. It departs from the earlier sport touring styling in favor of a classically styled touring look.

== Vehicle information ==
=== Appearance ===
There are two basic models: standard and S. The standard model has brushed front forks while the S model has chromed front forks. The two models also have different paint colors. Each year the standard model color has changed. Some years the S model has retained the same color, though always different from the standard model. This is most noted in the "Midnight" version of the S model that featured Raven (black with silver metallic) paint.

The 1999 and 2000 year models have different seat styles to the 2001 to current year models. The older seats were more firm than the newer "pillow top" seats. The older flat panel seats were used on the Midnight models with the addition of chrome studs along the sides. The seats on the Midnight model were changed to the unstudded pillow top design for the last half of 2006. This was the last year for the Midnight version of the S model.

=== Millennium Edition ===
In 2000 Yamaha produced the Millennium Edition Royal Star Venture. That 2000 year model color was Pearl White/Ivory two-tone with tan coloured seats. Only 1,500 of these were produced and a serial numbered placard was placed on the rear of the trunk.

=== Mechanical ===
The Royal Star Venture is a large motorcycle. Rider seat height is 29.5 inches (750 mm). It weighs 807 lb (366 kg) dry, which yields a weight of 869 lb (394 kg) with oil, coolant, and a full fuel tank. The Royal Star Venture has a 67.1-inch (1,700 mm) wheelbase. Among the standard features are a trunk-mounted CD player, a full AM/FM/tape stereo system with integrated CB (not available on Australian imports), and electronic cruise control. The bike's sound system consists of a four speaker, surround-sound stereo with two speakers mounted in the fairing and a further two mounted in the pillion back rest. Volume automatically increases or decreases once the bike is mobile in order to compensate for road noise. The shock absorbers are air adjustable for pre-load to compensate for different loads. The bike has a large trunk and side panniers, all lockable with the ignition key. Two helmet locks, one on either side beneath the trunk, are also secured by the ignition key. The seats are either traditional flat panel, or pillow top depending on the model and year.

The drive package on the Royal Star Venture includes a liquid-cooled 1,294 cc (79.0 cu in) (referred to as 1,300 cc) V4 engine fed by four carburetors - one per cylinder - primed by a manually operated push-pull choke. It has four valves per cylinder, overhead camshafts, and shim-over bucket valves. Bore x stroke is 79 mm × 66 mm (3.1 in × 2.6 in) with a compression ratio of 10:1. The five-speed, overdrive transmission is part of the engine case and the engine and transmission share the same oil. The drive shaft and final drive assembly are built into the left side of the double-sided swing arm. Swing arm motion is damped by a mono shock mounted in the center of the frame. The clutch is of the wet plate design and is hydraulically activated by the left hand lever. The gear selection lever is mounted on the left side and is the rocker (heel-and-toe) style, sitting above a spring-loaded, hinged foot board. The rear brake pedal on the opposite (right) side also sits above a spring-loaded, hinged foot board. There are foot boards fitted for the pillion passenger that are also hinged but not spring-loaded, so they can be upright when not in use or dropped to the horizontal position for riding.

The front brakes are two-piston design, while the single rear caliper houses four pistons. Both front brakes are activated by the right hand lever. The rear brake is activated by the foot pedal on the right.

A few minor changes have been made for the 2001 and later year models. The trunk bottom of the 1999 model had a tendency to crack, and the antennae could come loose and fall off. Both issues were fixed as warranty claims.

Shock absorber design was changed slightly in 2005 to incorporate an elevated vent tube to prevent oil loss in the event of a tip-over. The factory-fitted mono shock has three-way damping, using a combination of internal coil spring, air and hydraulic fluid (oil). Air pressure is used to adjust the mono shock depending on the load at any time. The mono shock is a sealed unit and not able to be repaired or re-built if it fails. Such failures after relatively low mileage were common-place in early years and were replaced under warranty. Third party, after-market replacement units are popular with owners despite the fact they are more expensive than original (OEM), as they are serviceable and can be re-built if necessary.

=== Dimensions ===
Overall length: 2,705 mm (106.5 in).

Overall width: 900 mm (35 in).

Overall height: 1,565 mm (61.6 in).

Seat height: 750 mm (30 in).

Wheelbase: 1,705 mm (67.1 in).

Ground clearance: 155 mm (6.1 in).

Minimum turning radius: 3,500 mm (140 in)

Weight, with oil and fuel: 394 kg (869 lb)

Fuel tank capacity: 22.5L (4.883 Imperial gallons. 5.94 US gallons).

Fuel reserve amount: 3.5L (0.769 Imperial gallons. 0.92 US gallons).

Radiator capacity (including all routes): 3.50L (3.079 Imperial quarts. 3.698 US quarts).

Coolant reservoir capacity: 0.84L (0.739 Imperial quarts. 0.887 US quarts).
