= Skutari =

Skutari may refer to:

- Shkodër, known as Scutari and Skutari in Italian and traditional English usage
- Skoutari (disambiguation)
- Scutari (disambiguation)
