= Elizabeth Evans =

Elizabeth or Liz Evans may refer to:

- Elizabeth Glendower Evans (1856–1937), American social reformer and suffragist
- Lizzie Evans (1864–1923), American entertainer
- Elizabeth Evans, inspiration for Dinah Morris
- Nerys Evans (born 1980), Plaid Cymru politician
- Elizabeth Evans (1887–1958), English actress better known as Elisabeth Risdon
- Liz Evans (politician), candidate in the 2017 Welsh Liberal Democrats leadership election
- Liz Evans (nurse) (born 1965), Canadian nurse and harm reduction pioneer
- Elizabeth Evans (1829–1914) unofficial Crimean War nurse.

== See also ==
- Evans (surname)
