= William Francis (chemist) =

British chemist

William Francis (16 February 1817 – 19 January 1904) was a British chemist, scientific author and publisher.

== Early life ==
He was born in London, the illegitimate son of Richard Taylor (1781–1858), an English naturalist and publisher of scientific journals, and Frances Marshall Francis (1797–1854). He attended University College School before studying abroad in France and Germany. After studying chemistry and biology at University of London he obtained a Ph.D at the University of Giessen in 1842 under Liebig.

== Career ==
He established and edited the Chemical Gazette from 1842 to 1859 when it merged with Chemical News. He edited the Philosophical Magazine from 1851 and the Annals and Magazine of Natural History from 1859. He translated and published many works on chemistry.

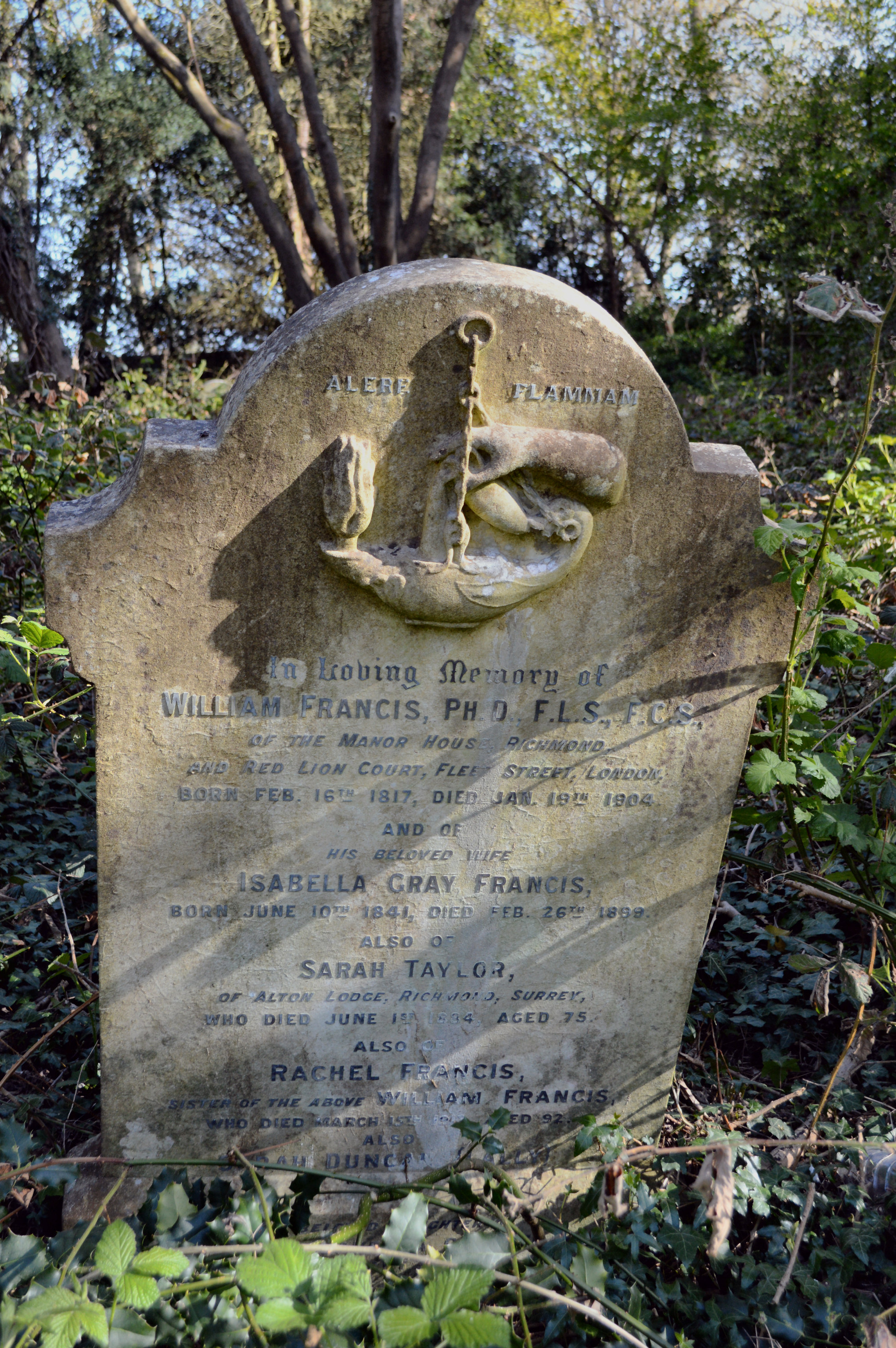
Francis's grave at Richmond Old Cemetery

In 1841 he was one of the original members of the Chemical Society. He was also a fellow of the Linnean Society of London, the Royal Astronomical Society and the Physical Society of London.

in 1852, together with Richard Taylor, he established Taylor & Francis as scientific publishers.

== Personal life ==
Francis and his family lived in Richmond. In 1862 he married Isabella Gray Taunton (1841–1899); their children born in Richmond were William (1864), Isabella (1868), Lucy (1872). He died at the Manor House, Sheen Road, Richmond and is buried in Richmond Old Cemetery.
