= Thomas Allistone =

English soldier who took part in the Charge of the Light Brigade

Thomas Allistone (or Allison), (13 June 1823 – 27 October 1896) was a soldier in the 11th Hussars who took part in the Charge of the Light Brigade.

== Early life ==
Allistone was born on 13 June 1823 at Worton Lane, Isleworth, and was baptised on 13 July. His parents were William and Elizabeth Allistone. His occupation before enlisting was recorded as a groom.

== Army career ==
He enlisted in the 11th Hussars on 25 April 1842 at Hampton Court and went on to serve over 16 years. In 1845 when they were based in Dundalk he deserted and spent 20 days in prison. In 1851 he was a Private (number 1128) at Pockthorpe cavalry barracks, Norwich. Their uniform consisted of a blue dolman (jacket), a pelisse, fur busby, a sky blue wool vest and crimson trousers with yellow stripes; they were sometimes known as the "Cherry Pickers".

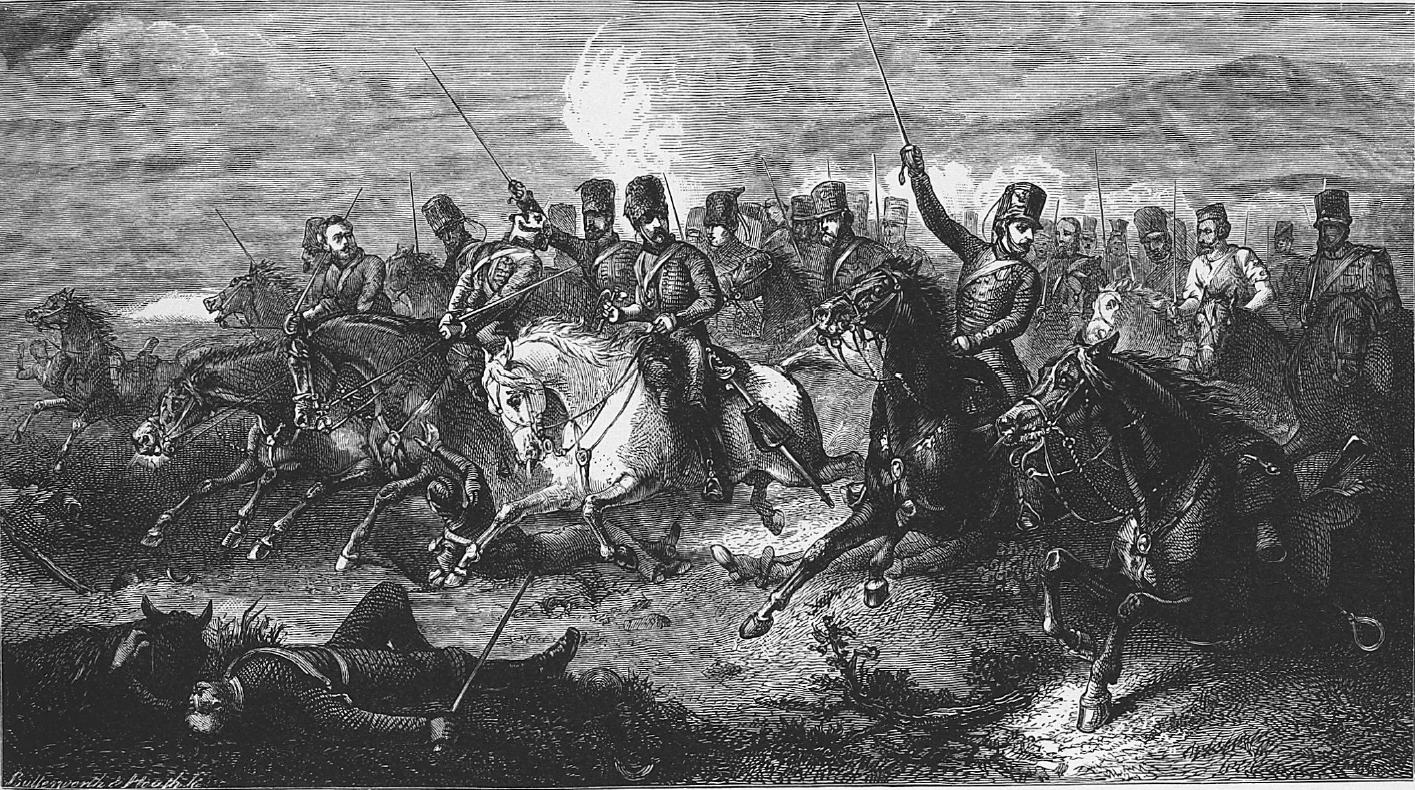
Return Through the Valley of Death by Thomas Jones Barker (1876)

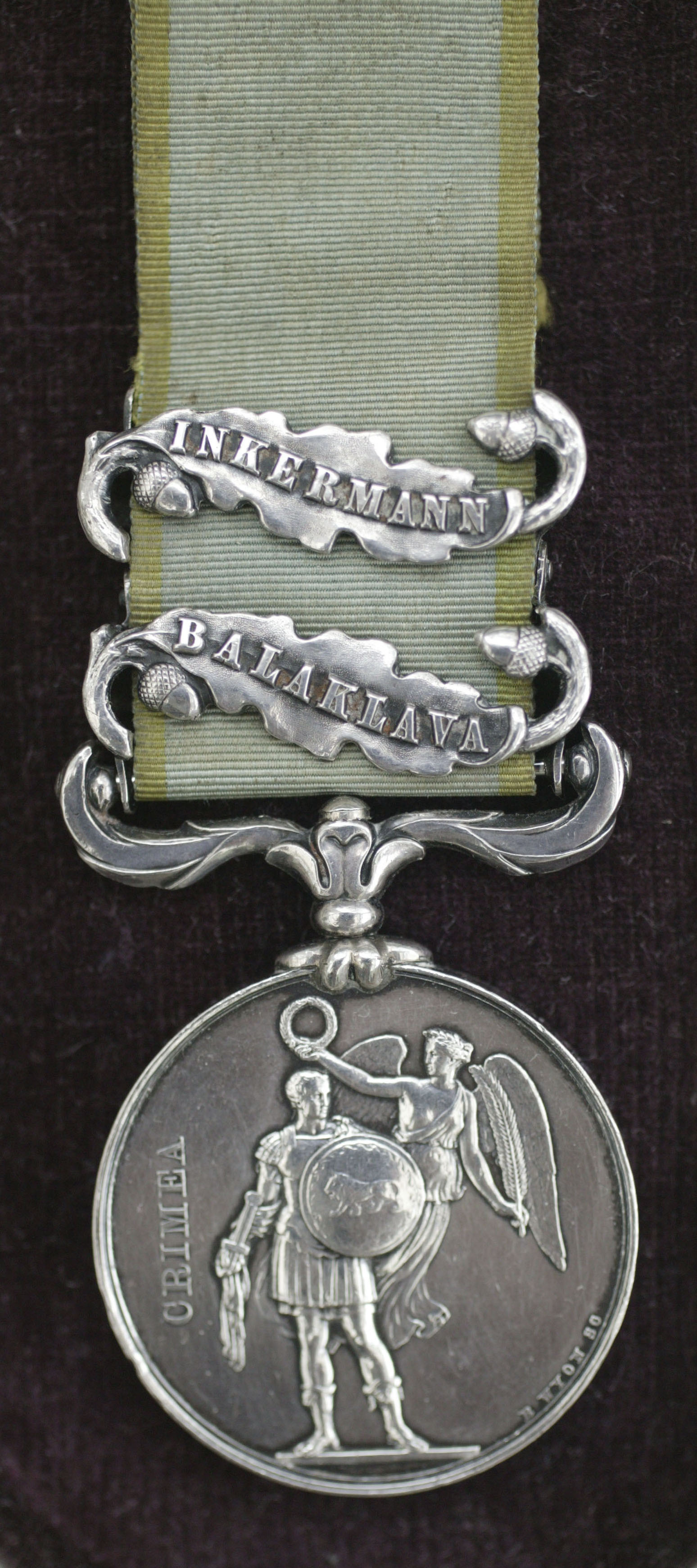
Crimean War Medal

The regiment arrived in Turkey in June 1854. On the muster roll he was recorded as Batman. On 25 October 1854 he took part in the Charge of the Light Brigade at the Battle of Balaclava in the Crimean War. He was one of only 18 survivors out of 200 in the 11th Hussars. "Only 18 of that regiment survived, and the deceased was one of them, coming out of the fray without a scratch." A narrative of the charge was made by Sergeant-Major G Loy Smith of the 11th Hussars. It was not until 14 November that The Times reported "The Cavalry Action at Balaclava 25 October".

He received two medals: the Crimean War Medal, with clasps for Alma, Balaclava, Inkerman and Sevastopol, and the Turkish Crimea Medal. In 1858 he was promoted to Corporal. He was discharged from the army in 23 December 1858 in Brighton at his own request, possibly because the regiment had been put in readiness to embark for India at the start of the Indian Mutiny. He left with two good conduct badges. He attended the 21st Anniversary Reunion dinner at Alexandra Palace on 25 October 1875. In 1877 he was a member of the Balaclava Commemoration Society.

Allistone is not listed as a confirmed Charger although he attended the 1875 banquet. After 1878 only those known to have actually engaged in the Charge were admitted for membership. There are no regimental records of who rode in the Charge and who did not because they were sick or on other duties. Only those who were killed or wounded, taken prisoner, documented as charging or were members of the Balaklava Commemoration Society after 1878 are recognised as Chargers by Brighton in his book "Hell Riders". Williams in "The Historical Records of the Eleventh Hussars" records that 110 were on parade, 85 were killed or missing and 25 survived. The total for the Light Brigade came to 607 and 409 killed or missing.

== Later career ==
After leaving the army he was recorded in 1861 as a coachman lodging in Vine Row, Richmond, with his wife Sarah.

He then spent 14 years as a warder at Millbank Prison; in 1871 he was living at 6 Cedar Terrace, Lambeth. From 1853 Millbank was a local prison becoming a military prison in 1870 and it ceased to be a prison by 1886.

Later he became a coachman for Mr Piggott in Richmond; in 1881 and 1886 was residing at White Lodge, Marshgate Road (now Sheen Road), Richmond. Sarah was then a housekeeper at 1, Pavilion Place, Turnham Green, Chiswick.

He and Sarah then lived at 1 Hickey's Almshouses, Richmond, where they both died.

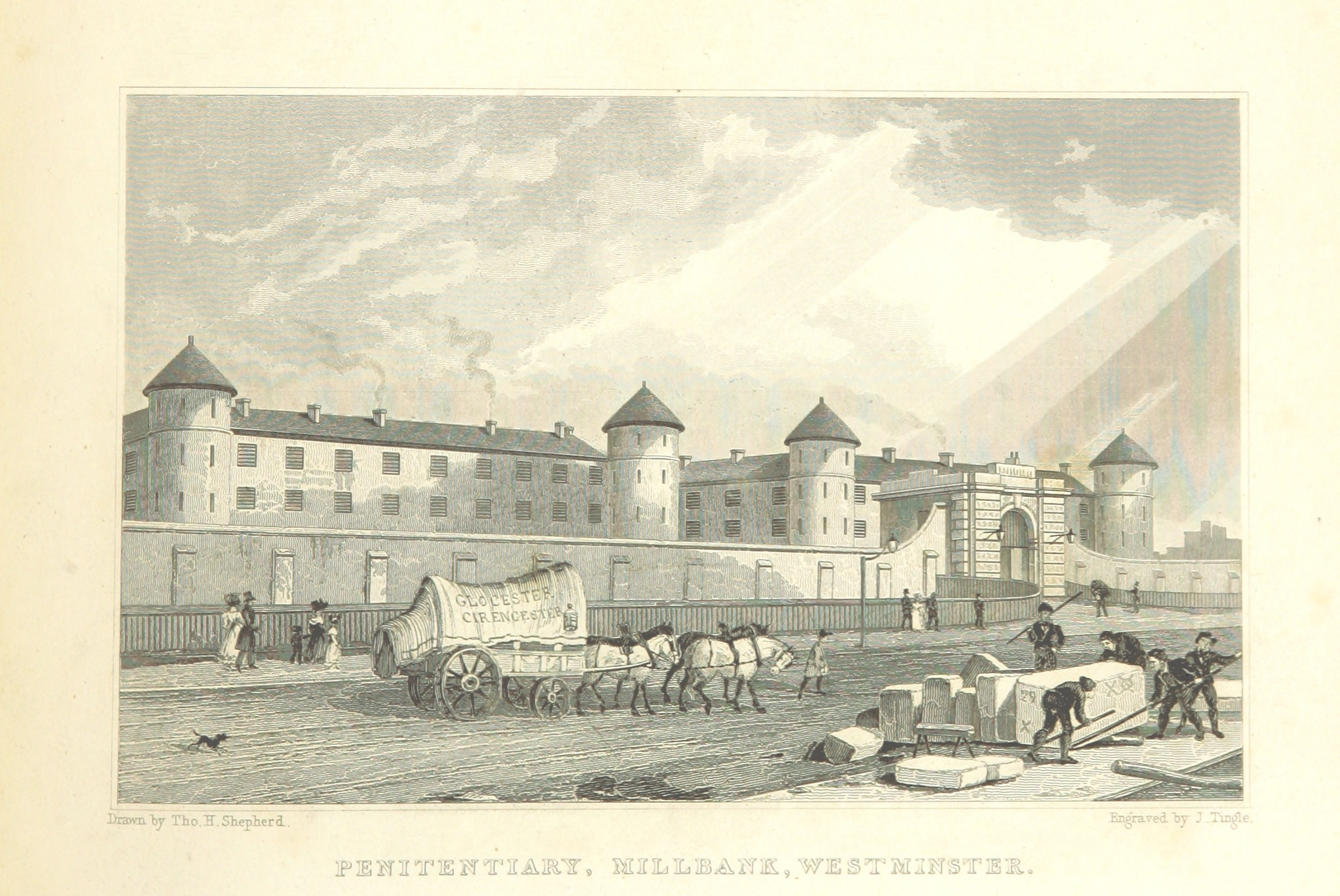
Millbank Prison

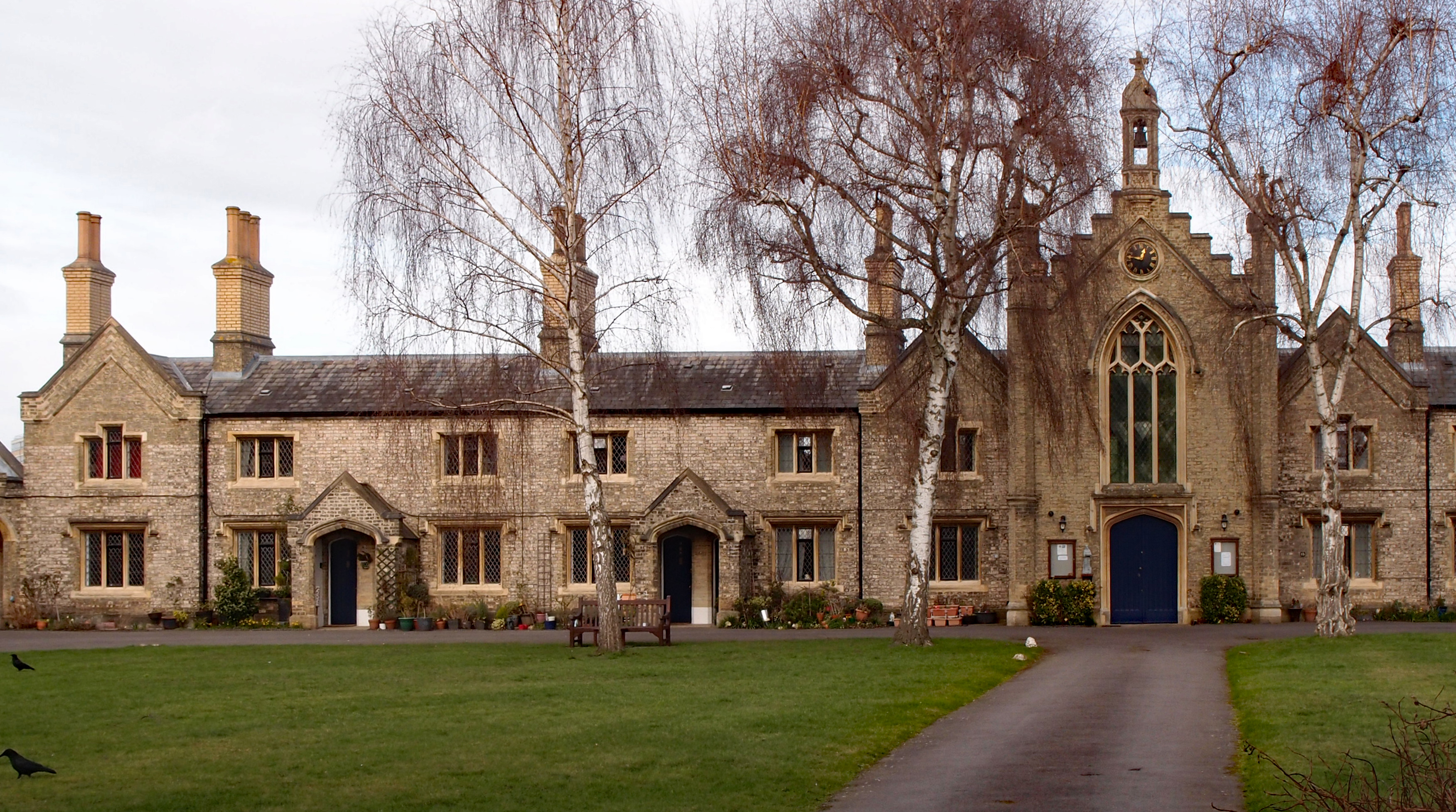
Hickey's Almshouses

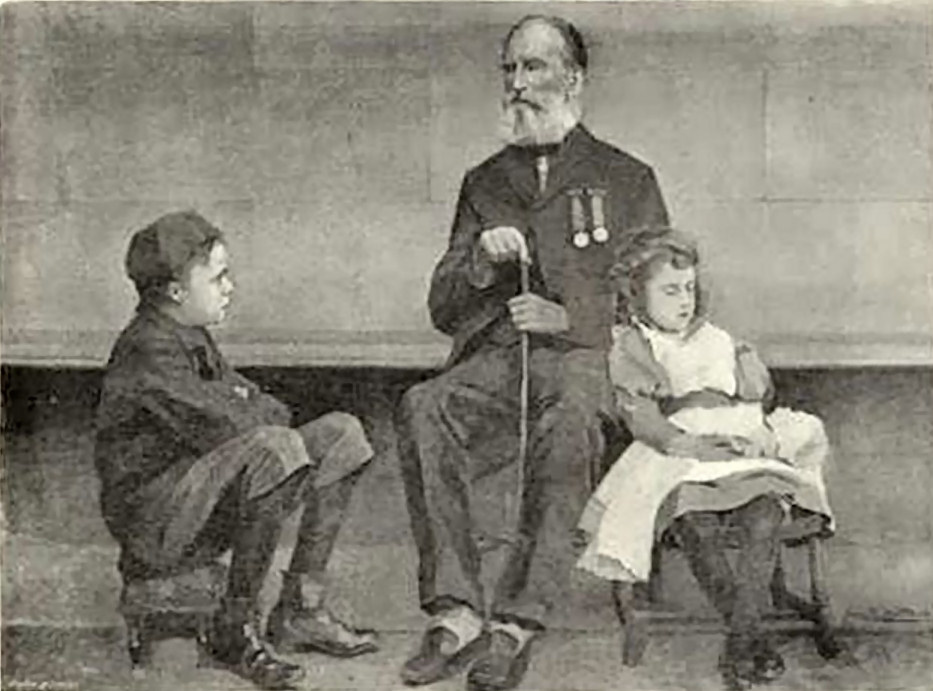
'The Story of Balaclava told by one of the survivors'

His portrait, entitled 'The Story of Balaclava told by one of the survivors (Thomas Allison)', was painted by Julia Beatrice Matthews (1862–1948) and was exhibited at the Royal Society of British Artists in 1894. The artist lived with her family in Richmond since at least 1881, exhibited from 1893 and later moved to Newlyn after her marriage.

== Personal life ==
He married Sarah Wilton (b c1814, Isleworth) on 16 December 1856 at Hounslow Parish Church. The 11th had returned from Crimea in June that year. They were both residing in Hounslow at the time, possibly at the Cavalry Barracks, Hounslow. The regiment was then based in Canterbury but moved to Hounslow in March 1857. His wife died September 1892 and was buried in Richmond Old Burial Ground.

Allistone died from the 'decay of old age' on 27 October 1896, at Hickey's Almshouses; Charlotte Durham, his niece, was present and registered his death.

== Funeral ==
The funeral service took place at Hickey's Almshouses chapel attended by the inmates. His coffin was then given a military funeral and carried by six members of the Scots Greys from Hounslow and placed on a gun-carriage, covered with the Union Jack, his medals and wreaths. The funeral was attended by Sir Charles and Lady Rugge-Price; he was Deputy Lieutenant for Surrey and a Justice of the Peace. Allistone was buried in a common grave in Richmond Cemetery.
