= Richmond Cemetery =

Cemetery in London

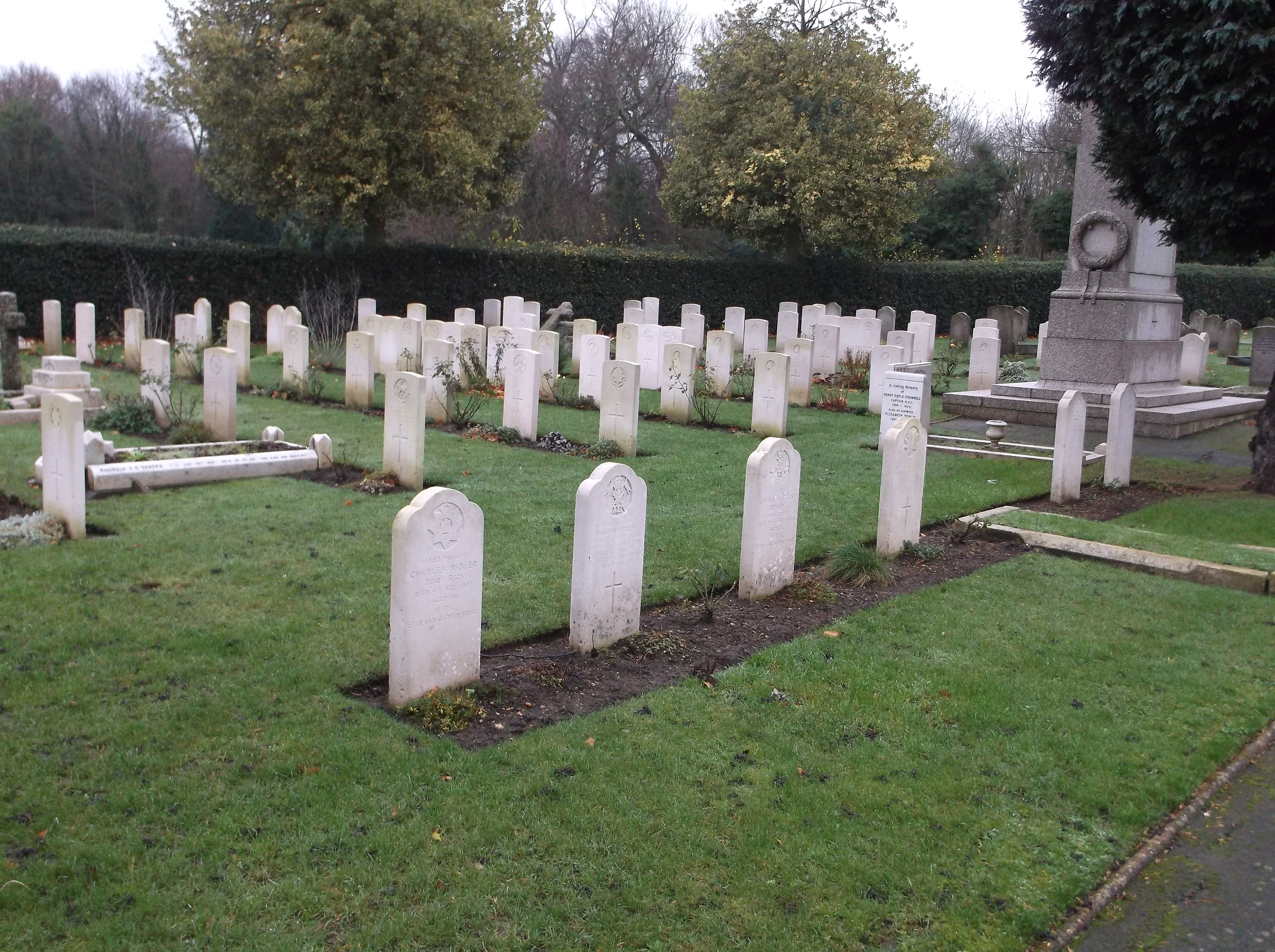
- War graves and the South African War Memorial in Richmond Cemetery
- Interactive map of Richmond Cemetery

Details
- Established: 1786
- Location: Richmond, London, TW10
- Country: England
- Coordinates: 51.4553°N 0.2884°W
- Type: Active
- Owned by: Richmond upon Thames London Borough Council
- Size: 15 acres (6.1 ha)
- Website: Richmond Cemetery

Richmond Cemetery is a cemetery on Lower Grove Road in Richmond in the London Borough of Richmond upon Thames, England. It opened in 1786 on a plot of land granted by an Act of Parliament the previous year. The cemetery has been expanded several times and now occupies a 15-acre (6-hectare) site which, prior to the expansion of London, was a rural area of Surrey. It is bounded to the east by Richmond Park and to the north by East Sheen Cemetery, with which it is now contiguous and whose chapel is used for services by both cemeteries. Richmond cemetery originally contained two chapels—one Anglican and one Nonconformist—both built in the Gothic Revival style. The former Nonconformist chapel, now privately owned, falls outside the cemetery's walls after a redrawing of its boundaries. The former Anglican chapel is now known as Grove Gardens Chapel and is in the care of Habitats & Heritage.

Many prominent people are buried in the cemetery, as are 39 soldiers who died at the South African Hospital in Richmond Park during the First World War and many ex-servicemen from the nearby Royal Star and Garter Home. These residents are commemorated by the Bromhead Memorial, which lists the names of those who are not commemorated elsewhere, while the South African soldiers are commemorated by a cenotaph designed by Sir Edwin Lutyens, derived from his design of the Cenotaph on Whitehall in central London. The war graves and the cenotaph are the responsibility of the Commonwealth War Graves Commission.

== History and setting ==
The cemetery was founded following the Richmond: Poor Relief, etc. Act 1785 (25 Geo.3 c.41), which granted Pesthouse Common, formerly owned by King George III, to Richmond vestry. A plot of 1.5 acres (0.6 hectares) was enclosed for a burial ground; a workhouse was also provided. The site was originally a simple square plot divided into four by footpaths; between 1865 and 1879, the cemetery expanded and subsumed the land between the original site and the workhouse, which was laid out in a grid format, and by 1894 the cemetery had further expanded onto a plot of land to the north, also in a grid layout. The cemetery now occupies an area of 15 acres (6 hectares), ten times its original size. In 1873 the local vicar built a wall to divide the consecrated ground (for Church of England devotees) from the unconsecrated ground (for Nonconformists and non-believers), but the move met with consternation in the local community and the wall was found torn down one morning. The vicar offered a reward for information as to the identities of the culprits but was apparently unsuccessful. There was never any attempt to rebuild the wall.

The original plot contains many mature trees, including yews, cypresses, and several palm trees. Prior to the expansion of London, the site was originally in a rural and picturesque location, comparable to a smaller-scale Highgate Cemetery, and retains its rural feel today; author Darren Beach describes it as having "a decidedly rural feel", while historian Hugh Meller calls it "an unusually rural cemetery which in spring simulates a country churchyard".

To the east of the cemetery is Richmond Park, the two sites separated only by a five-metre (sixteen-foot, six-inch) strip of land known as the Freebord or "deer leap", owned by the Crown to protect the park's boundaries and allow access to the exterior of the wall for inspection and repair. Just to the north is East Sheen Cemetery. The two cemeteries are today joined, forming a contiguous area of graves, though the original boundary is still denoted by a holly hedge.

The cemetery enjoys protected status as a result of designation as Metropolitan Open Land and (jointly with East Sheen Cemetery and Pesthouse Common) as a conservation area.

=== Chapels ===
Richmond Cemetery originally contained two chapels, one of Church of England denomination and one for Nonconformists, both built in the Gothic Revival style. The Church of England chapel (shown as "Richmond Community Chapel" on Richmond Council's map of Richmond and East Sheen Cemeteries) was built in 1875 to a design by Sir Arthur Blomfield and is a Grade II listed building. It is constructed predominantly of Kentish ragstone with Bath stone embellishments. The front of the building has a buttressed arch above the main door, which bears the inscription "In the Garden was a new sepulchre, there laid they Jesus". Above the door are three lancet arches, and in the apex is a large wheel window. The roof is tiled, with the remains of a flèche evident. The chapel fell into disrepair, requiring restoration in the 1990s. It is now known as Grove Gardens Chapel and is in the care of Habitats & Heritage. The Nonconformist chapel, to the north of the Anglican chapel, was sold in 1992 and was also restored in the 1990s. Its design is unusual for an English cemetery chapel, featuring significant plate tracery and decorative sculpture, but the architect is unknown. After a redrawing of the cemetery's boundary, it now stands outside the gates on Grove Road.

The chapel in East Sheen Cemetery is now also used for services for Richmond Cemetery. Both cemeteries are now administered and maintained by Richmond upon Thames London Borough Council.

=== Richmond Old Burial Ground ===
Beyond the former Anglican chapel are old burial grounds that are now closed. The area called "Richmond Old Burial Ground" covers about four acres. It was first opened for burials in 1856, and most burials there took place between then and the First World War. The cemetery list contains details of over 12,000 burials, many without headstones. Volunteers have now photographed and recorded the inscriptions, where they are decipherable, on more than 1000 graves, recording the deaths of over 2000 people.

== Memorials ==
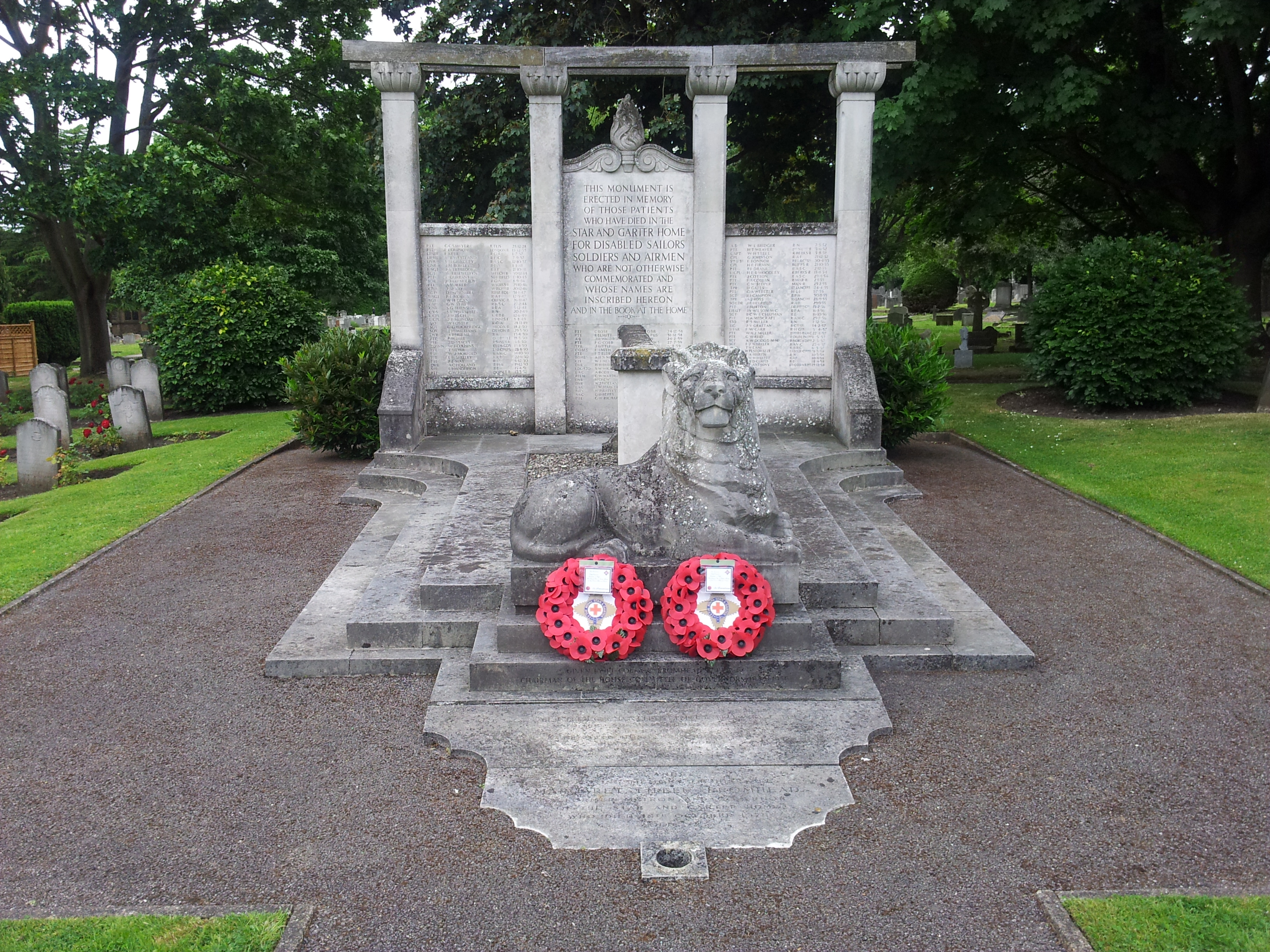
The Bromhead Memorial

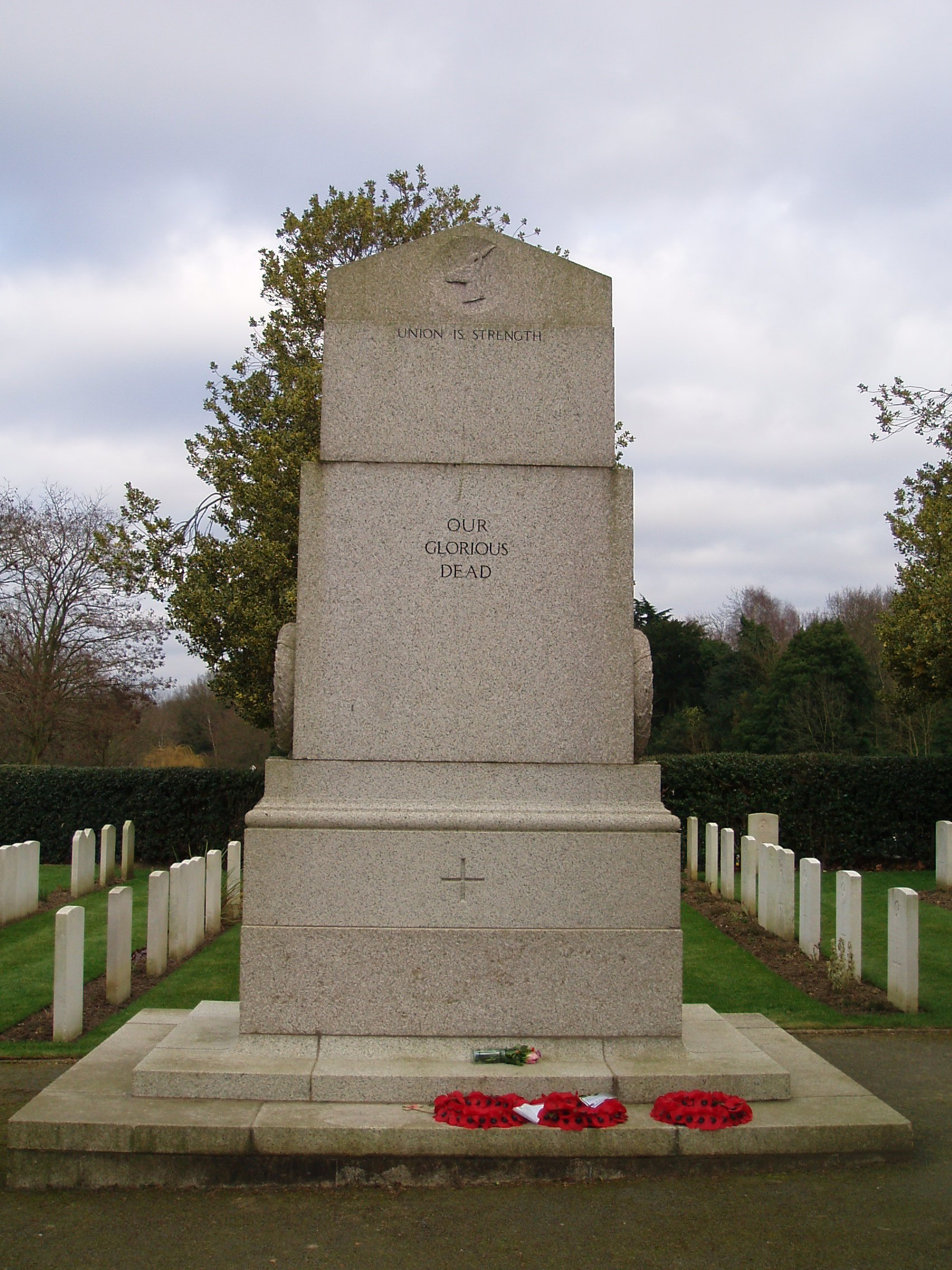
Lutyens' South African Memorial among the war graves

Richmond Cemetery contains several significant memorials, including a granite tomb belonging to wood-engraver and illustrator William Harvey (1796–1866), originally set at a steep angle but since subsided, which is decorated by an incised palette in pink granite. The Prendergast family are commemorated by two crosses featuring floral-themed engravings. According to Historic England, "Richmond Cemetery is unusually endowed with war memorials and war graves". A significant number of recipients of the Victoria Cross—Britain's highest military honour for gallantry—are buried there.

=== Bromhead Memorial and Royal Star and Garter Home graves ===
Two sections of the cemetery are dedicated to deceased residents of the Royal Star and Garter Home in Richmond. One is denoted by the Bromhead Memorial while the other—opened in 1994—is marked with a Christian cross by a local stonemason. Both plots contain standardised gravestones and do not allow personalised memorials.

The Bromhead Memorial is a large monument close to the boundary with East Sheen Cemetery. Dedicated to Lieutenant Colonel Alfred Charles Bromhead and his wife Margaret, former governors of the home, it takes the form of a triptych with stone panels, in front of which is a low spine wall; both the spine walls and the panels in the triptych are engraved with the names of deceased ex-servicemen from the home who are not commemorated elsewhere. The whole memorial is set on a stone base with three steps, and at the very front is a sculpture of a seated lion. It was designed by Cecil Thomas and was unveiled in 1957 as a gift from the governor of the home in a ceremony presided over by Field Marshal Lord Alanbrooke and the Bishop of Southwark. It is a Grade II listed building.

=== South African War Memorial and war graves ===
Another section is given over to war graves commemorating 39 soldiers who died at the South African Hospital which operated in Richmond Park during, and immediately after, the First World War; the section is marked by a Cross of Sacrifice and a cenotaph (the South African War Memorial). The cenotaph was designed by Sir Edwin Lutyens and is a Grade II listed building. The design is derived from the Cenotaph on Whitehall, the most famous of Lutyens' memorials in Britain and the most influential on other First World War memorials. It is of coarse granite construction, with a springbok inscribed in the apex of the front and rear while the sides both carry a carved stone wreath; the only text inscribed on the monument are the phrases "union is strength" and "our glorious dead" on the front, and the same text translated into Dutch on the rear. The memorial was unveiled by South African General Jan Smuts on 30 June 1921. The cenotaph became a focus for commemorations in the 1920s and 1930s, after which it appears to have been forgotten and was neglected until 1981 when the CWGC became aware of it and agreed with the South African government to take responsibility for its upkeep.

The war graves section is cared for by the Commonwealth War Graves Commission (CWGC) on behalf of the South African government. There are a total 178 Commonwealth service personnel from both World Wars buried in this cemetery.

== Notable burials ==
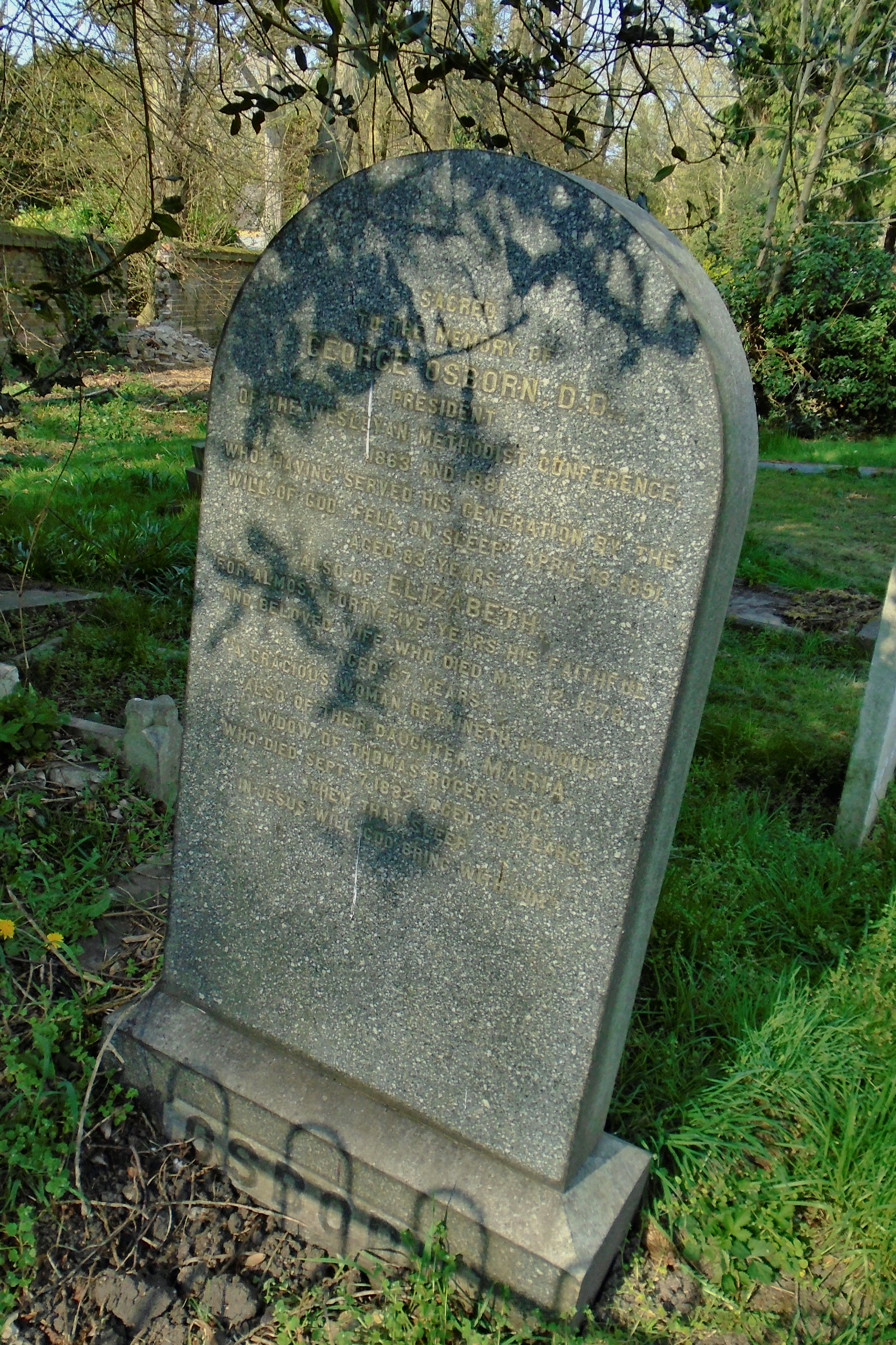
George Osborn's grave

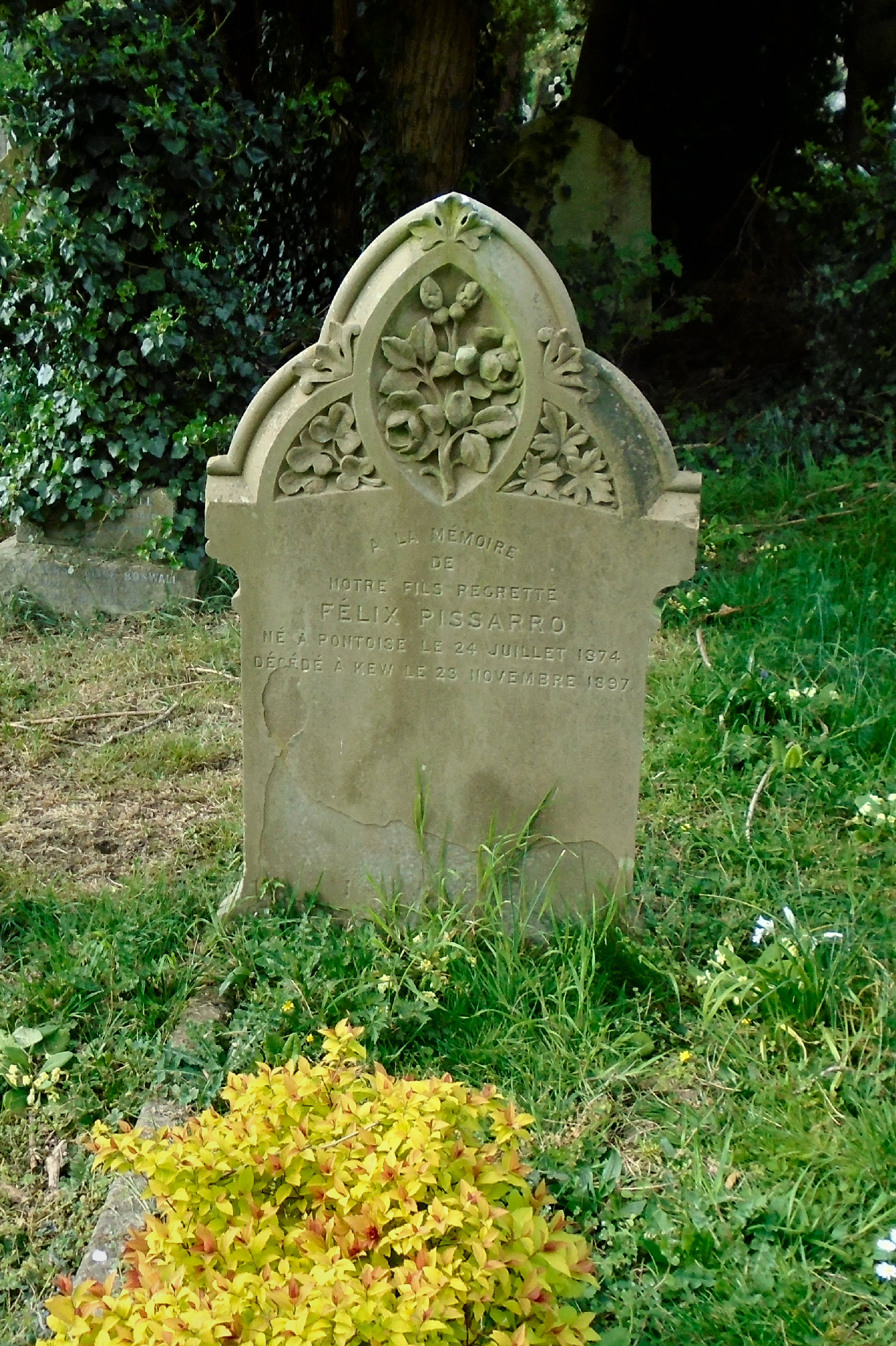
Félix Pissarro's grave

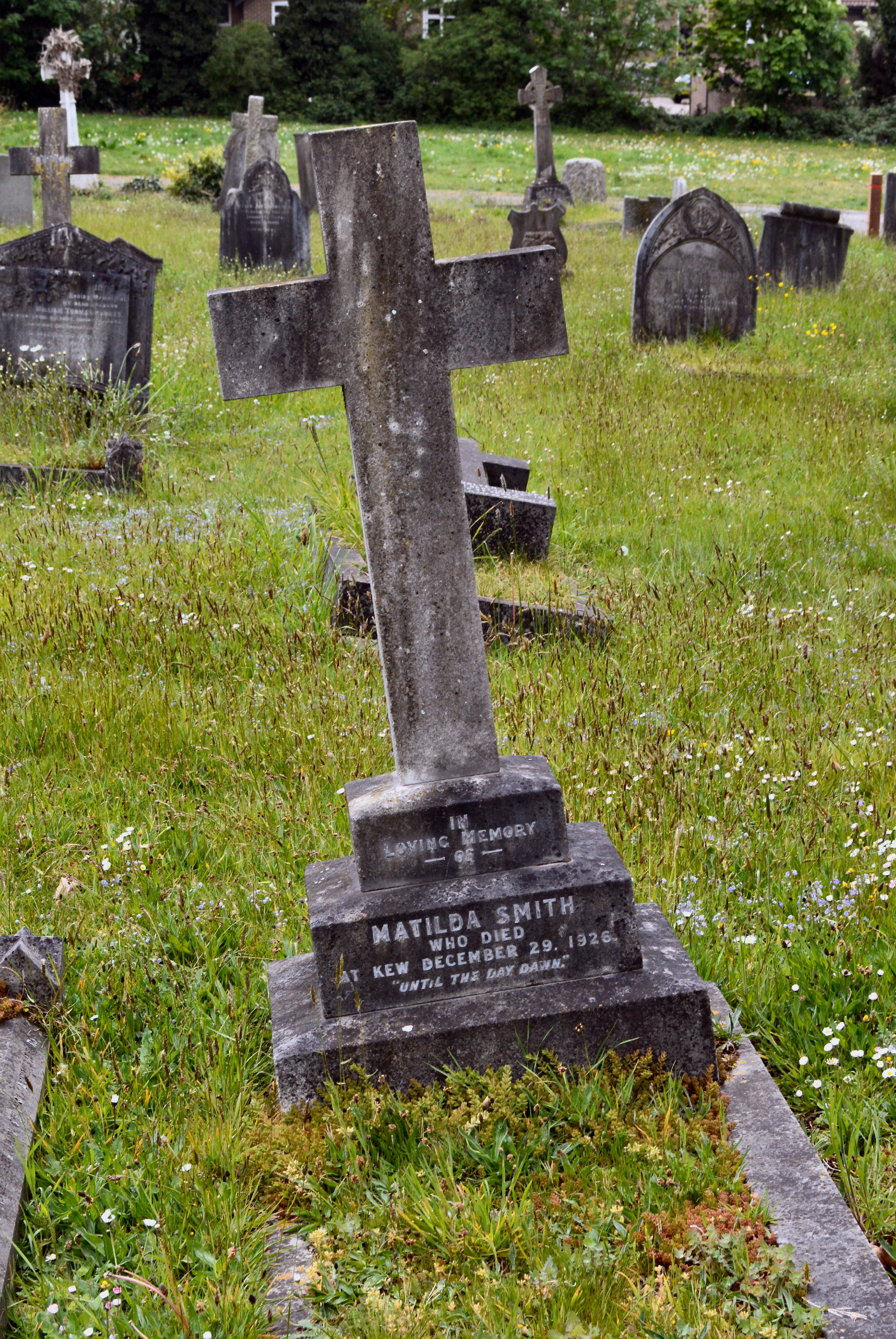
Matilda Smith's grave

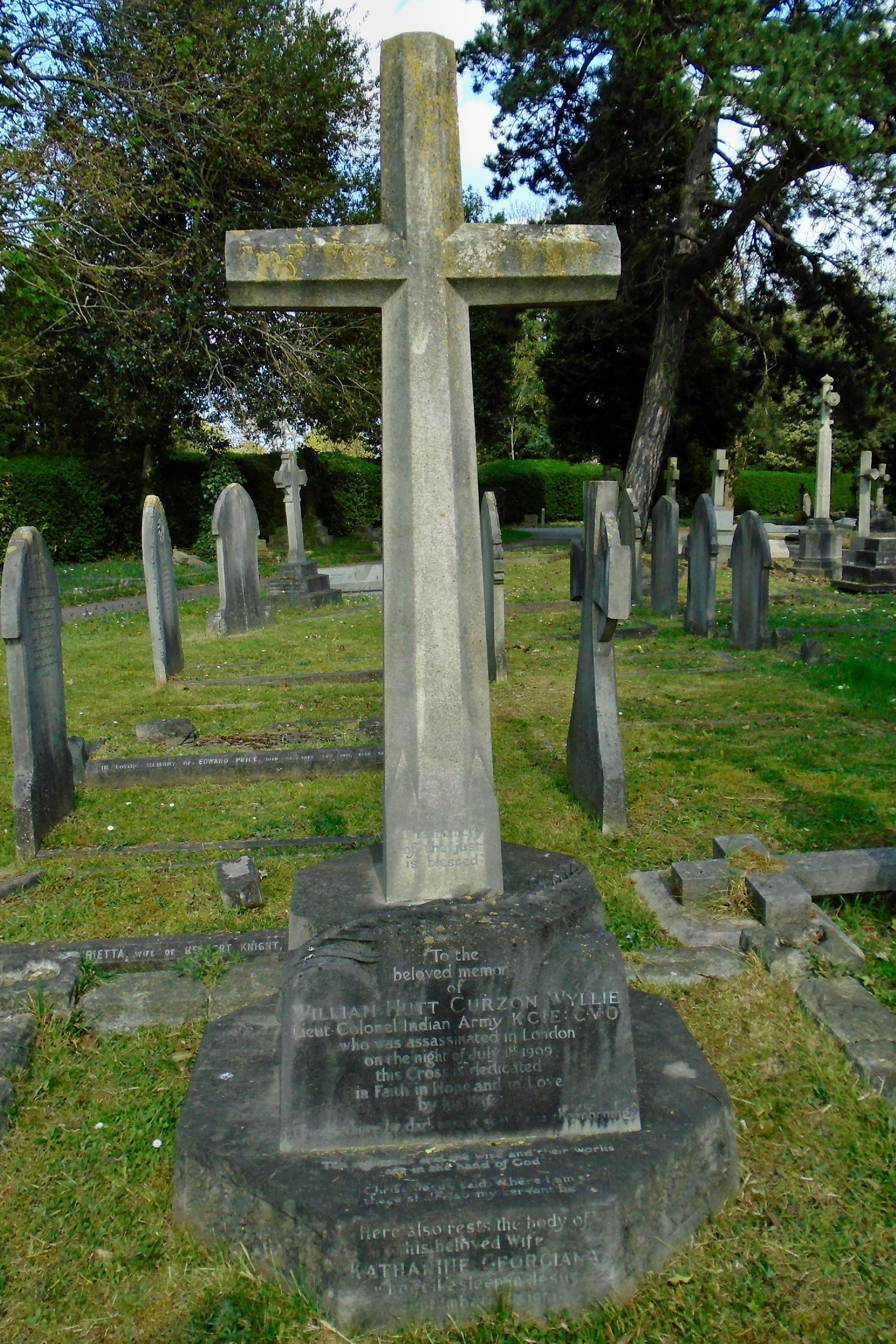
Curzon Wyllie's grave

Notable people buried in Richmond Cemetery include:

=== 19th-century burials ===
- Thomas Allistone (1823–1896), soldier in the 11th Hussars who took part in the Charge of the Light Brigade
- Frances Browne (1816–1879), Irish poet and novelist, best remembered for her collection of short stories for children, Granny's Wonderful Chair
- Sir David Scott Dodgson (1821–1898) of the Bengal Army who took part in the relief of Lucknow and was author of Views of Lucknow (1860)
- Walter Hood Fitch (1817–1892), botanical illustrator
- George Julian Harney (1817–1897), political activist, journalist, and Chartist leader who was also associated with Marxism, socialism, and universal suffrage
- William Harvey (1796–1866), wood-engraver and illustrator
- George Hilditch (1803–1857) and his brother Richard H. Hilditch (1804–1873), pupils of the Twickenham landscape artist Thomas Hofland who carried on his tradition of landscape painting around Richmond and Twickenham. Richard lived at Cholmondeley Cottage (3 Cholmondeley Walk). The Orleans House art collection has 15 of George's paintings. Richard's painting 'Kew Gardens from Richmond Hill' is in the Tate Gallery.
- Thomas Jackson (1783–1873), Wesleyan minister and writer who acted as chair of divinity of the Richmond Theological College and president of the Methodist Conference during the mid-nineteenth century
- Julius Jeffreys (1800–1877), surgeon and writer, who invented the respirator and was a pioneer in the development of early air conditioning systems
- George Osborn (1808–1891), Wesleyan Methodist minister, who was President of the Methodist Conference in 1863 and in 1881
- Félix Pissarro (1874–1897), French painter, etcher and caricaturist. His father was the painter Camille Pissarro.
- William Christian Sellé (1813–1898), doctor of music, composer and for forty years Musician in Ordinary to Queen Victoria
- Admiral Robert Fanshawe Stopford (1811–1891), Royal Navy officer who went on to be Commander-in-Chief, Channel Squadron
- George Powell Thomas (1808–1857), soldier, artist and poet, who died at the Battle of Agra during the Indian Rebellion of 1857, and is commemorated on the family tomb
- George Mathews Whipple (1842–1893), physicist who was superintendent of the Kew Observatory from 1876

=== 20th-century burials ===
- Mary Elizabeth Braddon (1835–1915), popular novelist of the Victorian era. She is best known for her 1862 sensation novel Lady Audley's Secret.
- Sir Charles Burt (1832–1913), solicitor, who was elected to the first Surrey County Council in 1889 and served as Mayor of Richmond in 1892–93. As a member of the Richmond Vestry he campaigned to stop the Southwark and Vauxhall Waterworks Company discharging waste water into the Thames at Richmond. He assisted in protecting the view from Richmond Hill with the passing of the Richmond, Petersham and Ham Open Spaces Act 1902, and in the purchase of Marble Hill.
- Albert Chancellor (1842–1911), auctioneer and local politician who was mayor in 1897 and 1902; father of the author Edwin Beresford Chancellor
- Arthur Herbert Church (1834–1915), chemist, expert on pottery, stones and chemistry of paintings, who discovered turacin in 1869 and several minerals, including the only British cerium mineral. He was also a talented artist and worked as a professor of chemistry at the Agricultural College in Cirencester and then at the Royal Academy of Arts.
- Sir Frederick Cook, 2nd Baronet (1844–1920), businessman and Conservative MP
- William Grant Craib (1882–1933), botanist, Professor of Botany at Aberdeen University, who worked at the Royal Botanic Gardens, Kew
- Denis Cussen (1901–1980), Ireland international rugby player and Olympian, who was one of the founders of the British Association of Sport and Medicine
- Frederick Jeremiah Edwards (1894–1964), Victoria Cross recipient, who died at the Royal Star and Garter Home in Richmond
- Elizabeth Evans (1829–1914) provided a rare female eyewitness account of the front lines of the Crimean War when she accompanied her husband to the Crimea.
- William Francis (1817–1904), scientific author, who lived at the Manor House, Richmond
- Charles Garvice (1850–1920), prolific British writer of over 150 romance novels, who also used the pseudonym Caroline Hart
- Lord Claud Hamilton (1843–1925), Member of Parliament and a noted railway director
- Harry Hampton (1870–1922), VC recipient, who was born in Richmond and died in Twickenham. For over 50 years his grave remained unmarked. In 1986 the location of the grave was re-discovered by Ron Buddle, a Metropolitan Police officer and Victoria Cross historian who, with financial assistance from the King's Regiment Association, erected the present headstone. The grave was restored in 2008 as part of the London Borough of Richmond upon Thames' "Adopt a Grave" scheme.
- Sir Charles Henry Hawtrey (1858–1923), actor, director, producer and manager
- James Bracebridge Hilditch (1843–1921) Mayor of Richmond (1899–1900), son of artist George Hilditch
- George Andrew Hobson (1854–1917), civil engineer who designed the Victoria Falls Bridge
- Louis Honig (1849–1906), composer and pianist who lived in Richmond
- Arthur Hughes (1832–1915), painter and illustrator associated with the Pre-Raphaelite Brotherhood
- Arthur Lewis Jenkins (1892–1917), First World War pilot and poet, who is buried next to his sister, Elinor May Jenkins (1893–1920), who was also a poet
- Harriet Kendall (1857–1933), singer, elocutionist and composer of ballads, who studied at the Royal Academy of Music and the Guildhall School and lived at Elsinore, Park Road, East Twickenham
- Joseph Mears (1871–1935), businessman, who co-founded Chelsea Football Club and was Mayor of Richmond from 1931 to 1932
- William McMillan (1887–1977), Scottish sculptor
- Sir William Olpherts (1822–1902), general and VC recipient
- Natalie Opperman (1904–1988), the first woman Chairman and later President of St Dunstan's, who was awarded the Star of South Africa by the South African government in 1982
- Sir Andrzej Panufnik (1914–1991), Polish-born composer and conductor
- Sir Harry Prendergast (1834–1913), general and VC recipient
- Keith Relf (1943–1976), lead singer with the Yardbirds
- Tom Richardson (1870–1912), cricketer who, in the 1963 edition of Wisden Cricketers' Almanack, was selected by Neville Cardus as one of the Six Giants of the Wisden Century
- Sir Dudley Ridout (1866–1941), major general in the Royal Engineers
- Robert Allen Rolfe (1855–1921), botanist specialising in the study of orchids
- Matilda Smith (1854–1926), botanical artist whose work appeared in Curtis's Botanical Magazine and who was the first official artist of the Royal Botanic Gardens at Kew
- Thomas Walls Stephens (1848–1930), ship owner, member of Lloyds and mayor of Richmond who lived at Downe House
- Leslie Stuart (born Thomas Augustine Barrett; 1863–1928), composer of Edwardian musical comedy
- Montague Summers (1880–1948), author and self-styled clergyman. He is known primarily for his scholarly work on the English drama of the 17th century, as well as for his idiosyncratic studies on witchcraft, vampires, and werewolves, in all of which he professed to believe.

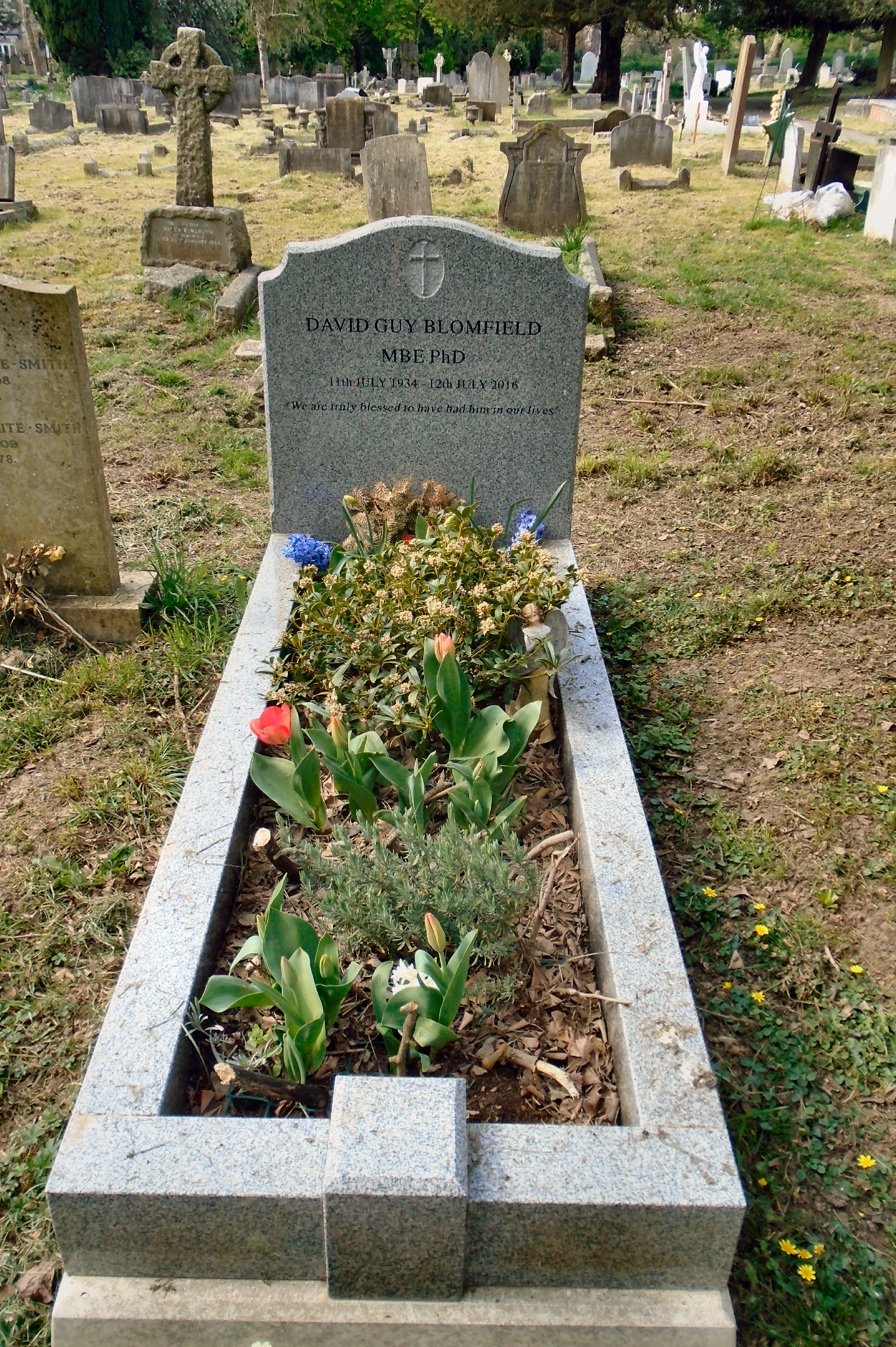
David Blomfield's grave

- Sir James Szlumper (1834–1926), civil engineer and twice Mayor of the Municipal Borough of Richmond. He was also a major benefactor of Darell Road School in Kew and was, for many years, president and patron of the Victoria Working Men's Club in Kew.
- General Sir Henry Landor Thuillier (1813–1906), Surveyor General of India, who was responsible for the printing of the first postage stamps valid throughout India
- Max Waechter (1837–1924), German-born businessman, art collector, philanthropist and advocate of a federal Europe, who lived in Terrace House on Richmond Hill and held the post of High Sheriff of Surrey in 1902
- Andrew Watson (1856–1921), the first black person to play association football at international level
- Elizabeth Whipple (c. 1846–1927), pioneering British astronomical photographer
- William Hutt Curzon Wyllie (1848–1909), Lieutenant Colonel in the British Indian Army, and later the political aide-de-camp to the Secretary of State for India, Lord George Hamilton. He was assassinated in London by the Indian revolutionary Madan Lal Dhingra.

=== 21st-century burials ===
- David Blomfield (1934–2016), leader of the Liberal Party group on Richmond upon Thames Council, writer, book editor and local historian

== See also ==
- Bromhead Memorial
- East Sheen Cemetery
- Grove Gardens Chapel
- List of cemeteries in London
- South African War Memorial, Richmond Cemetery
