= Harriet Kendall =

British female poet (1857–1933)

Harriet Kendall (1857, Bowness-on-Windermere, Westmorland– 16 September 1933 Eastbourne, Sussex) was a singer, elocutionist, pianist, poet and composer of ballads, who studied at the Royal Academy of Music.

== Early life ==
She was born in Bowness-on-Windermere in April 1857; her parents were George and Ellen Kendall, living at Belmont House, Bowness.

She entered the Royal Academy of Music in 1876 where she trained under Manuel García and developed a contralto voice. As an elocutionist, she studied under Walter Lacy and Geneviève Ward.

== Career ==
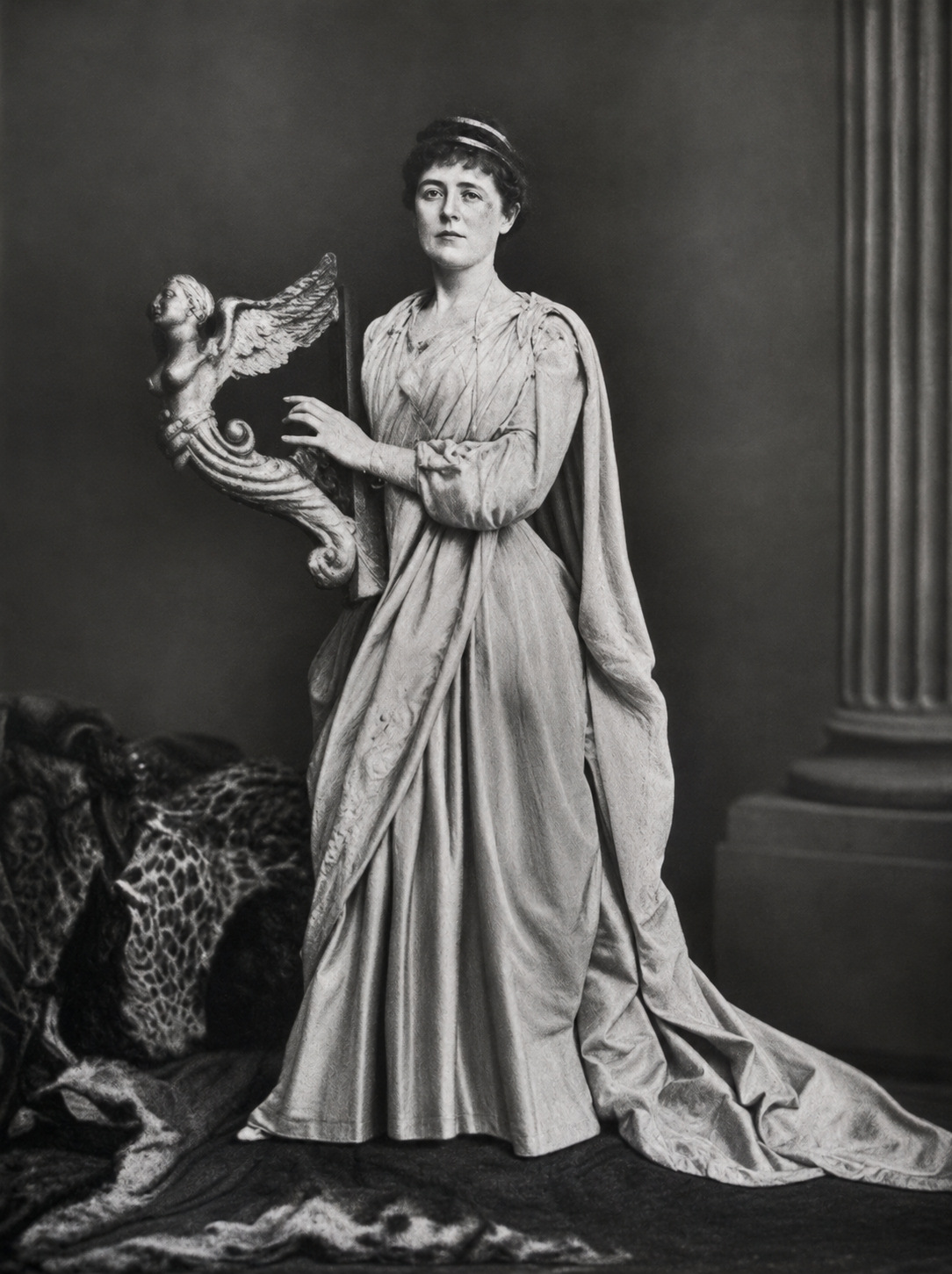
Harriet Kendall (1896)

She was an Associate of the Royal Academy of Music, A.R.A.M., awarded in 1932, and an Associate the Royal College of Music, A.R.C.M., awarded in 1893 for an external diploma in singing teaching. She achieved the Licentiate of the Royal Academy of Music, L.R.A.M., in singing performance in 1893. She was also a member of the Incorporated Society of Musicians, and elected a member of the Royal Society of Literature in 1930.

She was lecturer in Elocution at King's College, Ladies Department and had also been teaching music at the High School, Park Road, St Margarets.

Her first dramatic recital was given at Prince's Hall, Piccadilly, on 14 May 1887. She performed dramatic and musical recitals at the Queen's Hall, Prince's Hall, Royal Albert Hall, St James's Hall, and in the provinces. She composed her own songs, such as the ballads 'A Game of Tennis' (1886) and 'Richmond Park'. 'A Song of Remembrance' (1892) used Christina Rossetti's poem 'Remember'.

She acted in "A Midsummer Night's Dream" at the Royalty Theatre in a production by Mrs Fairfax, a pseudonym used by Emily Ernst Bell (1840-1893), who taught elocution at the Royal Albert Hall. Later she performed scenes from Shakespeare's plays and for Shakespeare's birthday celebration in 1930 part of her poem on Shakespeare - "We who are forever debtors bring our homage to thy immortality" - was placed on the official wreath that was laid on Shakespeare's tomb.

She advocated the setting up of examination standards for elocution and was supported by Dr Wace, Principal of King's College, London, from 1883 to 1897.

== Poetry ==
Her book, A Lakeland Story was published in 1888 and her book of poems, 'Synariss, and Other Poems for Recitation', was published in 1894.

Her poems were published in newspapers and magazines. Her poem 'An incident in the marriage market of Babylon' was published in 1890.

=== A Wayside Shrine (An Incident in Flanders, 1917) ===
One sunny day,
Far from the battle's roar, some children strayed,
In the deep meadow grass and laughed and played,
As little children may.

But suddenly
A blue-eyed maiden saw a wayside shrine,
The Cross, the form of Him, and with a sign
She murmured plaintively,

"Our Father," while
The tiny hands pressed tightly to her breast,
As if to still the heart in its unrest;
Then, with a wistful smile,

"Forgive us—our Trespasses" — the tears fell fast — "as we" —
The little breast heaved like the summer sea —
"As we" — in vain the power
To speak again.

Just then a noble form knelt at the shrine,
A tender voice spoke low, "Father divine,
Our loss shall be our gain.

"Forgive them, Lord,
That trespass against us"; and the little child,
Knelt by the King, who took her hand and smiled.
God's sunlight on them poured.

=== Life Pictures ===
A glow at morn:
The rose half tempted in blooming red:
Bright hopes just born
That ere the eve, must shed
Their petals, though we never deem them dead.

A warmth at noon,
Full-souled and odorous; and life all fair
As summer moon,
When stars lace beams as rare
As laughter which hath not behind some care.

A rest at eve: The ardor and the heat of day is o’er.
Hope can deceive
No longer: life no more
Can weave romances from a poet's lore.

A hush at night:
We fold our wings as birds that seek the nest.
Earth is bedight
With rose no more. The zest
Of life sinks with the sunlight in the west.

It is no dream,
No castle-building time, that we call life;
To catch the gleam
Of heaven in the strife,
Our toil must tend to reach the better life.

There is much room
For gratitude, much room for tenderness
In all the gloom
Of sorrow, much to bless.
If we will labor more, and murmer less.

Let us not turn
To seek in clouds our happiness, but try
Each day to learn
That near home blessings lie.
Those die to live who first have lived to die.

=== Look Up ===
Look up, look up, lest thou perchance shouldst miss
The glory of the heavens: the noonday sun.
The star-world o’er thy head, the tender kiss
Of dawn, the majesty of day begun.

Look up with new resolve for other sake
Than just thine own. Climb up the mountain steep,
Hard-breathing in the wind, that some may take
Fresh heart from thee ere eyes be closed in sleep.

Look up! for brave endeavour God doth call,
Life is too short for anything but love;
And His great truth for ever for us all
Shall light the weary road, heaven’s arch above.

Look up, to give to life a nobler worth,
And speak high words of cheer when thou shalt find
One chance to be an angel on the earth,
A benediction to thy suffering kind.

Look up! What matter if with empty hands
Thou comest? — if thou foldest them to pray
Thou givest much to Him who understands
Life’s mystery of pain from day to day.

Look up with fearless front, erect o’er strife.
Though dark the night and winterly the day.
Courage, oh, toiler! let the door of life
Stand open wide for Christ to come that way.

=== Give ===
Give of they best.
Truth, honor, love, unfailing sympathy,
God has bestowed His richest gifts on thee!
Do thou the rest.

Give of thy truth,
And, truth will answer thee. Set high this crown
Upon thy life, that nought shall drag it down
To dust forsooth.

Give honor, too.
And, honor will come back to thee again,
Increased a hundredfold, through strife and
And much ado.

Give of thy love,
And love will ope the gate of Paradise.
So shalt thou reach, through human sacrifice,
The life above.

Give sympathy,
To ease some aching heart with heavy load,
And help to bear the Cross upon the road
To Calvary.

== Personal life ==
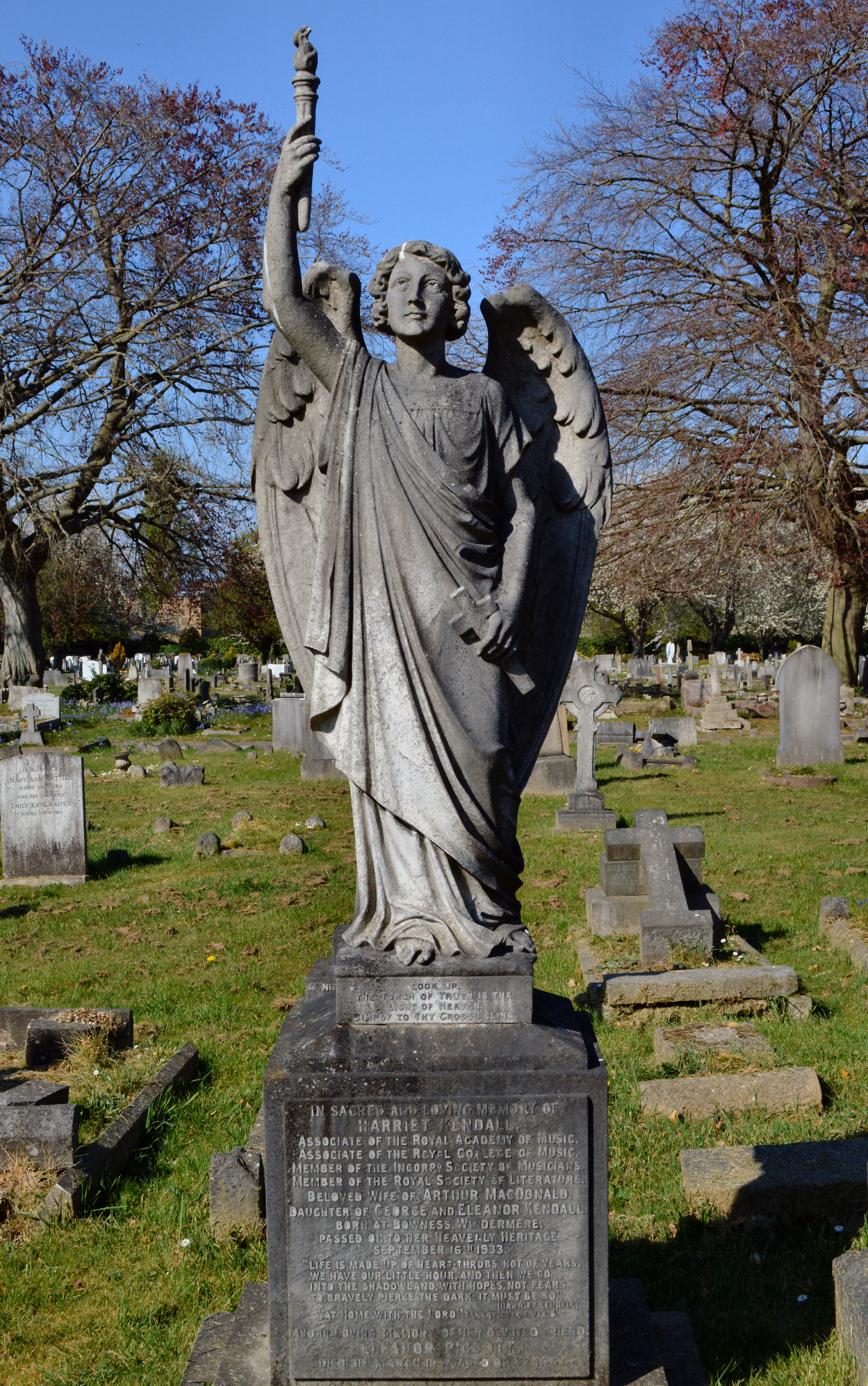
Richmond Cemetery

She lived at Elsinore, 8 Park Road, St Margarets, East Twickenham, for almost 50 years with her friend Miss Eleanor Piggott and they travelled widely in Europe together; Eleanor (b 1855) was the daughter of Frederick Piggott, auctioneer in George Street, Richmond. Dr Wace officiated at her marriage to Arthur MacDonald (1861–1951), a surveyor in Tring, at St George's, Hanover Square, London, on 4 September 1912. In 1921 she was living with her husband at Hazely, Tring, giving her age as 50. She died in a nursing home in Eastbourne, 16 September 1933, and was buried in Richmond Cemetery.

On her grave is her poem

"Life is made up of heart throbs, not of years,

We have our little hour, and then we go

Into the shadowland, with hopes, not fears,

To bravely pierce the dark, it must be so."

On her grave stands an angel holding a torch with the words "Look Up. The torch of truth is the Light of Heaven. Simply to thy Cross I cling."

She left her husband an income in her will until he remarried and the remainder to her friend, Eleanor Piggott, who died on 31 March 1937 and is buried in the same grave.

== Legacy ==
She founded a Harriet Kendall prize, a gold medal for elocution. Prizes were awarded from 1934 to 1962.

== Books ==
A Lakeland Story. (1888). Illustrated by Tom Taylor, Alfred Woodruff. London: J. Walker & Co.

Synariss, and Other Poems for Recitation. (1894). London: Simpkin, Marshall, Hamilton, Kent & Co.

== External sites ==
- Digital Victorian Periodical Poetry, Harriet Kendall
- Compositions by: Kendall, Harriet. International Music Score Library Project (IMSLP)
- British Library scores
- Synariss, and Other Poems for Recitation at Google Books
