= Bromhead Memorial =

Memorial in Richmond Cemetery, London

- United Kingdom
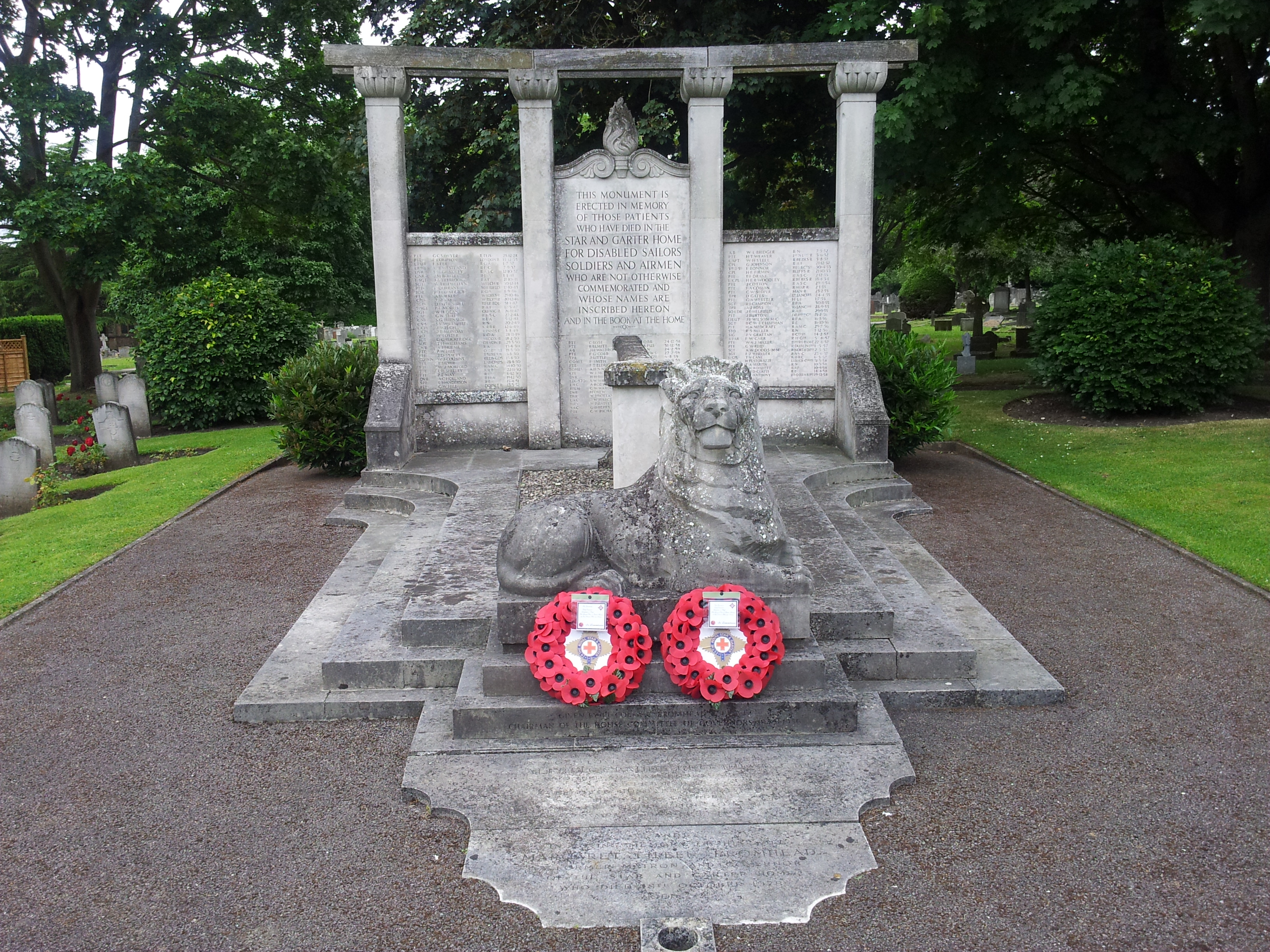
- For deceased residents of the Royal Star and Garter Home not commemorated elsewhere
- Unveiled: 1957
- Location: 51.4553229°N 0.2884192°W; Richmond Cemetery, Grove Road, Richmond, London
- Designed by: Cecil Thomas
- THIS MONUMENT IS ERECTED IN MEMORY OF THOSE PATIENTS WHO HAVE DIED IN THE STAR AND GARTER HOME FOR DISABLED SAILORS SOLDIERS AND AIRMEN WHO ARE NOT OTHERWISE COMMEMORATED AND WHOSE NAMES ARE INSCRIBED HEREON AND IN THE BOOK AT THE HOME

Listed Building – Grade II
- Official name: Bromhead Memorial
- Designated: 11 September 2012
- Reference no.: 1409405

The Bromhead Memorial is a memorial and Grade II listed building in Richmond Cemetery in the London Borough of Richmond upon Thames. It denotes a plot in the cemetery in which deceased residents of the nearby Royal Star and Garter Home are buried, and lists the names of those who are not commemorated elsewhere.

== History ==
The Royal Star and Garter Home in Richmond was built on a site granted by Queen Mary for the establishment of a home to care for invalided ex-servicemen; the home was originally established in the former Star and Garter Hotel. The Star and Garter Society became an independent charity in 1922 and shortly thereafter decided that the hotel was unsuitable for the needs of the residents. It was demolished, and the purpose-built home was built on the same site, which was opened in 1924 by Queen Mary and King George V. The society operated the home from that site from its opening until 2013, when it moved to new premises. The nearby Richmond Cemetery contains two sections dedicated to former residents of the Star and Garter Home, one of which is marked by the Bromhead Memorial. In these sections, only a standard headstone is permitted, similar to those placed by the Commonwealth War Graves Commission.

The memorial was commissioned as a gift from the Bromhead family in the name of Lieutenant Colonel Alfred Bromhead—who served as a governor of the Star and Garter home—and his wife Margaret, who was also a governor and the home's matron. It was designed by Cecil Thomas, FRBS and unveiled at a ceremony in October 1957 presided over by Field Marshal Alanbrooke—the chairman of the Star and Garter Home. It was dedicated by the Bishop of Southwark.

== Design ==
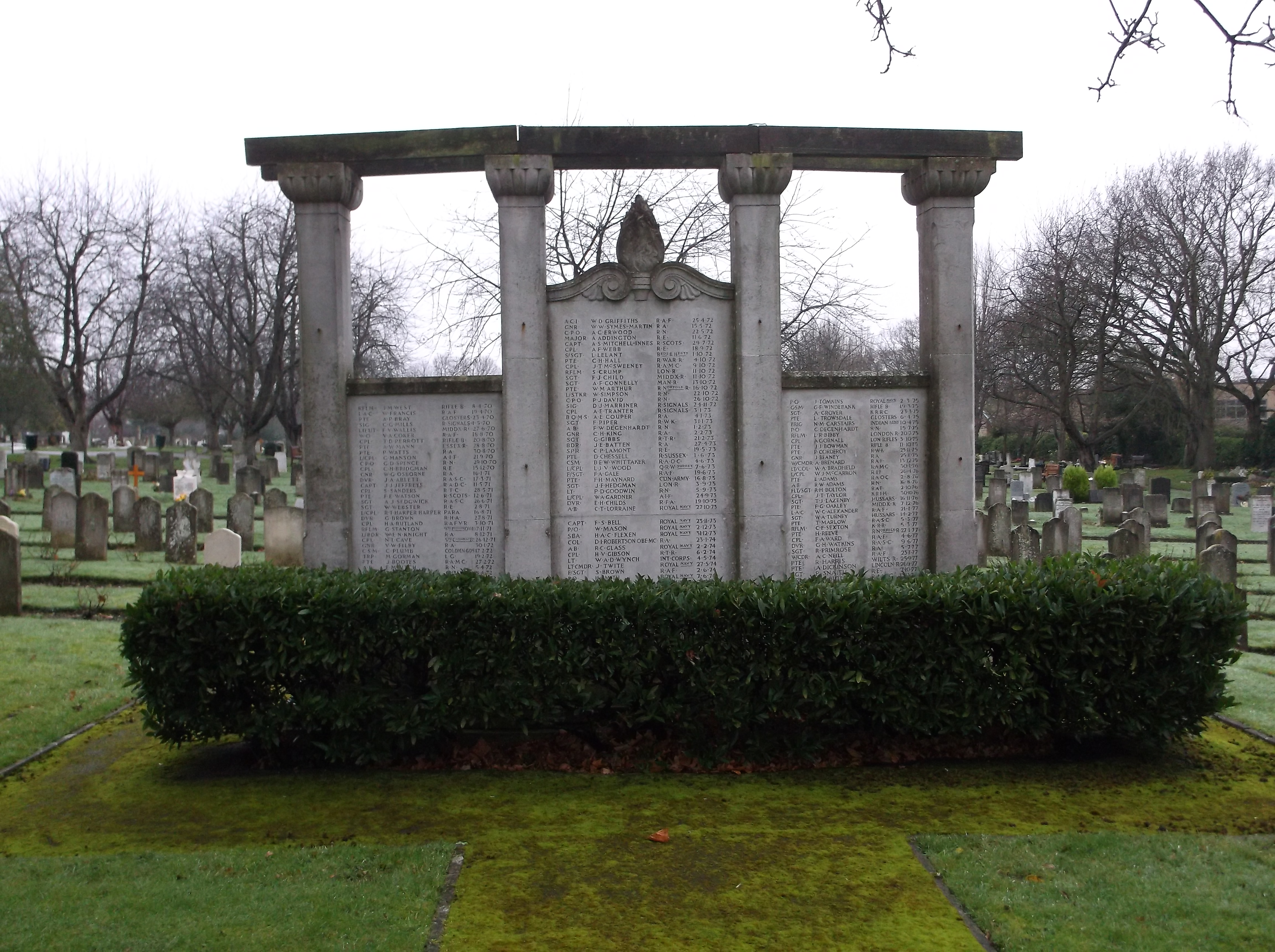
The rear of the triptych

Described by Darren Beach as "probably the finest sight at Richmond Cemetery", the memorial is of Portland stone construction in a classical style. It is one of two large memorials in the northern section of the cemetery—the other being the South African War Memorial, a cenotaph by Sir Edwin Lutyens commemorating South African soldiers from the First World War. The Bromhead Memorial takes the form of a triptych and a perpendicular low spine wall, in front of which is a sculpture of a lion. The triptych is supported by carved stone buttress walls which protrude to the front and rear, and is topped by timber lintels which extend slightly beyond the columns. The whole memorial is set on a stone base with three shallow steps. Between the pillars of the triptych are stone panels on the front and rear of which are engraved the names of those commemorated; the central panel is topped with a finial in the form of a lighted torch, below which is the inscription "THIS MONUMENT IS ERECTED IN MEMORY OF THOSE PATIENTS WHO HAVE DIED IN THE STAR AND GARTER HOME FOR DISABLED SAILORS SOLDIERS AND AIRMEN WHO ARE NOT OTHERWISE COMMEMORATED AND WHOSE NAMES ARE INSCRIBED HEREON AND IN THE BOOK AT THE HOME". The spine wall is also inscribed with names. The memorial lists a total of 307 names, laid out in chronological order from 1928 to 1977, starting from the front of the left-hand panel of the triptych and proceeding right across the front of the triptych, then to the spine wall (starting on the left-hand side), and concluding on the rear of the triptych.

The riser of the bottom step at the front of the memorial bears the inscription "Given by Lt Col AC Bromhead CBE JP Chairman of the House Committee of Governors 1915–1956". In front of the steps are commemorative slabs with inscriptions dedicated to the Bromheads: "In most loving memory of the same Lt Col Alfred Claude Bromhead CBE JP Who died 5th March 1963 aged 86 at Petersham Beloved husband and father His ashes lie here His life and devotion to family Was an example and inspiration to many and In loving memory of his wife Margaret Eileen Bromhead A former matron and governor Of the Star and Garter Home Who died 18th October 1978 Aged 72".

The memorial is a Grade II listed building, first listed on 11 September 2012.
