= South African War Memorial, Richmond Cemetery =

First World War memorial in London, England

South African War Memorial
- England, United Kingdom
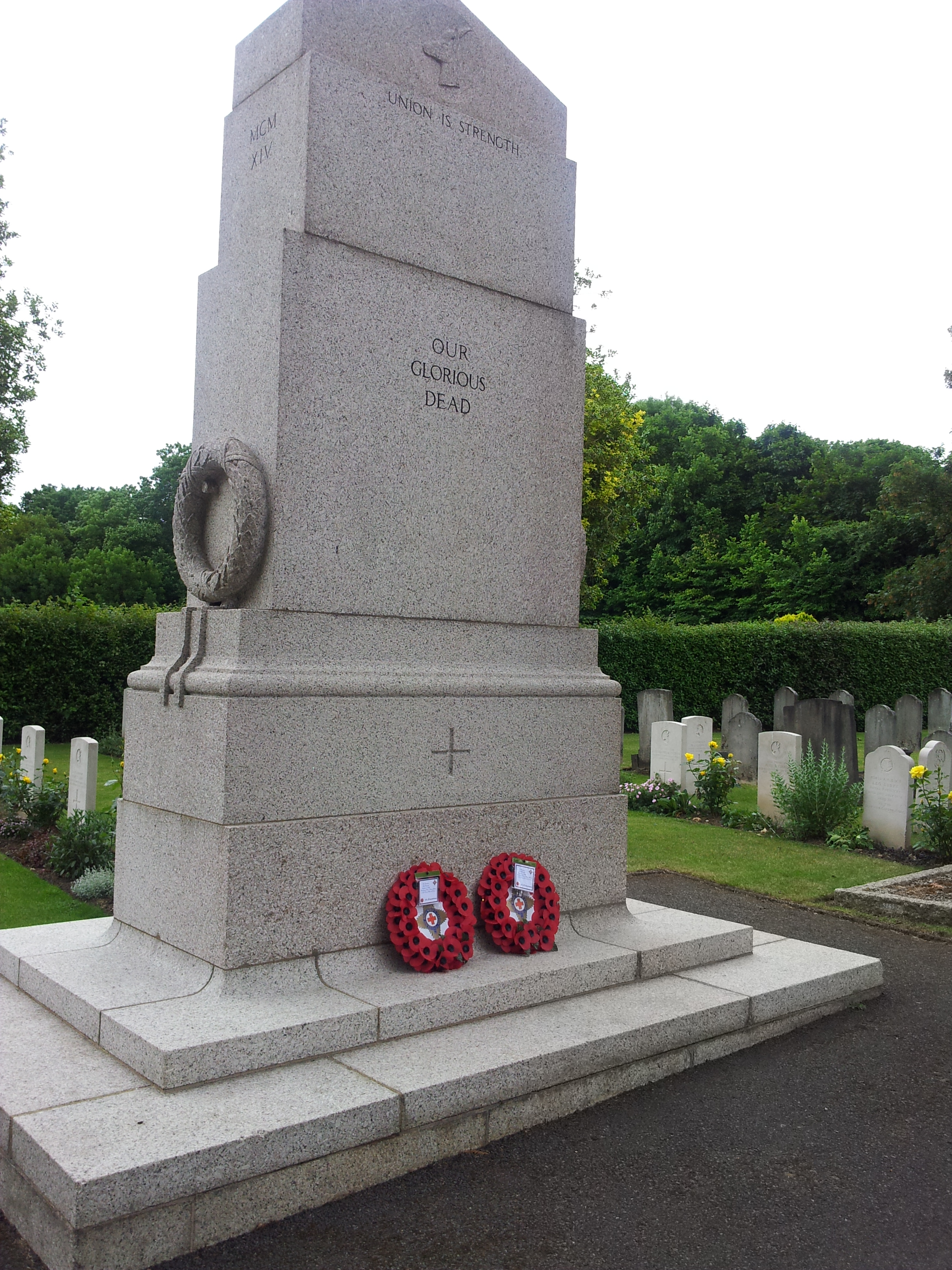
- For 39 South African soldiers who died at the South African Military Hospital in Richmond Park
- Unveiled: 1921
- Location: 51.45690°N 0.28662°W; Richmond Cemetery, Grove Road, Richmond, London
- Designed by: Sir Edwin Lutyens
- UNION IS STRENGTH, OUR GLORIOUS DEAD / EENDRAGHT MAAKT MACHT, ONZEN GEVALLENEN HELDEN

Listed Building – Grade II
- Official name: South African War Memorial
- Designated: 24 July 2012
- Reference no.: 1409475

The South African War Memorial is a First World War memorial in Richmond Cemetery in the London Borough of Richmond upon Thames. Designed by architect Sir Edwin Lutyens, the memorial is in the form of a cenotaph, similar to that on Whitehall, also by Lutyens. It was commissioned by the South African Hospital and Comforts Fund Committee to commemorate the 39 South African soldiers who died of their wounds at a military hospital in Richmond Park during the First World War. The memorial was unveiled by General Jan Smuts in 1921 and was the focus of pilgrimages from South Africa through the 1920s and 1930s, after which it was largely forgotten until the 1980s when the Commonwealth War Graves Commission took responsibility for its maintenance. It has been a grade II listed building since 2012.

== Background ==
Richmond Park, adjacent to the cemetery, was the location of the South African Military Hospital during the First World War, and 39 South African soldiers who died at the hospital were buried in Richmond Cemetery. After the end of the war, the South African Hospital and Comforts Fund Committee resolved to erect a memorial in the area of the cemetery known as "soldiers' corner", which includes the graves of the 39 South Africans. The committee commissioned Sir Edwin Lutyens, described by Historic England as "the leading English architect of his generation" to design the memorial, Lutyens having previously designed the Cenotaph on Whitehall which became the focus for the national Remembrance Sunday commemorations. Lutyens was also responsible for the Rand Regiments Memorial (later renamed the Anglo-Boer War Memorial) in Johannesburg, erected in 1911 to commemorate the Second Boer War (1899–1902)—his first war memorial. After the First World War, he worked extensively with the Imperial War Graves Commission (IWCG) to design memorials in cemeteries on the Western Front, including the Thiepval Memorial to the Missing—the largest British war memorial anywhere in the world—and the Stone of Remembrance which appears in all large IWCG cemeteries.

Historic England described Richmond Cemetery as being "unusually well endowed with war memorials and war graves". Close to the South African Memorial is a section dedicated to ex-servicemen from the Royal Star and Garter Home in Richmond, which is marked by the Bromhead Memorial.

== History and design ==
The memorial is in the form of a cenotaph, constructed in coarse granite to a design modelled on the Whitehall cenotaph. Unusually among Lutyens' memorials, it has a triangular top. It has a flared base and sits on a base of two stone steps, in contrast to the three on which most of Lutyens' memorials stand. The only significant relief on the memorial is two sculpted wreaths, one on each side, which have their own carved supports. The apex of each face bears the head of a springbok, the national symbol of South Africa, in low relief. The memorial contains inscription in both English and Dutch: on the outer face (facing away from the war graves) is the English inscription "UNION IS STRENGTH / OUR GLORIOUS DEAD", on the base below which is an inscribed cross; on the opposite side, facing the graves, is the same dedication in Dutch, "EENDRAGHT MAAKT MACHT, ONZEN GEVALLENEN HELDEN". On the north side of the cenotaph is engraved the Roman numeral MMXIV (1914) and on the south MMXIX (1919).

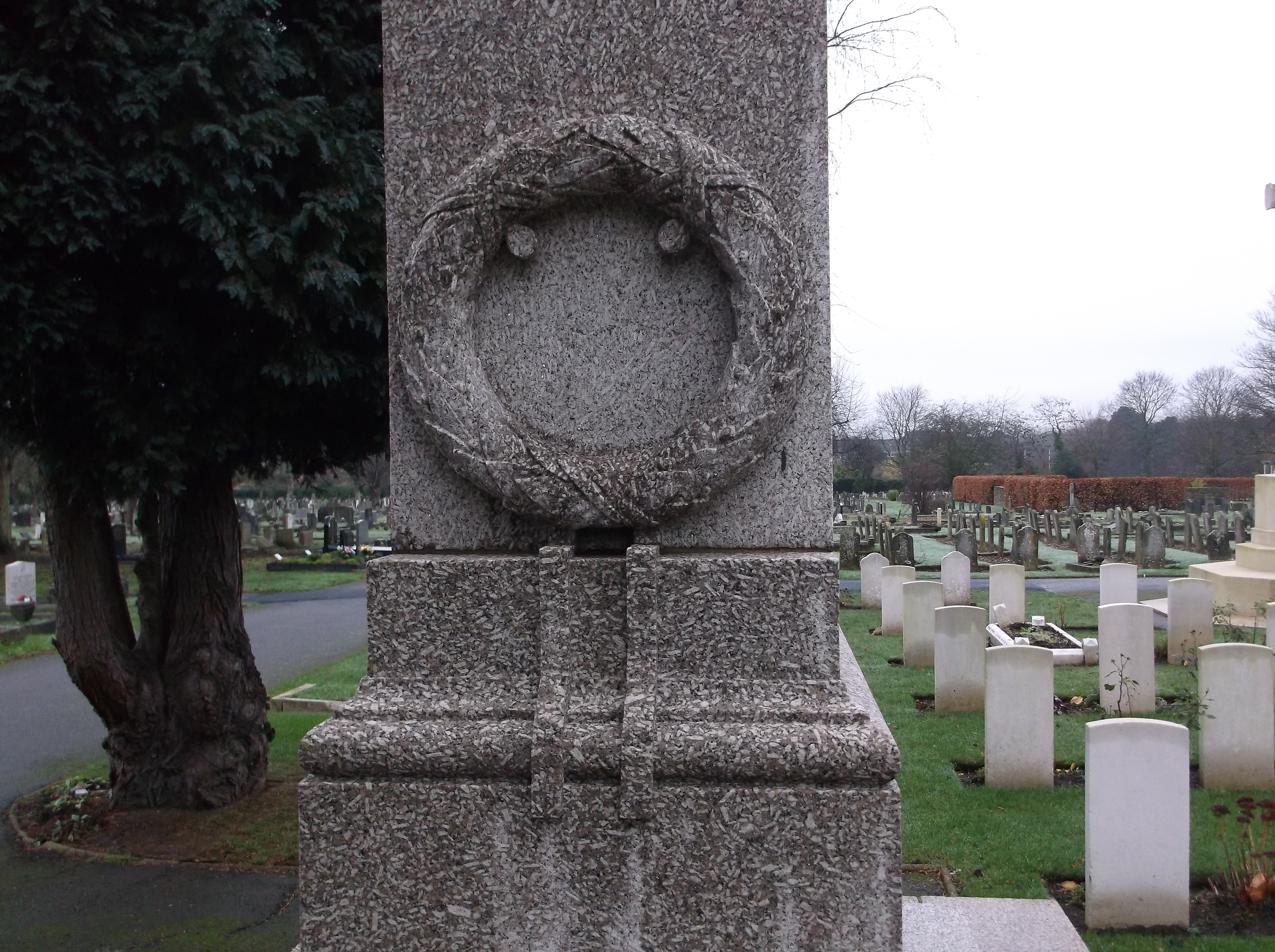
One of the sculpted wreaths on the cenotaph, the only significant relief on the memorial

According to Lutyens researcher Tim Skelton, the starkness of the South African Memorial in comparison to other Lutyens memorials and its differences to his other works is symbolic of the breakdown of the relationship between Lutyens and Herbert Baker. The two architects had collaborated on several projects in South Africa and India, but ultimately fell out over an alteration to the design of New Delhi.

The memorial was unveiled on 30 June 1921 and formally accepted by South African General Jan Smuts, who had previously laid the foundation stone, on behalf of the South African government in a ceremony officiated by the Bishop of St Albans. After the unveiling, it became a focal point for pilgrims from South Africa throughout the 1920s and 1930s, but thereafter fell into a state of neglect, in part due to strained relationships with South Africa during the apartheid era. It came to the attention of the IWGC (by then renamed the Commonwealth War Graves Commission) in 1981, and the commission agreed to take responsibility for its maintenance on behalf of the South African government.

Since 24 July 2012, the cenotaph has been designated a grade II listed building for its special architectural or historic interest, a status which offers legal protection from unauthorised demolition or unauthorised modification. In November 2015, as part of commemorations for the centenary of the First World War, Lutyens' war memorials were recognised as a "national collection" and all 44 of his free-standing memorials were listed or had their listing status reviewed and their National Heritage List for England list entries were updated and expanded.

== Sources ==
- Beach, Darren (2013). London's Cemeteries. London: Metro Publications. ISBN 9781902910406.
- Meller, Hugh; Parsons, Brian (2011). London Cemeteries: An Illustrated Guide and Gazetteer (fifth ed.). Stroud, Gloucestershire: The History Press. ISBN 9780752461830.
- Skelton, Tim; Gliddon, Gerald (2008). Lutyens and the Great War. London: Frances Lincoln Publishers. ISBN 9780711228788.
