= George Powell Thomas =

British officer, artist and poet (1808–1857)

George Powell Thomas (1808–1857) was a Major in the 3rd Bengal European Regiment who died at the Battle of Agra during the Indian Mutiny. He was described as "a man of consummate courage, a man of genius, an artist and a poet."

== Early life ==
He was born on 26 August 1808 at Bahramghat near Lucknow, the son of Major General Lewis Thomas C.B., Colonel of the 3rd Regt. of Foot Bengal Army E.I.C.S., and Maria Frances.

== Career ==
Commissioned in 1825, he was an assistant in the Thagi department in 1835, and in civil employ in the Central Provinces as assistant commissioner from 1835 to 1840. He served as a Captain with the 64th Bengal Native Infantry, taking part in the relief force of Jellalabad (1842).

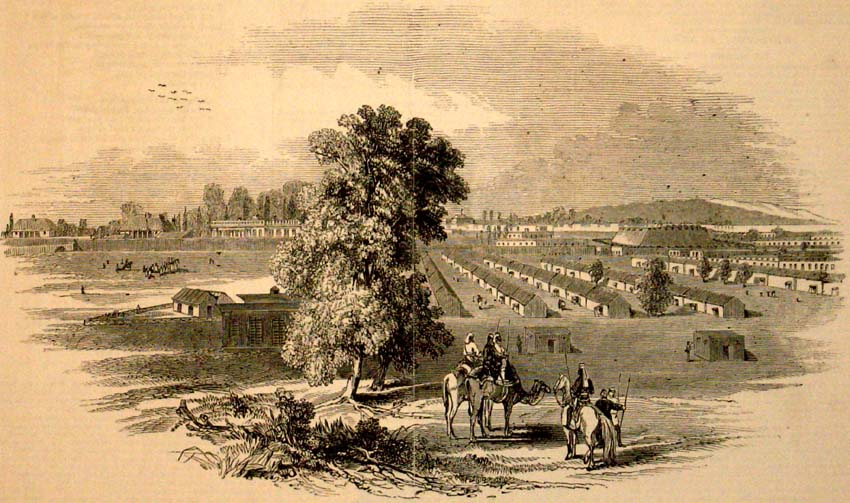
"Loodianah, on the Sutlej"

He served in Afghanistan under General Sir George Pollock during the Afghan War, where he commanded a corps of Jezailchees. He was promoted to Major in 1851.

He was at home on sick leave on the breaking out of the war with Russia, he applied for and obtained the command of a regiment in the Turkish Contingent under General Vivian. He commanded a regiment of Bashi Bazouks under Major-General William Beatson in Turkey, where the Queen conferred upon him the local rank of Lieutenant-Colonel in Turkey. He then left for the Crimea as a volunteer and was present at the fall of Sevastopol (1855), for which he received the Crimea Medal.

At the battle before Agra on the 15 July 1857, despite being already ill, he commanded and led on five companies of his regiment on the right wing. He was severely wounded in the foot, and his horse also receiving three bullets fell on top of him, thereby injuring his head. He died of his wounds on 4 August in the fort at Agra. He was buried in the fort cemetery at Agra.

== Artist ==
He was a talented amateur artist producing 'Sketches of the Himalayas' and in 1846 he published his twenty-four, hand-coloured, lithographed 'Views of Simla'. They were much acclaimed. A review in The Spectator noted that "Captain Thomas has made sketches of the most striking features of the country round Simla; which have been lithographed in the tinted manner by Messrs. Dickinson and published in a folio volume. They are spirited and effective in style, and drawn on the stone with a freedom that is more agreeable than laboured and formal execution; besides being characteristic of the rapid and vigorous pencil of a soldier."

== Poetry and plays ==
In 1847 he published a book of poems, described as "a volume of very graceful poems, full of feeling and thought." His poems were included in anthologies, such as The Book of the Sonnet (1867).

To Constance, in absence

THOU art not here! And ere we meet again,

Long years may pass away, and even thou,

My fair young bride, — some shadows on thy brow,

The tokens some of time and some of pain,

May, ere that hour, have stolen in, to stain

The fairest face that e'er won lover's vow.

What matter ? Be thy heart as it is now;

Let that its freshness, beauty, truth retain,

And something of its own sweet power to adorn

Whate'er it loves, with such divinest light

As hovers o'er the mountain-top at morn,

Yet makes the poorest blossom heavenly bright:

Blest in those arms from which I now am torn,

I shall note nothing, then, of time or blight.

To Constance, written in absence

Knowing, too surely, that whatever years

Fate may allot us, of united bliss,

There still must come a parting wet with tears,

Alas, sad, awful agonizing kiss,

Which deathless love, and death-bed hopes and fears,

Must wring with thoughts of other worlds and this;

And knowing that each hour that moment nears,

Though its approach by mercy shrouded is,

—Oh, I must hold my loss of every day

Which basking in thy presence doth not bless,

A fine as harsh as victims ever pay,

Or tyrants ever wring from weak distress;

A fine,—by each hour pass'd from thee away,—

That makes my lawful span of life-time less!

Jumnootree;

A peak in the Himalayas, twenty-five thousand feet above the level of the sea.

SHARP, clear, and crystalline, cleaving the sky

In twain, it towers for ever and alone,

Save that about its feet the tall hills lie,

Like slaves around some mighty despot's throne,—

While evermore, beneath its cold stern eye,

The short-liv'd centuries have come and flown,

And stars that round its head untiring fly,

Confess its glories ancient as their own !-

The eagles shun it in their highest flight;

The clouds lie basking 'neath its eminence;

Nought nears it but thin air and heaven's sweet light,

Nor not a sound for ever cometh thence,

Save of some avalanche from its summit riven,

Or thunder-tempest on its breakers driven!

A review of his plays noted that "The intrigue, struggle and revenge, which formed so prominent a part of medieval Italian life, was well expressed by G. P. Thomas, in his Michele Orombello, or the Fatal Secret, and The Assassin, or the Rival Lovers. They are essentially tragical, and very few of the important characters are living at the end of the fifth act. Powerful in plot, and exhibiting considerable skill in the analysis of emotion, they are quite in the forefront of Anglo-Indian dramatic literature, though the slightness of the underplot in the first play and the deficiency of female characters in the second mar their effectiveness to some extent."

== Personal life ==
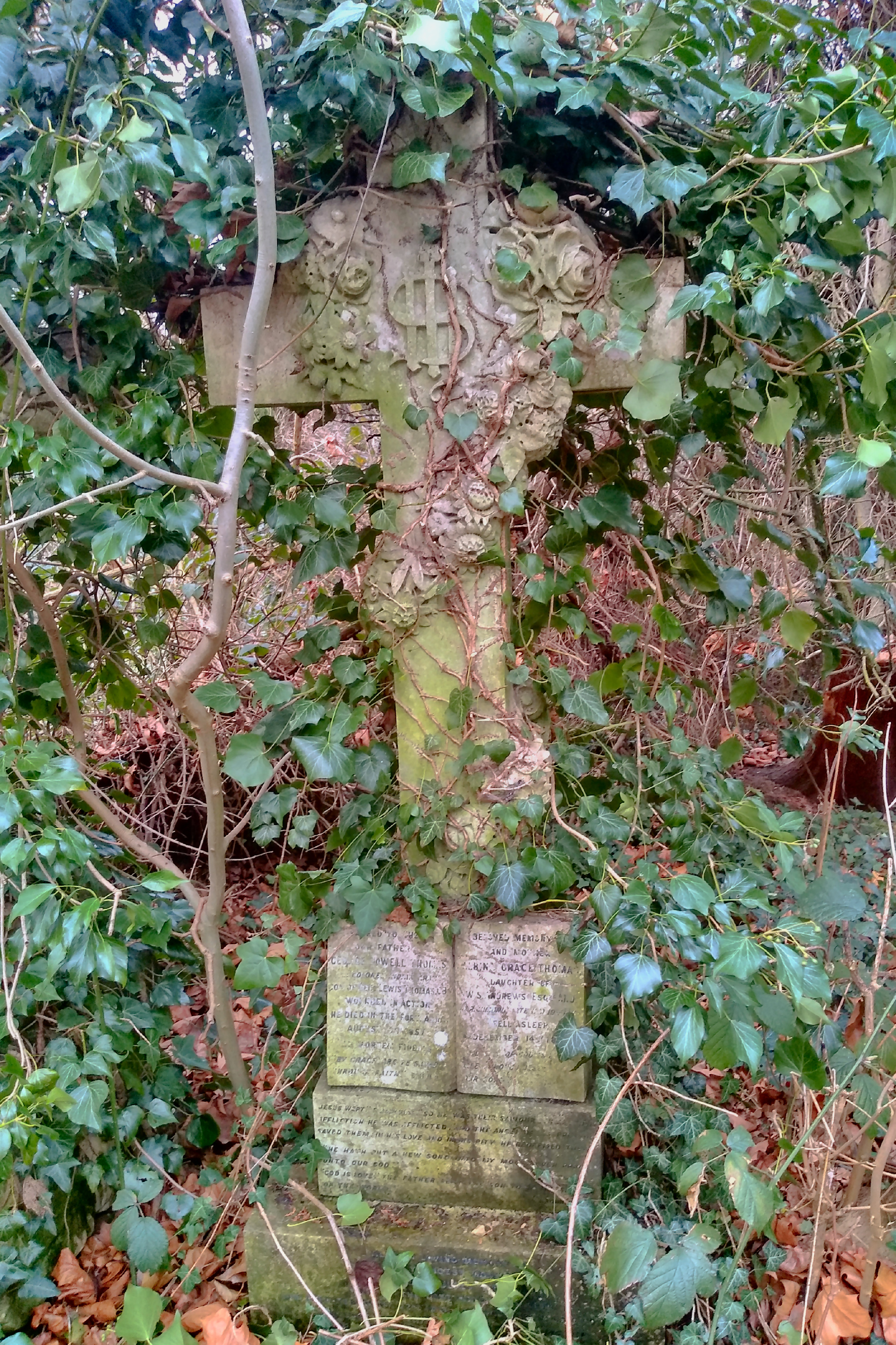
Richmond Old Cemetery

He married Albina Grace Andrews (b 1811, Richmond) 1 August 1831 at Dacca. Their children were Marian Albina (b 1832, Dinapore, Bengal), Charles Lewis Stratford (b 1833, Dinapore, Bengal), Stratford Powell (b 1837, Saugor, Bengal, d 1839), Charles Frederick (b 1843 Subathu, Bengal), Montague George (1844, Calcutta, Bengal), Alice Constance (b 1846, Bath, Somerset), Alfred Campbell (b 1847, d 1848, Allahabad, Bengal), Florence Juliet (b 1849, Meerut, Bengal). His wife died at 28, Montague Road, Richmond in 1889 and is buried in Richmond Old Cemetery, where he is also commemorated.

== Publications ==
- Views of Simla (1846). London: Dickinson & Co.
- Poems (1847). London: Smith, Elder and Co.
- Two Tragedies (1852). London: W Thacker & Co.
- Views of Simla (2015). Studio Orientalia. ISBN 978-8192450254
