= Elizabeth Evans (nurse) =

English Crimean War nurse and writer (1829–1914)

Elizabeth Evans (1829–1914) was a resilient working-class camp follower who accompanied her husband when he was deployed to the Crimea. Evans provided a rare female eyewitness account of the front lines of the Crimean War. Her husband, William Evans, served in the 4th Foot (King's Own) Regiment and was servant to Lieutenant (later Major General) Cuthbert Eccles. She became well known later in life through her narrative of the conflict which was recorded by the author Walter Wood, published as "A Soldier's Wife in the Crimea" in the Royal Magazine (July 1908); another interview was published in the Richmond Herald in 1909.

== Early life ==
Elizabeth Jones was born in Clifton, Bristol, in August 1829, the daughter of William, a ship wright, and Ann; she was baptised on 23 August 1829 at St Andrew's Church. At the time of the 1841 Census the family were living in the parish of St Philip and St Jacob, Bristol. She married William Evans (1823–1898) on 1 December 1851 at St George's Church, Brandon Hill, Bristol. William, who was also born in Clifton, was then a private who had joined the army on 18 September 1839, giving his age as 18. (Note: The record for his wedding records his father as Samuel Evans, pensioner. The 1851 Census shows Samuel and his wife Eleanor at Dark Gate Lane, Clifton. The baptism register for Clifton St Andrew records William's baptism on 27 Apr 1823, parents Samuel and Eleanor.)

Mrs Elizabeth Evans in 1899

== Crimean War ==
Mrs Evans joined the regiment at Ashton-under-Lyne. To earn extra money, she washed clothes for soldiers, making a halfpenny per day from each man.

"My new home was a corner of a barrack room, in which twenty-four men lived and slept. Our bedroom was a corner of the room curtained off at night. Soldiers' wives now have no idea of what we had to go through. Why we fought almost for the privilege of doing a soldier's washing at a halfpenny a day. I had nearly a score of Tommies on my books, and that meant a comfortable addition to our pay."

When the Crimea war broke out the regiment were stationed in Edinburgh. She embarked with her husband at Leith on the Golden Fleece.. The King's Own were part of the 3rd Division which landed in the Crimea on 14 September 1854. She was one of 17 women who travelled with the regiment; most of the other women disembarked at Malta. At Gallipoli cholera broke out. They then sailed to Varna. The army explicitly ordered women to stay behind before sailing for the Crimean peninsula. When The King's Own left Varna, Mrs Evans and two other women (the others being Mrs. Rebecca Box and Mrs. Chilton) in her regiment managed to defy orders, sneak onto the transport ships, and make it directly to the combat front line.

"Before we got to the seat of war our regiment were in trouble with the cholera; it was worse than the battle itself, and then when we were ordered to go to Varna the order went forth that the women were to be left behind. Not, a bit of it though; we got round an embarkation officer and some soldiers and managed to sneak aboard. When it came to landing again there was trouble, and my husband boldly went up to Lord Raglan and said, 'I would rather drown her - meaning me - than leave her to the mercy of the foreigners.' That settled it, and I was never parted from him again except when he went back to England with some Russian prisoners.

"I landed in the Crimea, in the summer time, and lovely weather it was, too – just as beautiful as the winter was cruel. With balmy air and sunshine you can endure many shortages of food and drink and clothing; but it is different when the icy winds are blowing, when the snow is falling heavily, and when there is nothing at night between your resting place and the bitter sky."

"When the summer was still with us my husband and I made shift to sleep in a sort of dug out in the ground, with twigs and branches as bedclothes; but when the cold weather came the covering was taken away for firewood. You remember those dark and sorry days, when there were so many clothes and comforts sent from home for the soldiers in the Crimea? – necessities which never reached us, but which remained and rotted on the shores where they had been landed. There were many sad blunderings, and the result was that many soldiers perished, although the means of salvation was so close at hand. I used to see the young recruits, fresh from home, drop and die of starvation and disease; yet with all the privation and suffering there was such courage and patience shown as almost put into the shade, I think, the valour of the battlefield."

=== Alma ===
At Battle of the Alma on 20 September Mrs Evans was among the General Staff on a nearby ridge and witnessed the British army drawn up for battle with the Russians. The regimental colours were carried by Lieutenant Eccles.

"The marching was terrible, my feet were sore and blistered, and I was dead tired. But I had to keep on, and at last at Alma I saw my first battle. I was watching the disposition of the troops when a major on horse said to me, 'Look well at that, Mrs. Evans, for the Queen of England would give a great deal to see that sight.' And it was a sight, too. There were 57,000 English, French, and Turkish to storm heights held by 50,000 Russians with 180 field pieces to protect them. I shall never forget the agony with which I watched my husband's regiment facing a tornado of shot and shell. It was awful, but, thank God, my husband came through without a hurt. Our colours suffered terribly though, and I had the proud task of repairing them after they had come through the action. I got quite used to dodging the shots and shells. In the day we were guided by the hiss, and at night by the flame of the missiles, but for all that were a terrible number of sick and wounded."

=== Suffering of the wounded ===
Unlike the wives of officers or official volunteers who remained behind the lines at distant base hospitals, Evans was a working-class woman embedded in the daily horrors of camp life. She was an "unofficial nurse" who directly supported the 4th Foot's hospital tent, tirelessly caring for soldiers struck down by cholera, dysentery, and battle wounds and was highly praised for her devotion and nursing services.

"The suffering of the sick and wounded was terrible. Poor creatures! I cannot say that I nursed them – there were no hospital appliances then, and all I could do was to give them the help of a women’s sympathy. Just a rough covering or tent was put up, when there was material, and beneath it our brave fellows were packed like herrings in barrels, and the three doctors who were with us did all they could. Little enough it was."

"Their sufferings were awful, for there was hardly any shelter. If a tent was rigged up it was packed to suffocation. There were only three doctors to all those men, too. Miss Nightingale had not yet come out and when she did she was at Scutari, a place I never visited. If you fell ill, practically nothing could be done. You simply laid there."

" 'Come over here to the trenches,' my husband said to me, 'it is like a shambles. They are cutting off arms and legs wholesale.' I refused to go. Later I saw them burying the dead. A great big pit was dug, and broken guns and empty rifles and dead bodies were all thrown in together and covered over."

=== Winter 1854 ===
At the Battle of Inkerman on 5 November Mrs Evans was left in camp. “The dreadful winter came, and I was perished with cold and hunger. I had nothing except what I stood upright in. We had no blankets, but I had a beautiful great Scotch plaid shawl. This kept me warm to some extent, and often enough I shared my husband’s greatcoat, and sometimes had it for myself when he was in the trenches. He would come back from the awful work shivering and almost frozen, and time after time I would remove his boots and rub his feet, which were utterly numb, and likely to come off from frost bite.”

Then in winter 1854 they took part in the Siege of Sevastopol. "Being a woman, I was something of a favourite with all ranks, officers and men alike, and being a wife I wanted to be where my husband was. That happened to me, at one time, on outlying picket, that is to say, as near the Russians as it was possible to get. There was nothing but a little stretch of ground between their nearest sentries and our own, and often in the blackness of the winter night the sentinels would fire upon and kill each other. Outlying picket was no place for a woman, but I was allowed to go because by husband liked to be with me, and I wanted to be with him. Time after time I went, and I got many a terrible scare."

"We got to take those things very lightly, and the officers would joke and say: 'Let us eat and drink what we’ve got and make the best of it, for tomorrow our heads may be off our shoulders.' And often enough they were, too. Very frequently, when we were besieging Sebastopol, I would watch the firing with some of the drummer boys, and it was wonderful to look down into that marvellous fortress and see the big guns bursting into lurid fire and hear their solemn booming in the gloomy hills."

=== Returned home ===
Her husband was sent to Scutari while she remained in camp. Later she caught fever and was invalided home. She was not re-united with her husband until after the war.

"After I was separated from my husband I fell ill with fever. There I lay on the bare ground waiting for the end. One day I saw three men coming with planks, and in an agony of terror I cried 'Don't bury me, I'm not dead yet.' What was my joy when they said they had come to take me to a hospital of some kind. I had not seen my husband and had had no news of him for a long time. It was not till I of back to England we were re-united. I had had a terrible time, but I would go through it all again with my husband by my side."

"When I was fit to move I was strapped on to a mule, myself on one side and two men on the other, and in that way I was carried down to the sea and put on board ship, in which I came home to Portsmouth, and there, before we landed, Queen Victoria steamed round and sent on board to inquire about us."

"For two years I had not slept in a bed, I had endured privations which I cannot describe, I had witnessed horrors which I dare not speak about, and now I seemed to be in paradise, for on board the ship I had port wine and stout and every good thing that an invalid could need. These comforts were some recompense for the privations we had gone through at the seat of war. But the greatest joy of all was the reunion with my husband."

== India ==
In 1857 the regiment were sent to Mauritius and she accompanied them but the Indian Mutiny had broken out so they were sent to India.

"In India I was separated from him again, and by myself I travelled down the country for several nights to join a missionary’s wife, who was coming home, after spending many years in the country, where, till she saw me, she had not set eyes on a white women for nine years. The terror of the Mutiny had turned her hair quite white."

William Evans received the Crimea medal with clasps for Sebastopol, Inkerman and Alma, the Turkish medal and the Indian Mutiny Medal.

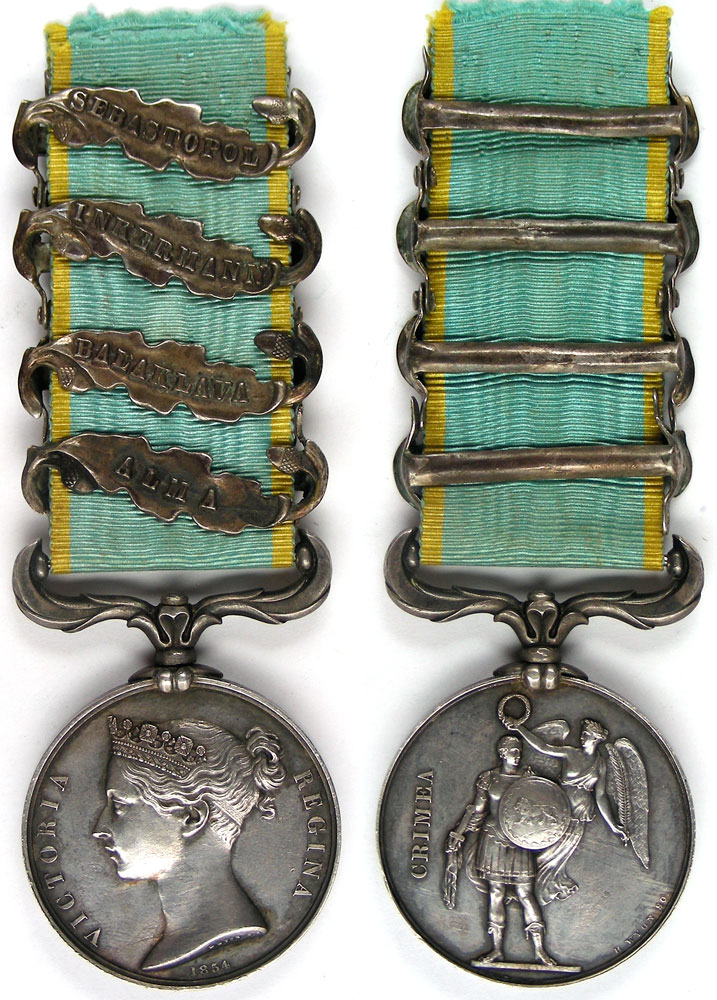
Crimea Medal

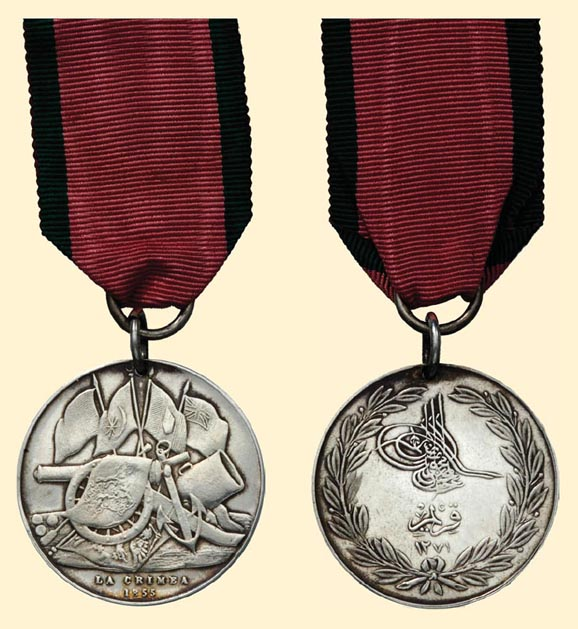
Turkish Crimea Medal

Indian Mutiny Medal

== Later life ==
After 21 years service, including 10 in the East Indies, William Evans left the army in January 1861. On the 1861 census they had returned to live in Clifton with her sister, Mary Ann, recorded as their servant; William was then a painter and Chelsea Pensioner. By 1871 they had moved to "a little ivy-covered house" at 4 Shakespeare Terrace, Lower Richmond Road, North Sheen, Richmond where she ran a laundry. William died on 18 August 1898 aged 80 and was buried in Mortlake. After his death she received special permission to wear his military medals.

Mrs Evans received a pension from the Royal Patriotic Fund. She died 30 January 1914 aged 84 and was buried in Richmond cemetery. She was given a military funeral, her coffin covered by the pall of the King's Own Lancashire Regiment; the only woman in the regiment's history to be given that distinction. The wreath on the coffin was inscribed "In deepest sympathy from the members of the sergeants' mess, 1st King's Own Regiment." The "Last Post" was sounded by buglers from Kneller Hall. The route of her funeral procession was thickly lined with people; her family were represented by nephews and her sister, Mrs Tillman, who had travelled from Wales.

Following her wish her husband's medals were given to his old Regiment but they are not found there now.
