= Beatrice Natalie Opperman =

Chair and President of St Dunstan's, received the Star of South Africa (1904 – 1988)

Beatrice Natalie Opperman (1904–1988), was the first woman Chairman and later President of St Dunstan's (South Africa). She was awarded the Star of South Africa by the South African government in 1982.

She was born Beatrice Natalie Gallwey on 25 December 1904 in Pietermaritzburg, Natal, South Africa, the daughter of Albert Edward Gallwey (who was the cousin of Sir Michael Gallwey), and Mary Elizabeth Walsh. She was educated at Maris Stella Convent, Durban and Loreto Convent, Pretoria.

The brother of a school friend was blinded in World War I and she helped in raising funds for the St Dunstan's charity for the war-blinded.

She was invited to join the board of St Dunstan's in 1953. In 1966 she was elected the first woman chairman and on retiring as chairman in 1986 she become the first lady President of St Dunstan’s South Africa. She was awarded the Star of South Africa (Civil) Knight by the South African government in 1982. A spokesman for St Dunstan's said: "She will always be remembered for the deep insight she had into the needs of those who faced the traumatic loss of sight in the defence of their country".

== Personal life ==
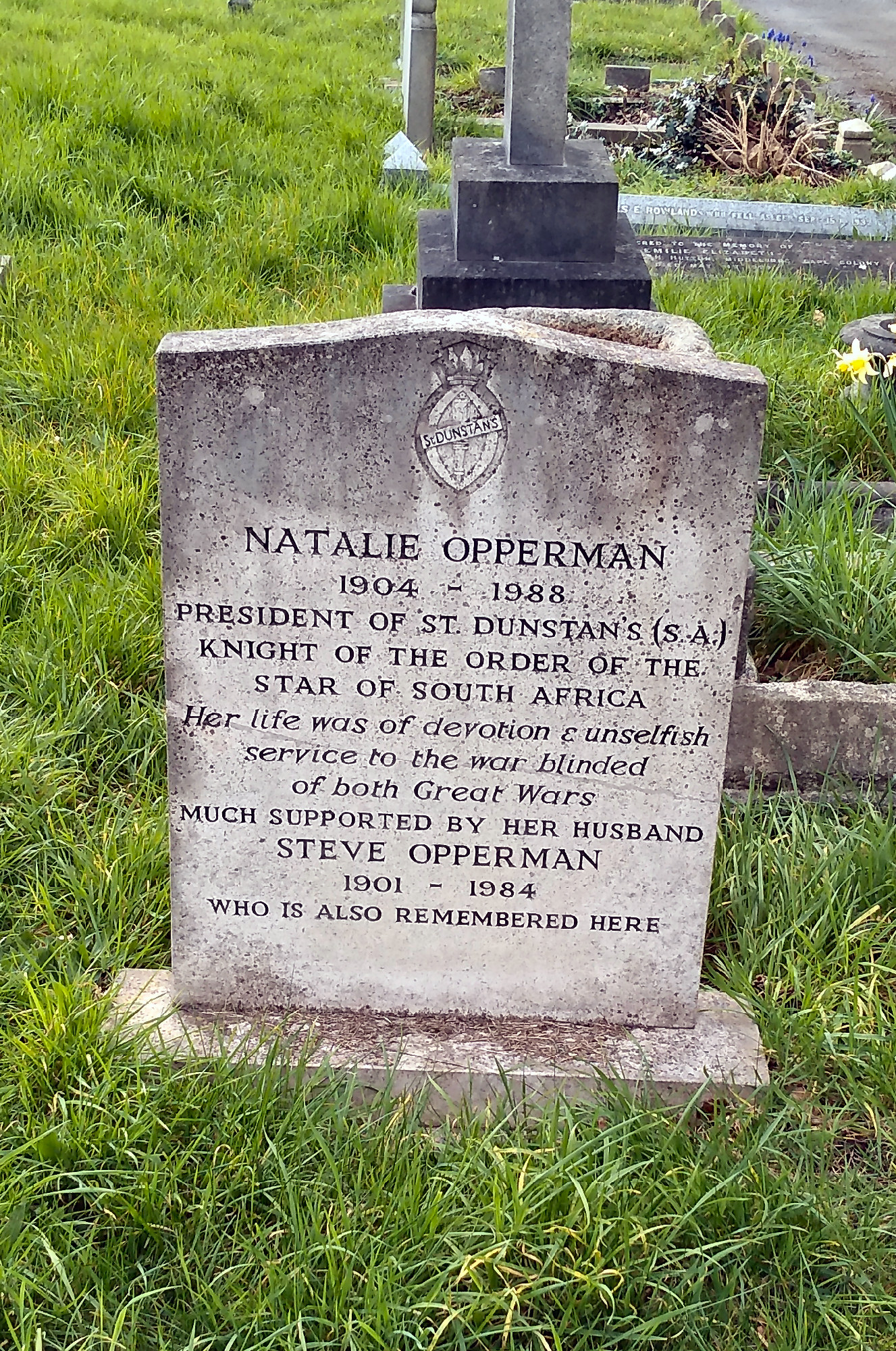
Natalie Opperman's grave

She had a daughter, Rosemary Anne Gregory, from her first marriage. Her second marriage, on 7 February 1948 in Wynberg, Cape Town, was to Festus ("Steve") Diederick Opperman, who predeceased her.

She died on 25 June 1988 during a flight to London. The Natalie Opperman Memorial Fund was set up following her death. Her funeral service was on 4 July 1988 at Brompton Oratory, followed by private burial at Richmond Cemetery. A memorial service was held In Cape Town.
