= Skoutari =

Skoutari (Greek: Σκουτάρι) may refer to:

- Skoutari, Laconia, a village in the southwestern part of Laconia, Greece
- Skoutari Bay, a bay on the east coast of the Mani Peninsula, Greece
- Skoutari, Serres, a village in the Serres regional unit, Greece
- Scutari (disambiguation), several places outside Greece formerly known by the name
