= Scutari =

Scutari may refer to:

- Shkodër, in Albania; also known as Scutari in Italian and traditional English usage
- Sanjak of Scutari, Ottoman province centred on the city
- Pashalik of Scutari, a semi-independent Albanian state during Ottoman rule
- Lake Skadar, on the border of Albania and Montenegro, also known as Lake Scutari
- Üsküdar (formerly Scutari and Chrysopolis), a municipality of Istanbul, Turkey on the Anatolian side of the city
  - Scutari Barracks, a former hospital in Üsküdar where Florence Nightingale worked
- Shtit, a village in Svilengrad municipality, Haskovo Province, Bulgaria, known among its former Greek inhabitants as Scutari
- Scutari, a village in Mileanca Commune, Botoşani County, Romania
- Nicholas Scutari, American politician
- Scutari, a classification of Roman gladiators that used scutum shields

== See also ==
- Skoutari (disambiguation), various places in Greece
