= Potts (surname) =

Potts (and Pott) is a surname of English origin. The word potts refers to circular hollows in the ground.

Notable people with the name include:

- Alec Potts (born 1996), Australian archer
- Alistair Potts (born 1971), British rower
- Allan Potts (1904–1952), American speed skater
- Allan Potts (athletics) (1934–2014), New Zealand athlete, coach, and administrator
- Alpheus Potts (1838–1911), American lawyer, judge, and politician
- Andrew Potts (disambiguation), several people
- Anna Longshore Potts (1829–1912), American physician
- Annie Potts (born 1952), American actress
- Arnold Potts (1896–1968), Australian Brigadier and grazier
- Arthur Potts (disambiguation), several people
- Barbara Potts (born 1932), American politician
- Benjamin F. Potts (1836–1887), American lawyer, politician, and soldier
- Bill Potts (disambiguation), several people
- Brad Potts (born 1994), English footballer
- Cameron Potts (born 1971), Australian rock musician
- Carl Potts (born 1952), American comic-book writer, artist, and editor
- Charles Potts (born 1943), American projectivist poet
- Cliff Potts (born 1942), American actor
- Daddy Potts (1898–1981), American football player
- David Potts (disambiguation), several people
- Denys Campion Potts (1923–2016), British modern linguist
- Duncan Potts (born 1961), Royal Navy admiral
- Ebinabo Potts-Johnson (born 1988), Nigerian beauty pageant contestant and model
- Edward Potts (disambiguation), several people
- Eric Potts (born 1965), British actor
- Frank Potts (disambiguation), several people
- Frederick Potts (disambiguation), several people
- Gareth Potts (born 1983), British pool player
- Gary Potts (c.1945–2020), chief of the Temagami First Nation and the Teme-Augama Anishnabai
- Geoffrey Potts, American cognitive psychologist and professor
- Harry Potts (1920–1996), English football player and manager
- Jason Potts (disambiguation), several people
- Jerry Potts (c.1840–1896), Canadian Métis guide and interpreter
- Joe Potts, Scottish race car driver and constructor
- Joe Potts (footballer) (1889–1980), English footballer
- John Potts (disambiguation), several people
- Ken Potts (1921–2023), American sailor
- Laramie Potts, American civil and environmental engineer, scientist, and educator
- Laura Potts (born 1996), English poet
- Leonard Potts (1897–1960), English academic and translator
- Lisa Potts, British schoolteacher, public health nurse, and author; injured defending children in her care from a machete attack
- Malcolm Potts, British-born American physician, reproductive scientist, author, and professor
- Marie Mason Potts (1895–1978), Maidu journalist and activist
- Matthew Potts (born 1998), English cricketer
- Matthew Ichihashi Potts, American theologian and preacher
- Michael Potts or Mike Potts (disambiguation), several people
- Midge Potts, American peace activist and politician
- Natalie Potts (born 2004), American basketball player
- Olivia Potts, British cookery writer
- Paul Potts (born 1970), British tenor who won the first series of ITV's Britain's Got Talent in 2007
- Paul Potts (writer) (1911–1990), British-born poet, author of Dante Called You Beatrice
- Robin Buxton Potts, Canadian politician
- Reg Potts (1927–1996), English footballer
- Reginald Potts (1892–1968), British gymnast
- Renfrey Potts (1925–2005), Australian mathematician
- Richard Potts (1753–1808), American politician and jurist
- Roosevelt Potts (born 1971), American football player
- Russ Potts (1939–2021), American businessman and politician
- Ruan Potts (born 1977), South African mixed martial artist
- Sarah-Jane Potts (born 1976), British actress
- Seán Potts (1930–2014), Irish musician
- Steve Potts (disambiguation), several people
- Taylor Potts (born 1987), American football player
- Templin Potts (1855–1927), American naval officer and Naval Governor of Guam
- Thomas Potts (disambiguation), several people
- Tony Potts (born 1963), American television presenter
- Tony Potts (politician) (born 1976/77), American politician
- Travon Potts (born 1970), American songwriter and producer
- Wallace Potts (1947–2006), American film director, screenwriter, and archivist
- William Potts (disambiguation), several people
- Zoe Potts (born 2002), English rugby player

== Fictional characters ==
- Bill Potts (Doctor Who), a character in Doctor Who
- Caractacus Pott, a character in Chitty Chitty Bang Bang
- Clytie Potts, a character in Philip Reeve's Mortal Engines Quartet
- Douglas Potts, a character on the ITV soap opera Emmerdale
- Hilary Potts, a character on the ITV soap opera Emmerdale
- Pepper Potts, a character in the Marvel Comics universe
- Sarah Potts (Shortland Street), a character on the soap opera Shortland Street

== See also ==
- Pott, a surname
- Pott (disambiguation)
