= Richie Story =

Traditional song

Richie Story (Roud 97, Child 232), also called The Earl of Weymss, is an English-language folk song existing in several variants. According to Francis James Child, the ballad is based on historical events that happened around 1673.

== Synopsis ==
Of a group of sisters (three, five, or seven in different variants), one (the youngest, the oldest, or the bonniest) falls in love with Richie Story (or some variant on the name Richard) and rejects an earl for him. She runs off with Richard. In one variant, he proves rich, but in most, she lives in poverty with him, and on being asked if she regretted it, asks how could she, when she gained her heart's desire. In another variant, 'Richie' turns out to be the 'King of all England'.

== Commentary ==
Falling in love with an apparently poor suitor is common in ballads -- The Beggar-Laddie, Dugall Quin, Lizie Lindsay, Glasgow Peggie—but he generally proves a rich man after all; often this is after she regrets the poverty they travel in. This ballad usually shows a rare actual rejection of wealth for true love.

A similar motif is found in the ballad Tom Potts.
