= Potts =

Potts may refer to:

== Arts and entertainment ==
- Tom Potts, Child ballad 109
- The Potts, said to be the world's longest-running cartoon strip drawn by the same artist

== Mathematics ==
- Potts model, model of interacting spins on a crystalline lattice
  - Cellular Potts model, lattice-based computational modeling method to simulate the collective behavior of cellular structures
  - Chiral Potts curve, algebraic curve defined over the complex numbers that occurs in the study of the chiral Potts model of statistical mechanics

== Places ==
- Black Potts Ait, island in the River Thames in England
- Mount Potts, a skiing base in South Island, New Zealand
- Potts Camp, Mississippi, US
- Potts, Missouri, an unincorporated community
- Potts, Nevada, a ghost town in the US
- Potts Creek, Virginia, US
- Potts Hill, a suburb in south-western Sydney, Australia
- Potts Point, a suburb of inner Sydney, Australia

== Other ==
- Potts (surname)
- Potts of Leeds, major British manufacturer of public clocks, based in Leeds, UK

== See also ==
- Pott (surname)
- Pottery, pots
- POTS (disambiguation), various uses
