= Thomas Potts =

Thomas Potts may refer to:

- Thomas Potts (naturalist) (1824–1888), British-born New Zealand naturalist and politician
- Thomas Potts (clerk) (fl. 1609–1616), English law clerk, and the author of the Discoverie of Witches
- Thomas Potts (Pennsylvania politician) (died 1785), American politician from Pennsylvania
- Thomas Potts (writer) (1778–1842), English solicitor and writer
- Thomas R. Potts (1810–1874), American physician, civic leader, and politician
- Tommy Potts (1912–1988), Irish fiddle player and composer
- Thomas Pott or Potts, Scottish royal servant to James VI and I
- Tom Potts, the subject of a child ballad of the same name
