= Richmond War Memorial =

Richmond War Memorial may refer to:

- Richmond War Memorial, London in England
- Virginia War Memorial in Richmond, Virginia, United States
- South African War Memorial, Richmond Cemetery in London, England
