= Joe Potts (disambiguation) =

Joe or Joseph Potts may refer to:

- Joe Potts, British racing driver
- Joe Potts (footballer) (1889-1980), English footballer
- Joseph Hyde Potts (1793-1865), accountant
- Joe Potts (musician), member of Airway (band)
- Joseph Potts (soccer), soccer coach of Kansas City Current
- Joey Potts, American basketball player, see 2020–21 Oregon State Beavers men's basketball team
