= .pot =

.pot may refer to:

- The extension used for template files in Microsoft PowerPoint
- The extension used for template files in GNU gettext

== See also ==
- Pot (disambiguation)
