= Sarah Potts =

Sarah Potts may refer to:

- Sarah Potts (Shortland Street), a character on Shortland Street
- Sarah-Jane Potts (born 1976), English actor
- Sarah Potts (curler) (born 1989), Canadian curler

== See also ==
- Potts (disambiguation)
