= Pott =

Pott may refer to:

== People and fictional characters ==
- Pott (surname)

== Places ==
- Pott, a hamlet in the parish of Ilton cum Pott in North Yorkshire, England
- Pott, a colloquial name for the Ruhr region in Germany

== Other uses ==
- Pott disease, a form of tuberculosis
- Pott (rum), a German rum brand

== See also ==
- Pot (disambiguation)
- Potts (disambiguation)
