= John Potts =

John Potts may refer to:

- John Potts (athlete) (1906–1987), English Olympic athlete
- John Potts (American frontiersman), a member of the Lewis and Clark Expedition
- John Potts (baseball) (1887–1962), Major League Baseball right fielder
- John Potts (British politician) (1861–1938), British Labour Party politician
- John Potts (cricketer) (born 1960), English cricketer
- John Potts (engraver) (1791–1841), English engraver
- John Potts (footballer) (1904–1986), English footballer
- John Potts (Pennsylvanian) (1710–?), founder of Pottstown, Pennsylvania
- John T. Potts (1841–1923), American politician from Pennsylvania
- Sir John Potts, 1st Baronet (c.1592–1673), English politician

== See also ==
- John Pott (died 1645), 17th-century Colonial Governor of Virginia at the Jamestown settlement
- Johnny Pott (born 1935), American professional golfer
