= Municipal Borough of Richmond (Surrey) =

Former local government area in the UK

Coordinates: 51.458°N 0.305°W

Richmond
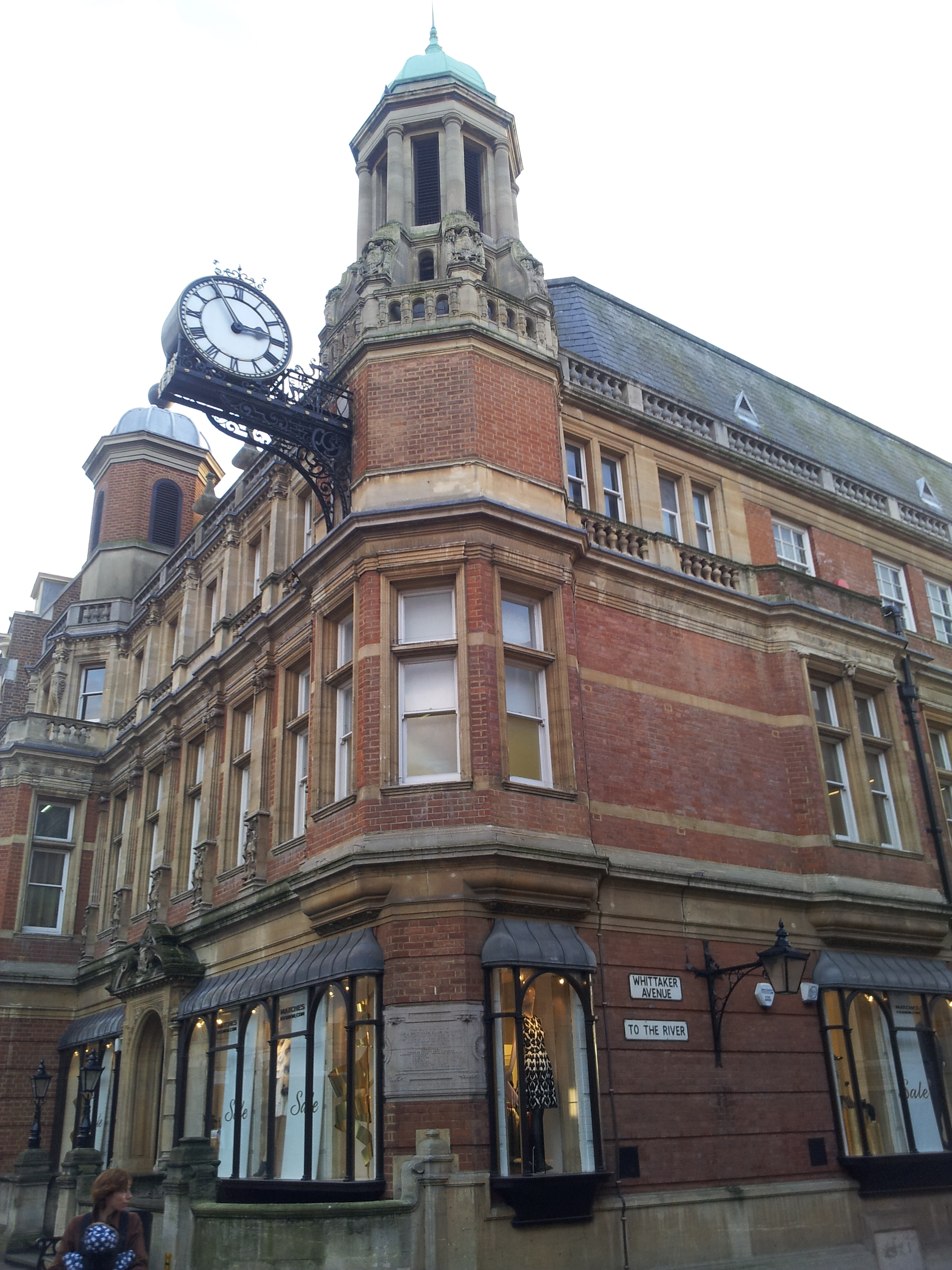
- The former town hall of Richmond which now houses the Reference Library and the Museum of Richmond
- Area
  - 1911: 2,491 acres
  - 1931: 2,491 acres
  - 1961: 4,109 acres
- Population
  - 1911: 33,221
  - 1931: 37,797
  - 1961: 41,024
- History
  - Origin: Parish of Richmond St Mary Magdalene
  - Created: 1890
  - Abolished: 1965
  - Succeeded by: London Borough of Richmond upon Thames
- Status: Municipal borough
- Government: Richmond Borough Council
  - HQ: Town Hall, Whittaker Avenue, Richmond
  - Motto: A Deo et Rege (From God and the King)
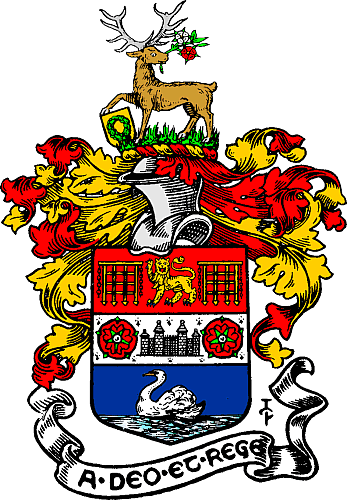

The Municipal Borough of Richmond or Richmond Municipal Borough was a municipal borough in Surrey, England from 1890 to 1965.

== History ==
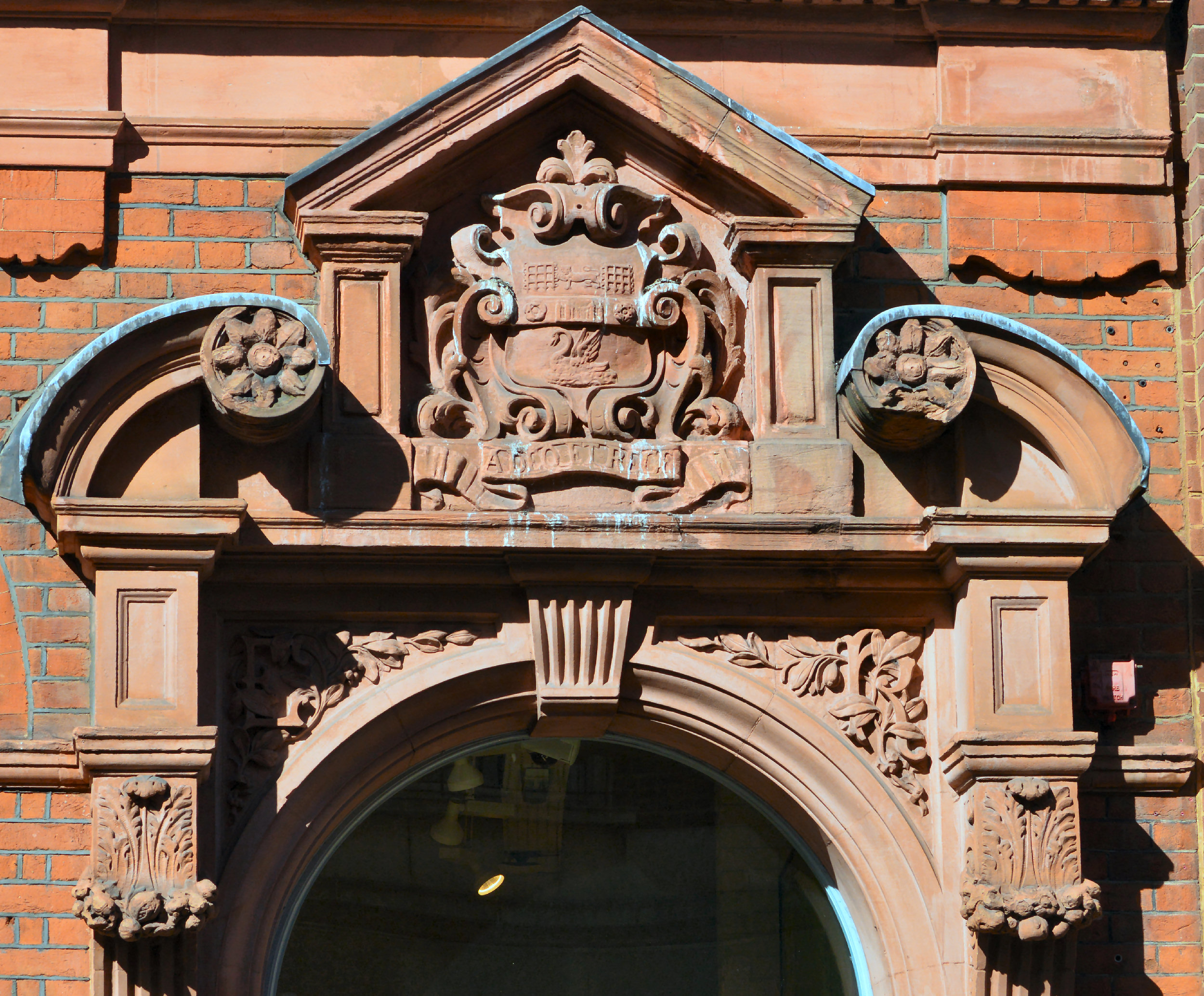
Facade of the former Post Office building in George Street, Richmond, showing the coat of arms of the former Municipal Borough of Richmond

The borough was created in 1890 under a Royal Charter, covering the parish of Richmond. This soon expanded with consent from Surrey County Council in 1892 to cover the parishes of Kew, Petersham and the North Sheen area of the parish of Mortlake. John Whittaker Ellis was its first mayor, and he purchased and provided the site in Richmond for a town hall; the street in which it is located is named Whittaker Avenue after him.

Under the Local Government Act 1894, parishes were no longer allowed to straddle borough boundaries and so the Mortlake civil parish was split, with the majority covering 1,554 acres (629 ha) outside the borough becoming the west of the Barnes Urban District and the part in the borough of Richmond, covering 329 acres (133 ha) forming a new North Sheen civil parish.

In 1933 the borough gained most of the former area of Ham Urban District, which had been an urban district since 1894.

The borough was abolished in 1965 when it was replaced by the larger London Borough of Richmond upon Thames, and Surrey County Council was replaced here by Greater London local government institutions, at which time the ceremonial county also changed.

== Notable former councillors and aldermen ==
- John Whittaker Ellis
- James Szlumper

== Coat of arms ==
The coat of arms of the borough was granted on 19 June 1891. The arms is per fess gules and azure on a fess ermine between in chief a lion passant guardant between two portcullises or and in base a swan argent upon water proper; a representation of the ancient Palace of Richmond proper between two roses gules barbed and seeded proper.

The crest was a stag regardant proper, holding in its mouth two roses on one stem, one argent, the other gules, and supporting with the dexter fore hoof a shield or a wreath vert.

The portcullises, roses and lion were all associated with King Henry VII, who brought the rival houses of Lancaster and York together and helped build the palace. The swan represented the River Thames. The stag represented Richmond Park and Old Deer Park, and the wreath the idea of municipality.

Today the arms may still be seen in five places in Richmond: on The Richmond Arms' pub sign in Princes Street; in the façade of the former post office in George Street; in the façade of the Old Town Hall in Whittaker Avenue, next to the clock above the entrance; on the Richmond War Memorial, which is near the Old Town Hall; and above the proscenium arch in the Richmond Theatre. There is also an example on display at the Museum of Richmond.

== See also ==
- Old Town Hall, Richmond
- Museum of Richmond
