= Old Town Hall, Richmond =

Municipal building in London, England

Old Town Hall
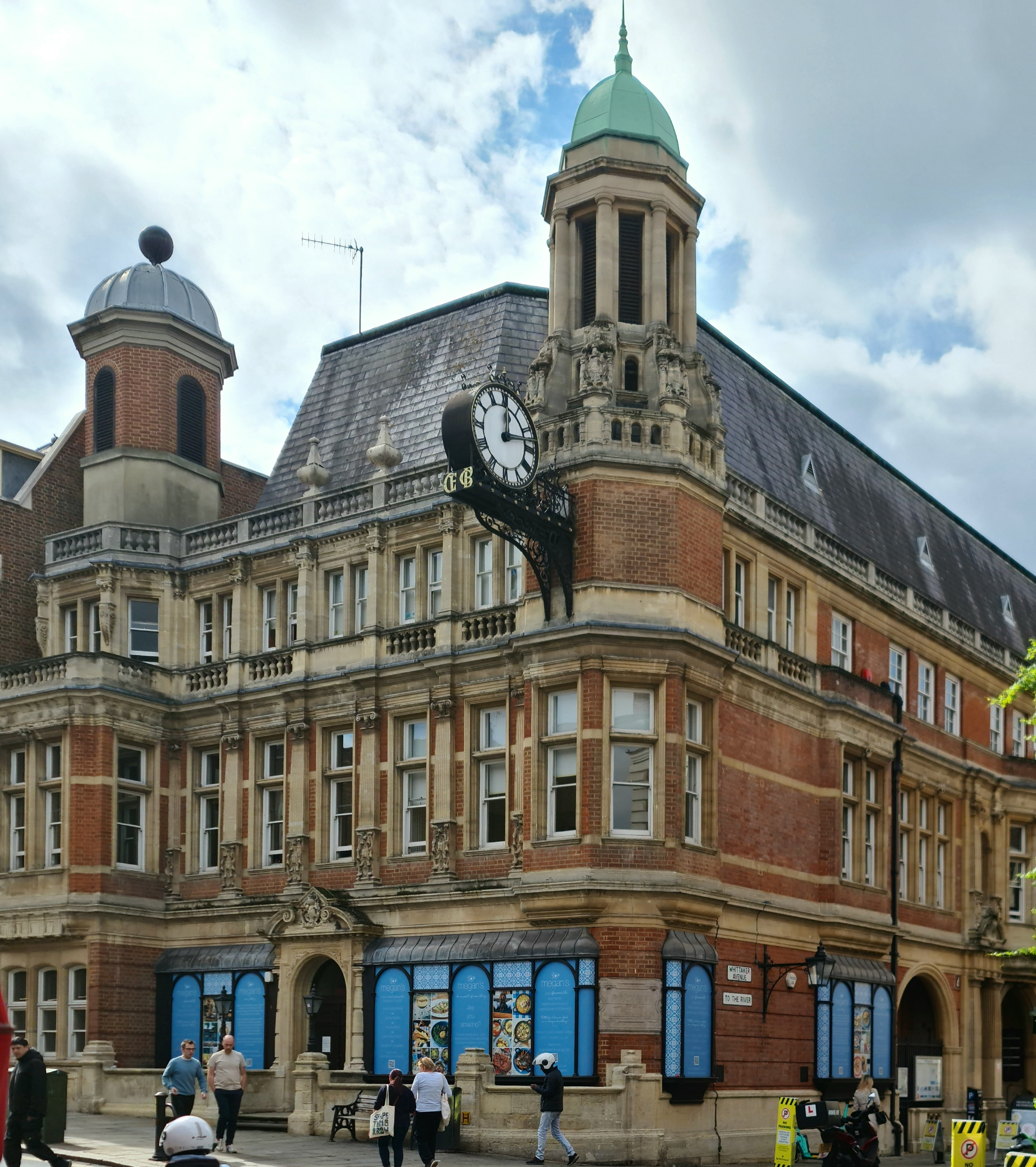

- Shown in Richmond upon Thames

General information
- Architectural style: "Elizabethan Renaissance"
- Location: Whittaker Avenue, Richmond, London
- Coordinates: 51°27′32″N 0°18′23″W
- Inaugurated: 1893
- Owner: London Borough of Richmond upon Thames

Design and construction
- Architect: W. J. Ancell

The Old Town Hall on Whittaker Avenue in Richmond, London, is a former municipal building which from 1893 to 1965 served as the town hall for the Municipal Borough of Richmond.

== History ==
In the 1870s the local vestry board, which performed local government functions, used a 19th-century vestry hall at 21 Paradise Road for their meetings. After the area became a municipal borough in 1890, civic leaders decided that this arrangement was inadequate for their needs and that they would procure a purpose-built town hall; the site chosen for the building was occupied by the Castle Hotel in Richmond, which was purchased by Sir John Whittaker Ellis, the local member of Parliament, and was donated by him to the Richmond Vestry in 1888.

The foundation stone for new building was laid in 1891. Designed by W. J. Ancell in the "Elizabethan Renaissance" style, it was built by Lansdowne & Company and was officially opened by the Duke of York on 10 June 1893. The design involved an asymmetrical main frontage with six bays facing onto Whittaker Street. The central section featured an arched entrance flanked by pilasters in the Doric order on the ground floor; there was an oriel window above the doorway with niches on either side, and three smaller windows above the entrance on the second floor. A turret was installed at the north-west corner of the building at roof level and a projecting clock, made by the Leeds firm of William Potts & Sons, was installed on the Hill Street frontage; a set of bells were provided by John Taylor & Co of Loughborough on which the clock chimed the quarters and struck the hours (but the council voted to discontinue use of the bells in 1952). The principal rooms were the council chamber and the mayor's parlour on the first floor. A bust of Sir John Whittaker Ellis by Francis John Williamson was unveiled by Mary Adelaide, Duchess of Teck on the staircase of the building in 1895.

The council chamber was completely gutted and other parts of the building badly damaged by a fire-bomb on 29 November 1940 during the Blitz; following a complete restoration to the designs of Gordon Jeeves, the building was reopened by Queen Elizabeth The Queen Mother on 16 December 1952.

The building continued to serve as the headquarters of the Municipal Borough of Richmond for much of the 20th century but ceased to be the local seat of government when the London Borough of Richmond upon Thames was formed in 1965. Instead York House in Twickenham performed that role for the new borough. The old town hall was refurbished as part of scheme to redevelop the riverside area to the designs of Quinlan Terry in 1988. Although some of the building's ground floor was subsequently leased for retail use, most of the former town hall was retained to accommodate the Central Reference Library and the Museum of Richmond, which was formally opened by Queen Elizabeth II on 28 October 1988. A section of the building was also converted into an art gallery (the Riverside Gallery) and Richmond Local Studies Library and Archive moved into the building in 2000.

== See also ==
- Museum of Richmond
