= Bill Potts =

Bill Potts may refer to:

- Bill Potts (musician) (1928–2005), American jazz pianist
- Bill Potts (lawyer), criminal lawyer and past president of Queensland Law Society
- Bill Potts (American football), American footballer who played in the 1934 Pittsburgh Pirates (NFL) season
- Bill Potts (Doctor Who), a fictional character in the British television series Doctor Who

== See also ==
- William Potts (disambiguation)
