= Bonny Lizie Baillie =

Traditional song

Bonny Lizie Baillie (Roud 341, Child 227) is an English-language folk song that some traditions claim recounts an actual historical courtship.

== Synopsis ==
Lizie Baillie meets a Highlander, Duncan Grahame, who courts her. She says she does not know how to work at a farm, and he promises to teach her. She will not have any Lowlander or Englishman, and though he brought her home, she could not forget him. They run away together, she giving up her silk dress for tartan, and marry. She assures her father that they have married, and leaves her family.

== See also ==
- Glasgow Peggie
- Lizie Lindsay
- Dugall Quin
- The Beggar-Laddie
