= Bill Potts (lawyer) =

Bill Potts is a Queensland criminal defence practitioner and a past president of Queensland Law Society. He is a founding director of Potts Lawyers Queensland's largest private criminal law firm. Since 2012 he has served as a Queensland Law Society Councillor, and was elected president 21 October 2015.

As president of the Queensland Law Society, Potts engaged in public commentary on enforcement of nightclub trading restrictions, lax enforcement of anti-bikie laws, defended the Queensland legal system from critical political commentary, and advocated for a restoration of federal funding for community legal aid.
