= Stone slab =

Flat, thin, and big stone

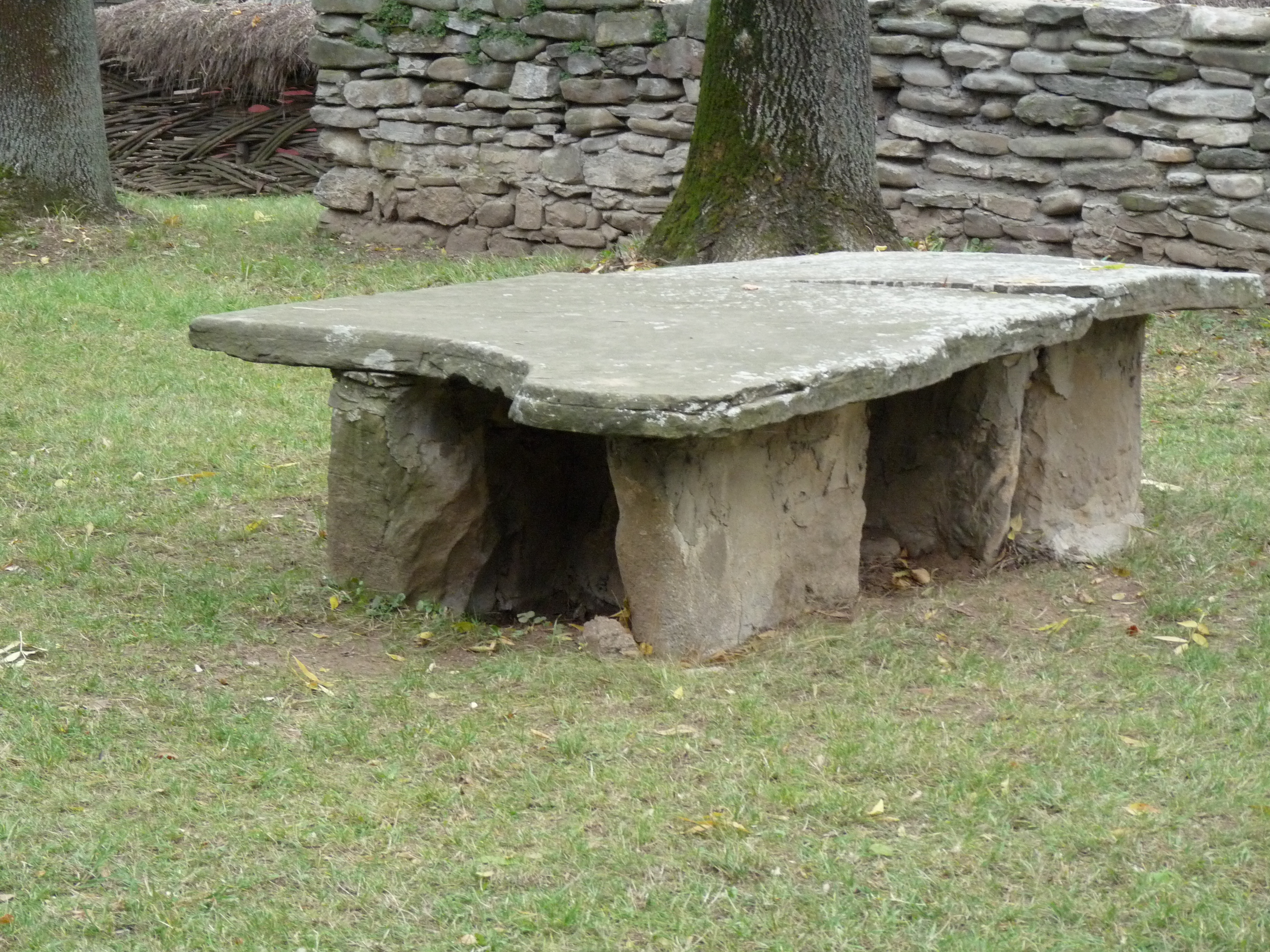
Stone table made of slabs.

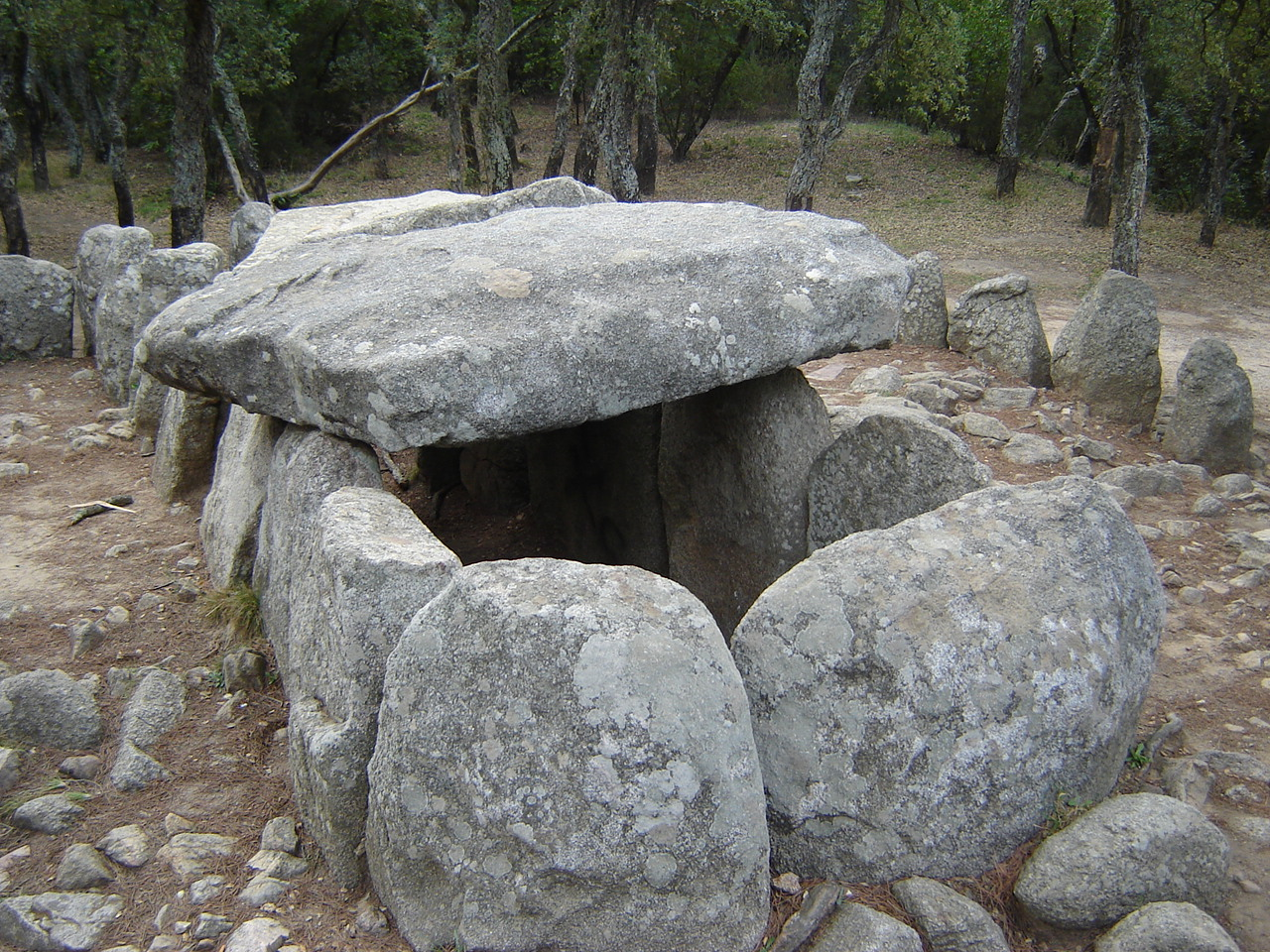
Dolmen made of stone-slabs Romanyà de la Selva (Baix Empordà).

A stone slab is a big stone, flat and relatively thin, often of rectangular or almost rectangular form. They are generally used for paving floors, for covering walls or as headstones.

== In dolmens ==
Most dolmen constructions were built using stone slabs of big dimensions. Their architecture often includes a corridor of access that can be constructed using stone slabs or dry stones. The burial chamber, with variable shapes (e.g. rectangular, polygonal, oval, circular) can also be preceded by an anteroom. In some dolmens, the entrance has a door cut into one or more vertical stone slabs.

== In construction ==
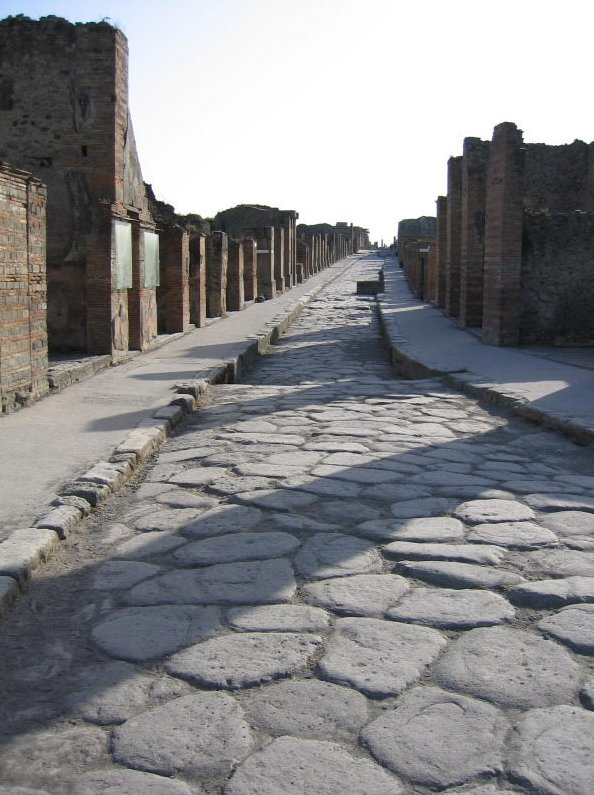
Floor with slabs in a street of Pompeii

The main applications of the slabs as material of construction are for pavings and in the construction of roofs. They can be employed for other uses, among them:

- Balconies formed from a slab
- Dry stone constructions of: walls, caves, rooms.
- The base of some fireplaces are built with stone slabs (a big one or some smaller together).
- In religious altars, the altar stone can be a stone slab, more or less elaborated or in its natural state.
- In rustic tables

== In gastronomy ==
One system of cooking is cooking "to the slab". Similar to the systems of "to the iron" or "grilled", in the procedure to bake to the slab the foods (e.g. meat, fish, vegetables) are put on a slab heated on a fire with oil, butter or lard and other garnishings.

- This system was rather popular in zones of the Pyrenees and often practised by farmers and shepherds. At present it can consider incorporated to the gastronomy of all the levels.

== Grave slabs ==
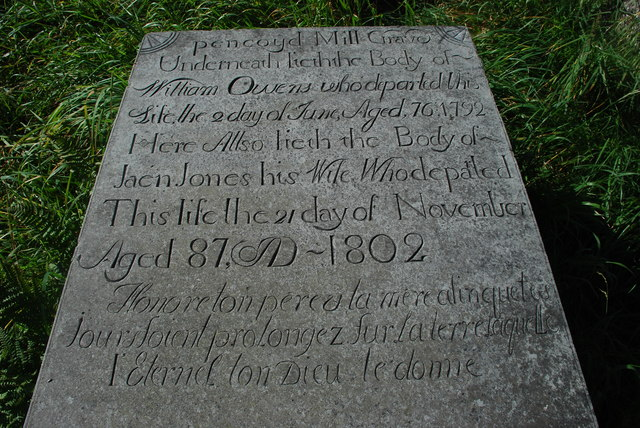
Multilingual grave slab: Welsh, English, French

From prehistoric times there have been examples of graves covered with a stone slab, in its natural state or carved. This use of slabs as tombstone has extended the concept of natural slab to the tombstone variant: flat, thin and polished. An instance is the slab in the tomb of King Pere el Gran of Aragon, which weighs 900 kg.

Such tombstones usually have inscriptions. This traditionally includes the name of the deceased, date of birth and/or death. The inscriptions are generally on a frontal side but also in some cases in the verso (on the top side) and around the edges. Some families commission or make an inscription on the underside. Some also have epitaphs: in praise (eulogies); citations of religious texts, such as "Requiescat in pace"; sentiments or quotations.

A pyramidal or "hipped" stone slab, sometimes surmounting another base or fuller sarcophagus is a design seen across all continents as most organic debris will fall off of this and overgrowth from moss, grass and akin lowest-level plants. Examples are the graves of Sir John Whittaker Ellis and of the 1st Baron Cozens-Hardy.

== Washboards ==
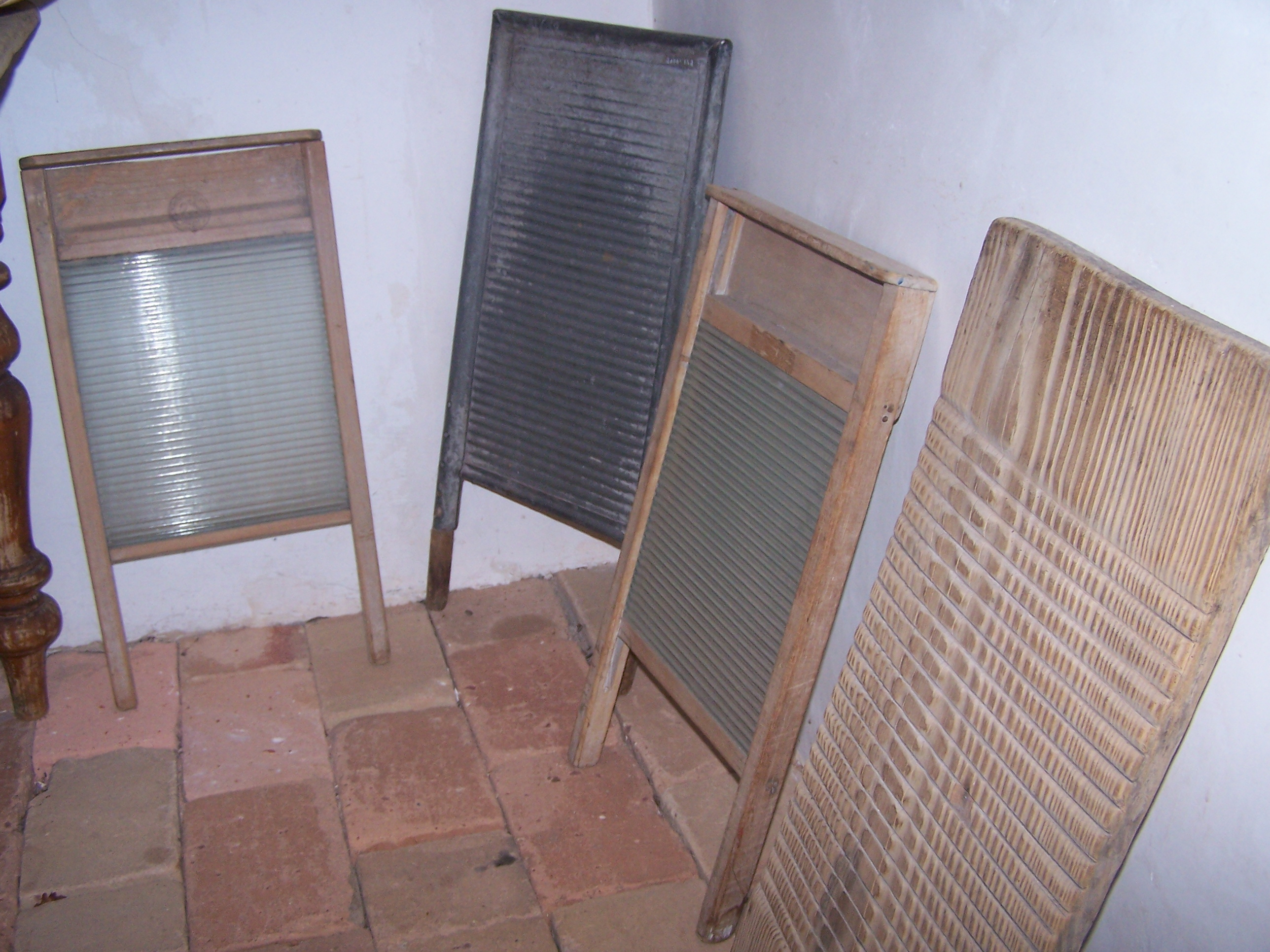
Different types of washboards

Washing clothes is a basic need in civilised societies and, in general, in all the parts of the world. In primitive periods—before running water, washing machines and detergents—it was necessary to go to wash clothes at the river bank or in a laundry room.

Clothes were washed manually, by rubbing and sometimes striking them against a hard surface with soap. The aim was to penetrate the mix of water and soap between the fibres of the fabric to pull out the dirt. The slabs to wash the clothes were slabs of natural stone chosen to present a fine and relatively flat surface. The small rounded irregularities could help of friction in the washing process.

- In some cases "artificial slabs" were made especially, in which the friction surface was wood, although the apparatus was still called "washing slab".
- There were also "artificial slabs" made with an undulated steel sheet. (These types of washboards have been used as percussion instruments in jazz and blues bands).
- The wash to the stone of cowboys trousers and similar clothes is a stone washing process that uses the friction of some parts of the clothes against a coarse stone (or similar). The aim is to achieve a change of appearance of the clothes, imitating natural wear.

== As hunting traps ==
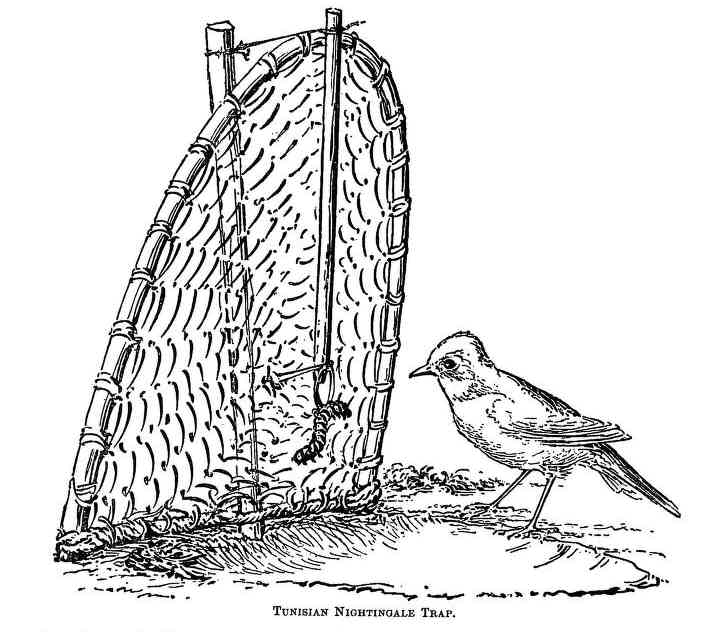
Tunisian trap to hunt live birds. A slab-trap is very much alike but more conclusive.

Hunting with slabs is a system of hunting by means of a slab-trap. The fundamental part of the device is a slab. Preparing this trap was a delicate task.

- Preparation of the trap: A slab of suitable dimensions is held in a raised position forming an appropriate angle with the horizontal. The slab, in unstable position, held in place by means of a few twigs or branches in a particular state, a state that can be called "ready to be triggered" (or at the trigger point). Once the slab is ready, one needs to put a suitable bait to attract the animal that wants to capture.
- When the animal (e.g. bird, rabbit) tries to eat the bait, the slab falls on top of the animal and the animal gets trapped (or crushed).

== The term "slab" in toponyms ==
From the term slab and its derivatives, there are many toponyms among them.

== See also ==
- Flagstone, a generic flat stone
- Headstone, placed over a grave
- Sandstone, type of sedimentary rock
- Slate, fine-grained, foliated, homogeneous, low-grade metamorphic rock
