= Pott (surname) =

Pott is a surname of Old English origin, which is a variant of Potts. The surname may refer to:

- Aaron Pott (born 1967), American winemaker
- Alfred Pott (1822–1908), British archdeacon
- Alida Jantina Pott (1888–1931), Dutch artist
- August Friedrich Pott (1802–1887), German linguist
- Carol Pott (born 1964), American writer
- Constance Mary Pott (1862–1957), English printmaker
- Francis Pott (composer) (born 1957), British musician
- Francis Pott (hymnwriter) (1832–1909), English Anglican priest and author of Christian hymns
- Francis Lister Hawks Pott (1864–1947), American educator
- Fritz Pott (1939–2015), German footballer
- George F. Pott Jr. (1943–2001), American politician
- Gladys Pott (1867–1961), English anti-suffragist and civil servant
- Herbert Pott (1883–1953), British Olympic diver
- Joel Pott (born 1979), British musician
- Johann Heinrich Pott (1692–1777), Prussian physician and chemist
- John Pott (died 1645), English doctor and politician
- Johnny Pott (born 1935), American golfer
- Joseph Pott (1759–1847), British Anglican archdeacon
- Julia Pott (born 1985), British animator
- Karel Pott (1904–1953), Portuguese Olympic sprinter
- Konstantin Pott (born 1997), German politician
- Lisa von Pott (1888–?), Austrian Nazi spy, sculptor and secretary to the poet Rabindranath Tagore
- Nellie Pott (1899–1963), American baseball pitcher
- Percivall Pott (1714–1788), British surgeon
- Percivall Pott (politician) (1908–1964), British politician
- Reginald H. Pott (1870–1957), British politician and stockbroker
- Reino Pott (1869–1965), Dutch-born South African botanist and chemist
- Thomas Pott, 17th century Scottish servant to James VI and I

== Fictional characters ==
- Caractacus Pott, in the Ian Fleming novel Chitty-Chitty-Bang-Bang
- Jack Pott, in the comics Cor!! and Buster

== See also ==
- Pott (disambiguation)
- Potter (name)
- Potts (disambiguation)
