= William Potts =

William Potts may refer to:

- William Potts (inventor) (1883–1947), American policeman and inventor of modern traffic lights
- William E. Potts (1921–2005), American army general
- William Estel Potts (1935–2004), American army general
- William Potts (1809–?), British clockmaker and founder of Potts of Leeds

== See also ==
- Bill Potts (disambiguation), several people
- William Potts Dewees (1768–1841), American obstetrician and medical writer
