= Museum of Richmond =

Coordinates: 51°27′32″N 0°18′24″W

- Established: 1988; 38 years ago
- Location: Old Town Hall, Whittaker Avenue, Richmond, London
- Type: Local history museum
- Collection size: More than 5000 objects
- Founder: John Cloake
- Chair of trustees: Dr Nicola Mann
- Curator: Gary Enstone
- Public transit access: Richmond
- Website: www.museumofrichmond.com

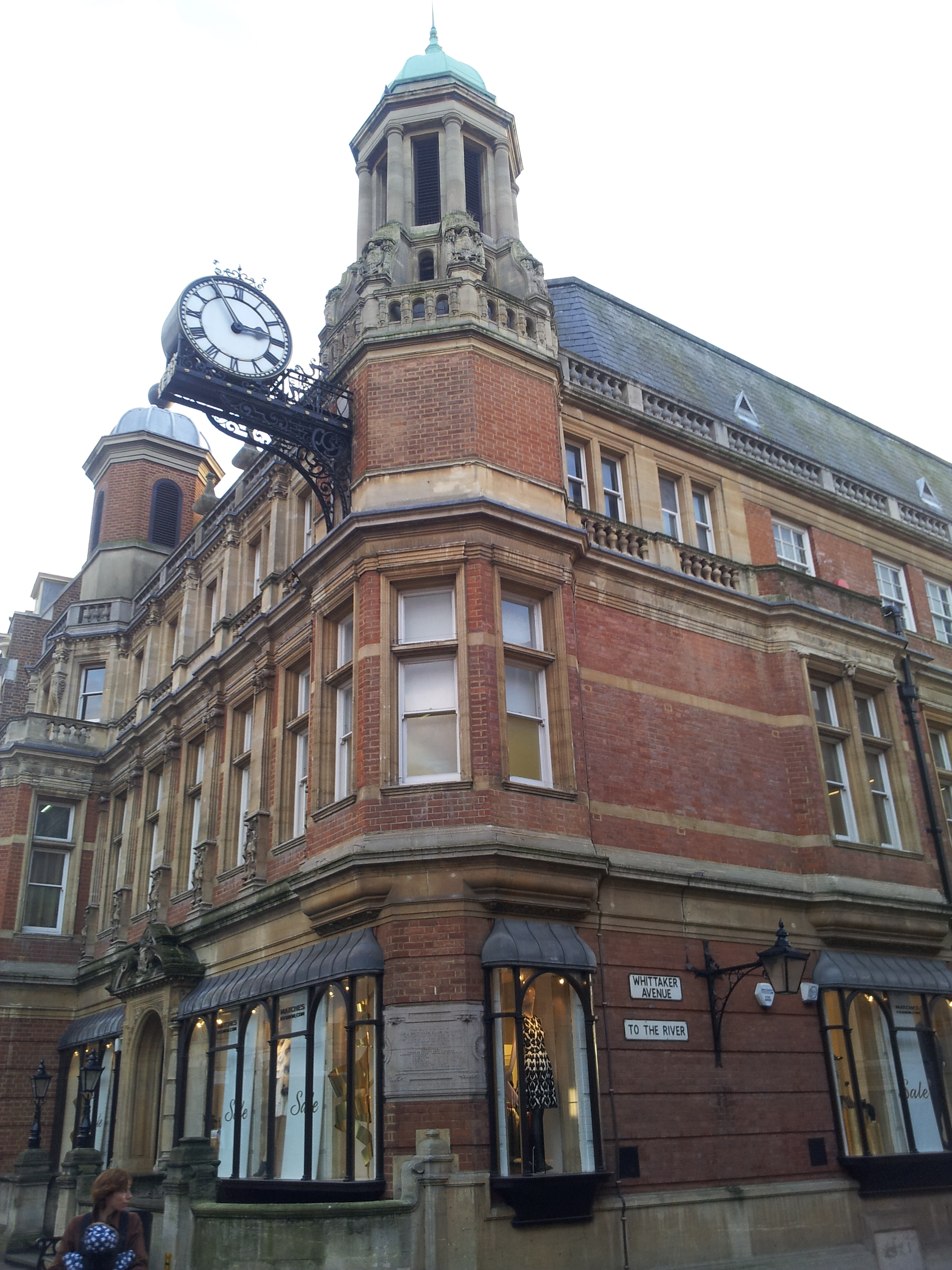
The museum is located at the Old Town Hall, Richmond.

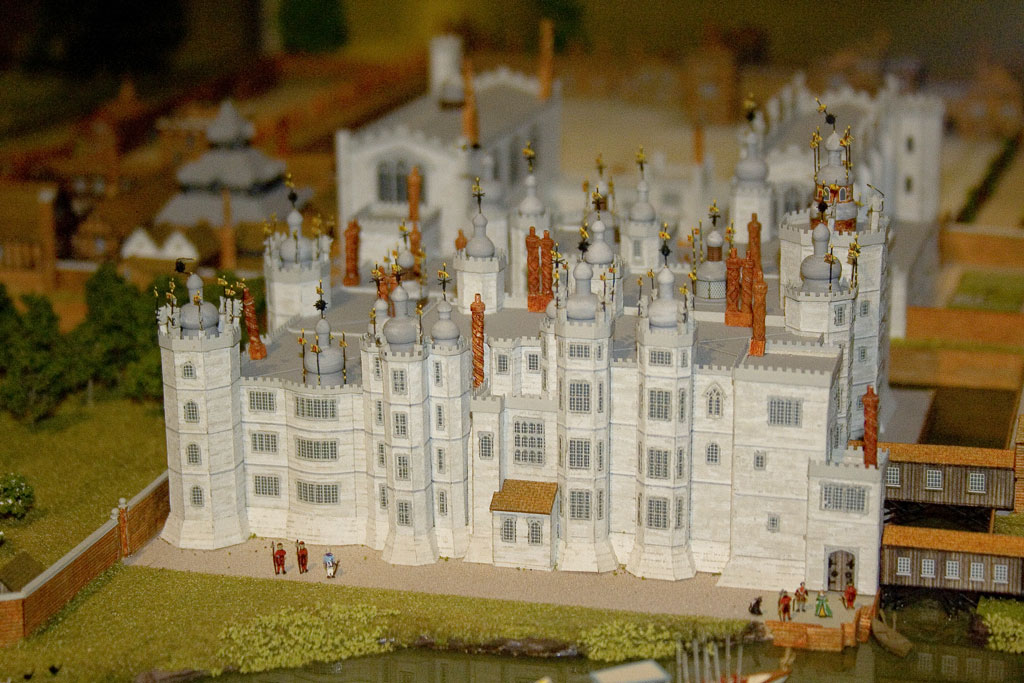
A model of Richmond Palace is on permanent display at the museum.

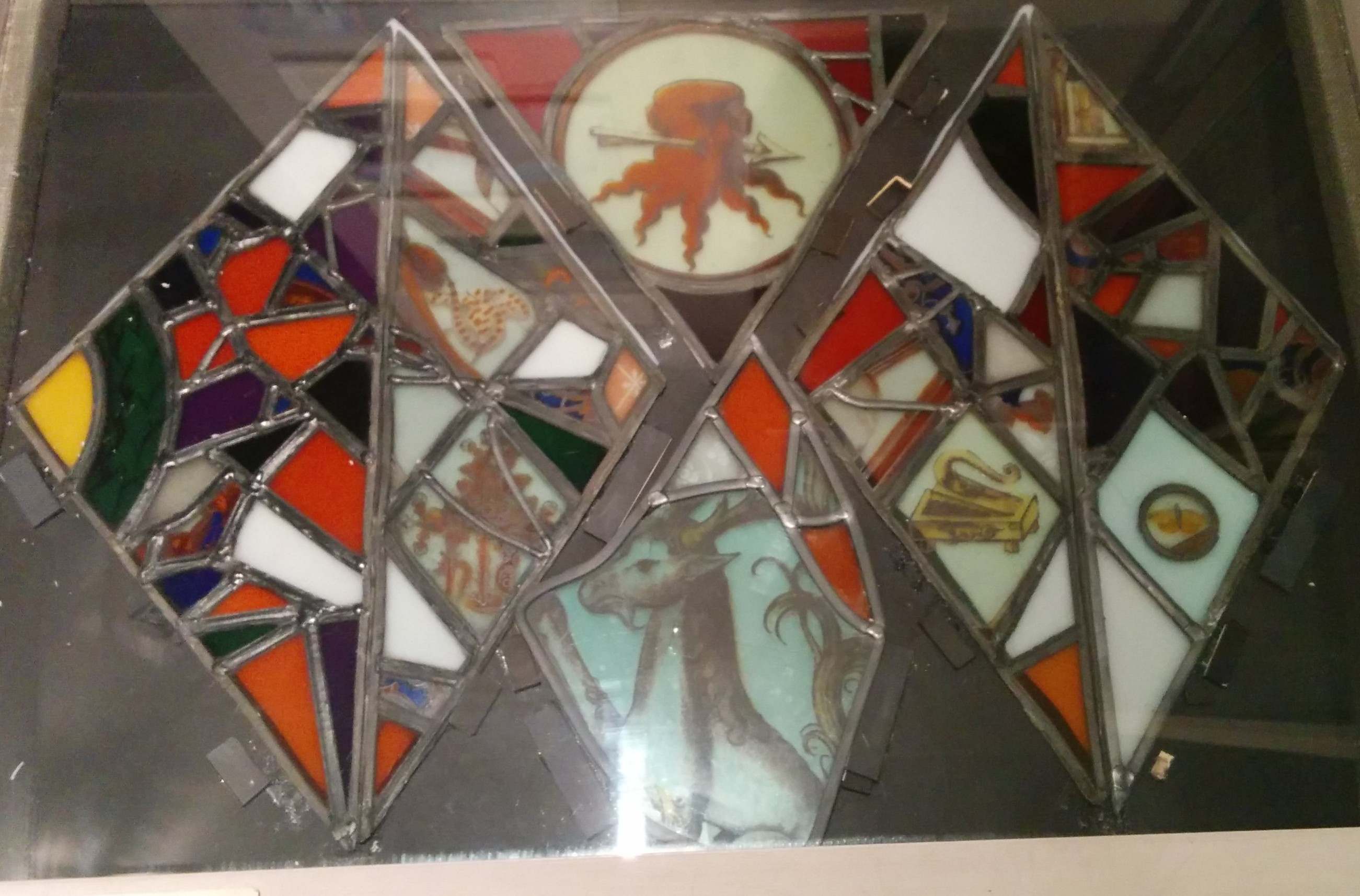
This window glass fragment from Richmond Palace is in the museum's permanent display.

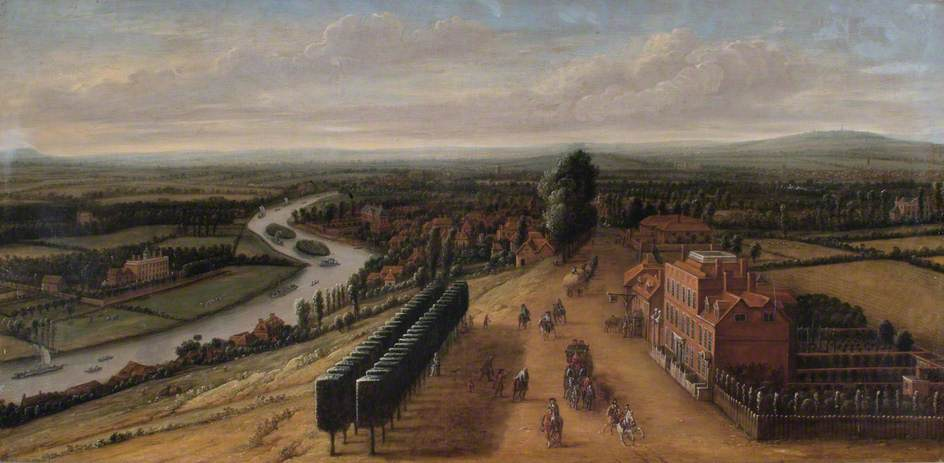
One of the museum's highlights is The Terrace and View from Richmond Hill, Surrey by Dutch draughtsman and painter Leonard Knyff (1650–1722).

The Museum of Richmond in the London Borough of Richmond upon Thames is located in Richmond's Old Town Hall, close to Richmond Bridge. It was formally opened by Queen Elizabeth II on 28 October 1988.

An independent museum and a registered charity, (Note: The museum is registered with the Charity Commission for England and Wales as charity number 295164. "The Museum of Richmond". Charity profile. Charities Aid Foundation.) it is supported by Richmond upon Thames Borough Council. Dr Nicola Mann, a professor in the department of communications & the arts at Richmond American University London, chairs the board of trustees; John Lee, Baron Lee of Trafford, is deputy chair and Susanne Lap is vice-chair. Gary Enstone, who also chairs The Kipling Society, is the museum's curator and executive officer.

The museum's permanent displays, from medieval times to the present day, relate to the history of Richmond, Kew, Petersham and Ham which, until local government boundary changes in 1965, formed the Municipal Borough of Richmond (Surrey). Its temporary exhibitions, education activities and resources, and a programme of events (including events for families and children) cover the whole of the modern borough. The museum's highlights include: 16th-century glass from Richmond Palace; a model of Richmond Palace; and a painting, The Terrace and View from Richmond Hill, Surrey by Dutch draughtsman and painter Leonard Knyff (1650–1722), which is part of the Richmond upon Thames Borough Art Collection.

The museum organises a programme of talks. Admission to the museum, which is open from Tuesdays to Saturdays, is free.

== History ==
The museum was created in 1983 by local residents led by local historian John Cloake (who was the museum's first chairman). Its first curator (from 1987 to 1989) was Kate Thaxton.

== Exhibitions ==
The museum's current temporary exhibition, From the Stores: Forgotten Posters and Found Treasures, supported by the Asgill House Trust, opened in October 2026 and will continue until spring 2027.

=== Previous ===
The museum's previous exhibitions include:

==== 2020s ====
- 2026 Threads Through Time: Community Quilts in Richmond
- 2025–26 Trailblazing Women – Richmond's Sporting Superstars, featuring tennis players Kitty Godfree (1896–1992), Betty Nuthall (1911–1983) and Gem Hoahing (1920–2015), and golfer Pamela Barton (1917–1943), all of them from what is now the London Borough of Richmond upon Thames
- 2024–25 Wish You Were Here: From Horace Walpole to Ted Lasso, about tourism in Richmond
- 2023–24 Artificial Silk: From Kew to the World, about viscose rayon, which was invented in Kew at the beginning of the 20th century
- 2022–23 Richmond Remembers: 100 Years of the Poppy Factory, which was founded in 1922 to offer employment opportunities to wounded soldiers returning from the First World War and moved to Richmond in 1926
- 2021–22 OT50 – Fifty Years of the Orange Tree Theatre, founded in 1971 in a small room above the Orange Tree pub opposite the present building, which opened in 1991 and was built specifically as a theatre in the round The exhibition is also available online.
- 2021 The King's Observatory: Richmond's Science Story, about the history of the King's Observatory in Old Deer Park. The observatory was completed in 1769, in time for King George III's observation of the transit of Venus that occurred on 3 June in that year.
- 2020–21 Queen's Road: 500 Years of History, about Queen's Road, Richmond, a historic road that runs from Sheen Road to the top of Richmond Hill. As physical access to the museum was affected by government restrictions imposed during the COVID-19 pandemic, a digital version was also produced.

==== 2010s ====
- 2019–20 Celebrating 800 years of St. Mary Magdalene at the heart of Richmond, about Richmond's historic parish church
- 2018–19 Museum of Richmond 30th anniversary exhibition: 30 years, 30 people, 30 objects
- 2018 Archaeology: Richmond's Prehistory
- 2017–18 Poverty, which looked at Richmond from 1600 to 1948, from the perspective of people who were poor, and included the history of the town's workhouse and almshouses and the effects of the Poor Laws
- 2017 Old Palace Lane: Medieval to Modern Richmond
- 2016–17 The Royal Star & Garter: 100 Years of Care, marking the centenary of the founding, in Richmond, of the first Star and Garter Home
- 2015–16 The Battle of Britain 75 years on – Richmond Remembers the Second World War
- 2014–15 1914–1918 Richmond at Home and at War: Local stories and their international links, Richmond's experience of the First World War
- 2014 Encountering the Unchartered and back – Three explorers: Ball, Vancouver and Burton, telling the story of explorers Henry Lidgbird Ball, George Vancouver and Richard Burton and their connections with Richmond
- 2013 Living and Dying in 19th Century Richmond, exploring the lives of some of Richmond's 19th-century residents
- 2012–13 The Building of a Borough, showcasing building plans held in the London Borough of Richmond upon Thames’ Local Studies Collection
- 2012 Royal Minstrels to Rock and Roll: 500 years of music-making in Richmond
- 2012 Happy and Glorious: popular Royal celebration and commemoration in Richmond
- 2010–11 Richmond Theatre: Through the Stages, celebrating the history of Richmond Theatre, which opened in 1899 and was designed by theatre architect Frank Matcham
- 2010 How the Vote Was Won: Art, Theatre and Women's Suffrage

==== 2000s ====
- 2009–10 Richmond – From Page to Screen
- 2009 From Henry VII to Henry VIII, marking the 500th anniversary of the death of Henry VII at Richmond Palace and the accession to the throne of his son Henry VIII
- 2007 The Two Richmonds – A Celebration of their Twinning, marking the 400th anniversary of the founding of Jamestown and the twinning relationship of Richmond, Surrey and Richmond, Virginia

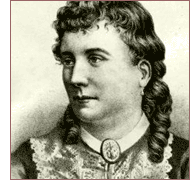
Mary Braddon

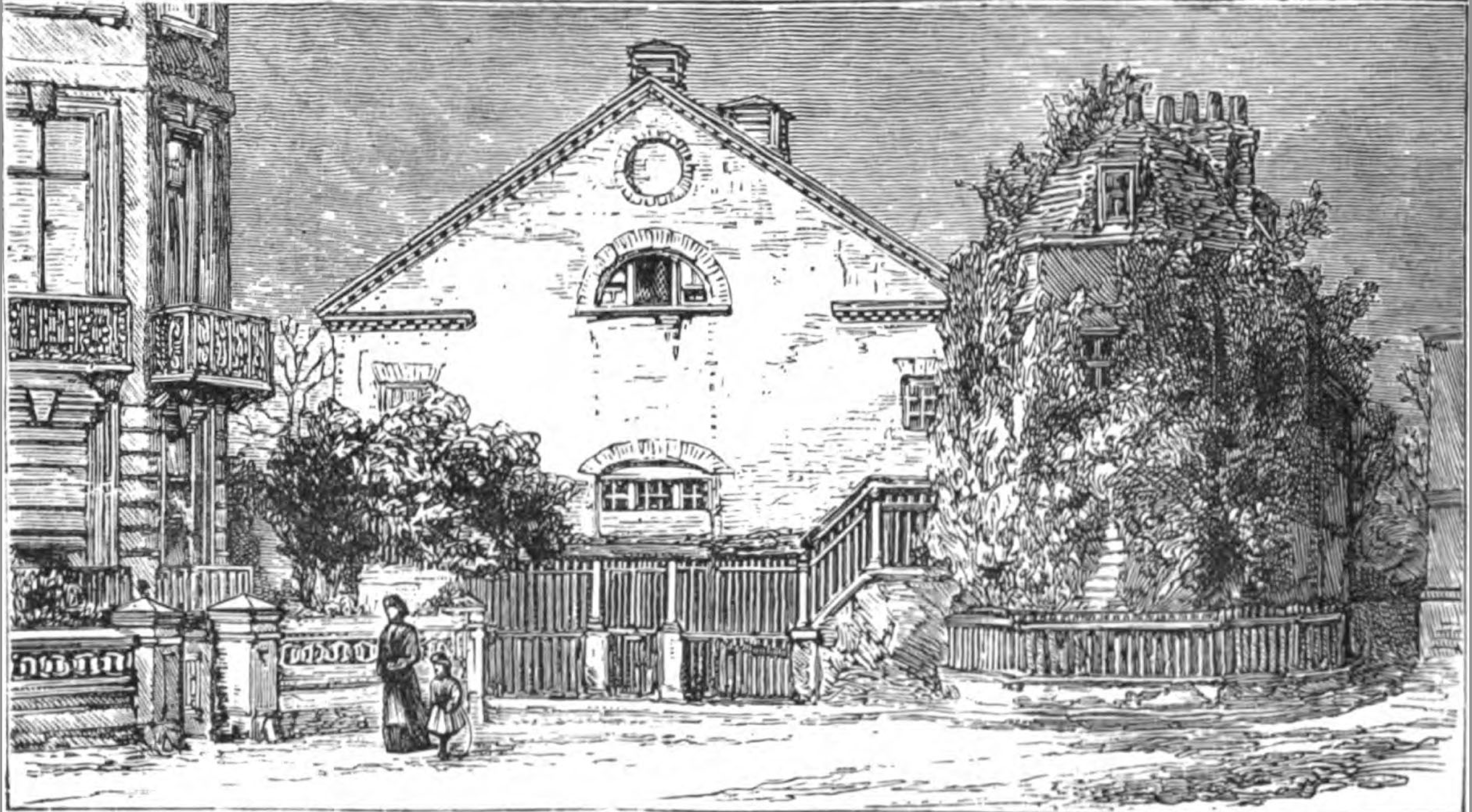
Exterior of the Richmond Theatre and Edmund Kean's house. Kean was manager of the Richmond Theatre from 1831 until his death in 1833. The theatre, built in 1765, was demolished in 1884. Its name was later used for the current theatre on Richmond Green, which opened in 1899.

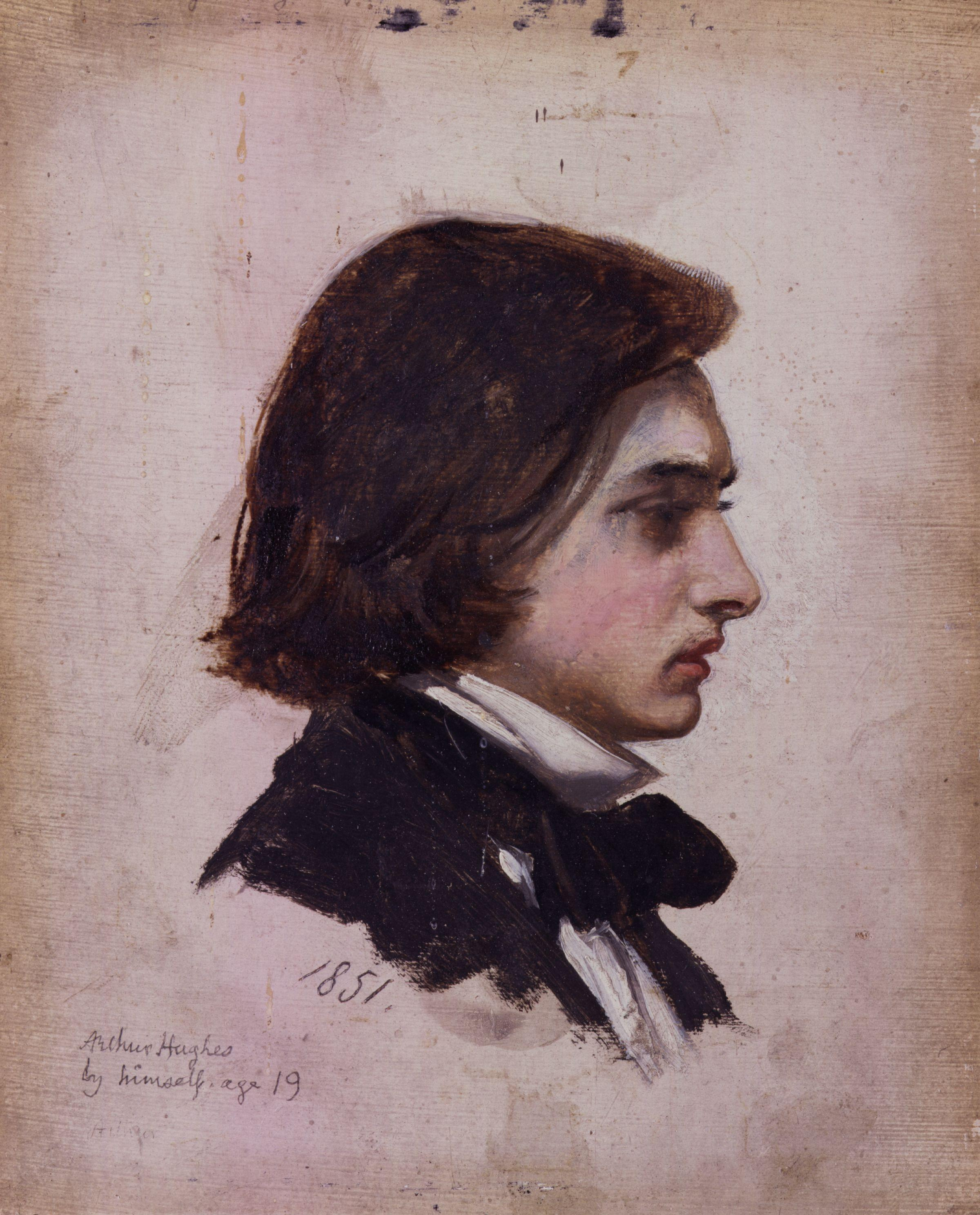
Self-portrait of the artist Arthur Hughes

- 2007 Trading in Human Lives: The Richmond Connection, on Richmond and the slave trade
- 2006–07 Men Remade: Paul Drury's War in Richmond, featuring the work, particularly during the Second World War, of the artist and printmaker Paul Drury (1903–1987)
- 2006 A Rich Heritage, featuring items from the borough's Local Studies Collection
- 2005–06 Turner-Upon-Thames, focusing on the period when the artist J. M. W. Turner (1775–1851) lived in Isleworth and in Twickenham
- 2005 Barnes & Mortlake Past, celebrating 50 years of the founding of Barnes and Mortlake History Society
- 2004–05 Britflicks-on-Thames: Film Studios of the Borough and Beyond
- 2004 The Sensational Miss Braddon, about the author Mary Braddon (1835–1915) who lived and died in Richmond and is best known for her 1862 sensation novel Lady Audley's Secret
- 2003 Without Exception, a selection of original prints by Thomas Rowlandson of The English Dance of Death (1815–16)
- 2003 The Virgin Queen in Richmond, marking the 400th anniversary of the death, at Richmond Palace, of Elizabeth I
- 2002 The Fight To Save The View, marking the 100th anniversary of the Richmond, Petersham and Ham Open Spaces Act which has protected the view from Richmond Hill
- 2002 Stage by Stage: Richmond's Theatrical Heritage, looking at theatres in Richmond since the Elizabethan era
- 2001–02 Richmond's River: Pictures of and inspired by the Thames in Richmond
- 2000 From Canvas to Camera: George Hilditch 1803–1857 George Hilditch (1803–1857) was a British artist known for his landscape paintings. He particularly specialised in producing landscapes from or around Richmond Hill and became known as the "Richmond painter". He also worked in the new art of photography.

==== 1990s ====
- 1998–99 Arthur Hughes: The Last Pre-Raphaelite, about the Pre-Raphaelite artist Arthur Hughes, who died at his house on Kew Green in 1915 and is buried in Richmond Cemetery
- 1997–98 Richmond Women: Face to Face, famous women who lived in Richmond
- 1997 The Henry Doulton Legacy: 120 Years of Royal Doulton
- 1997 The Best Years of Our Lives? Going to school in Richmond – reminiscences of Richmond school days
- 1996–97 Spencer Gore in Richmond, about the artist Spencer Gore who lived in Richmond and died there in 1914
- 1995–96 Past & Present: The Changing Face of Richmond
- 1995 Going Shopping!
- 1995 The Artist's Inspiration: Views of Richmond upon Thames

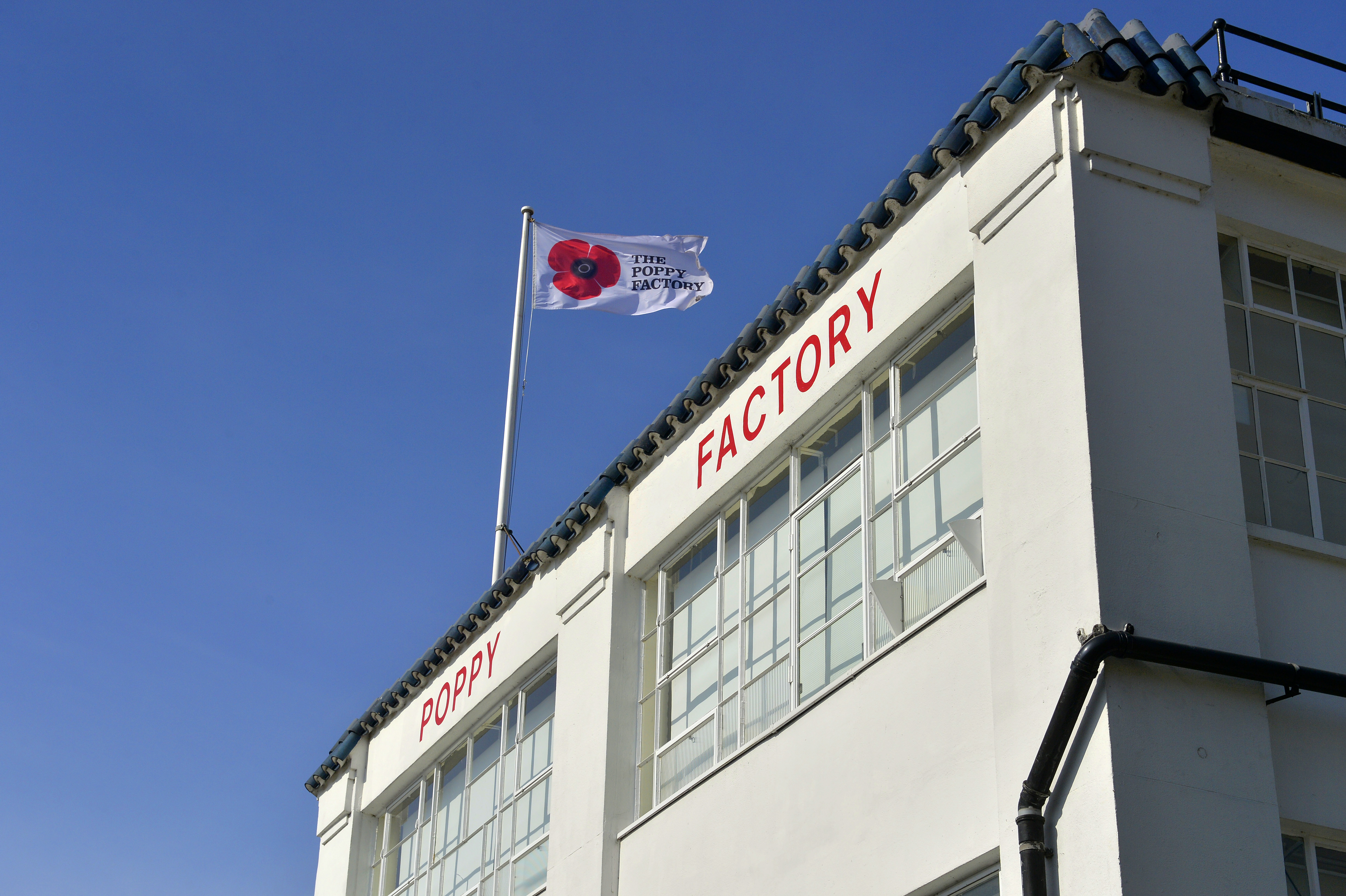
The Poppy Factory's headquarters in Richmond

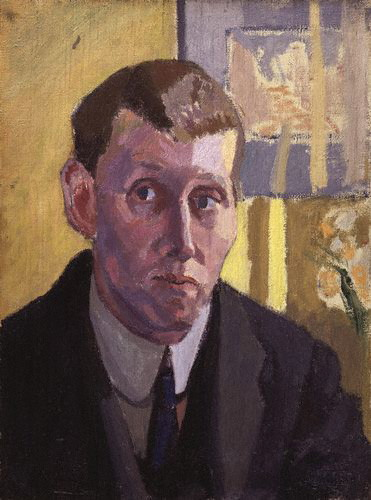
Self-portrait of the artist Spencer Gore

- 1994–95 The Factory of Remembrance: The Poppy & the Royal British Legion Poppy Factory
- 1994 Father & Son: The Art of Roland & Bernard Batchelor. Roland Batchelor (1889–1990) and his son Bernard (1924–2012), who was born in Teddington, were both watercolour artists; Roland was also a draughtsman and a printmaker.
- 1994 'Simplest Country Gentlefolk': The Royal Family at Kew 1727–1841
- 1993–94 Prospects About Richmond: mid-18th century drawings and prints by Augustin Heckel
- 1993 Richmond at War: The Civilian Experience 1939–45
- 1992 Mr K: The legend of Edmund Kean. Edmund Kean (1787–1833) was actor-manager of the original Richmond Theatre on Richmond Green from 1831 until his death in 1833. He is buried at Richmond's historic parish church, St Mary Magdalene.
- 1992 Farewell Ice-Rink, marking the closure that year of Richmond Ice Rink which, when it opened in 1928, had the longest ice surface in any indoor rink in the world
- 1991–92 Mr Rowlandson's Richmond: Thomas Rowlandson's Drawings of Richmond-upon-Thames, about the artist and caricaturist Thomas Rowlandson (1757–1827), who was noted for his political satire and social observation
- 1991 The Richmond Royal Horse Show, an event held regularly in Richmond from 1892 to 1967
- 1991 Virginia Woolf and the Hogarth Press in Richmond 1914–1924

==== 1980s ====
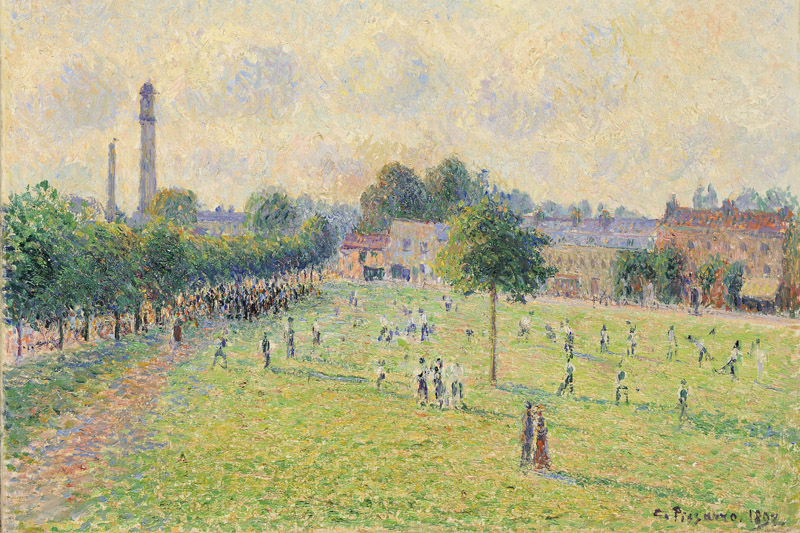
Kew Green. French painter Camille Pissarro's impression of Kew Green in 1892

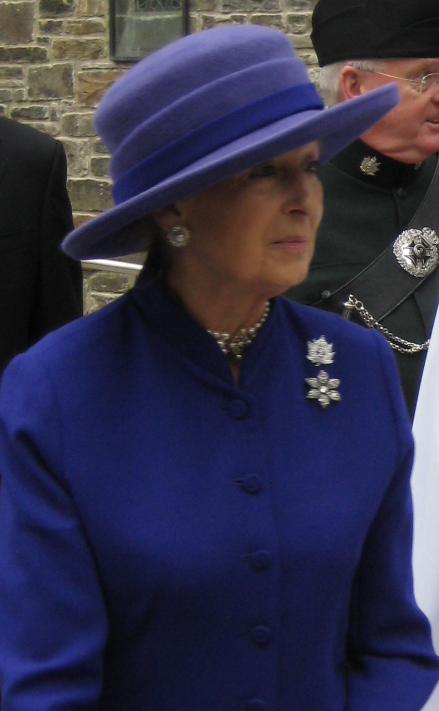
Princess Alexandra, the museum's Royal Patron

- 1989 Pissarro in Richmond, about Camille Pissarro (1830–1903) and other artists in his family who lived in Kew and Richmond

== Publications ==
The museum's publications include:

- Robinson, Derek (2019). The Richmond Vicars: the ministers of St Mary Magdalene and their role in the community, 106pp. ISBN 978-09-51854-92-1
- Robinson, Derek; Fowler, Simon (2017). Old Palace Lane: Medieval to Modern Richmond, 44pp. Published jointly with the Richmond Local History Society. ISBN 978-09-55071-79-9. A second edition (48pp; ISBN 978-19-12314-02-7) was published in 2020.
- Boyes, Valerie (ed.) (2014). Encountering the Uncharted and Back – three explorers: Ball, Vancouver and Burton, 24pp.
- Boyes, Valerie (with contributions from Govett, John) (2013). Living and Dying in 19th Century Richmond, 25pp.
- Boyes, Valerie (with contributions from Cloake, John and Paytress, Mark) (2012). Royal Minstrels to Rock and Roll: 500 years of music-making in Richmond, 28pp.
- Boyes, Valerie (ed.) (2009). Richmond on Page and Screen, 36pp.
- Moses, John; Cloake, John (2007). The Two Richmonds: a celebration of their twinning, the American connection, 14pp. OCLC 143627273
- Boyes, Valerie (2007). Trading in Human Lives: The Richmond Connection, 28pp.
- Moses, John (2005). Turner-upon-Thames, 13pp.
- Roberts, Leonard; Wildman, Stephen (1999). Arthur Hughes: The Last Pre-Raphaelite, 48pp. ISBN 978-18-51493-17-3
- Gore, Frederick (1996). Spencer Gore in Richmond: an exhibition at the Museum of Richmond 10 September 1996 to 25 January 1997, 44pp. ISBN 09-51854-91-7
- Museum of Richmond (1994). Simplest Country Gentlefolk: Royal Family at Kew, 1727–1841, 36pp. ISBN 978-09-51854-91-4
- Jeffree, Richard (1991). Mr Rowlandson's Richmond: Thomas Rowlandson's Drawings of Richmond-upon-Thames, 89pp. ISBN 09-51854-90-9

== Patrons ==
Princess Alexandra is the museum's royal patron. Its other patrons are: author and broadcaster Anita Anand; broadcaster and naturalist Sir David Attenborough; businesswoman Ann Chapman-Daniel; Richmond hotelier Greville Dare; actor, writer and producer Julian Fellowes, Lord Fellowes of West Stafford; Petina Hauptfuhrer, custodian of Asgill House; novelist and screenwriter Anthony Horowitz; and biographer, lecturer and journalist Anne Sebba.

== See also ==
- Orleans House Gallery
- Richmond Local History Society
- Twickenham Museum
