= John Whittaker Ellis =

British Member of Parliament

Sir John Whittaker Ellis Bt JP
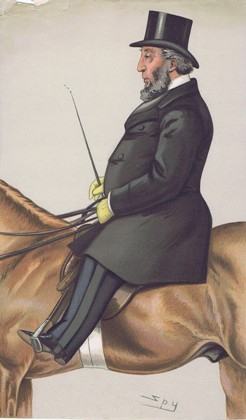
- Caricature by Spy published in Vanity Fair in 1882.

Lord Mayor of the City of London
- In office 1881–1882
- Preceded by: William McArthur
- Succeeded by: Henry Knight

Personal details
- Born: 25 January 1829
- Died: 20 September 1912 (aged 83)
- Party: Conservative
- Spouse(s): (1) Mary Ann Staples (d. 1901) (2) Marian Bailey
- Education: Rev. William Allan's School

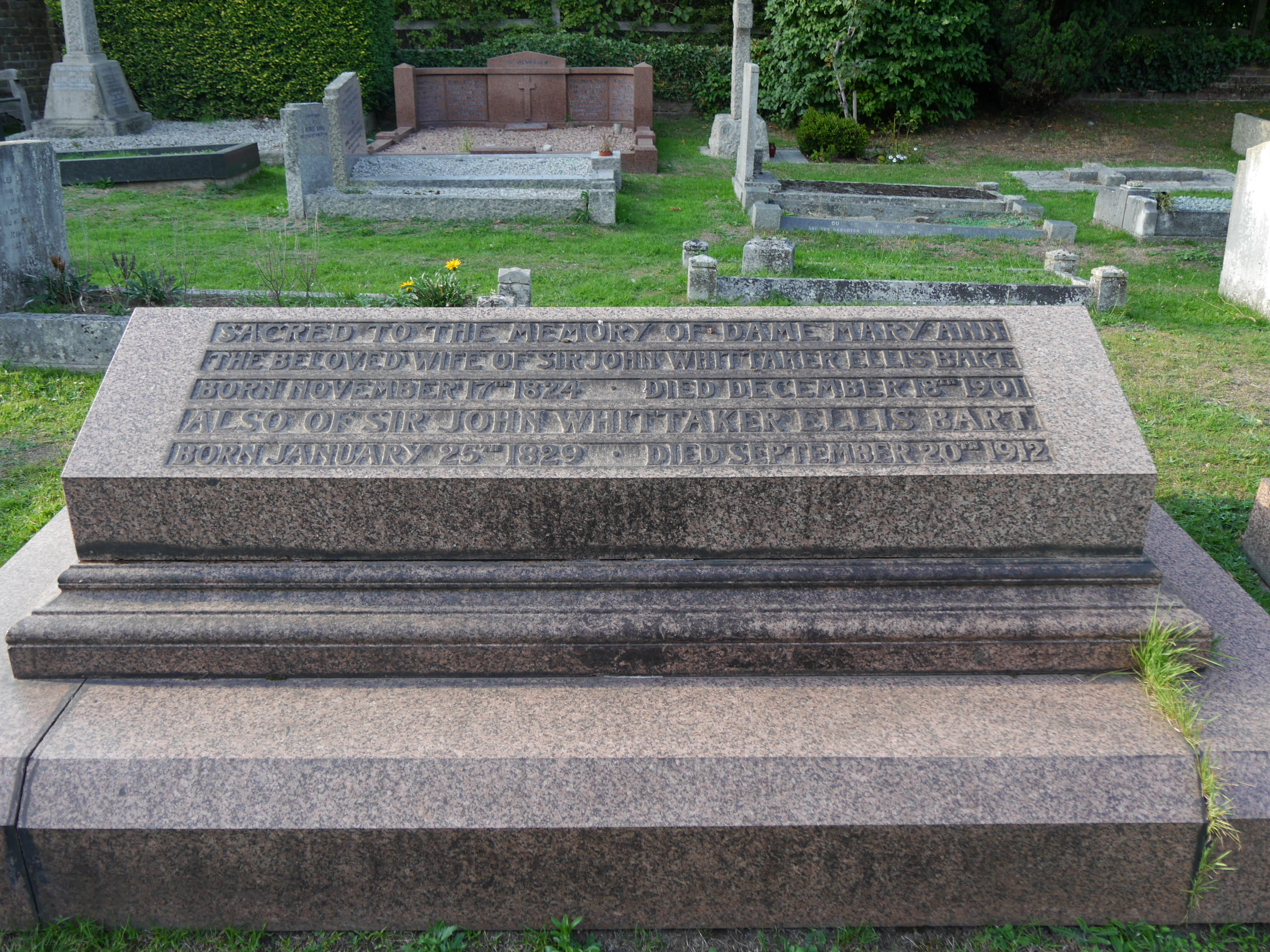
Pyramidal stone slab on massive stone base above his family grave by St Peter's Church, Petersham

Sir John Whittaker Ellis, 1st Baronet JP (25 January 1829 – 20 September 1912) was Lord Mayor of London for 1881–82, in which year he was made a baronet. Two years later he was elected and re-elected Conservative Member of Parliament for eight years, not seeking further re-election. A very prosperous banking executive, estate agent and auctioneer among his legacies was a fire station at Byfleet, Surrey; he sat on the boards of various hospitals and his wife was also engaged in charities.

== Biography ==
Born in 1829, Ellis was the fifth son of Joseph Ellis, owner of the Star and Garter Hotel in Petersham, Richmond, Surrey (now London) from 1830 to 1847.

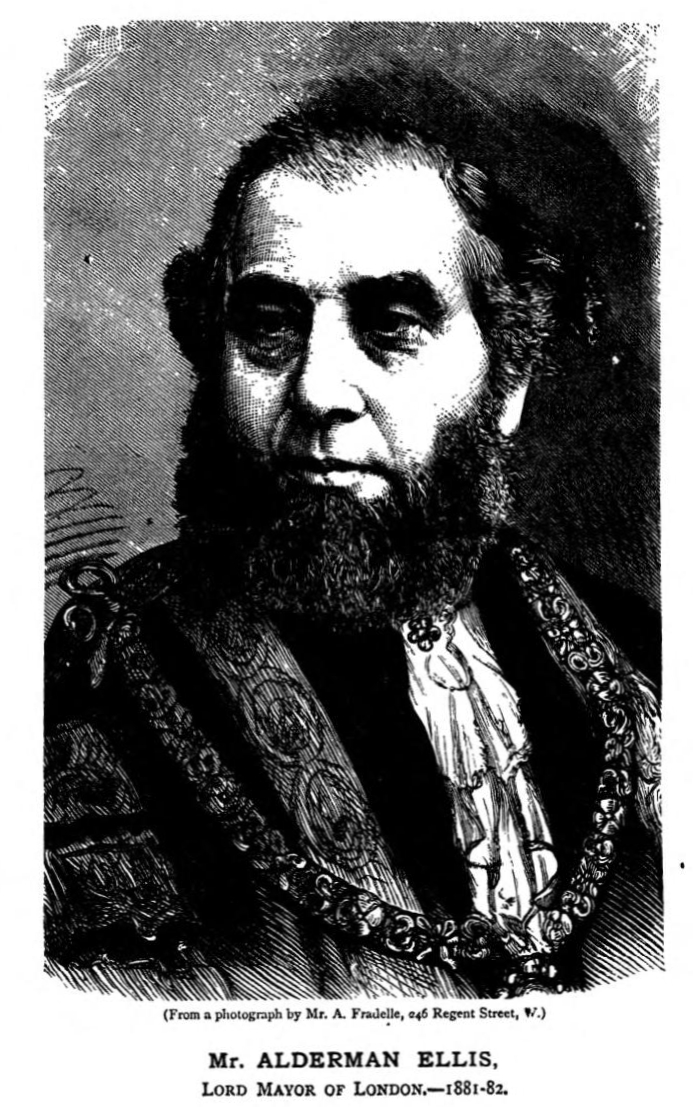

He set up his family in Byfleet, living for many years at Petersham House/Place (built in High Road c. 1859, its surviving front block is 15 High Road, used as Lloyds Bank and a risk consultancy). After a fire there, Ellis organised Byfleet's first fire brigade. He equipped three of his market/domestic gardeners – the Place had attached 17 acres – with three lengths of hose and an obsolete manual pump, put on wheels, kept in a potting shed.

He was a banking executive, auctioneer and estate agent, as well as holding local government posts including alderman of Broad Street Ward, 1872–1909, Sheriff of London and Middlesex, 1874–75, 553rd Lord Mayor of London, 1881–82, and mayor of Richmond, 1890–91. He was also a magistrate (Justice of the Peace); Governor of the Irish Society, 1882–94, governor of various hospitals and High Sheriff of Surrey, 1899–1900.

He was elected for one of the two seats for Mid Surrey at a by-election in 1884. When that area was abolished he was nominated for and won the 1885 general election and that of the next year for the inceptive Kingston upon Thames seat which took in Richmond but retired in 1892. Hansard records 20 contributions of his, making some each year to 1891 inclusive.

On 6 June 1882 he was made a baronet, of Byfleet in the County of Surrey, and of Hertford Street, Mayfair, in the County of Middlesex, a title which became extinct on his death. He later became the Borough of Richmond's first Mayor, and purchased the site for Richmond's first town hall. In 1899 he was appointed High Sheriff of Surrey for the year. He remarried in 1903, to Marian Bailey.

He was appointed Director of Alliance Bank, 1880, then its Chairman, 1883–86; and served years as Chairman of Emanuel Hospital to 1909.

== Death and legacy ==
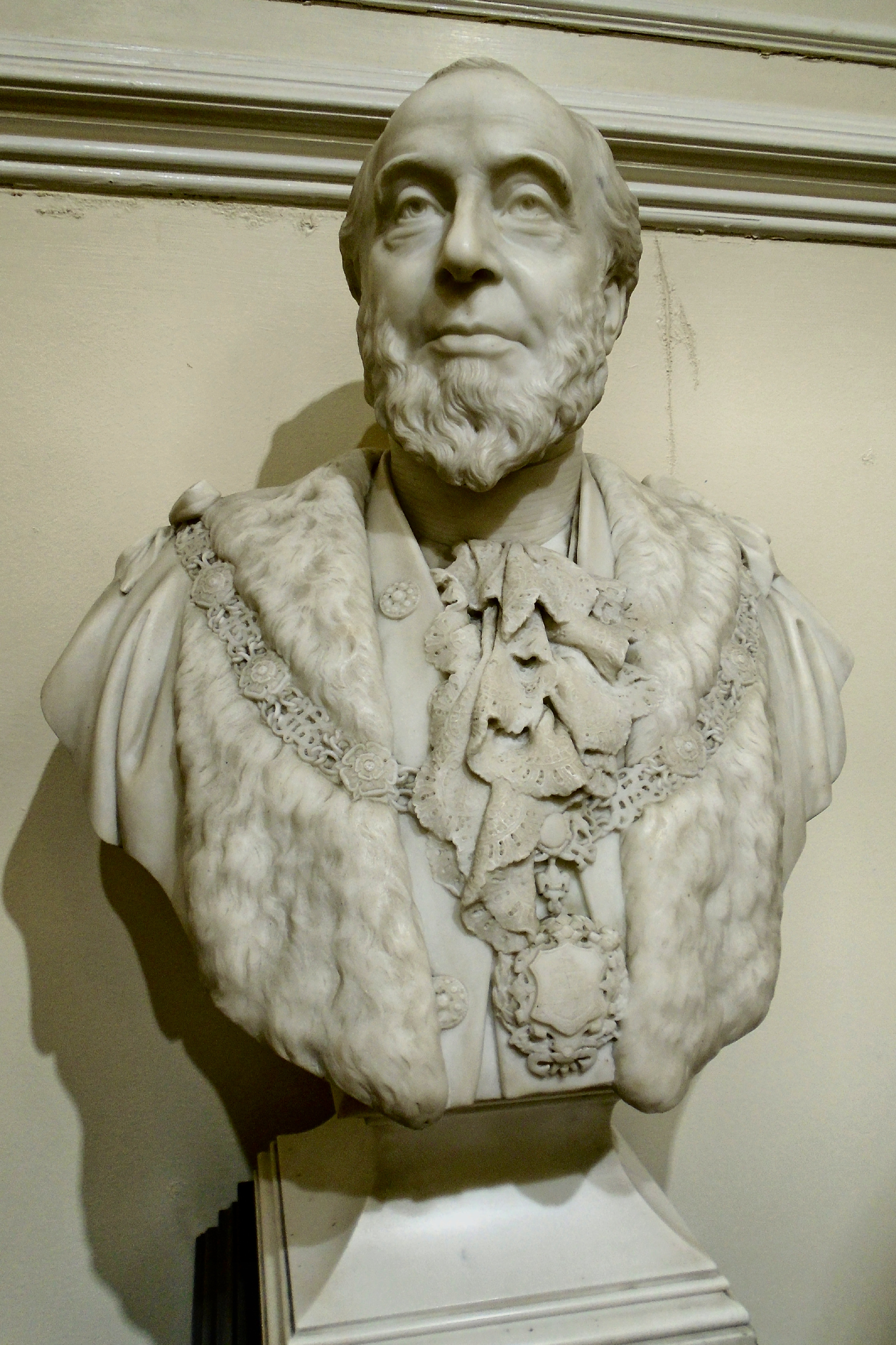
Sculpture of Ellis at Old Town Hall, Richmond

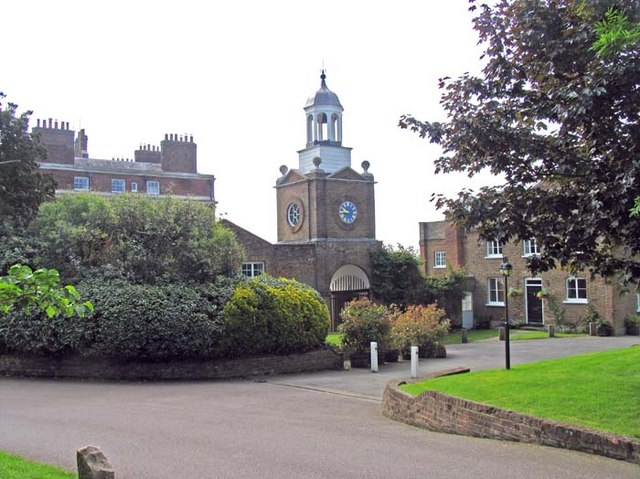
The summary of his probate's extraction states he lived at (the house known as) Wormleybury, Hertfordshire

Ellis died without offspring on 20 September 1912 and is buried in St Peter's churchyard, Petersham. His wife shares a large stone monument above their grave; in the related church he has a plaque in the north chancel.

In 1885, he funded Byfleet Fire Station which would house a volunteer fire brigade. Initially the (civil) parish managed this, renting its building and an engine from Ellis. The building was used until 1963, latterly as part of the Surrey Fire Brigade. The building is little changed and became a Grade II listed building in 2008. 15 High Road, his former front block of the family home, is locally listed, under category "AH", architectural merit.

In 1895 a bust of Ellis was unveiled in Richmond Town Hall by Mary Adelaide, Duchess of Teck; this is still displayed in the staircase alcove.

He is further commemorated by Whittaker Avenue, Richmond. His probate was resworn in 1912, leaving assets of £181,969 (equivalent to about £18,000,000 in 2025)

== Lady Ellis ==
John Whittaker Ellis married, in 1859, Mary Anne Staples, daughter of John Staples.

The first Lady Ellis was a prominent Mayoress both in London and in Richmond, and was identified with many charities in the then greater forms of Surrey (reduced to reflect expansion of London itself in her lifetime and further in 1965). She was president of the Ladies´ Committee of the Royal Cambridge Asylum for 70 military widows (East Molesey), and on the death of Princess Mary Adelaide, Duchess of Teck in 1897 was appointed to succeed her as county president of the Surrey Needlework Guild. She was also one of the presidents of the Soldiers' and Sailors' Families Association and took a prominent part in the establishment of the Society for the Prevention of Cruelty to Children. She died at Buccleuch House, Richmond, Surrey, on 18 December 1901.

== Publications ==
He circulated pamphlets entitled or concerning: "The Land Question, Government of Ireland etc."

== See also ==
- Old Town Hall, Richmond

== Sources ==
- Byfleet Heritage Society archives
- Stevens, Leonard R (2001, 2nd edition reprint by the Byfleet Heritage Society) ‘Byfleet – A Village of England’ (The Byfleet Heritage Society, Byfleet, Surrey).
- Wakeford, Iain (1983) ‘Bygone Woking’ (Phillimore & Co Ltd, Chichester, ISBN 0-85033-506-X).
- Wakeford, Iain (2000) ‘Byfleet – A Heritage Walks Guide’ (AK, HR & DA Wakeford, Old Woking, Surrey)
- Byfleet Heritage Society website

Civic offices
Preceded by William McArthur	Lord Mayor of the City of London; 1881–1882	Succeeded by Henry Knight
Parliament of the United Kingdom
Preceded by Sir Henry Peek, Bt; Sir Trevor Lawrence, Bt	Member of Parliament for Mid Surrey; 1884 – 1885; With: Sir Trevor Lawrence, Bt	Constituency abolished
New constituency	Member of Parliament for Kingston; 1885 – 1892	Succeeded by Sir Richard Temple, Bt
Baronetage of the United Kingdom
New creation	Baronet (of Byfleet and Hertford Street); 1882–1912	Extinct
Preceded by Freake baronets	Ellis baronets of Byfleet and Hertford Street; 6 June 1882	Succeeded by Clarke baronets
