= Dugall Quin =

Traditional song

Dugall Quin (Roud 3928, Child 294) is a traditional English-language folk ballad.

== Synopsis ==
Dugall Quin woos Lisie Meanes, asking her how she likes him in his ragged dress; she answers that she likes him and asks how he likes her in her fine clothing; he likes her and asks her to come with him. Her father asks her not to go. She defies him. Dugall tells her that if he comes with him, he will make her a lady. She goes, and he marries her.

== See also ==
- List of the Child Ballads
- Lizie Lindsay
- The Beggar-Laddie
- Glasgow Peggie
- Bonny Lizie Baillie
