= Geoffrey Potts =

American cognitive psychologist

Geoffrey Franklin Potts is an American cognitive psychologist who a professor at the University of South Florida in Tampa.

Potts earned his Ph.D. in 1994 from the Institute of Cognitive and Decision Sciences at the University of Oregon (Eugene, Oregon). His thesis was titled, "Neural systems of visual target detection: Human event-related potential studies." He completed a post-doctoral fellowship at Harvard Medical School, where he later became an instructor.

He became an assistant professor in the Department of Psychology at Rice University, in Houston, Texas in 1998, and at the University of South Florida in 2006.

== Interests ==
- Neural systems of attention, emotion, and motivation
- Use of ERP (event-related potential) to understand brain function

== See also ==
- List of cognitive scientists
