= Edward Potts =

Edward Potts may refer to:

- Edward Potts (gymnast) (1881–1944), British Olympic gymnast
- Edward Potts (architect) (1839–1909), English architect
- Edward Potts Cheyney (1861–1947), American historian, and historical and economic writer
