= David Potts =

David Potts may refer to:

- David M. Potts (politician) (1906–1976), congressman from New York
- David Potts Jr. (1794–1863), anti-Masonic congressman from Pennsylvania
- David M. Potts (academic) (born 1952), professor of analytical soil mechanics at Imperial College London
- David Potts (businessman) (born 1957), CEO of the British supermarket chain Morrisons
- David Potts (photographer) (1926–2012), Australian photographer
- David Potts (TV personality) (born 1993), English television personality
- David Potts, English rock singer, former member of Monaco (band)
- David Potts, Conservative leader of South Tyneside council
