= Lizie Lindsay =

Traditional song

"Lizie Lindsay" (Roud 94, Child 226), also known as "Lizzie Lindsay" or "Leezie Lindsay", is a traditional scots-language folk song most likely originating in Scotland. It exists in several variants.

== Synopsis ==
A highland Laird courts Lizie Lindsay in Edinburgh, sometime after his mother had warned him not to hide his highland origins. Her family warns him off, but her maid encourages her. She finds the highlands hard, but finally he brings her to his family, where he is a lord, and makes her the lady of a great castle. In some variants, she is told when he is wooing her in Edinburgh that he is a lord, and that is what persuades her to go.

== See also ==
- Dugall Quin
- The Beggar-Laddie
- Glasgow Peggie
- Bonny Lizie Baillie
