= Arthur Potts =

Arthur Potts may refer to:

- Arthur Edward Potts (1890–1983), Canadian general officer active in World War II
- Arthur Potts (footballer) (1888–1981), English footballer
- Arthur Potts (politician) (born c.1957), Canadian politician and Ontario MPP for the Toronto district of Beaches—East York
- Arthur Potts Dawson (born 1971), chef
