= Thomas Potts (writer) =

Thomas Potts (1778–1842) was an English lawyer and writer, known as a compiler of reference works.

== Life ==
He was son of Edward Potts (1721–1819) of Glanton near Alnwick, Northumberland. He was a solicitor, and at one time was connected with Skinners' Hall.

In 1803, Potts was residing in Camden Town. Subsequently, he seems to have lived at Chiswick and other places, and to have had chambers in Serjeants' Inn. He died at Upper Clapton on 8 November 1842.

== Works ==
Potts published:

- A Compendious Law Dictionary, containing both an explanation of the terms and the law itself, intended for the use of country gentlemen, the merchant, and the professional man, 1803, dedicated to Lord Ellenborough; it was reissued in 1814. In 1815, a new edition was enlarged by Thomas Hartwell Horne.
- The British Farmers' Cyclopædia, or Complete Agricultural Dictionary, including every Science or Subject dependent on or connected with improved modern Husbandry, 1806, with 42 engravings, dedicated to the Duke of Bedford. John Donaldson said it was an advance on preceding works.
- A Gazetteer of England and Wales, containing the Statistics, Agriculture, and Mineralogy of the Counties, the History, Antiquities, Curiosities, Trade, &c. of the Cities, Towns, and Boroughs, with Maps, 1810,. An historical introduction of twenty pages with statistics included mitred abbeys.

== Notes ==
Attribution

This article incorporates text from a publication now in the public domain: Lee, Sidney, ed. (1896). "Potts, Thomas (1778-1842)". Dictionary of National Biography. Vol. 46. London: Smith, Elder & Co.
