= Richmond War Memorial, London =

Listed war memorial in Richmond, London

Coordinates: 51.458635°N 0.307045°W

Richmond War Memorial
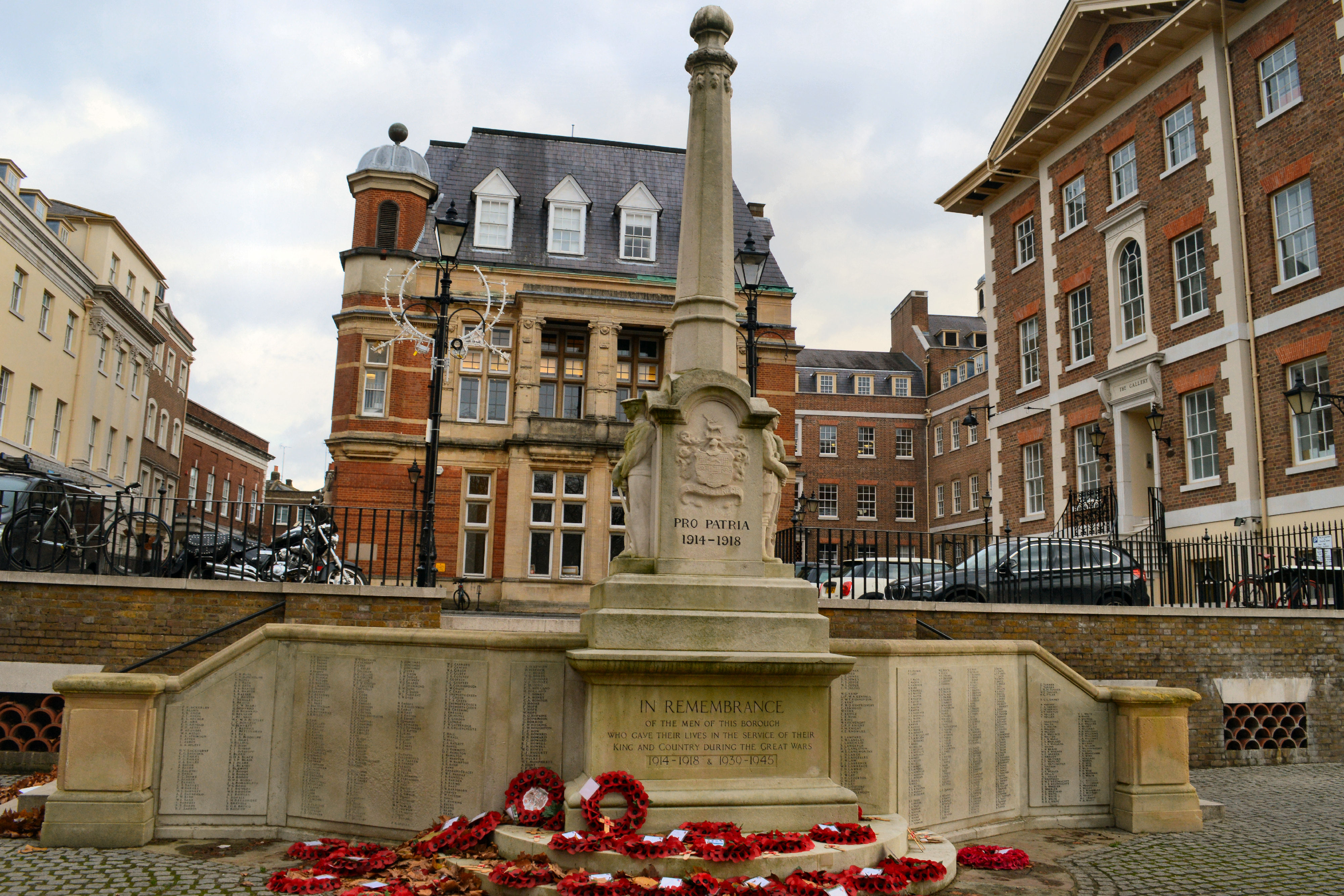

- Location within London Borough of Richmond upon Thames

General information
- Type: war memorial
- Location: Whittaker Avenue, Richmond (in the London Borough of Richmond upon Thames)

Listed Building – Grade II
- Official name: Richmond upon Thames Borough War Memorial
- Designated: 20 July 2017
- Reference no.: 1447856

The Richmond War Memorial is located in front of Whittaker Avenue, between the Old Town Hall and the Riverside in Richmond, London. It marks the deaths of local individuals who died fighting in World War I and World War II. The memorial was designed by the local architects Messrs Goodale and Co of Richmond and was unveiled by Field Marshal Sir William Robertson on 23 November 1921. The Mayor of Richmond and the corporation attended the ceremony.

The memorial has been Grade II listed on the National Heritage List for England since 2017.

It is in the form of a column with an orb on top, standing on a double plinth. On the north side is the statue of a sailor, on the south side the statue of a soldier, and on the east and west sides are the coat of arms of the former Municipal Borough of Richmond, accompanied by this quotation:

PRO PATRIA
1914–1918

On the west side there is a further inscription:

IN REMEMBRANCE
OF THE MEN OF THIS BOROUGH
WHO GAVE THEIR LIVES IN THE SERVICE OF THEIR KING AND COUNTRY
DURING THE GREAT WARS
1914–1918 AND 1939–1945

The names of the war dead are engraved into walls that jut out from the memorial. The walls of names were added to the memorial after a newspaper campaign in 1989. The head of the sailor was cut off by vandals in 2003.
