= Andrew Potts =

Andrew Potts may refer to:

- Andrew-Lee Potts (born 1979), British actor
- Andrew R. Potts (1853–1932), American politician
- Andy Potts (born 1976), American athlete
