= Frederick Potts =

Frederick Potts may refer to:

- Frederic A. Potts (1836–1888), American coal merchant and politician
- Fred Potts (1892–1943), English recipient of the Victoria Cross
- Fred Potts (footballer) (1893–?), English footballer

== See also ==
- Freddie Potts (born 2003), English footballer
