= Queensland Law Society =

- Type: Bar association
- Region served: Queensland
- Website: www.qls.com.au

The Queensland Law Society (QLS) is the peak representative body for the legal profession in Queensland, providing leadership, guidance and support for more than 12,000 members, across all categories.

The Society has statutory responsibilities under the Legal Profession Act 2007. It engages with the government, the public, and the legal community on issues related to the legal profession in Queensland.

The Queensland Law Society has a long history of serving the legal profession, and the people of Queensland.

The Society, in its first incarnation, was formed on 7 August 1873 at a meeting of 15 influential solicitors at the Brisbane Supreme Court. These solicitors recognised the need for a governing body, and the initial objectives of the Society were stated to be:

- protection of the public by suppressing dishonourable practice among solicitors
- to advise the legislature on amendments to the law
- to facilitate the amicable settlement of professional differences so that solicitors could present a dignified image to the public.

In 1883, the Queensland Law Association was formed and continued until 1927 in which the Society was incorporated and became the statutory body known today.
