= Steve Potts =

Steve Potts may refer to:

- Steve Potts (jazz musician) (born 1943), American jazz saxophonist
- Steve Potts (footballer) (born 1967), American-born English football coach and former professional footballer
- Steve Potts (drummer), drummer with Booker T. & the M.G.'s
- Stephen Potts, British children's author
- Stephen Potts, (born 1930), American tennis player active from 1949 to 1968.
- Stephen D. Potts, director of the United States Office of Government Ethics, 1990−2000
