= Jason Potts =

Jason Potts may refer to:

- Jason Potts (economist)
- Jason Potts (politician)
