= POTS =

POTS or Pots may refer to:

- Plain old telephone service, basic wireline telecommunication connection
- Postural orthostatic tachycardia syndrome, a medical condition
- Cooking pots, cookware
- Pottery, the ceramic ware made by potters
- Poverty of the stimulus, an argument in favor of innate grammar
- The Pots (Χύτροι, Khýtroi), the last day of the Anthesteria festival in ancient Athens

== See also ==
- POTS codec, a digital audio device
- DSL filter, also known as a POTS filter
- Pot (disambiguation)
