= John Potts (cricketer) =

English cricketer

John Potts (born 4 July 1960) was an English cricketer. He was a right-handed batsman and right-arm medium-fast bowler who played for Cheshire. He was born in Stoke-on-Trent, Staffordshire.

Potts, who played for one season with Leicestershire Under 25s and Second XI, plus 2 First XI matches v The Minor Counties, and The Combined Services, having previously played for Staffordshire County Cricket Club. He made his debut List A appearance in the 1992 NatWest Trophy, against Gloucestershire County Cricket Club. From the lower order, he scored 14 with the bat, and took figures of 1–34 with the ball.

He played in the following year's competition, against Nottinghamshire County Cricket Club, taking 2 wickets and scoring 8 runs.

JP Snr has a cricket loving son Jordan, playing for Cheadle Hulme CC in the Cheshire Cricket leagues.
