= Frank Potts =

Frank Potts may refer to:

- Frank Potts (coach) (1903–1990), American pole vaulter and coach
- Frank Potts (winemaker)
- Frank L. Potts, Canadian politician
