= Glasgow Peggie =

Traditional song

"Glasgow Peggie" or "Glasgow Peggy" (Child 228, Roud 95) is a traditional English-language folk song, existing in several variants.

== Synopsis ==
A Highlander comes to steal Peggie. In most variants, her father (and in some, her mother), declare that he might steal their animals, but not their daughter. He carries her off anyway. A few variants end there, but some also include either her parents or a local earl regretting that he got away with it. Peggie laments their harsh conditions. The Highlander assures her, or shows her, that he has plenty of property, and is, indeed, a lord (often the lord of Skye), and makes her his lady. Some variants explicitly include that he is richer than her parents.

== See also ==
- Bonny Lizie Baillie
- Lizie Lindsay
- Dugall Quin
- The Beggar-Laddie
