= The Beggar-Laddie =

Traditional song

The Beggar-Laddie is a traditional English ballad that exists in several variants. It was collected by Francis James Child as Child ballad 280 (Roud 119).

== Synopsis ==
A man tells a woman that he is a beggar, making his living from spindles or similar items. She loves him and follows him. After a time, she finds it very hard, but then he takes her on to his father's hall, or sometimes his brother's. His brothers express envy of his bride, and she gains a husband of high birth.

== First editions ==
The first known record, probably, dates from 1805; it was included in the Old Lady's Collection. Other early versions were collected in the D. Kinloch's MS and C. Motherwell's MS (both written before 1850). The first publication of the song could be found in Christie's Traditional Ballad Airs (1876, I).

== See also ==
- The Jolly Beggar
- Dugall Quin
- Lizie Lindsay
- Glasgow Peggie
- Bonny Lizie Baillie
