= Joe Potts (footballer) =

English footballer (1889–1980)

Personal information
- Full name: Joseph Potts
- Date of birth: 25 February 1889
- Place of birth: Newcastle upon Tyne, England
- Date of death: 1980 (aged 90–91)
- Height: 5 ft 10 1/2 in (1.79 m)
- Position: Full-back

Senior career*
Years	Team	Apps	(Gls)
1909–1911	New York FC (Newcastle)		
1911–1912	Ashington		
1912–1914	Hull City	5	(0)
1920–1921	Portsmouth	5	(0)
1921–1923	Leeds United	10	(0)
1923–1925	Chesterfield	53	(0)
1925–1927	Bradford Park Avenue	38	(0)
Total		111	(0)
- * Club domestic league appearances and goals

Joseph Potts (25 February 1889 – 1980) was an English footballer who played in the Football League for Bradford Park Avenue, Chesterfield, Leeds United and Portsmouth.
