= Pot =

Pot may refer to:

== Containers ==
- Flowerpot, a container in which plants are cultivated
- Pottery, ceramic containers made from clay
- Cooking pot, a type of cookware
- Pot, a 285 ml (10.0 imp fl oz; 9.6 US fl oz) beer glass

== Places ==
- Ken Jones Aerodrome (IATA airport code POT)
- Palestinian Occupied Territories, the West Bank
- Pontefract Tanshelf railway station (National Rail station code POT), England
- Po Tat station (MTR station code POT), Hong Kong
- Patterson Office Tower, a high-rise office building located at the University of Kentucky, US

== People ==
- Cor Pot (born 1951), Dutch football manager and player
- Philippe Pot (1428–1493), Burgundian nobleman, military leader, and diplomat
- Pol Pot (1925–1998), leader of the communist Khmer Rouge in Kampuchea or Cambodia

== Art, entertainment and media ==
- Pot (novel), a 1981 novel by Nejc Zaplotnik
- Pot (poker), the amount to be won in gambling
- P.O.T., former Filipino rock band
- "The Pot", a 2006 song by Tool

== Science and technology ==
- Abdominal obesity or pot belly, informally known as a "pot"
- Cannabis (drug) or pot
- Peaks over threshold, a method in extreme value theory in maths
- Postural orthostatic tachycardia syndrome (POTS), a heart condition
- Power of two, a set of numbers used in many electronics and computing contexts
- × Potinara (abbreviation: Pot.), an orchid genus

=== Computing and electronics ===
- .pot, file extension for template files of the gettext GNU localization software
- .pot, file extension for Microsoft PowerPoint template files
- Plain old telephone service, voice-grade telephone service
- Pot, a ceramic insulator supporting an electric conductor rail to provide electric traction power to trains
- Potentiometer, a variable resistor, informally known as a "pot" or "trim pot"

== Other uses ==
- PotashCorp (stock symbol: POT)
- Fishing pot, a trap used for fishing
- POT, legal entity of Yoshihiro Togashi and copyright holder for the Hunter × Hunter manga series

== See also ==
- POTS (disambiguation)
