= Potts of Leeds =

British clock manufacturer

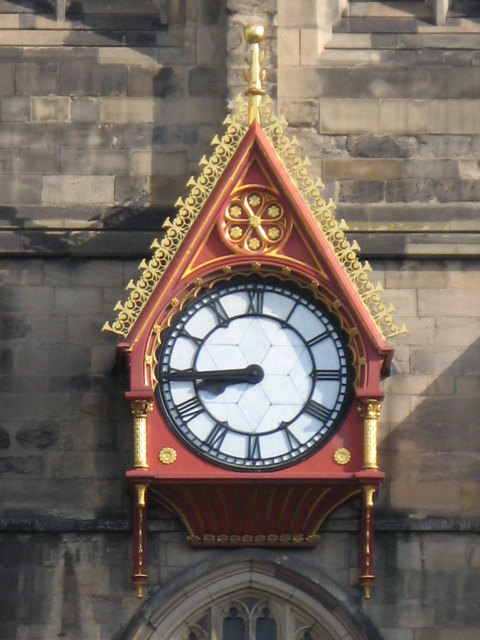
Characteristic hands and face of a Potts clock (Newcastle Cathedral)

Potts of Leeds was a major British manufacturer of public clocks, based in Leeds, Yorkshire, England.

== History ==
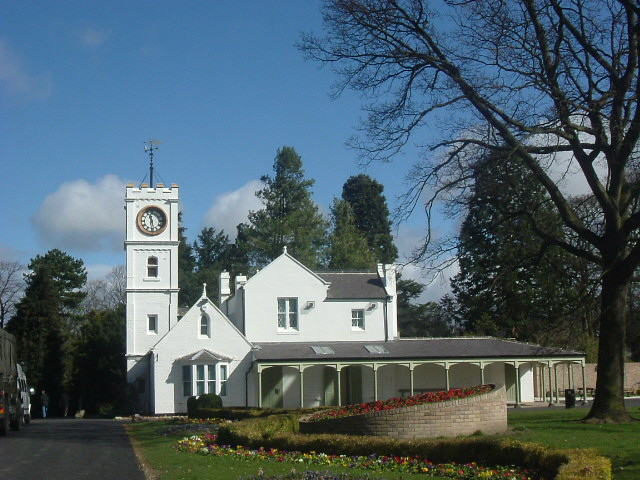
William Potts Memorial Clock erected by his sons in 1901 in Darlington (his birthplace)

William Potts was born in December 1809 and was apprenticed to Samuel Thompson, a Darlington clockmaker. In 1833, at the age of 24, William moved to Pudsey near Leeds, to set up his own business. Initially the business was primarily concerned with domestic timepieces, however this gradually expanded into the manufacture and repair of public clocks.

In 1862 the business moved to Guildford Street, Leeds, and later, a workshop for public clocks opened nearby in Cookridge Street. This heralded the most productive and profitable years of the business with large numbers of public clocks being installed both home and abroad for cathedrals, churches, town halls, schools, engineering works and railways. Queen Victoria granted the company a Royal Warrant in 1897. In 1875 they installed a model of the time ball at Greenwich in their shop window and received the time signal by electric telegraph.

The business was renamed William Potts & Sons Limited as a result of three of William’s sons joining the company, however, after the First World War, two sons started their own clockmaking business, Tom Potts left in 1928 and Charles Potts left in 1930. William Potts & Sons Limited joined the Smith of Derby Group in 1935, but, as a well-recognised name, Potts retained its identity and the Leeds base. Today the Potts name is still recognised and active in the north of Britain.

It is claimed that there are more than 1600 Potts clocks in existence around England.

== Examples ==
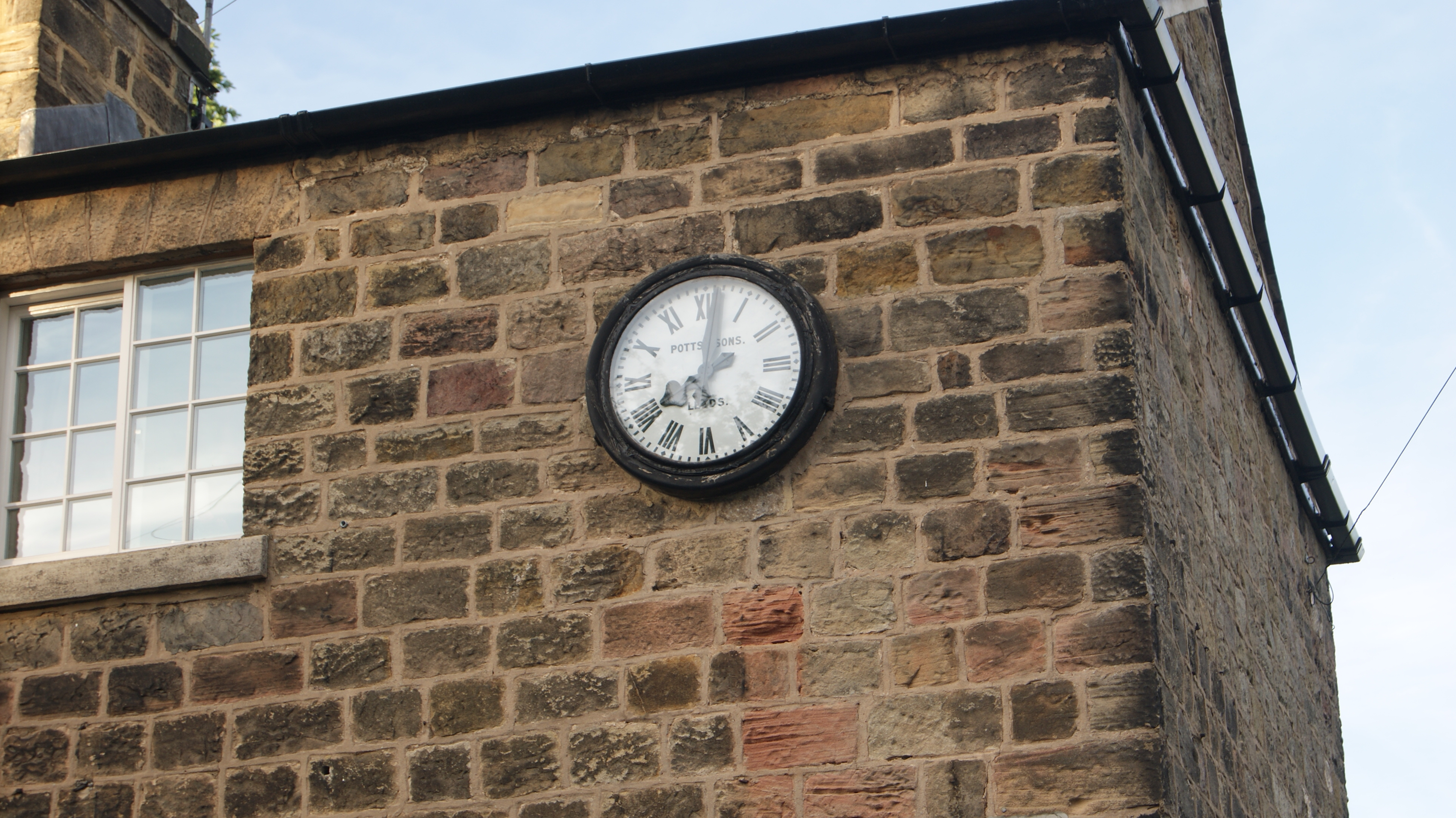
Potts clock in East Keswick

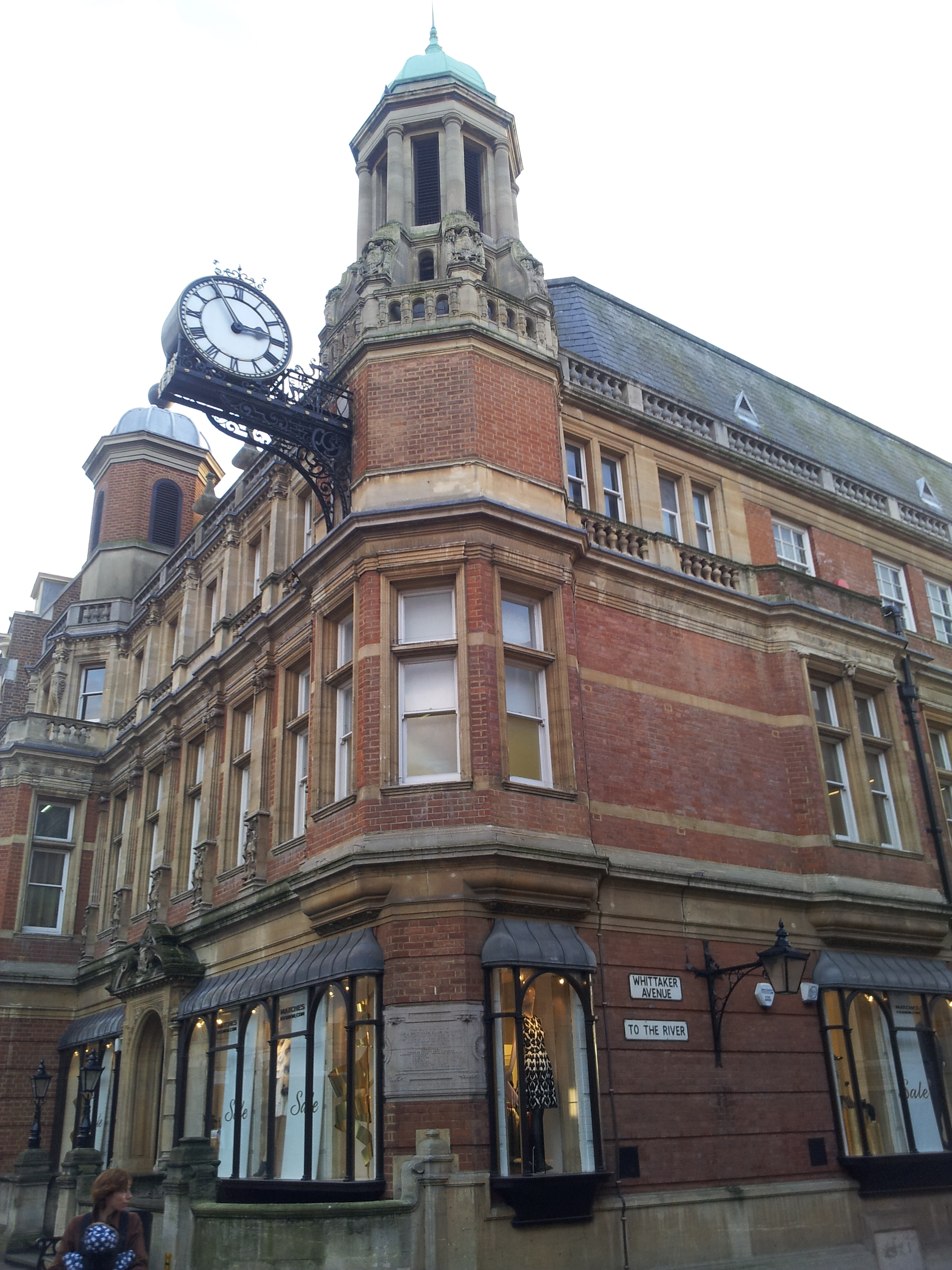
A Potts clock juts out from the main frontage of the Old Town Hall, Richmond, now in London, which was opened in 1893.

Potts' clocks were installed in public buildings, churches, railway stations, workplaces and other premises. According to Potts' register, 1,568 new clocks were installed and 54 of them subsequently transferred to new locations by the company. The total included, 363 quarter-chiming clocks and 510 hour-striking clocks. Many were installed at locations in Yorkshire, and Leeds had the most, including examples on Leeds Town Hall and Leeds Corn Exchange. The clock on the Pierhead Building at Cardiff Docks was installed in 1897, but was removed and sold in 1973. The mechanism was taken to Alabama, USA and returned to Cardiff in 2005. It was planned to install the Potts clock as a piece of contemporary art, encased in glass, in Cardiff city centre.

Other clocks were installed further afield, Lerwick Town Hall's clock was installed in 1887, and one on the Roman Catholic Church Hall in Melbourne, Australia dates from 1930. Five clocks were exported to India but their locations are not known, two went to Russia and there is an example on the post office in Lyttelton, New Zealand. Potts provided the mechanism for a floral clock at Belle Vue Zoological Gardens in 1936.

== Sources ==
- Potts, Michael (2006). Potts of Leeds – Five Generations of Clockmakers. Mayfield Books. ISBN 0-9523270-8-2.
