= Tom Potts =

Traditional song

Song
- Genre: folk

Tom Potts (Roud 66, Child 109) is a traditional English-language folk ballad.

== Synopsis ==
The heroine rejects a rich suitor, Lord Fenix/Phenix, for her poor true love, Tom Potts. Her angry father makes arrangements for the wedding regardless. She sends word to Tom. He sends back word that he will be there and goes to his lord, asking for assistance. The lord is generous with him. Tom interrupts the wedding procession to challenge the groom. He wins. Her father agrees to their marriage and makes Tom his heir.

== Motifs ==
The unequal match is a very common motif in ballads and romances, such as Richie Story and King Cophetua.
