= List of people from the London Borough of Richmond upon Thames =

Location of the London Borough of Richmond upon Thames within Greater London

The London Borough of Richmond upon Thames was created in 1965 when, under the London Government Act 1963, the Municipal Borough of Richmond (Surrey), the Municipal Borough of Barnes (also in Surrey) and the Municipal Borough of Twickenham (in Middlesex) were merged to become a new London borough within Greater London.

This is a categorised list of notable people who were born or have lived within the borders of the modern borough (which covers Barnes, East Sheen, Ham, Hampton, Kew, Hampton Hill, Hampton Wick, Mortlake, Petersham, Richmond, St Margarets, Teddington, Twickenham and Whitton). Only people who are sufficiently notable to have individual entries on Wikipedia have been included in the list and, in each instance, their birth or residence has been verified by citations. The list is divided into two main categories – living people and historical figures.

== People in Barnes ==
Barnes, in a bend of the River Thames, is in the extreme north-east of the borough (and as such is the closest part of the borough to central London). Its built environment includes a high proportion of 18th- and 19th-century buildings in the streets near Barnes Pond. Together these make up the Barnes Village conservation area where, along with its west riverside, most of the mid-19th century properties are concentrated. Its past residents include the composer Gustav Holst (1874–1934) and Ninette de Valois (1898–2001), founder of the Royal Ballet. They each lived in houses on The Terrace, Barnes which are marked by blue plaques.

== People in East Sheen ==
East Sheen was a hamlet in the parish of Mortlake. It became a fashionable suburb in the 19th century. Its notable residents include Sir Tim Berners-Lee (born 1955), computer scientist and inventor of the World Wide Web, who grew up there and attended Sheen Mount Primary School. A mosaic by Sue Edkins was placed at Sheen Lane Centre in June 2013 to commemorate his association with East Sheen.

== People in Ham ==
Ham's main feature is Ham Common which has a cricket pitch, a pond and woodland. A straight tree-lined path leads from Ham Common to Ham House, the most significant house in Ham. Several notable period houses in Ham cluster around the Common including the Cassel Hospital, Langham House and Ormeley Lodge which, until her death in 2025, was owned by Lady Annabel Goldsmith. Victorian buildings include Latchmere House. In contrast, Langham House Close, to the west of Ham Common, completed in 1958, is an early example of brutalist architecture and just to the north of Ham Parade is Parkleys. Started in 1954 and completed in 1956, Parkleys was the first large-scale residential development by the pioneering SPAN Developments Ltd of Eric Lyons and Geoffrey Townsend.

Past residents include John Henry Newman, later Saint John Henry Cardinal Newman (1801–1890), who spent some of his early years at Grey Court, Ham Street, Ham. The site is marked by a blue plaque.

== People in Hampton ==
Hampton, on the north bank of the Thames, includes Hampton Court Palace. The mathematician and computer scientist Alan Turing (1912–1954) lived at Ivy House – which now has a blue plaque – in Hampton High Street between 1945 and 1947 while working at the National Physical Laboratory in Teddington.

== People in Kew ==
Kew is the location of the Royal Botanic Gardens ("Kew Gardens"), now a World Heritage Site, which includes Kew Palace. Successive Tudor, Stuart and Georgian monarchs maintained links with Kew. During the French Revolution, many refugees established themselves there and it was the home of several artists in the 18th and 19th centuries.

Most of Kew developed in the late 19th century, following the arrival of what is now the London Underground's District line. Further development took place in the 1920s and 1930s when new houses were built on the market gardens of North Sheen, and in the first decade of the 21st century when considerably more river-fronting flats and houses were constructed next to the River Thames on land formerly owned by Thames Water.

== People in Mortlake ==
Mortlake is on the south bank of the Thames between Kew and Barnes. Historically it was part of Surrey and until 1965 was in the Municipal Borough of Barnes. For many centuries it had village status and extended far to the south, to include East Sheen and part of what is now Richmond Park. Its Stuart and Georgian history was economically one of malting, brewing, farming, water transport and tapestry.

Mortlake's most famous former resident is John Dee (1527–1608/09), mathematician, astronomer, astrologer, alchemist and adviser to Queen Elizabeth I. He lived at Mortlake from 1565 to 1595 except for the six years between 1583 and 1589 when he was travelling in Europe. His house no longer exists but it became the Mortlake Tapestry Works and at the end of the 18th century was a girls' school.

== People in Petersham ==
Petersham is a village on the east of the bend in the Thames south of Richmond, which it shares with neighbouring Ham. It provides the foreground of the scenic view from Richmond Hill across Petersham Meadows, with Ham House further along the river.

Past residents include George Vancouver (1757–1798), Captain in the Royal Navy and one of Britain's greatest explorers and navigators, after whom the city of Vancouver in British Columbia, Canada is named. He retired to Petersham, where he wrote A Voyage of Discovery to the North Pacific Ocean, and Round the World while living in what is now called Glen Cottage in River Lane. He died in 1798 and is buried in the churchyard of Petersham Parish Church. The Portland stone monument over his grave, renovated in the 1960s, is now Grade II listed in view of its historical associations.

== People in St Margarets ==
St Margarets takes its name from the former St Margaret's House, which was completed in 1827 although an earlier house of the same name stood on the site. It was the country house of Archibald Kennedy, 1st Marquess of Ailsa and later belonged to Francis Needham, 2nd Earl of Kilmorey, who are commemorated in local street names, including Kilmorey Gardens and Ailsa Road.

Past residents include J. M. W. Turner (1775–1851), the English Romantic painter, printmaker and watercolourist. He commissioned the building of a country retreat on Sandycoombe Road which is now known as Turner's House and is open to the public.

== People in Teddington ==
Teddington is on the north bank of the Thames, just after the start of a long meander, between Hampton Wick and Strawberry Hill. Notable past residents include Sir Noël Coward (1899–1973), actor, playwright and songwriter, who was born at 131 Waldegrave Road, Teddington. Teddington Library, which is nearby, has a bust of Coward, sculpted by Avril Vellacot.

== People in Twickenham ==
Twickenham, the administrative centre of the London Borough of Richmond upon Thames, has an extensive town centre and is the home of rugby union, with hundreds of thousands of spectators visiting Twickenham Stadium, the world's largest rugby stadium, each year. The historic riverside area includes 18th-century buildings and pleasure grounds, many of which survive intact. This area has three grand period mansions with public access: York House, Marble Hill House and Strawberry Hill House. (Another has been lost, that belonging to 18th-century poet Alexander Pope.) Among these is the neo-Gothic prototype home of Horace Walpole which has given its name to a whole district, Strawberry Hill, and is linked with Britain's oldest Roman Catholic university, St Mary's University, Twickenham.

The 1818 Enclosure Award led to the development of land to the west of the town centre largely between the present-day Staines and Hampton Roads, where new roads – Workhouse Road, Middle Road, 3rd, 2nd and 1st Common Roads (now First to Fifth Cross Roads respectively) – were laid out. During the 18th and 19th centuries, a number of fine houses were built and Twickenham became a popular place of residence for people of "fashion and distinction". Further development was stimulated by the opening of Twickenham railway station in 1848.

== People in Whitton ==
With the royal court often staying in Richmond and Hampton Court in the 18th century, Twickenham and nearby Whitton became very fashionable places in which to live and this has left the area with a unique cultural heritage. The only remaining country house left in Whitton is the mid-19th century Kneller Hall. It replaced a house built in 1709 by portrait painter Sir Godfrey Kneller (1646–1723). It was the Royal Military School of Music for more than 150 years, until 2021, when it was announced that the hall would become the Upper School for Radnor House School, Twickenham, which had been housed in Pope's villa.

== People in Richmond town and Richmond Park ==
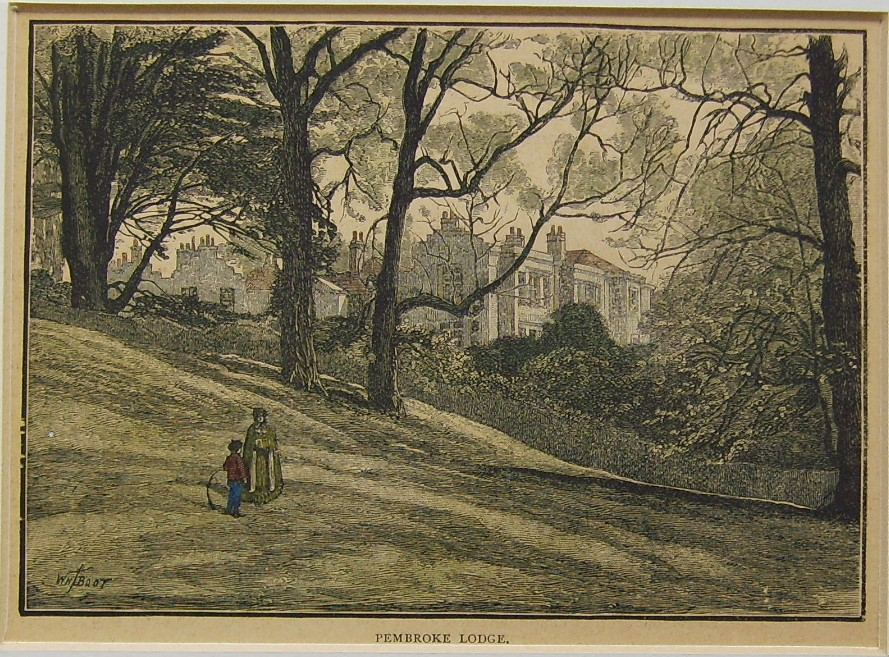
Pembroke Lodge in the 1880s, when it was the home of Lord Russell, British prime minister. His grandson Bertrand Russell grew up there.

Richmond was founded following King Henry VII's building in the 16th century of Richmond Palace (so-named in 1501), from which the town derives its name. (The palace itself commemorates King Henry's earldom of Richmond, North Yorkshire, the original Richmond.) The town and palace became particularly associated with Queen Elizabeth I (r. 1558–1603), who spent her last days there. During the 18th century, Richmond Bridge connected the two banks of the Thames, and many Georgian terraces were built, particularly around Richmond Green and on Richmond Hill. Those that have survived remain well-preserved and many have been designated listed buildings on account of their architectural or historic significance. The opening of Richmond railway station in 1846 was a significant event in the absorption of the town into a rapidly expanding London.

In 1890 the town of Richmond, formerly part of the ancient parish of Kingston upon Thames in the county of Surrey, became a municipal borough, which later extended to include Kew, Ham, Petersham and part of Mortlake (North Sheen). The municipal borough was abolished in 1965, when local-government reorganisation transferred Richmond from Surrey to Greater London.

Richmond Park, the largest of London's Royal Parks, was created by Charles I in the 17th century as a deer park. It includes many buildings of architectural or historic interest. White Lodge was formerly a royal residence and is now home to the Royal Ballet School. Pembroke Lodge was the home of 19th-century British Prime Minister Lord John Russell and his grandson, the philosopher Bertrand Russell.

=== Living people ===
==== Actors, broadcasters, entertainers and musicians ====
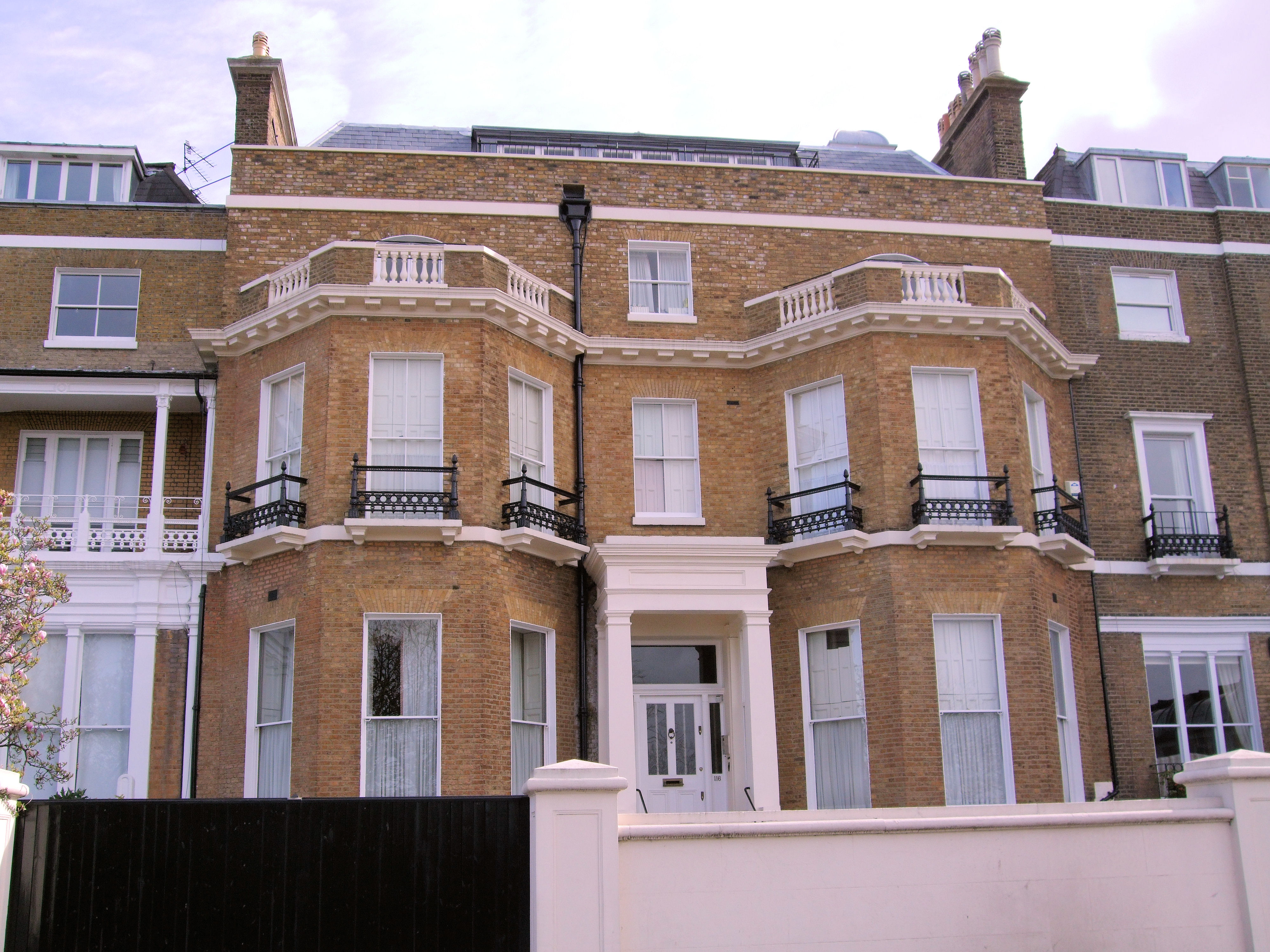
Downe House on Richmond Hill, formerly the home of Mick Jagger

Name	Description	Local connection	Ref
Anita Anand	Writer and broadcaster, presenter of BBC Radio 4's Any Answers?	She lives in Richmond.	
Anastacia	Singer-songwriter	She used to live on Richmond Hill.	
Richard Ashcroft	The Verve singer and songwriter	He lives in Richmond.	
Rick Astley	Singer, songwriter and podcaster	He lived for several years in Richmond.	
Sir David Attenborough	Natural historian, broadcaster and author	He has a house in Richmond.	
Michael Attenborough	Theatre director	He lived on Richmond Green with his parents Richard Attenborough and Sheila Sim.	
Helen Baxendale	Actress	She lives in Richmond.	
Brian Blessed	Actor, writer and television presenter	He owned Clarence House, 2 The Vineyard in Richmond from 1967 to 1976.	
Anna Chancellor	Actress	She was born in Richmond.	
Richard E. Grant	Actor	He lives in Richmond.	
Jerry Hall	Model and actress	She has lived in Richmond.	
John Hannah and Joanna Roth	Actors	They live in Richmond.	
Tom Hardy	Actor	He bought a home in Richmond in 2013.	
Amanda Holden	Actress, media personality and singer	She has lived in Richmond.	
Jane Horrocks	Actress and voice artist	She lives in Richmond.	
Sir Mick Jagger	Rock musician, The Rolling Stones	He lived at Downe House, Richmond Hill when he was married to Jerry Hall.	
Angelina Jolie and Brad Pitt	Actors	They bought a family home in Richmond in 2012.	
Mollie King	Singer in girl group The Saturdays	She is from Richmond.	
Sisters Juliet Mills and Hayley Mills	Actresses	They lived at The Wick on Richmond Hill with their parents John Mills and Mary Hayley Bell.	
Nick Mohammed	Actor, comedian and writer	He has lived in Richmond.	
Dougie Poynter	Musician and bassist in McFly	He bought a house in Richmond in 2014.	
Pete Townshend	Guitarist for The Who	He lived at The Wick on Richmond Hill until 2021.	
Bruce Welch	Musician with The Shadows	He lives in Richmond.	
Ronnie Wood	Rock musician, guitarist; a member of the Rolling Stones since 1975	He lived at The Wick on Richmond Hill.	

==== Businesspeople ====
Name	Description	Local connection	Ref
Peter Hendy, Baron Hendy of Richmond Hill	Minister of State for Rail and previously chairman of Network Rail and commissioner of Transport for London	He lives in Richmond.	

==== Royals ====
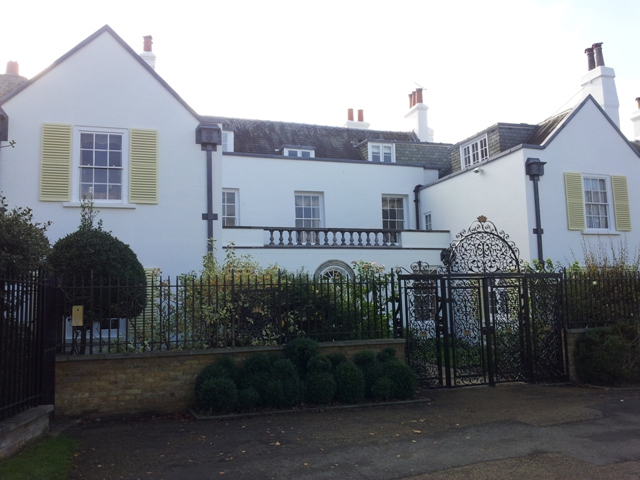
Thatched House Lodge in Richmond Park, home of Princess Alexandra

Name	Description	Local connection	Ref
Princess Alexandra, The Honourable Lady Ogilvy	Granddaughter of George V and a first cousin of Queen Elizabeth II	She lives at Thatched House Lodge in Richmond Park.	
James Ogilvy	The elder child of Princess Alexandra and her husband Angus Ogilvy. Landscape designer, and the founder and editor of the magazine Luxury Briefing	He was born at Thatched House Lodge.	
Marina Ogilvy	The younger child and only daughter of Princess Alexandra and Angus Ogilvy	She was born at Thatched House Lodge.	

==== Sportsmen and sportswomen ====
Name	Description	Local connection	Ref
Lawrence Dallaglio	Rugby union player; former captain of the England national rugby union team	He lives in Richmond.	

==== Writers and artists ====
Name	Description	Local connection	Ref
Jez Alborough	Writer and illustrator of children's picture books	He lives in Richmond.	
Fraser Nelson	Political journalist and columnist for The Times, he was editor of The Spectator magazine from 2009 to 2024	He lives in Richmond.	
Simon Singh	Popular science author, theoretical and particle physicist	He lives in Richmond.	
Guy Spier	Investor and author of The Education of a Value Investor, a best-selling book on investing	He has a home in Richmond.	
Matthew Syed	Columnist for The Times, author, broadcaster and former table tennis player	He has lived in Richmond since the 1990s.	

=== Historical figures ===
==== Actors, broadcasters, entertainers and musicians ====
Name	Dates	Description	Local connection	Ref
Malcolm Arnold	1921–2006	Composer	He lived at Denbigh Gardens and at Sheen Road, Richmond.	
Richard Attenborough, Lord Attenborough	1923–2014	Actor and film director, and his wife Sheila Sim (1922–2016), actress	They lived from 1949 to 2012 on Richmond Green.	
Johann Christian Bach	1735–1782	Composer; the youngest son of Johann Sebastian Bach	He had a house in Richmond in the 1770s, but it is not known where. He was music master to the royal household at Kew.	
Geoffrey Barkas	1896–1979	Filmmaker	He was awarded the Military Cross in 1916, Between the world wars he became a filmmaker and led the British Middle East Command Camouflage Directorate in the Second World War.	
Syd Barrett	1946–2006	Former lead singer with Pink Floyd	He shared a flat in Richmond with Rick Wright.	
Mary Hayley Bell	1911–2005	Actress, writer and dramatist, and her husband, John Mills (1908–2005), actor	They lived at The Wick on Richmond Hill.	
Ronald Colman	1891–1958	Actor	He was born in Richmond.	
Gustav Holst	1874–1934	Composer, best known for his orchestral suite The Planets	He lived at 31 Grena Road, Richmond between 1903 and 1908.	
Imogen Holst	1907–1984	Composer, arranger, conductor, teacher, musicologist and festival administrator	She was born at 31 Grena Road, Richmond and lived there until the family moved to Barnes in 1908.	
Louis Honig	1849–1906	Composer and musician	He lived in Richmond from about 1883 at Waterford Lodge, and is recorded in the 1891 Census as living at 70 Church Road, Richmond.	
Celia Johnson	1908–1982	Actress	She was born at 46 Richmond Hill, Richmond, where there is now a blue plaque.	
Edmund Kean	1787–1833	Shakespearean stage actor	He had a house next door to the King's Theatre in Richmond where he was actor-manager, and died there.	
Rudolph Nureyev	1938–1993	Ballet dancer and choreographer	He owned a house in Richmond until the 1980s.	
Keith Relf	1943–1976	Musician, best known as the lead vocalist and harmonica player for the Yardbirds	He was born in Richmond and is buried at Richmond Cemetery.	
Peter Sallis	1921–2017	Actor, who played Norman Clegg in the BBC comedy Last of the Summer Wine	He was born in Twickenham and later owned a house on Richmond Riverside.	
William Christian Sellé	1813–1898	Doctor of music and Musician in Ordinary to Queen Victoria for 44 years	He lived at Old Palace Terrace, Richmond.	
Leslie Stuart	1863–1928	Composer of Edwardian musical comedy, best known for the hit show Florodora (1899) and many popular songs	He died at his daughter May's home on Richmond Hill in 1928, at the age of 65, and was buried in Richmond Cemetery following a requiem mass at St Elizabeth of Portugal Church	
Sir Huw Wheldon	1916–1986	Broadcaster and BBC executive	He lived at 120 Richmond Hill.	
Rick Wright	1943–2008	Pianist, keyboardist and songwriter	He shared a flat in Richmond with fellow Pink Floyd member Syd Barrett.	

==== Businesspeople ====
Name	Dates	Description	Local connection	Ref
Edward Chapman	1804–1880	Publisher who, with William Hall, founded the publishers Chapman & Hall	He was born in Richmond.	
Sir Angus Ogilvy	1928–2004	Businessman, husband of Princess Alexandra	He lived at Thatched House Lodge in Richmond Park.	
Alec MacKelden	1922–2008	British Army officer, Military Cross recipient and Australian food industry executive	He was born in Richmond.	
Baron Willem van Dedem	1929–2015	Dutch businessman, art collector, art historian and philanthropist	He lived at Trumpeters' House, Richmond.	
Sir Max Waechter	1837–1924	Businessman, art collector, philanthropist and advocate of a federal Europe	He lived in Terrace House on Richmond Hill and owned Glover's Island which he donated to the Borough of Richmond in 1900, helping to preserve the view from Richmond across the river.	

==== Criminals and sinners ====
Name	Dates	Description	Local connection	Ref
Amy Gregory	1872–1956	Murderer, who strangled her daughter to death in 1895	She lived at Albert Road, Richmond.	
Thomas Griffiths Wainewright	1794–1847	Poisoner and transported convict	He was born in Richmond.	

==== Lawyers, politicians and statesmen ====
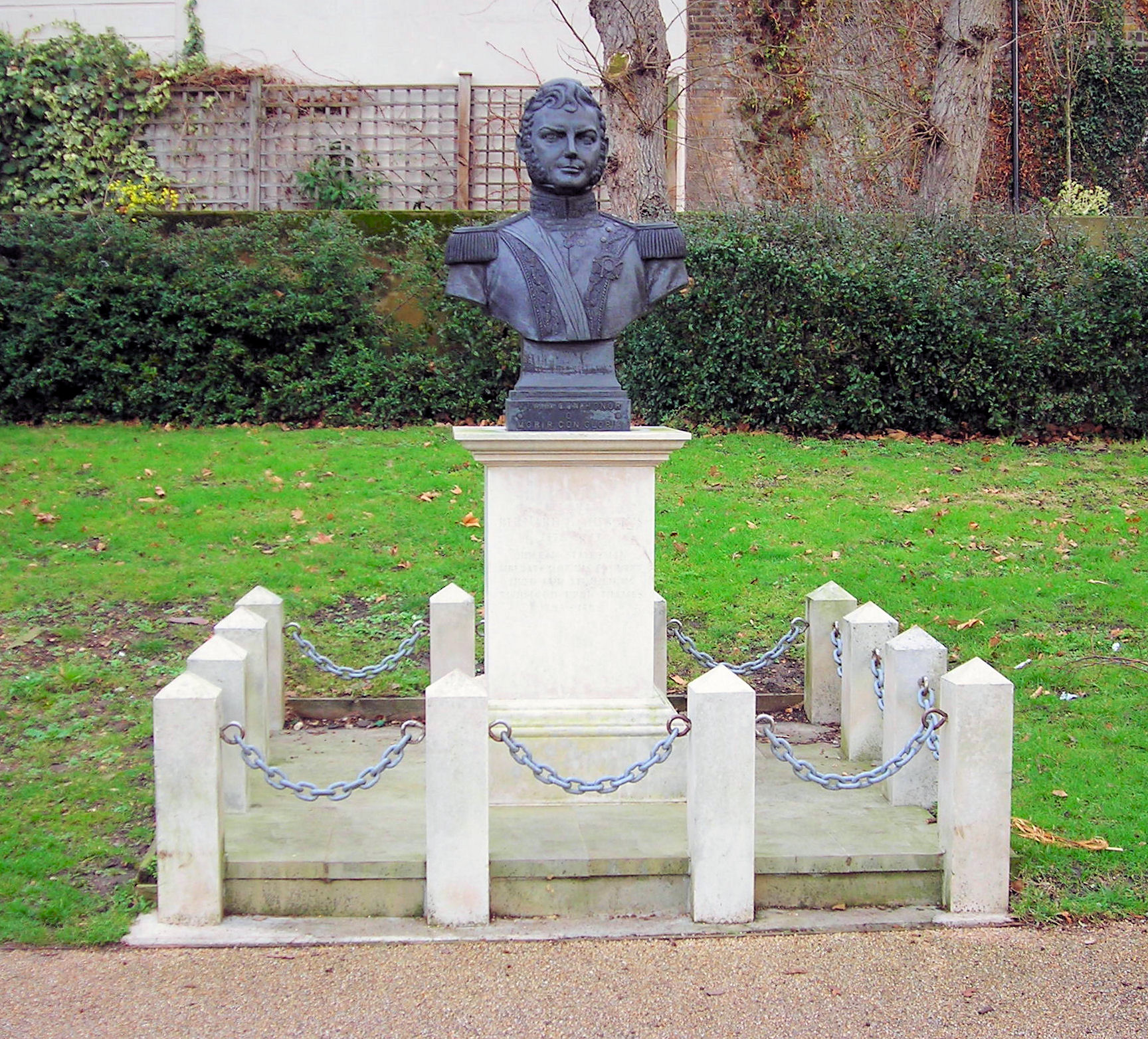
Bernardo O'Higgins statue near Richmond Bridge

Name	Dates	Description	Local connection	Ref
Henry Addington, 1st Viscount Sidmouth	1757–1844	British prime minister from 1801 to 1804	He was given White Lodge, Richmond Park, as a home near London, by George III in 1801. He was created Viscount Sidmouth in 1805, is commemorated in the name Sidmouth Wood at Richmond Park, and was buried in the churchyard of St Mary the Virgin Mortlake.	
Henry Brouncker, 3rd Viscount Brouncker	1627–1688	Courtier and politician	He died at Shene Abbey.	
Sir Charles Burt	1832–1913	Solicitor and local politician who campaigned for the preservation of several important local open spaces	He lived at Hillside House, where he died in 1913. He is buried in Richmond Cemetery together with his wife. His headstone records that "For more than forty years he devoted himself to public work on behalf of the Borough of Richmond and the County of Surrey."	
Richard Edgcumbe, 2nd Earl of Mount Edgcumbe	1764–1839)	Politician and writer on music	He died at his Richmond Hill home and is buried at St Peter's Church, Petersham.	
Bernardo O'Higgins	1778–1842	General, statesman and liberator of Chile	He lived and studied at Clarence House, 2 The Vineyard, Richmond in his late teens. The site is marked by a blue plaque.	
John Russell, 1st Earl Russell	1792–1878	Whig and Liberal politician and twice British prime minister (1846–1852 and 1865–1866)	He lived at Pembroke Lodge, Richmond Park.	
John Russell, 4th Earl Russell	1921–1987	Grandson of the 1st Earl, and son of the philosopher and mathematician Bertrand Russell	He lived at 41 Queen's Road.	
William Selwyn	1775–1855	Lawyer and legal author	Selwyn lived in retirement at Pagoda House, Kew Road, Richmond, an estate inherited from his father in 1817. He provided the site on which St John the Divine, Richmond, the Anglican church in Kew Road, Richmond, was built in the 1830s.	
John Stuart, 3rd Earl of Bute	1713–1792	Botanist and honorary director of Kew Gardens from 1754 to 1772, adviser to Princess Augusta and tutor to George III and, later, prime minister of Great Britain (1762–1763)	Bute lived at King's Cottage, 33 Kew Green. He succeeded Princess Amelia as Ranger of Richmond Park and used White Lodge as an occasional residence from 1761 until his death in 1792.	
Sir Thomas Thynne	c.1610–1669	Lawyer and MP	He had a house at Richmond which was searched for royalist suspects in 1659; his steward and butler were ordered to be arrested.	
Algernon Tollemache	1805–1892	Politician, land speculator and financier	He lived at Wick House prior to his death in 1892.	
John Turner	1929–2020	Prime minister of Canada (June–September 1984)	He was born in Richmond and, with his parents, moved to Canada at the age of two.	
Harold Wilson	1916–1995	British Labour politician, twice prime minister (1964–1970 and 1974–1976)	He lived at Fitzwilliam House, on Little Green, Richmond, during the Second World War.	

==== Royals: at the Manor of Shene/ Richmond Palace ====
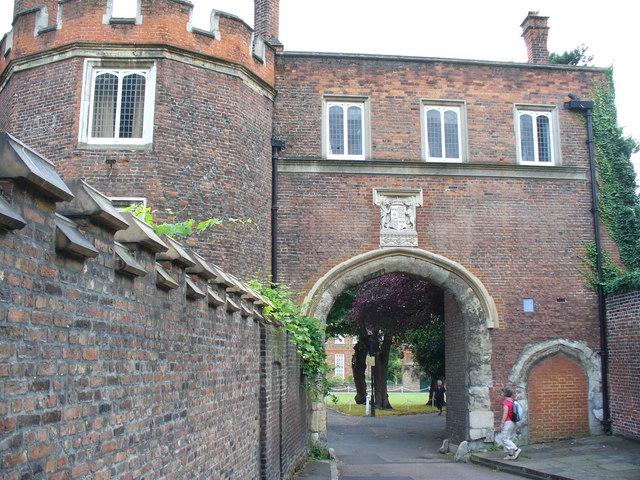
The surviving gatehouse of Richmond Palace

Name	Dates	Description	Local connection	Ref
Anne of Cleves	1515–1557	Fourth wife of King Henry VIII	She was granted Richmond Palace in 1540 after her divorce from Henry and entertained the king and his daughters there on several occasions.	
Edward I	1239–1307	King of England 1272–1307	He resided at Shene (now called Richmond) with his court in 1299.	
Edward III	1312–1377)	King of England 1327–1377	He died at Shene in 1394.	
Elizabeth I	1533–1603	Queen of England and Ireland 1558–1603	She was held prisoner at Richmond Palace during her sister Mary I's reign. She lived in the palace as Queen and died there in 1603.	
Elizabeth Woodville	c.1437–1492	Queen of England 1464–1483, as the wife of King Edward IV	She made the royal manor of Shene her chief residence and held it until it was reclaimed from her by Henry VII in 1486.	
Queen Henrietta Maria	1609–1669	The widowed mother of King Charles II; the US state of Maryland is named after her	She lived briefly at Richmond Palace in 1660.	
Henry I	c.1068–1135	King of England 1100–1135	He resided for a short time in 1125 at the King's House within the Manor of Shene.	
Henry V	1386–1422	King of England 1413–1422	In 1414 he ordered the rebuilding of the royal manor at Shene; this is described as "the kynges grete work".	
Henry VII	1457–1509	King of England 1485–1509	He rebuilt the royal manor of Shene as Richmond Palace and died there in 1509.	
Henry VIII and his first wife, Katherine of Aragon	1491–1547 1485–1536	King of England 1509–1547; King of Ireland 1541–1547 Queen of England 1509–1533	They spent Christmas 1509 at Richmond Palace.	
Henry, Prince of Wales	1594–1612	The eldest son and heir apparent of James VI and I, King of England, Scotland and Ireland; and his wife, Anne of Denmark	He lived in Richmond from 1604 until his premature death in 1612. His improvements to the Palace included a picture gallery for the royal collection.	
Queen Isabella	1295–1358	Widow of King Edward II	She lived at the Manor of Shene.	
James Francis Edward	1688–1766	The son of King James II and VII of England, Scotland and Ireland, and his second wife, Mary of Modena	The future "Old Pretender" was brought to Richmond Palace in 1688 with his wet-nurse after his father, James II, had ordered the reconstruction of part of the palace as the royal nursery.	
Mary I and her consort, Philip II of Spain	1516–1558 1527–1598	Queen of England and Ireland 1553–1558 King of Spain 1556–1598, King of Portugal 1580–1598 and King of England and Ireland 1554–1558	They spent their honeymoon at Hampton Court Palace and Richmond Palace.	
Richard II	1367–1400	King of England 1377–1399	His principal royal residence was at the Manor of Shene. Anne of Bohemia (1366–1394), his queen, died there from the plague. After her death, Richard demolished the Manor. It was subsequently rebuilt – twice – and in 1501 became Richmond Palace.	

==== Royals: in Old Deer Park ====
Name	Dates	Description	Local connection	Ref
George II	1683–1760	King of Great Britain and Ireland 1727–1760	He lived at Ormonde Lodge (also known as Richmond Lodge) in Old Deer Park.	
George III	1738–1820	King of Great Britain and Ireland 1760–1820	When Prince of Wales he purchased Richmond Lodge in 1721 where he lived after his marriage to Charlotte of Mecklenburg-Strelitz until her death.	

==== Royals: in Richmond Park ====
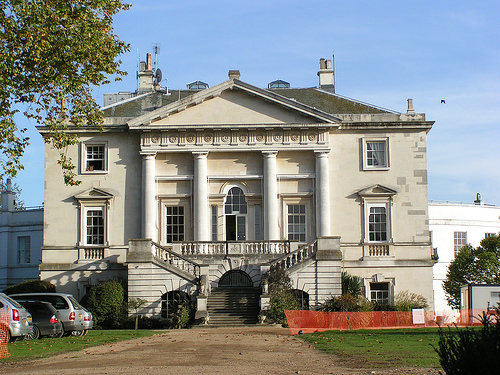
White Lodge, Richmond Park, birthplace of King Edward VIII

Name	Dates	Description	Local connection	Ref
Edward VII	1841–1910	King of the United Kingdom from 1901 until his death in 1910	As Prince of Wales, he was resident at White Lodge, Richmond Park with his tutors in 1858. He and the Princess of Wales (Queen Alexandra (1844–1925) used the house as a weekend residence, from 1867 to 1868.	
Edward VIII	1894–1972	King of the United Kingdom from 20 January to 11 December 1936	He was born at White Lodge – the home of his maternal grandparents, the Duke and Duchess of Teck.	
George VI and Queen Elizabeth	1895–1952 1900–2002	King and Queen of the United Kingdom from 1936 until George VI's death in 1952	As Duke and Duchess of York they lived at White Lodge after their marriage in 1923.	
Princess Mary, Duchess of Gloucester and Edinburgh	1776–1857	The last surviving child of George III, and widow of the second Duke of Gloucester	She lived at White Lodge from 1844 until her death. She was Ranger of Richmond Park from 1850 to 1857.	
Mary of Teck	1867–1953	Queen of the United Kingdom 1910–1936 as wife of George V	She lived at White Lodge with her parents, the Duke and Duchess of Teck, until her marriage in 1893. The couple's engagement took place at Sheen Lodge on 3 May 1893.	
Queen Victoria and Albert, Prince Consort	1819–1901 1819–1861	Victoria was Queen of the United Kingdom from 1837 until her death.	The Queen and the Prince Consort stayed at White Lodge for a while in 1861 after the death of the Queen's mother and a few months before Albert's own death.	

==== Scholars, scientists and engineers ====
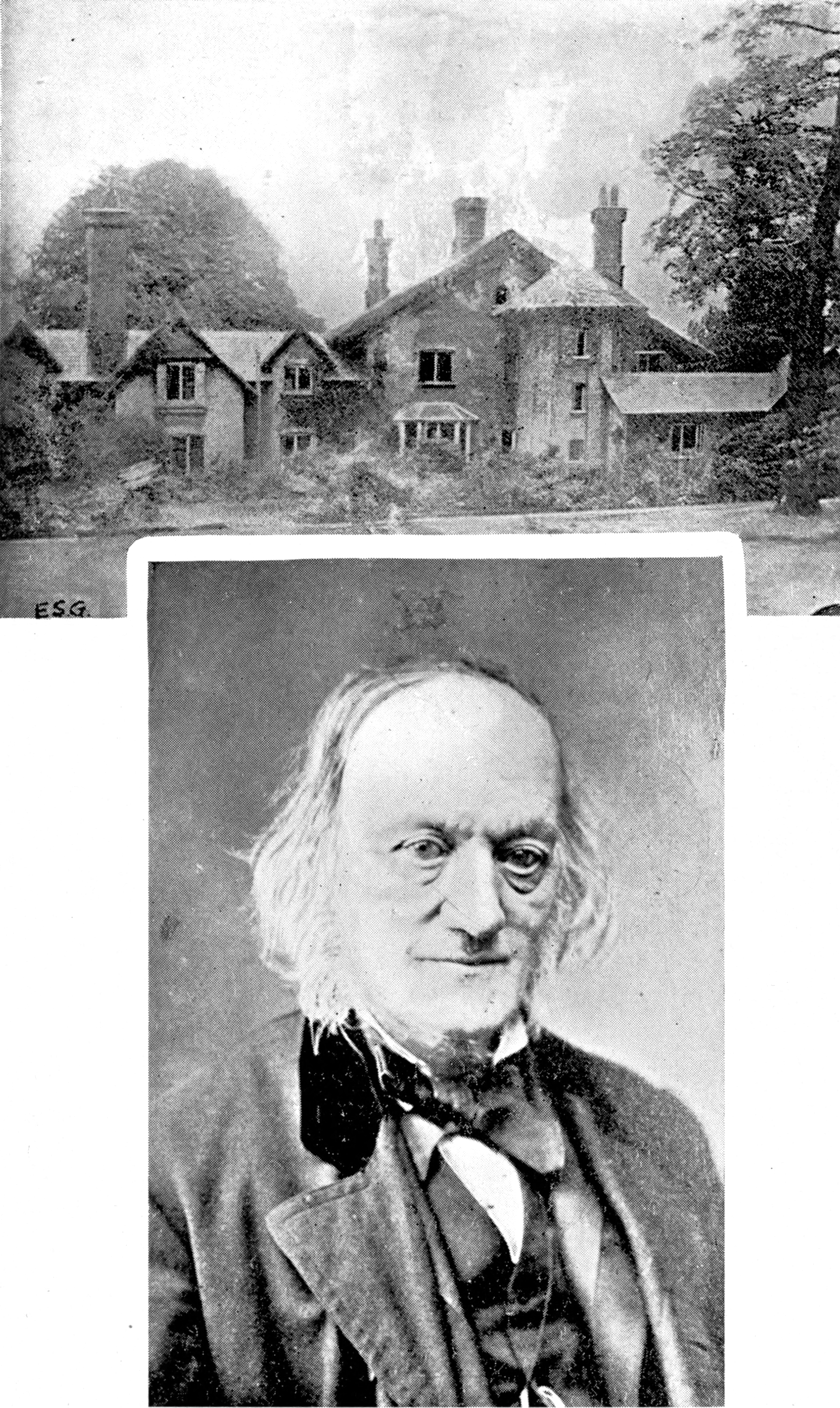
Sir Richard Owen and Sheen Lodge

Name	Dates	Description	Local connection	Ref
Kenneth Clark, Baron Clark	1903–1983	Art historian, author, museum director and broadcaster	He lived at Old Palace Place on Richmond Green.	
William Francis	1817–1904	Scientific author and publisher	He lived at the Manor House, Sheen Road, Richmond.	
Julius Jeffreys	1800–1877	Surgeon and writer, inventor of the respirator and a pioneer in the development of early air conditioning systems	He lived at 9 Park Villas West, Queen's Road.	
Sir Richard Owen	1804–1892	Biologist, comparative anatomist and palaeontologist	He was granted Sheen Cottage in Richmond Park by Queen Victoria in 1852. He died there and is buried at St Andrew's Church, Ham. His family continued to live at Sheen Cottage until 1921.	
Jane Plant	1945–2016	Geochemist, scientist, and author	She lived at 38 Ellerker Gardens, Richmond.	
Stephen Peter Rigaud	1774–1839	Mathematical historian and astronomer	He lived at 21 Richmond Green.	
Bertrand Russell	1872–1970	Mathematician and philosopher	He grew up at Pembroke Lodge between 1876 and 1894 and, later, lived with his son and his son's family at 41 Queen's Road from 1950 to 1956.	
George Mathews Whipple	1842–1893	Physicist, who was superintendent of the Kew Observatory	He lived and died in Richmond.	

==== Social reformers and political activists ====
Name	Dates	Description	Local connection	Ref
Sir Edwin Chadwick	1801–1890	Social reformer noted for his leadership in reforming the Poor Laws in England and instituting major reforms in urban sanitation and public health	He lived at 5 Montague Road, Richmond; the site is marked by a blue plaque.	
Walter Wolfgang	1923–2019	German-born British socialist and peace activist	He lived in Richmond.	

==== Spiritual leaders ====
Name	Dates	Description	Local connection	Ref
Thomas Wolsey, Cardinal Wolsey	1473–1530	Churchman, statesman and lord chancellor of England	His places of residence included Richmond Lodge, which was on a site near the King's Observatory.	

==== Sportsmen and sportswomen ====
Name	Dates	Description	Local connection	Ref
Edgar Ball	1892–1969	Cricketer; a left-handed batsman, he played three first-class matches for Somerset.	He was born in Richmond.	
William East	1866–1933	Rower and sculler	He lived in Richmond where, later in life, he became a publican and ran the Prince's Head hotel and then The Pigeon hotel.	
Peter Jaffe	1913–1982	Sailor and Olympic silver medallist	He was born in Richmond.	
Robert Long	1846–1924	Cricketer, who made two first-class appearances for Surrey	He was born in Richmond.	
Betty Nuthall	1911–1983	Tennis player, who won the women's singles title at the US Championships in 1930	She grew up in Richmond.	

==== Warriors and explorers ====
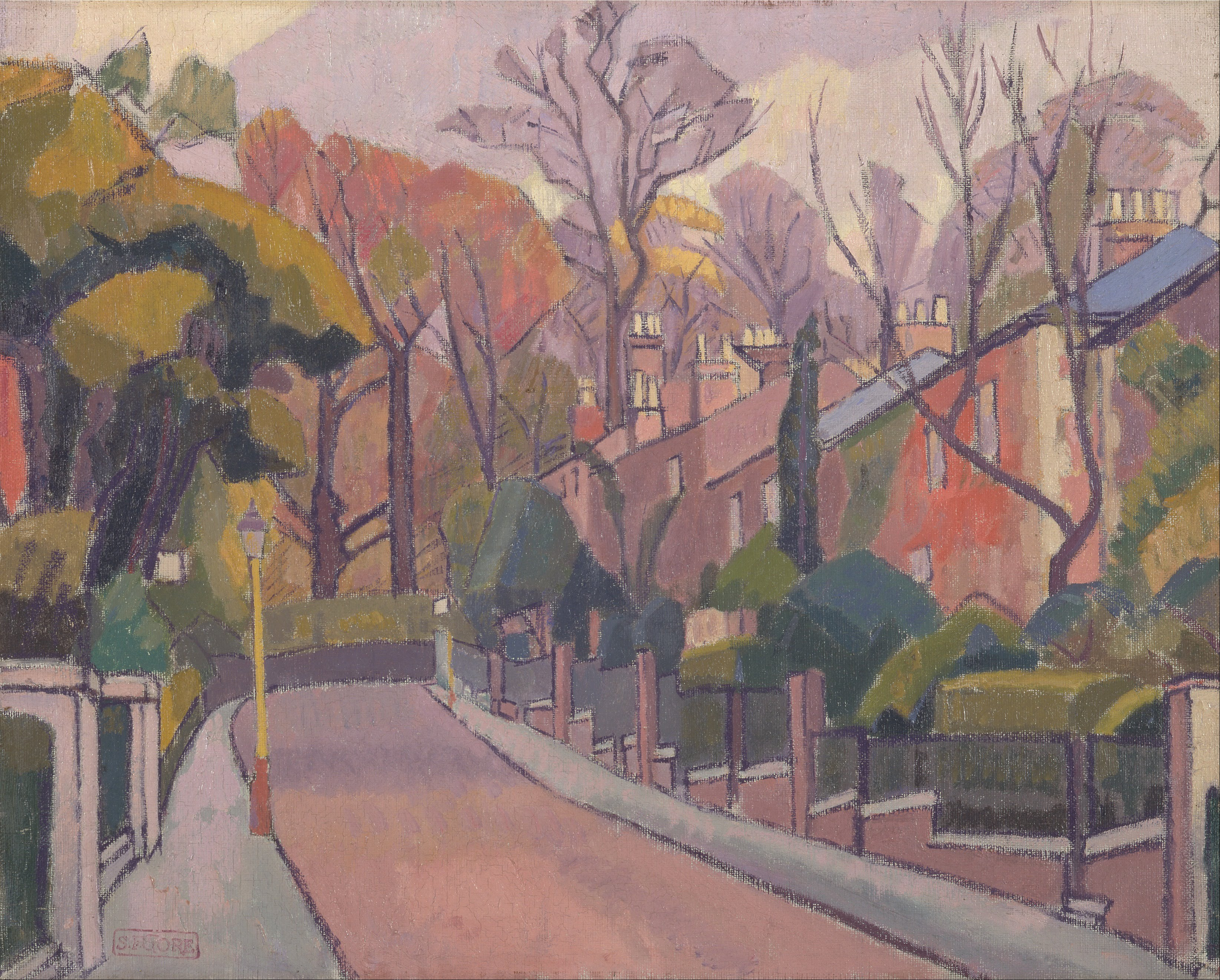
Spencer Gore's painting of Cambrian Road, Richmond, where he lived

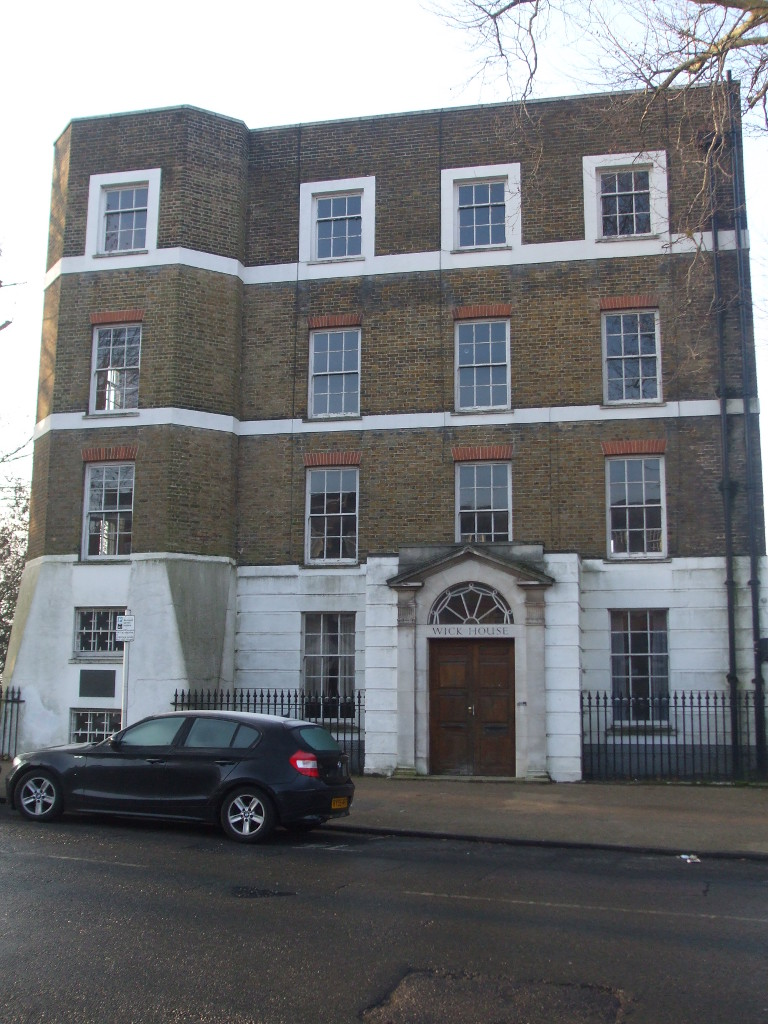
Wick House, home of Sir Joshua Reynolds and, later, Algernon Tollemache

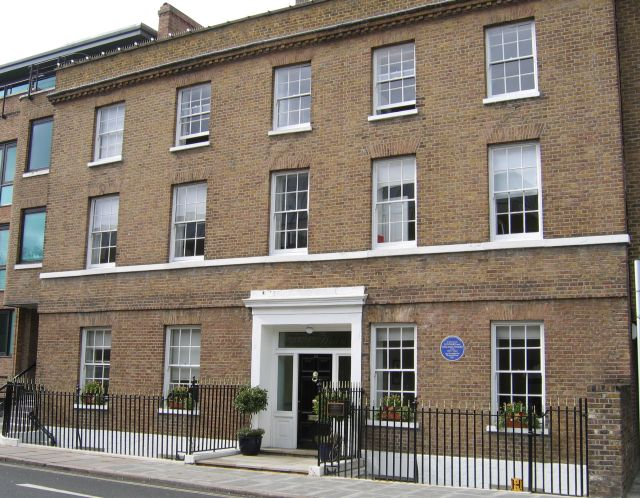
Hogarth House, 34 Paradise Road, Richmond, where Virginia Woolf and her husband Leonard lived

Name	Dates	Description	Local connection	Ref
Thomas Allistone (or Allison)	1823–1896	Soldier in the 11th Hussars who took part in the Charge of the Light Brigade	He lived and died in Richmond.	
Sir Richard Burton	1821–1890	Explorer, translator and writer	He lived at Maids of Honour Row in Richmond while attending the Richmond Academy, which was situated in a mansion at the corner of Little Green and Duke Street. He and his wife are buried in a remarkable tomb in the shape of a Bedouin tent in the churchyard of St Mary Magdalen Roman Catholic Church, Mortlake, where there is also a memorial window to him.	
Frederick Jeremiah Edwards	1894–1964	Irish recipient of the Victoria Cross (VC)	He died at the Royal Star and Garter Home in Richmond and is buried in Richmond Cemetery.	
Lieutenant General Bernard Cyril Freyberg, 1st Baron Freyberg	1889–1963	Governor-general of New Zealand from 1946 to 1952	He was born on Richmond Hill and moved with his parents at the age of two to New Zealand.	
Young Bingham Hutchinson	1806–1870	Royal Navy officer, early explorer and settler of South Australia	He was born in Richmond.	
General Sir Harry North Dalrymple Prendergast	1834–1913	Awarded a VC for conspicuous bravery in the Indian Rebellion of 1857	He died at Heron Court, Richmond and is buried in Richmond Cemetery.	
Brigadier Raymond Sandover	1910–1995	British Army officer who served in the Australian Army; awarded the DSO and ED and was mentioned in despatches; commanded the 2/11th Battalion (Australia) and 6th Brigade	He was born in Richmond.	
Walter Leigh Rayfield	1881–1949	Canadian recipient of the Victoria Cross	He was born in Richmond.	
Nancy Wake	1912–2011	New Zealand-born nurse and journalist who fought alongside the French Resistance in World War II	She lived in Richmond's Royal Star and Garter Home from 2003 until her death.	

==== Writers and artists ====
Name	Dates	Description	Local connection	Ref
Mary Elizabeth Braddon	1837–1915	Popular novelist	She and her husband, the publisher John Maxwell (1824–1895), lived at Lichfield House in Sheen Road, Richmond, where she died in 1915.	
Katharine Harris Bradley	1846–1914	Author of poetry and verse drama. She and her niece and ward Edith Emma Cooper (1862–1913) wrote together under the pseudonym Michael Field.	They lived at 1 The Paragon, Petersham Road, from 1899 to 1913.	
Frances Browne	1816–1879	Irish-born poet, novelist, and writer of short stories for children	She died at 19 St John's Grove and was buried in Richmond Cemetery.	
Joan Carlile	1600–1679	One of the first English women to practise painting professionally	She is believed to have lived at Petersham Lodge in Richmond Park during the Commonwealth period with her husband Lodovic, keeper/deputy ranger at the park. Petersham Lodge was demolished in 1835.	
Edwin Beresford Chancellor	1868–1937	Author known for his works on the history of London and it environs	He was born in Richmond.	
Geoffrey Chaucer	c.1343–1400	Poet and courtier	He was appointed Yeoman of the King's Chamber in 1368 and served at Shene (now Richmond).	
Mary Anne Evans	1819–1880	Novelist who wrote under the name George Eliot	She lived at 7 Clarence Row, East Sheen from May to September 1855 and at 8 Parkshot, Richmond from October 1855 to February 1859, when she moved to Wandsworth. While living in Richmond she assumed the name of George Eliot and began her first novel Amos Barton (later retitled Scenes of Clerical Life) and started writing Adam Bede.	
George Gale	1929–2003	Cartoonist	He lived in Ham and on Little Green, Richmond.	
Bamber Gascoigne	1935–2022	Author and TV presenter	He lived in Richmond from the late 1960s until his death.	
Spencer Gore	1878–1914	Artist; first president of the Camden Town Group	He painted a series of thirty-two landscapes in Richmond Park during the last months of his life. His painting From a Window in Cambrian Road, Richmond shows the view from a top-floor window at the rear of 6 Cambrian Road, near the park's Cambrian Gate entrance, where he and his family moved to in 1913. This may be the last picture Gore worked on before his early death from pneumonia.	
Maxwell Gray (Mary Gleed Tuttiett)	1846–1923	Novelist and poet, best known for her 1886 novel The Silence of Dean Maitland	She lived in west Richmond from 1895.	
William Harvey	1796 –1866	Wood-engraver and illustrator	He lived and died at Prospect Lodge, Richmond.	
Augustin Heckel	1690–1770	German-born artist	He lived in Richmond from 1746 until his death. His A West View of Richmond etc. in Surrey from the Star and Garter on the Hill, published in 1752, became widely known after being engraved by Charles Grignion the Elder.	
Clive King	1924–2018	Author, best known for his children's book Stig of the Dump	He was born in Richmond.	
William McMillan	1887–1977	Scottish sculptor	In his later years he lived at 3 Cholmondley Walk, Richmond.	
Ludovic Rodo Pissarro	1878–1952	Engraver	He lived at 21 Peldon Avenue, Richmond (destroyed during The Blitz) from 1919 to 1921.	
Sir Joshua Reynolds	1723–1792	Artist	He lived from 1772 to 1792 at Wick House which was built for him by Sir William Chambers in 1772.	
Charles Ricketts	1866–1931	Artist, illustrator, author and printer	He lived from 1898 to 1902 at 8 Spring Terrace, Paradise Road, Richmond.	
Charles Shannon	1863–1937	Artist best known for his portraits	He is recorded in the 1901 census as living at 8 Spring Terrace, Paradise Road, Richmond.	
Richard Brinsley Sheridan	1751–1816	Playwright, poet, theatre owner and MP	He owned Downe House, Richmond Hill.	
James Thomson	1700–1748	Poet, known for The Seasons and the lyrics to "Rule Britannia!"	He lived in a cottage, which later became part of Richmond Royal Hospital, in Kew Foot Road, Richmond from 1736 until his death in 1748. The site is marked by a blue plaque. There is a memorial to him in Richmond Park.	
Fred Viner	1858–1940	Watercolour artist	Viner, who was born in East Sheen, was living in Sheen Road at the time of the 1901 Census. He had a studio on The Quadrant.	
Virginia Woolf	1882–1941	Novelist	She and her husband Leonard Woolf (1880–1969) founded the Hogarth Press and lived at 17 The Green from October 1914. From 1915 they lived at Hogarth House, 34 Paradise Road, Richmond, which is marked by a blue plaque. A turning point in Woolf's literary career was the publication of her short story "Kew Gardens" in 1918, inspired by the botanical gardens in Kew.	

==== Other people ====
Name	Dates	Description	Local connection	Ref
Albert Barkas	1861–1921	Librarian who established what is now the London Borough of Richmond upon Thames' Local Studies Collection	He lived on Little Green, Richmond.	
John Dodd	1752–1839	Bowmaker	He died in extreme poverty at Richmond workhouse.	
Elizabeth Herbert, Countess of Pembroke	1737–1831	Aristocrat	She lived at Pembroke Lodge, Richmond Park.	
