= Cardigan =

Cardigan may refer to:

- Cardigan (sweater), a type of knitted open-front garment

== Arts and media ==
- Cardigan, a newborn lamb in Charlotte's Web 2: Wilbur's Great Adventure
- Cardigan (film), a lost 1922 silent film based on a novel by Robert W. Chambers

=== Music ===
- The Cardigans, a Swedish pop group
- "Cardigan" (song), a 2020 single by Taylor Swift from the album Folklore
- "Cardigan", a 2020 song by Don Toliver from the album Heaven or Hell
- "Cardigan", a 2021 song by Ravi and Wonstein
- § Musicians

== Places ==
- Cardigan, Victoria, a region in Australia
- Cardigan, Prince Edward Island, Canada
  - Cardigan (electoral district), an electoral district in Prince Edward Island
- Cardigan, Ceredigion, Wales
  - Cardigan (UK Parliament constituency)
  - Cardigan Castle
  - Cardigan Island, a small uninhabited island north of Cardigan, Ceredigion
- Mount Cardigan, a mountain in New Hampshire, U.S.
- Cardigan House, a former house in London, England

== People ==
- Cardigan Connor (born 1961), Anguillan cricketer

=== Musicians ===
- Chaz Cardigan (born 1995), American singer
- Cora Cardigan (1860–1931), English flutist

== Other uses ==
- Earl of Cardigan, a title in the Peerage of England
  - James Brudenell, 7th Earl of Cardigan, British general during the Crimean War after whom the sweater is named
- SS Bury Hill or SS Cardigan, a British steamship

== See also ==
- Cardigan Welsh Corgi, a breed of dog
- Cardiganshire, a historic county in Wales
  - Kingdom of Ceredigion for which the county is named
