= Wick House, Richmond Hill =

Grade II listed house in London, England

Wick House
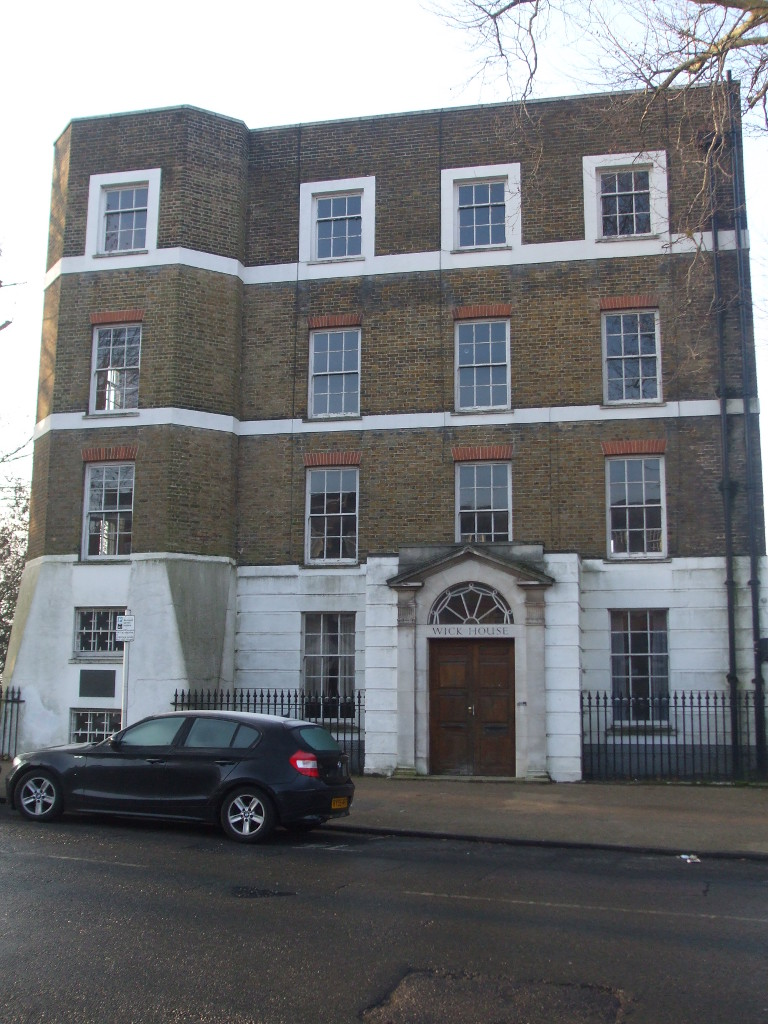
- Wick House, Richmond Hill
- Interactive map of the Wick House area

General information
- Status: Completed
- Type: house
- Architectural style: Georgian
- Location: Richmond Hill, 144 Richmond Hill, Richmond TW10 6RN, Petersham, London, England
- Coordinates: 51.4515°N 0.2979°W
- Construction started: 1771
- Completed: 1772
- Client: Sir Joshua Reynolds

Technical details
- Floor count: 4
- Floor area: 8,785 square feet (816.2 m^{2})

Design and construction
- Architect: William Chambers
- Designations: Grade II listed building

Listed Building – Grade II
- Official name: Wick House
- Designated: 25 May 1983
- Reference no.: 1263475

Wick House is a Grade II listed house in Petersham, London (historically in Surrey), located near the corner of Nightingale Lane and Richmond Hill. The painter Sir Joshua Reynolds commissioned the house from Sir William Chambers and it was completed in 1772.

== History ==
The upper section of Richmond Hill on which Wick House is built has, historically, been within the parish boundaries of Petersham. The road on which it stands was known as the Causey or Causeway, King's Highway or Upper Highway. This was part of a main route between Richmond and Petersham until the construction of the present route of the Petersham Road in 1773, as the previous alternative route on the lower part of Richmond Hill was frequently impassable.

Richmond Park was enclosed by King Charles I in 1637, taking 306 acres (124 ha) of Petersham within it, most of which was common land. Richmond Gate, situated on the Causeway, was one of the original six entry gates into the Park. Wick House lies about a hundred metres from Richmond Gate on the northern boundary of the remaining section of Petersham Common.

Terrace Walk was laid out at the top of Richmond Hill in the later 18th century, followed by construction of a number of fine homes including Wick House.

The site overlooks the River Thames and shares the notable view from Richmond Hill.

== Construction ==
Wick House was originally commissioned by Sir Joshua Reynolds from Sir William Chambers in 1771. Reynold's indecision about his requirements was a great annoyance to Chambers. Reynolds lived in the house from 1772 to his death in 1792. He participated in local affairs and is recorded to have attended meetings of Petersham Vestry. Not noted as a landscape painter, he nonetheless painted the famous view from his home in about 1778. The oil on canvas, 46 x 62 cm painting is now at the Orleans House Gallery. Turner is said to have selected the location of his home in Twickenham as he would be able to see Reynolds' house from his window.

== Subsequent inhabitants and alterations ==
In 1804 the Vestry Overseer and Constable ordered that the inhabitants of the poor houses "remove hog styes & other nuisances that are against the premises of Mrs Lyall". The offending poor houses were subsequently demolished and the land, along with part of the common, were sold to the owner of Wick House for an extension to the garden. The £250 raised from the sale was used in 1809 towards construction of new poor houses at the foot of the common.

Mr and Mrs William Burn, who died in 1821 and 1836 respectively, lived at Wick House and their benevolent fostering of orphans in the house is commemorated on a plaque on the organ gallery wall of Petersham Parish Church. Algernon Gray Tollemache lived at Wick House prior to his death in 1892.

The house was extended and altered during the Victorian and Edwardian periods.

In the late 1940s, funds were raised by the Joint Committee of the Order of St John and the British Red Cross Society to purchase the building as a home for the nurses of the neighbouring Royal Star and Garter Home for disabled sailors, soldiers and airmen. Lord Wakehurst, Vice-Chairman of the Joint Committee, opened the home in a ceremony in 1950. Much of the remaining original interior was altered during the subsequent multi-occupancy conversion for 20 nurses. In this form its total floorspace is 8,785 square feet (816.2 m^{2}).

Wick House was designated as a Grade II listed building on 25 May 1983.

== Future ==
The plan to relocate the Star and Garter Home in 2013 created uncertainty about the future of Wick House. In 2007 the local authority recommended that "Wick House should be marketed with retention of the existing non-self contained residential accommodation, in the form of a hostel or staff/student accommodation." A consultation draft planning document was also issued by the London Borough of Richmond upon Thames in 2008.
