= Downe House, Richmond Hill =

Grade II listed house in the London Borough of Richmond upon Thames

Coordinates: 51.4531°N 0.2989°W

Downe House
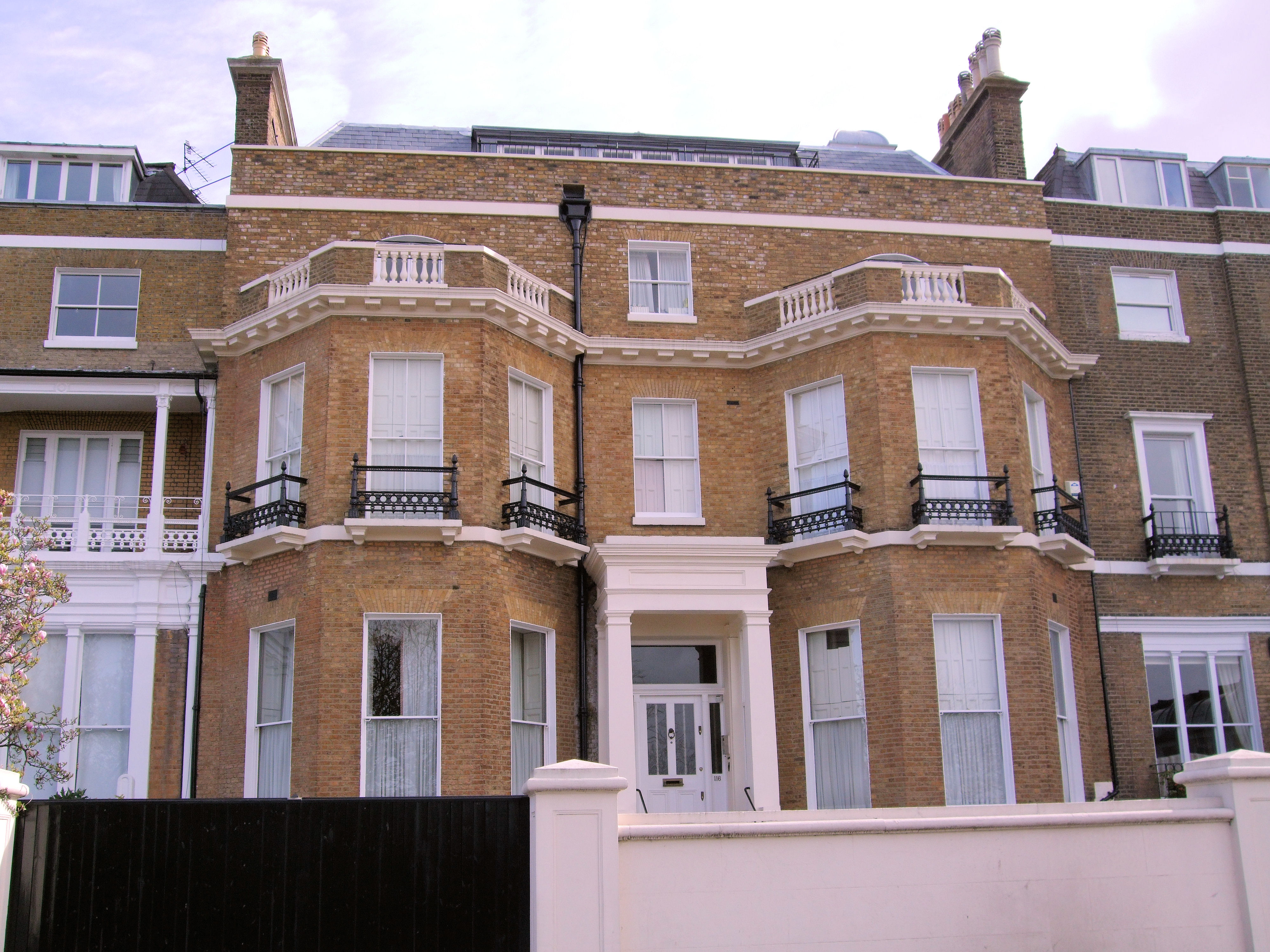
- Interactive map of the Downe House area

General information
- Type: Residential
- Architectural style: Georgian
- Location: Richmond upon Thames, London, England
- Completed: 1780

Technical details
- Structural system: Brick and stone
- Floor count: 4

Listed Building – Grade II
- Official name: Downe Housee
- Designated: 24 December 1968
- Reference no.: 1249949

Downe House is a Grade II listed house on Richmond Hill, in the London Borough of Richmond upon Thames, which has been occupied by playwright Richard Brinsley Sheridan, The Rolling Stones' lead vocalist Mick Jagger and model Jerry Hall.

== Description ==
The Georgian house dates from c. 1780, is on part of Richmond Hill and overlooks the Thames; the apex of the Thames side of the hill marks the start of Richmond Park which itself forms the plateau at the top of the hill, the largest urban park in the United Kingdom. The home was built of brown brick with yellow window dressing. It includes four storeys and a basement with bays on either side and balconies above. It features modillion cornice and balustrading above and cast-iron balustrades on the second floor windows. Windows above the bays are round-headed, and others are square-headed sash windows. The porch has heavy entablature and Doric piers.

== History ==
Part of the Royal Manor of Richmond since Domesday, Richmond Park was enclosed by King Charles I around 1635 as a post-medieval deer park. The manor was mostly agricultural land in the early 18th century, but Terrace Walk was laid out at the top of Richmond Hill in the later 18th century, followed by construction of further grand houses, including Downe House. The house was built circa 1780, and at one time was owned by Richard Brinsley Sheridan.

Mick Jagger bought the house in the early 1990s and lived there with his longtime partner, model Jerry Hall. After the two separated, Jerry Hall remained in Downe House while Jagger moved into a flat next door. It is listed as Grade II by Historic England.
