= Thomson's Aeolian Harp =

Painting by J. M. W. Turner

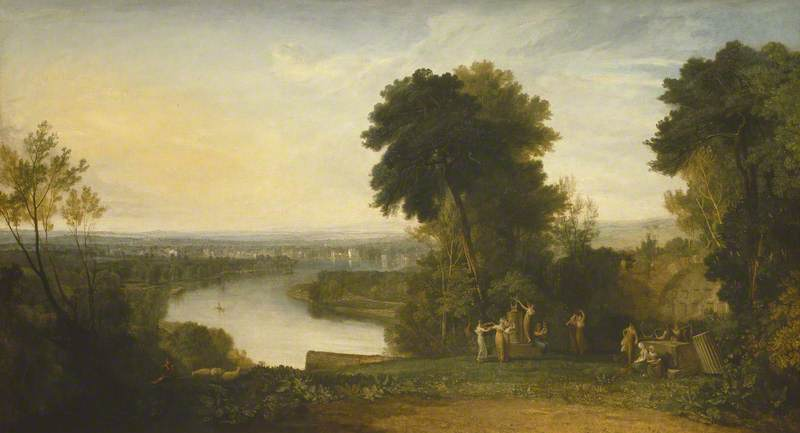
- Artist: J. M. W. Turner
- Year: 1809
- Dimensions: 166.7 cm × 306 cm (65.6 in × 120 in)
- Location: Manchester Art Gallery

Thomson's Aeolian Harp is an 1809 landscape painting by J. M. W. Turner. The oil painting shows the view overlooking the River Thames from Richmond Hill, London. On the hill, there is a classical scene featuring a variety of figures and an Aeolian harp: an homage to poet James Thomson.

It is currently displayed at Manchester Art Gallery.

== Subject ==
The midground of Thomson's Aeolian Harp features an S-shaped portion of the River Thames with small boats scattered along it. The river is flanked by dark-green forests and lined by an assembling of buildings. A feathery tree prominently sticks up in the left of the canvas.

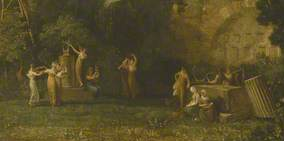
J. M. W. Turner, Thomson's Aeolian Harp (detail)— note the Three Graces dancing, the golden harp, the Four Seasons, and the figures around the plinth

The painting's foreground is set atop Richmond Hill— which has a strip of grass bound by a patch of barren earth in front and foliage behind— featuring a variety of figures. To the left of the hill where there the brush is thicker, a shepherd boy plays a pipe, surrounded by three sheep. The Three Graces are present, barefoot, holding hands, and circling around in a ring; to the right of them are the Four Seasons— all of these figures wearing 18th-century classical dress. Between the two sets of figures is a pedestal inscribed with the name "THOMSON" which bears a golden harp; the harp is being donned with a garland by one of the women. To the right of the Four Seasons is a plinth that surrounds a group of people: in front lay two women, the elder reading a book next to a basket, the other sitting with a sheath of corn besides her; to the left of the women is a man in a ruff talking to the younger woman; behind the plinth sits two agricultural workers, one holding a scythe.

== Style ==
Thomson's Aeolian Harp is a pastoral landscape— as was a popular style of the time— characterized by atmospheric background in soft light in a lush, imaginary utopia, typically featuring classical figures (such as nymphs, satyrs, and shepherds). The work is a radical treatment of the popular subject of the River Thames linking an English landscape with the grand style.

== Influence and references ==
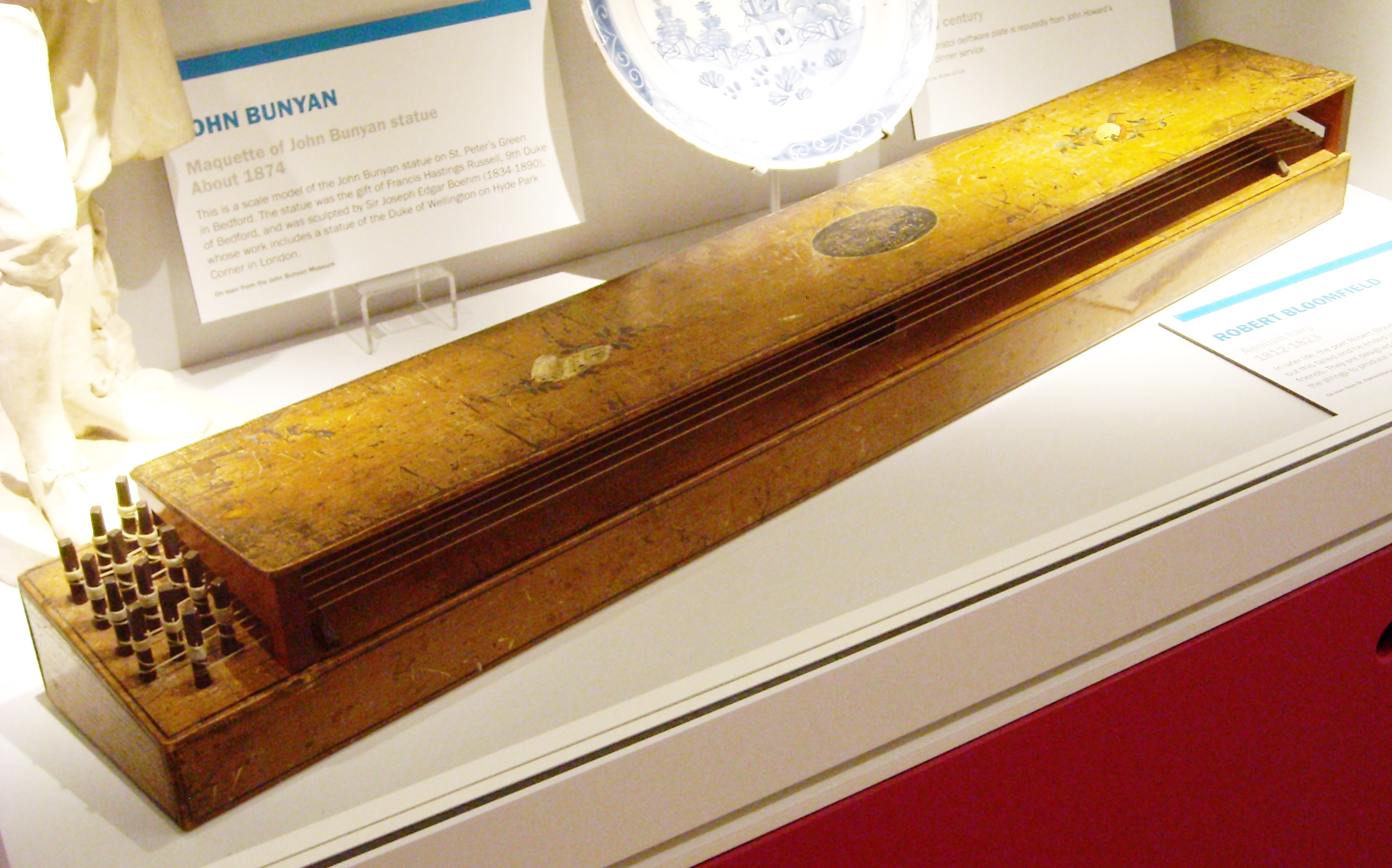
An 1800s Aeolian harp made by Robert Bloomfield

The painting (as the title suggests) pays homage to poet James Thomson and his poem "An Ode to Aeolus’s Harp." The poem praises the Aeolian harp— a popular symbol of the Romantics as it was a harp that could only be played by nature via the wind; the name references Aeolus, the ruler of the winds. Below is the poem's first stanza:

Aetherial race, inhabitants of air!
Who hymn your God amid the secret grove;
Ye unseen beings to my harp repair,
And raise majestic strains, or melt in love.

Thomson was influential to Turner's earlier work and his poems were previously quoted in catalog entries at the Royal Academy. Further references to Thomson include the pedestal featuring his last name, the scene being close to where Thomson lived and died, the inclusion of the Four Seasons is a reference to another Thomson poem: The Four Seasons.

The classical ruins behind the figures on the right of the painting reference the 1807 demolition of Twickenham villa of poet Alexander Pope.

Turner took influence from seventeenth-century French painter Claude Lorrain's depictions of Italian landscapes.

== Exhibition ==
In 1809, Turner exhibited Thomson's Aeolian Harp at the Royal Academy. In the catalog, he included a poem to go along with the work:

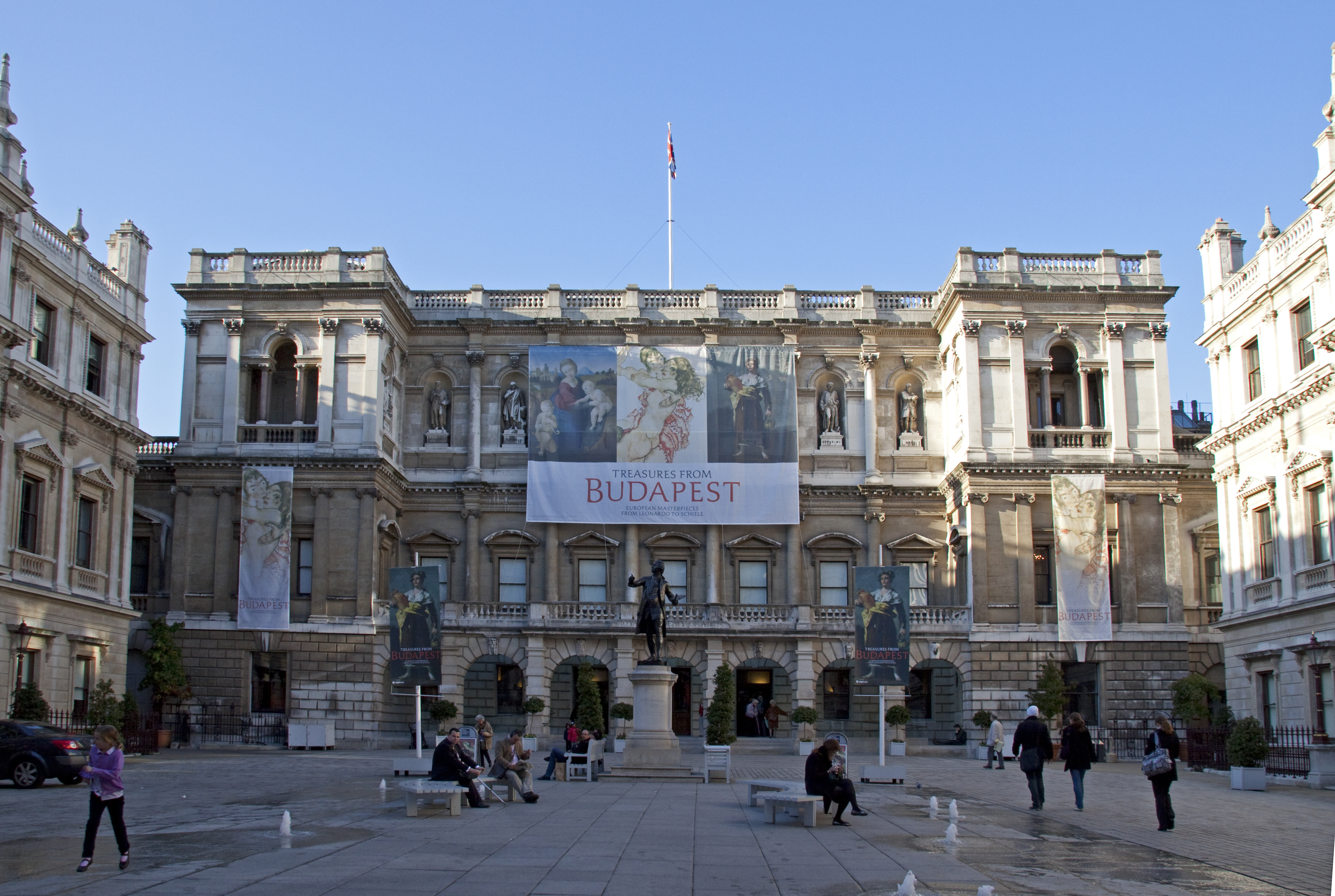
Modern view of the Royal Academy where Thomson's Aeolian Harp was displayed

To a gentleman in Putney, requesting him to place one on his grounds.

On Thomson’s tomb the dewy drops distil,
Soft tears of Pity shed for Pope’s lost fame (Note: May be a misprint of "fane" (as in a temple or shrine) which was written in a draft of the verse)
To worth and verse adheres sad memory still,
Scorning to wear ensnaring fashion’s chain.
In silence go, fair Thames, for all is laid;
His pastoral reeds untied, and reeds unstrung,
Sunk in their harmony in Twickenham’s glade,
While flows thy stream, unheeded and unsung
Resplendent Seasons! chase oblivion’s shade,
Where liberal hands bid Thomson’s lyre arise;
From Putney’s height he nature’s hues survey’d,
And mark’d each beauty with enraptur’d eyes.
The kindly place amid thy upland groves
Th’ Æolian harp, attun’d to nature’s strains,
Melliferous greeting every air that roves
From Thames’ broad bosom or her verdant plains,
Inspiring Spring! with renovating fire,
Well pleas’d, rebind those reeds Alexis play’d,
And breathing balmy kisses to the Lyre.
Give one soft note to lost Alexis’ shade.
Let Summer shed her many blossoms fair,
To shield the trembling strings in noon-tide ray;
While ever and anon the dulcet air
Shall rapturous thrill, or sigh in sweets away.
Bind not the Poppy in the golden hair,
Autumn! kind giver of the full ear’d sheaf;
Those notes have often echo’d to thy care
Check not their sweetness with thy falling leaf.
Winter! thy sharp cold winds bespeak decay;
Thy snow-fraught robe with let pity ’zone entwine,
That gen’rous care shall memory repay,
Bending with her o’er Thomson’s hallow’d shrine

The work is currently on display at the Manchester Art Gallery.

== See also ==
- List of paintings by J. M. W. Turner
- Pope's Villa at Twickenham
