= Cora Cardigan =

English virtuoso flautist

Cora Cardigan was the stage name of Hannah Rosetta Dinah Parks (1860 – 1931), an English virtuoso flautist known as the 'Queen of Flute Players' who worked mainly in theatres. She performed throughout Europe and the United States, and was known for her skill playing the flute, piccolo and violin.

== Early life ==
She was born Hannah Rosetta Dinah Moulton in 1860, Clerkenwell, illegitimate daughter of Rosetta Moulton (born 1833). The Era (newspaper) gave her birth as 18 September. On the 1861 Census the family were living at Hermes Street, Clerkenwell. By 1871 she had been adopted and lived with the family of her aunt, Caroline Parks (née Moulton, b 1836), and her husband Henry Thomas Parks (1823–1903), "Professor of Flute", in Leyton, Essex; her occupation was given as "Scholar And Flute Player".

== Career ==
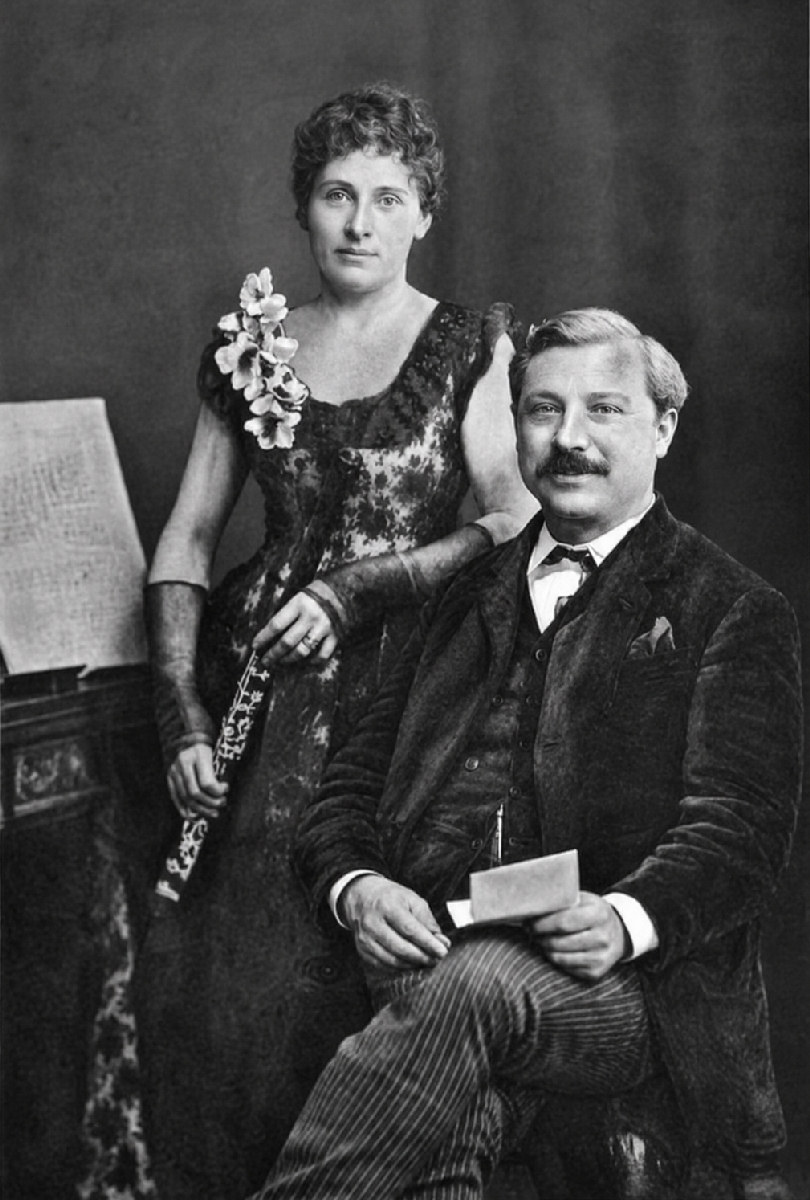
Louis and Hannah Honig, 1889

She was performing in Music Halls from as early as 1879, including touring the United States in 1880 for two years with M. B. Leavitt's Grand English Operatic Burlesque Company, where she "played concerts in 178 towns in America". Later in 1882 she appeared at the Opera Comique with Lila Clay and her Musical and Dramatic Company of Ladies, described as "one of the greatest, if not the chief, success of the opening section of the entertainment. This was a thoroughly legitimate performance, and the spontaneous manner in which the audience cheered and encored it testified to its effectiveness".

She studied under her father, who was a music teacher, and completed her education at the Guildhall School of Music, performing in student concerts in 1884, where she "fairly astonished her hearers by her facility of execution in a flute fantasia, but this lady can scarcely be called a student." There she studied under Richard Shepherd Rockstro (1826–1906), solo flutist at Covent Garden Opera and author of several books on the flute. Her first performance was at the Royal Music Hall, Holborn, then at the Oxford, and the Royal Aquarium. She then gave concerts in Prince's Hall (17 February 1885) and then toured in Britain and Europe.

Early in her career she was described as a 'Musical Novelty' or 'Musical Eccentrics'; a reviewer in 1885 wrote that she was "the best of female flautists" and "is the most modest instrumentalist we have ever encountered; in fact, the absence of self-assertion in her character has done nothing to assist her career." At a concert at The South London Palace, Lambeth, in 1887 she was described as "an accomplished flautist, and plays the piccolo like an angel. She gets a beautiful tone from the latter instrument, which is so much abused in our London orchestras. It is a genuine pleasure to hear this young lady execute difficult variations on either instrument without flaw or fault of any kind. She glides over most arduous passages with an ease and certainty that can only come of steady, patient, persevering practice. She was deservedly recalled twice after a performance that proved one of the pleasantest experiences of the evening."

A guest performance in the Berlin Reichshallen Theatre in 1885 was apparently regarded as one of the highlights of her career, "where her engagement was extended for 28 performances". She also appeared in Nice. An article in The Musical Herald and Tonic Sol-Fa Reporter by John Curwen in 1889 called her 'The Queen of Flute Players' and described how she always performed from memory. "Her performances, a music hall manager said, were appreciated by him because they helped to raise the music halls above the level of clever comic singers and acrobats. Miss Cardigan was so successful that her services were retained for upwards of fifty successive nights at the Royal Aquarium, and she has been heard in almost every large town in the Kingdom“.

She appeared at the opening of the Paragon Theatre of Varieties in 1885, the Bow and Bromley recitals, the Covent Garden Promenade Concerts, and at the opening of the Metropolitan Theatre in 1897. In 1891 she performed for the Prince of Wales. She later performed works composed by her husband and performed with him at the Theatre Royal, Richmond.

Her playing was remarkable for brilliancy of execution, and purity of tone. She was described as "Probably the most famous of all English lady flute players”. Rockstro wrote "The excellent and brilliant performer Miss Cora Cardigan ( Mrs. Louis Honig ), known as the 'Queen of Flute-Players' always plays on an ebonite flute. The charming quality of the tone that this talented lady elicits from her instrument is too well known to need any panegyric in these pages." Another reviewer wrote "I have heard a lady flautist – Miss Cora Cardigan – on several occasions. I heard her play some most difficult pieces in excellent style, and I am still waiting to listen to a better performer“ (Musical Opinion and Music Trade Review 1889, Oct., S. 29).

She seems to have stopped performing about 1908. In some of her last performances she appeared with her pianist daughter Pauline and stepdaughter Marguerite Honig. Pauline went on to tour with Madame Levante's Orchestra of Ladies.

== Personal life ==
She married the composer and pianist Louis Honig (1849–1906) at St John the Divine, Richmond on 14 January 1889. Their daughters born in Richmond were Pauline (1889-1982) and Lucy (1891–1892).

In 1914 she was living at Lancaster Road, Kensington. She died 17 March 1931 at Rochford, Essex, which is where her daughter, Pauline Lethbridge and grand-daughter Juanita (1917-1996), were living.
