= Richmond Hill, London =

Hill in London, England

Coordinates: 51°27′10″N 0°17′57″W

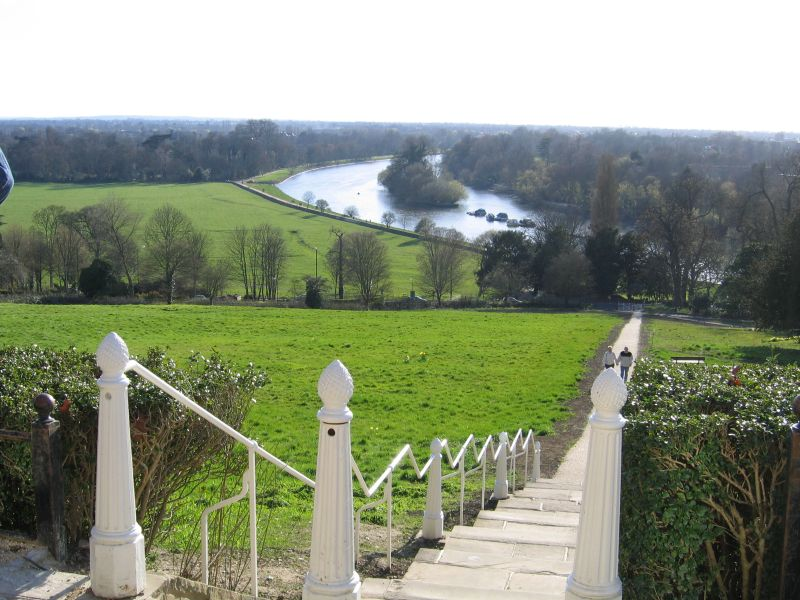
A south-westerly view from Terrace Walk on Richmond Hill

Richmond Hill in Richmond and Petersham, London, is a hill that begins gently in the north and north-east side of Richmond town and through its former fields, orchards and vineyard to a point just within Richmond Park, the deer park emparked and enclosed by Charles I.

Richmond Hill shares postcodes with Ham and Petersham TW10.

== Toponym ==
The last two syllables (mond, hill) are an unlinked pleonasm (tautology). Mond (Note: Mound and Mount are corruptions of mont, as is the non-word mond, which bore a longer vowel sound in most Old Norman French. An unusually strong similarity exists in phonetics with the term's Latin root mōns, montes (genitive).) and large hill are cognate. The origin is as a description of a place in France. This came across due to a noble style of at least 1071 Lord of (seigneur de) Richmond/t, associated with the Harrying of the North and thus Richmond, North Yorkshire. This settled into the title of Earl of Richmond briefly in its history borne by Henry VII of England. It was popularised from his local development of Richmond Palace to replace Shene Palace, precisely as the manor name had already changed and parish name would change. The associated settlement took the same name; for some years the two names were often used in conjunction (for example, "Shene otherwise called Richemount").

== Topography ==
The straight southwest slope is steepest, falling away to Petersham meadows by the Thames and is a backdrop to Kingston and Richmond Bridges. Other returns to the flood plain are more complex across and beyond the park due to semi-natural ponds and dry and wet running vales feeding an easterly draining brook. The park has further upland – Wimbledon Common and Putney Heath – beyond. On, and gently scaling the steep fluvial terrace, is residential street Richmond Hill. (Note: Classed as the B321) It is built up only on its higher (northeast) side – from the Richmond Bridge corner of the town centre to the hilltop fronted by a cinema, homes, eateries and hotel-restaurants. It is one-way along its bulk.

== History ==
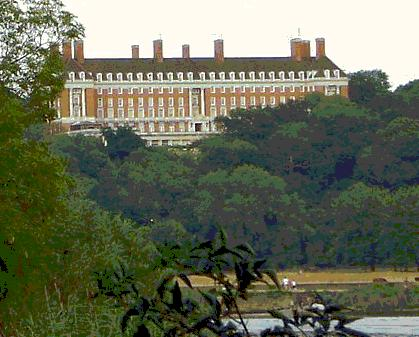
The former Royal Star and Garter Home for disabled ex-servicemen on Richmond Hill

As the town of Richmond developed from its founding in the early 16th century, after Henry VII had established Richmond Palace, the attributes of the hill naturally attracted desirable residential and commercial development – with the result that many large, ornate properties came and went on the hill over the centuries, some of them with famous or notable persons as owners or occupiers. Newer waves and subdivisions of these have continued, subject to external stylistic conformity. This three-times extended conservation area is "almost entirely surrounded" by others.

The original homes on Richmond Hill were set back in what is now The Vineyard, including Clarence House, Halford House, Michel's Almshouses and Vineyard House.

=== Terrace Walk and Terrace and Buccleuch Gardens ===
A Terrace Walk was laid out near the top of the hill in the 18th century to offer views of the scenic panorama. The promenade surmounts the Terrace and Buccleuch Gardens and both are listed in Historic England's Register of Parks and Gardens of Special Historic Interest in England, the Walk at Grade II* and Terrace and Buccleuch Gardens, at Grade II.

== Legally-protected vistas ==
The hill offers the only view in England to be protected by an Act of Parliament—the Richmond, Ham and Petersham Open Spaces Act passed in 1902—to protect the land on and below it and thus preserve the fine views to the west and south. Two years before the wooded isle centrepiece of the view, Glover's Island (also known as Clam Island), was bought by a local resident and given to the Richmond Corporation (Borough) in return for the latter noting against its records that it and its successors would not develop the isle.

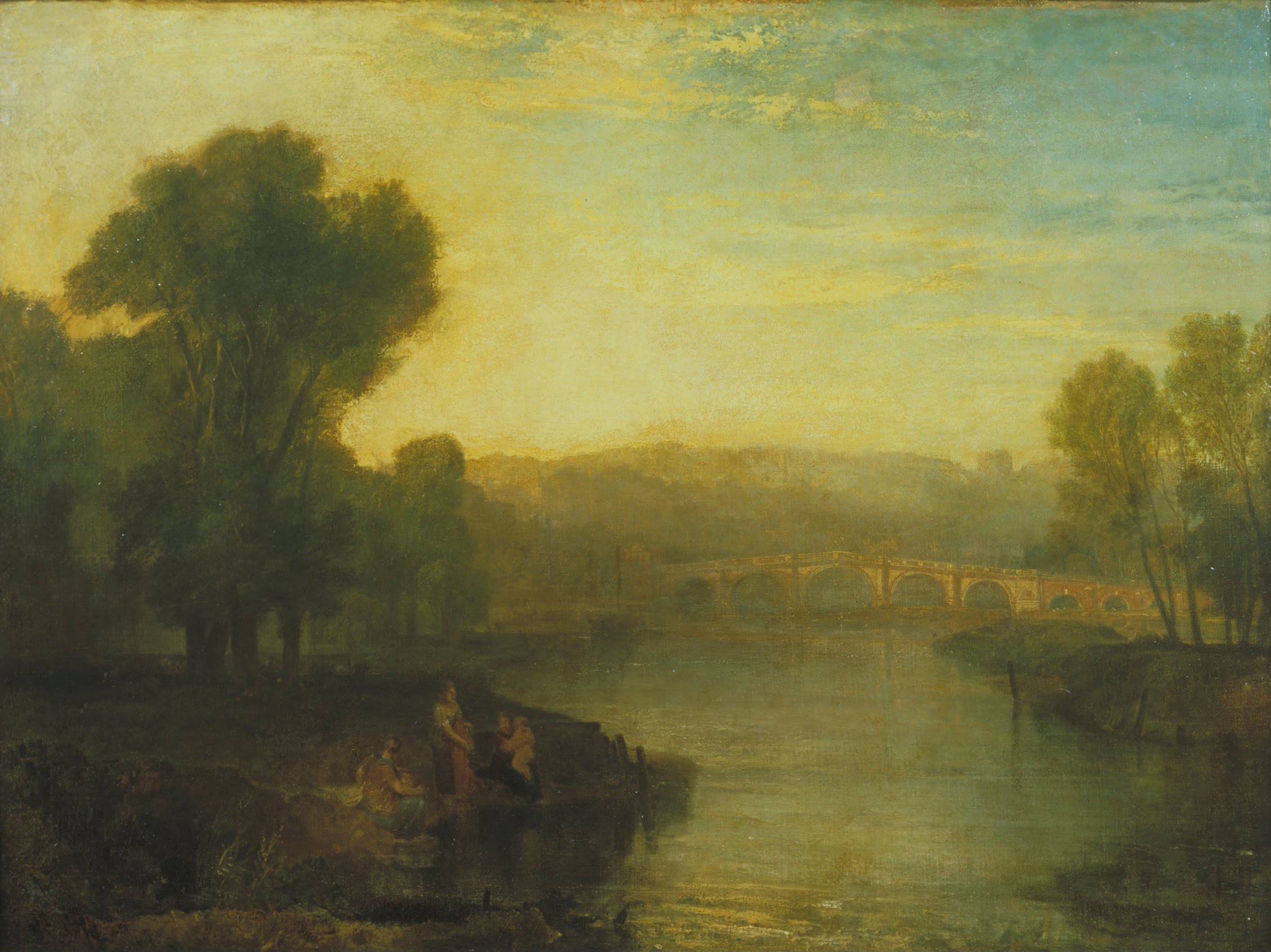
View of Richmond Hill and Bridge by J. M. W. Turner, 1808.

Immortalised in paintings by John Wootton, Sir Joshua Reynolds and J. M. W. Turner (notably Thomson's Aeolian Harp), it was described by Sir Walter Scott as "an unrivalled landscape". It was this view that inspired the name of Richmond, Virginia, after the colonial founder of the city, William Byrd II, noticed a curve in the James River that remarkably resembled this meander.
