= Louis Honig =

German-born English composer and pianist (1849–1906)

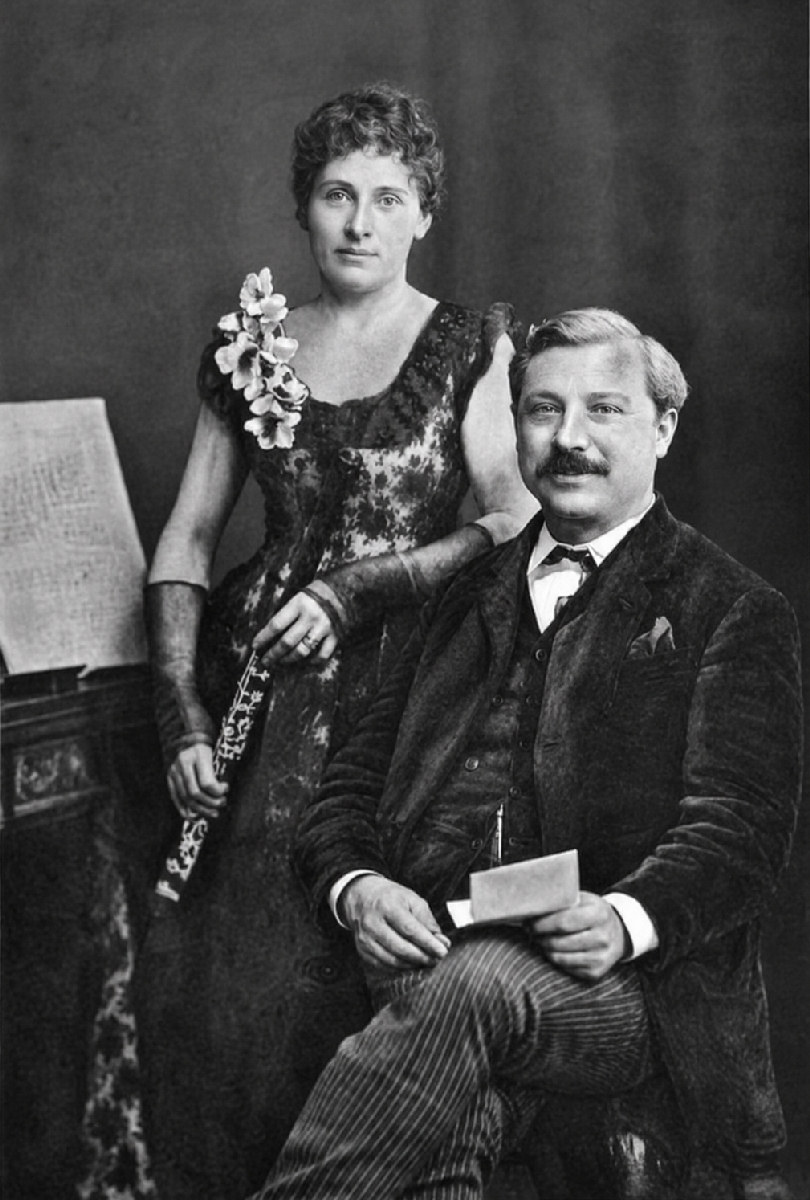
- Louis and Hannah Honig, 1889
- Born: 26 March 1849; Nieder-Ohmen, Grand Duchy of Hesse, German Empire
- Died: 17 March 1906 (aged 56); Richmond, Surrey, UKGBI
- Resting place: Richmond Old Cemetery
- Occupations: Composer; pianist; professor
- Spouses: Charlotte Cutler (m. 1853; died 1874); Louisa Margaretta Schmidt (m. 1875; died 1885); Annie Grace Fladgate (m. 1885; died 1887); Hannah Rosetta Dinah Parks (m. 1889)
- Children: 14

Louis Honig (26 March 1849 – 17 March 1906) was a composer, pianist, and Professor of Music at his Academy of Music in the East End of London.

== Life ==
Honig was born on 26 March 1849 in Nieder-Ohmen, Grand Duchy of Hesse. His father was Johannes Honig (1811–1878).

By the 1860s the family were living at White Hart Court, Greenfield Street, Commercial Road. Louis was already performing on the piano. By the 1870s he was advertising as a music teacher and held annual concerts at the Bow and Bromley Institute from about 1865. In 1869 he was recorded giving music lessons at 183, Cannon Street-road; in 1870 he was organist of St. Matthew's Church, Princes Square, and organist and choirmaster of St Benet's, Mile End Road. He adapted music for the London Gaelic Choir, and in 1880 he was musical director of the Eastern District Post Office Brass Band of Bow. He described himself as a 'Professor of Music' with his Musical Academy established 1865 at 7 Bromley Street, Stepney. By the 1881 Census the family were living at 725, Commercial Road, Limehouse, Stepney. A report on one of his Bow and Bromley concerts in 1882 noted how as "a youth of about 16 years of age, began to be talked of as a dashing pianist and a good singer" and "how rapidly he became teacher, organist, choirmaster, composer, musical director and master of all sorts of musical classes and societies", from "the local Town Hall to the Great St. James's Hall". In 1893 he reported that he had "instructed 1,750 pupils and brought forward 500 of them at his concerts."

He was a member of the Freemasons, composing and performing music for them. He was installed as the Worshipful Master of the Lodge of Asaph (for members of the musical and theatrical professions) in 1902 at Freemasons’ Hall.

He published about ninety musical publications. In 1882 he composed the music for the comic opera 'The Postillion of Bath'. In 1887 he adapted a German comedy play by Von Moser called 'The Quack' for the Royalty Theatre. In 1893 he composed the music for the operetta 'The King's Command' which toured the country as well as London, and another of his comic operettas, 'Katawompos', toured the provinces in 1896. According to the Thames Valley Times "His ballad, 'Loved Richmond' was much appreciated by the Princess of Wales" when he sent a copy to White Lodge. According to the composer it sold ‘many thousands of copies’. The Era later noted that he had`; ‘written other songs which have been popular, but Loved Richmond will probably take the lead, the subject bring universally admired.’ It was included on the CD An Arcadian Miscellany (2002) produced by The Thames Landscape Strategy.

He was musical director to the Theatre Royal, Richmond, which had opened in 1890.

From about 1883 the family lived at Waterford Lodge, 40 Queens Road, Richmond. On the 1891 Census they were living at 70 Church Road, Richmond.

His children were also musicians: Lily and Marguerite toured with Madame Levante's Orchestra of Ladies, Carl (Charles), performed with his parents at the Royal Aquarium in 1892. Lily, Maggie and Louis Jr were reported returning from eight months' tour of Sweden and Norway in 1899. Louisa and Adelaide also performed. His nephew was the musician Victor Opfermann.

== Selected works ==
Title	Publisher	Date	Note
The Postillion of Bath. An original ... Comic Opera. In Two Acts.	London : J. Williams	1870?	
Loved Richmond. : Ballad	London : Honig Munovelad Co.	1895	
Many joyous returns of the day: ... Song	London, Honig Munovelad	1914	
The Kings's command: an original operetta	London, Keith, Prowse	1900	
Kiddies and flow'rs	London, British Munovelad Co	1914	
Grand fantasia on a German theme, Take me across: barcarolle	London, Rudall Carte & Co.	1890	
A Tribute to the Coronation. [Songs and P.F. pieces.]	Richmond Hill, Surrey : Louis Honig	1902	
Echoes of Caledonia for piano (sheet music)		1910	

== Personal life ==
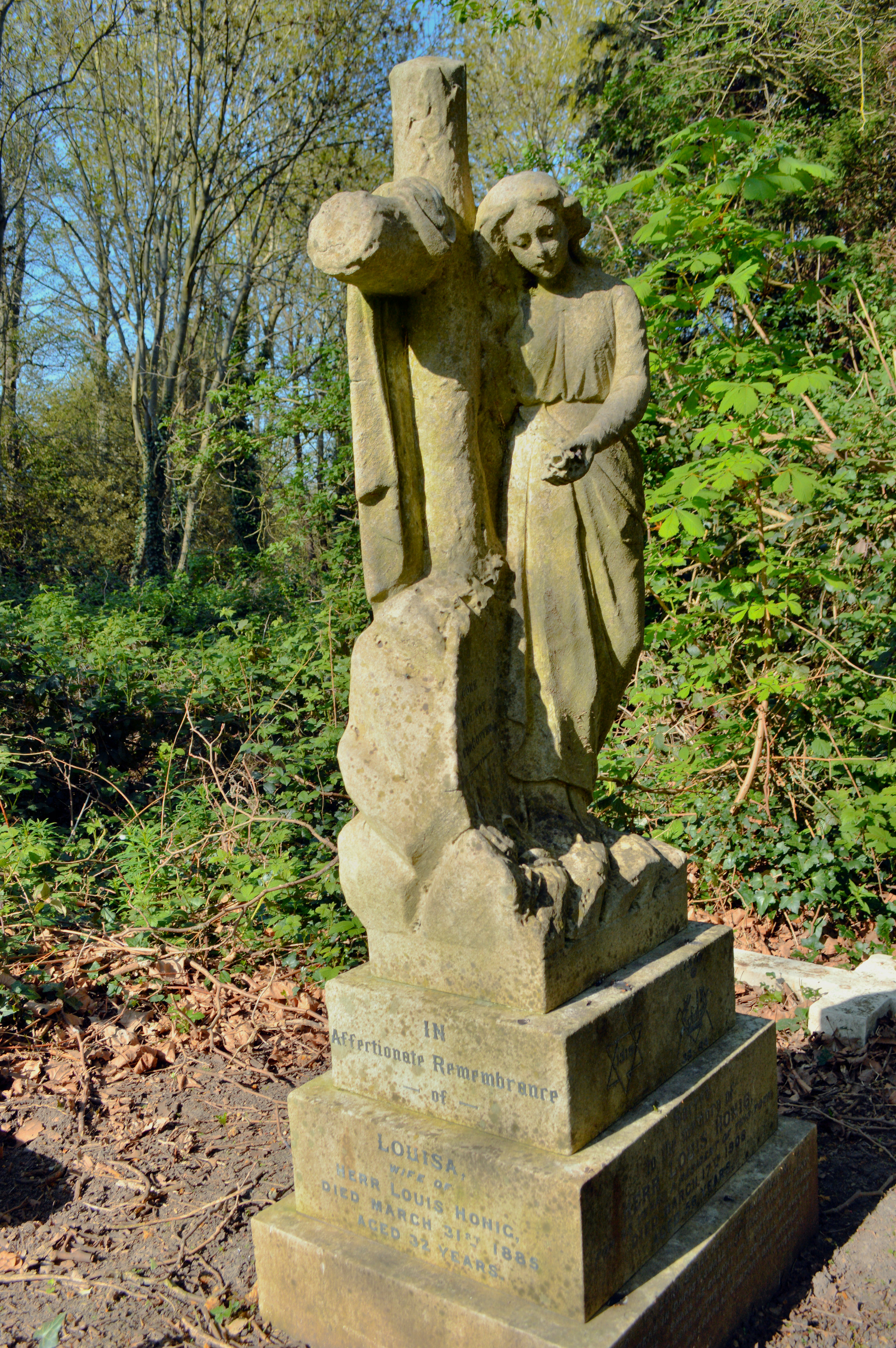
Memorial in Richmond Old Cemetery

On 8 May 1870 he married Charlotte Cutler (b 1853) in Emmanuel Church, Forest Gate, Essex. She died in 1874. Their children were Louise (b 1871), and Adelaide Henrietta (b 1872) both born in Ratcliff.

On 14 February 1875 he married Louisa Margaretta Schmidt (b 13 April 1853, Offenbach am Main, Hessen, Germany) in St George's German Lutheran Church Whitechapel, London. She died on 31 March 1885 of consumption. They had 8 children: Pauline (1875–1876), Louis John (1876–1926), Charles (b 1878), Caroline/Lilly (b 1880), Katherine (1882–1883), Margaretta (b 1882), Elizabeth (b & d 1884) and Philip (1884–1885).

On 5 December 1885 he married Annie Grace Fladgate at St. Mary's Church, Walthamstow. She died following childbirth on 2 November 1887 at Waterford Lodge, Richmond Hill. They had two children: Max Lynton (1886–1974) and Grace Lucy (b 1887).

His fourth marriage on 14 January 1889 was to Hannah Rosetta Dinah Parks (b 1860, Clerkenwell, London), held at St John the Divine, Richmond. She was a virtuoso flautist known as the 'Queen of Flute Players' who worked mainly in theatres using the name 'Cora Cardigan'. She performed throughout Europe and the United States, and was known for her skill playing the flute, piccolo and violin. Their daughters were Pauline (1889–1982) and Lucy (1891–1892).

He died on 17 March 1906 at his home Waterford Lodge, Queens Road, Richmond, of influenza and meningitis. He is buried in Richmond Old Cemetery along with his wife Louisa, his mother Elizabeth, and four infant children. Three Masonic Lodges were represented at his funeral as well as three bandsmen of the 1st Life Guards, where his son Carl was a trumpeter.
