= Fred Viner =

English watercolour artist (1858–1940)

Frederick Viner (5 March 1858 – 17 August 1940) was an English watercolour artist.

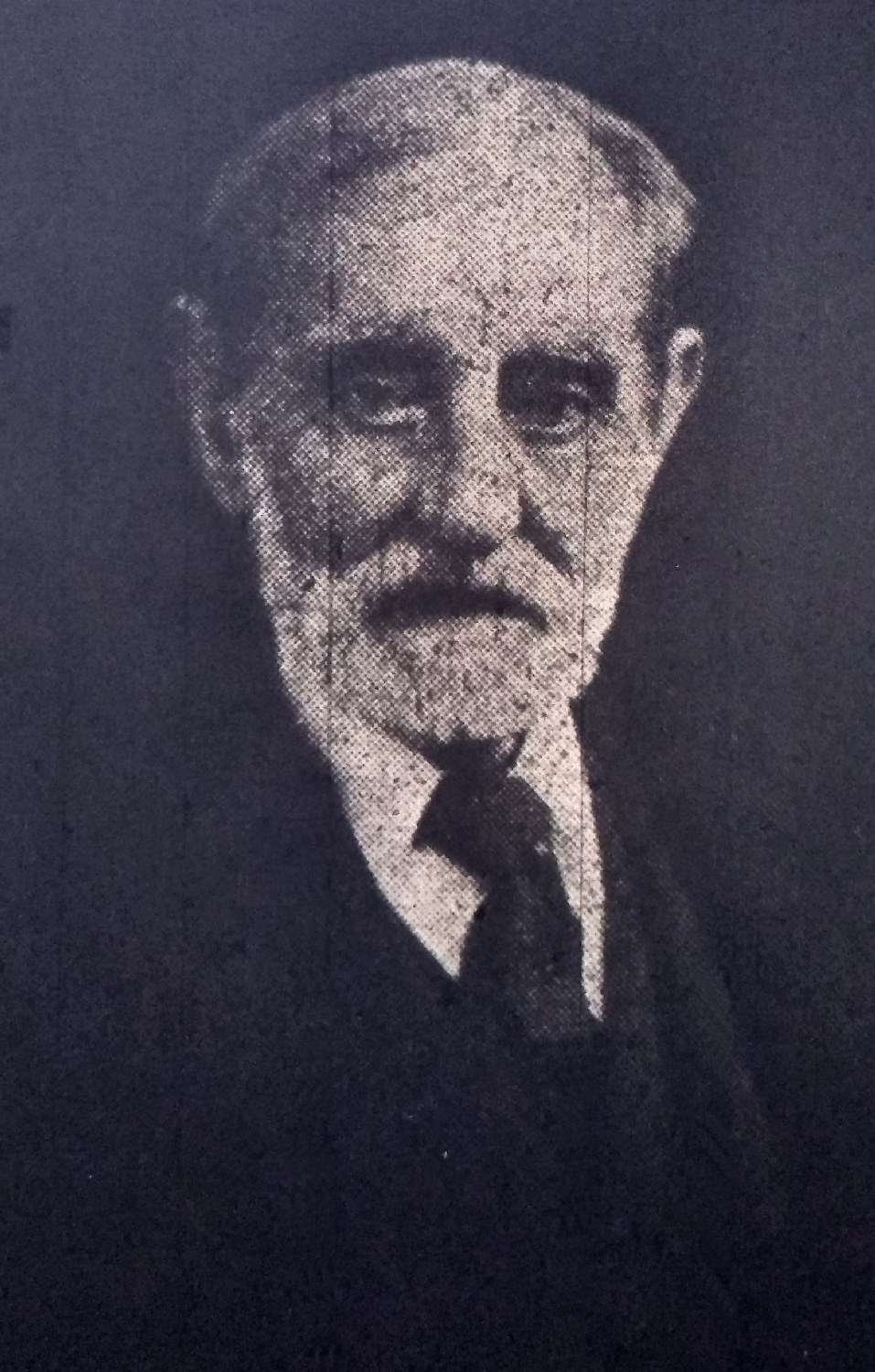
Richmond Herald 1940

Frederick Viner, known as Fred, and his twin brother Alfred, were born at Gardener's Lodge, Sheen Mount, East Sheen, sons of William Viner and Jane Whiting; their father was gardener to Mr Henry Porter Smith. Their mother died shortly after their births. He was educated at Mortlake Schools.

From 1873 when aged 15 he was a seaman and in 1876 aged 18 he signed up for ten years service in the Royal Navy but was discharged in 1878 for bad and objectionable behaviour. He continued as a mariner and later recorded making several crossings of the Atlantic. This would be when he took up painting seascapes to fill his leisure time during long voyages and earn extra income. On the 1881 Census he is recorded in Canterbury Prison as a mariner serving 15 months 'hard labour' for housebreaking. He served another period in prison in 1883, this time giving his occupation as artist.

In 1899 he returned to live in Richmond and at the time of the 1901 Census was living in Sheen Road. He made his living as a watercolour artist painting local scenes, mostly of Richmond, Kew and Isleworth, but also seascapes and other locations. His paintings are signed F.Viner. He had a studio on the Quadrant set up for him by the father of the Registrar, Thomas Day.

During World War I he was at Aldershot doing war work. He then lived at the Grove Road Institution, Richmond, later renamed the Richmond Institution; he exhibited watercolours of 'peaceful scenes of the countryside' and rugs at the Brabazon Society annual exhibitions and sales. He was recorded as an inmate on the 1939 Register giving his former occupation as 'scene painter', died there in 1940 and is buried in Richmond Cemetery.

Thirty-six of his paintings are in the Richmond Borough Art Collection at Orleans House, ten in the Richmond Local Studies collection and in the Hounslow archives.
