= Clarence House, Richmond =

Coordinates: 51.4578°N 0.3033°W

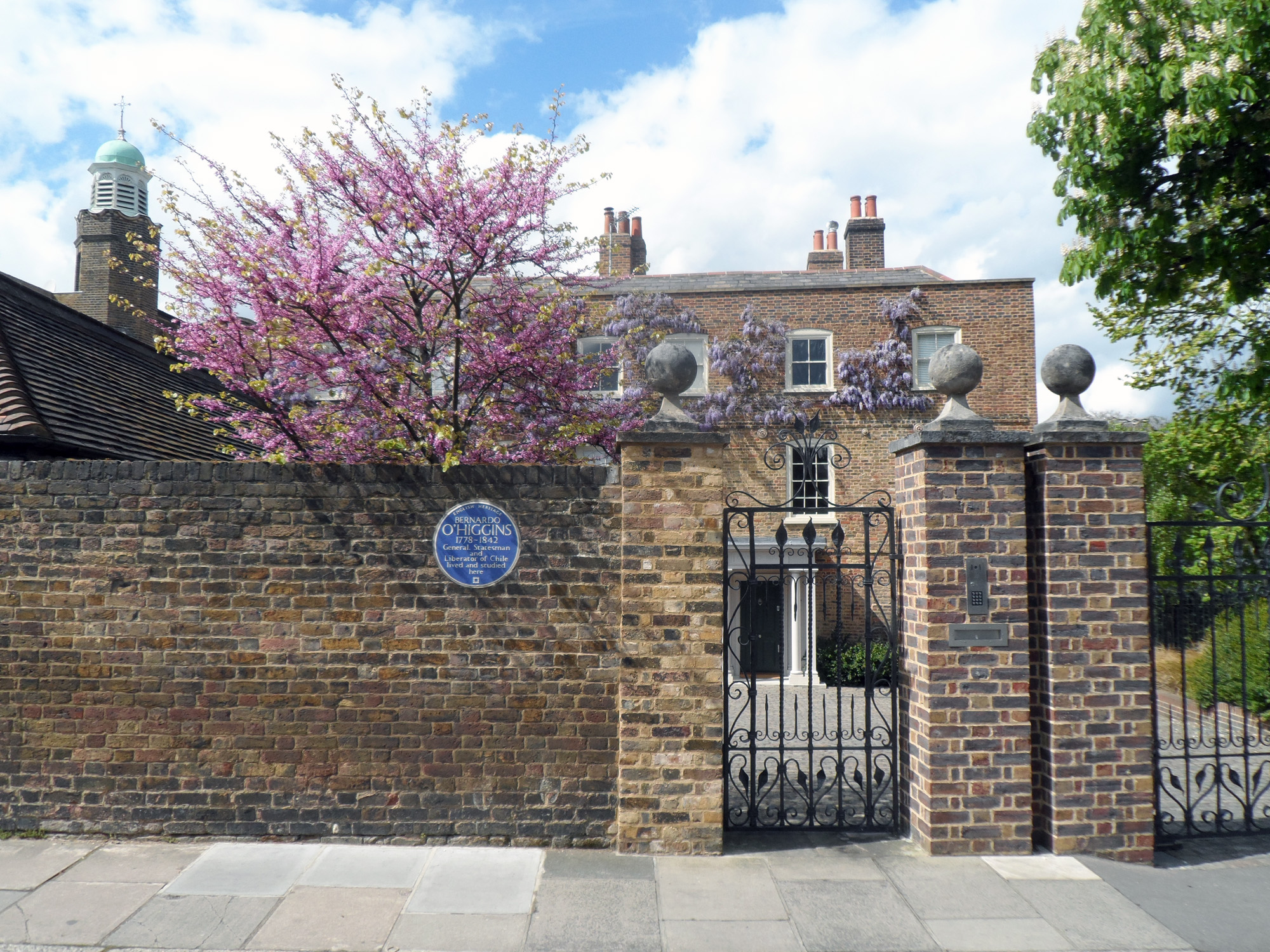
- Exterior of Clarence House showing the Bernardo O'Higgins blue plaque
- Interactive map of the Clarence House, Richmond area

General information
- Type: Residential
- Location: The Vineyard, Richmond, London

Listed Building – Grade II
- Official name: Clarence House
- Designated: 2 June 1964
- Reference no.: 1253023

Clarence House, Richmond is a Grade II listed house in The Vineyard, Richmond, dating from about 1696.

It was built for Nathaniel Rawlins, a London haberdasher merchant, who lived there until his death in 1718. The Duke of Clarence, later to become King William IV, lived in Richmond in the late 1780s and gave his name to the property. From 1792 to 1799, Clarence House was a Catholic school run by Timothy Eeles. Among the students was Bernardo O'Higgins. O'Higgins is commemorated on the wall of the property with a blue plaque installed by English Heritage, for his role in the Chilean War of Independence. (Note: The plaque, installed in July 1994, reads: "Bernardo O'Higgins, 1778–1842, General, Statesman and Liberator of Chile, lived and studied here". "Blue plaques". Visit Richmond. London Borough of Richmond upon Thames.)

The building was used as a warehouse by Fortnum & Mason from 1941 to 1947. They had planned in 1943 to tear the building down and replace it with a commercial development.

A private dwelling since 1947, it was owned by the actor Brian Blessed from 1967 to 1976. In 2012 the house was offered for sale, with an asking price of £22.5m. This was reduced to £18 million, and eventually to £14.5 million in 2013.
