= The Vineyard, Richmond =

Street in Richmond, London

Coordinates: 51°27′29.52″N 0°18′6.52″W

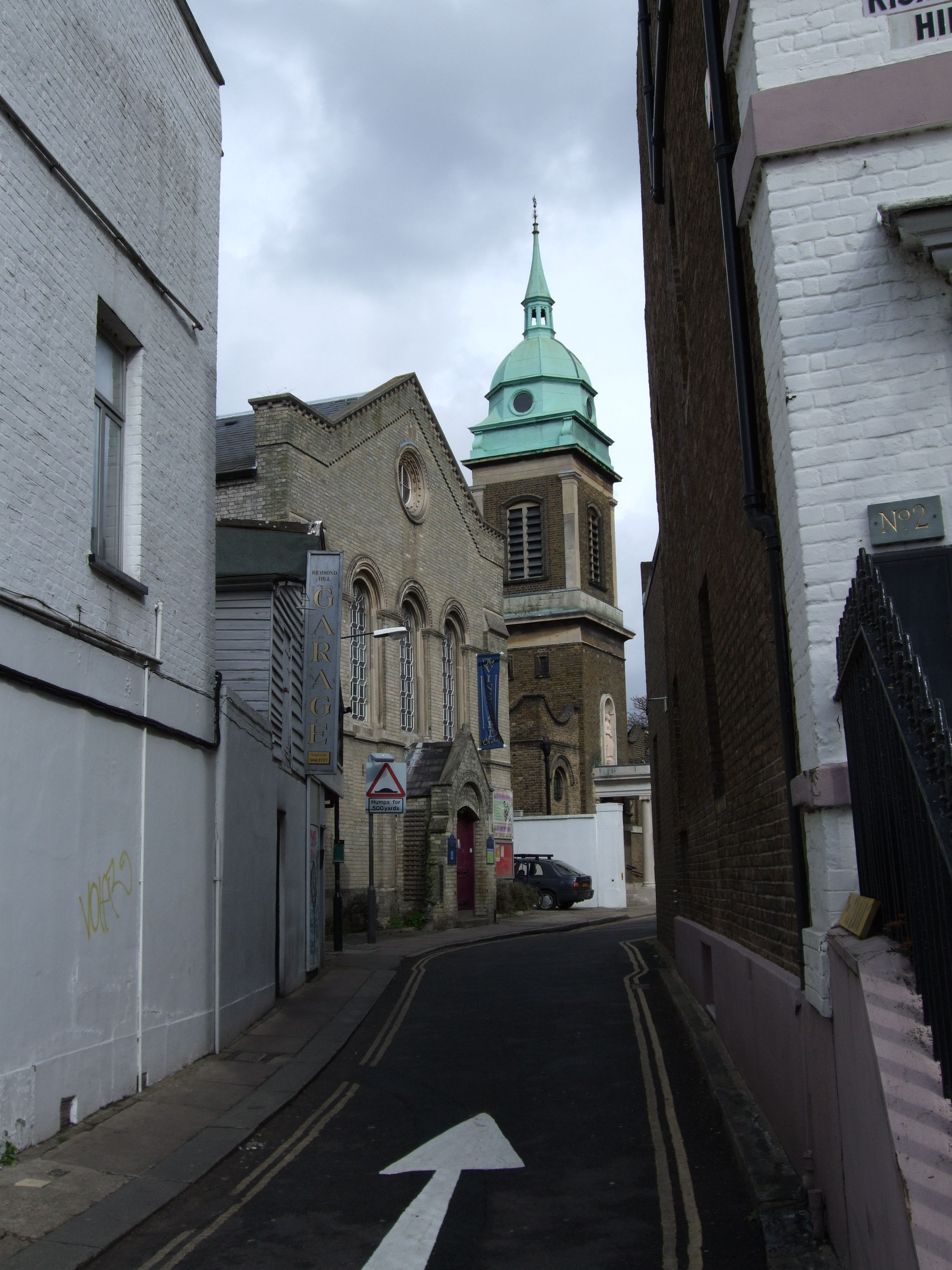
The Vineyard

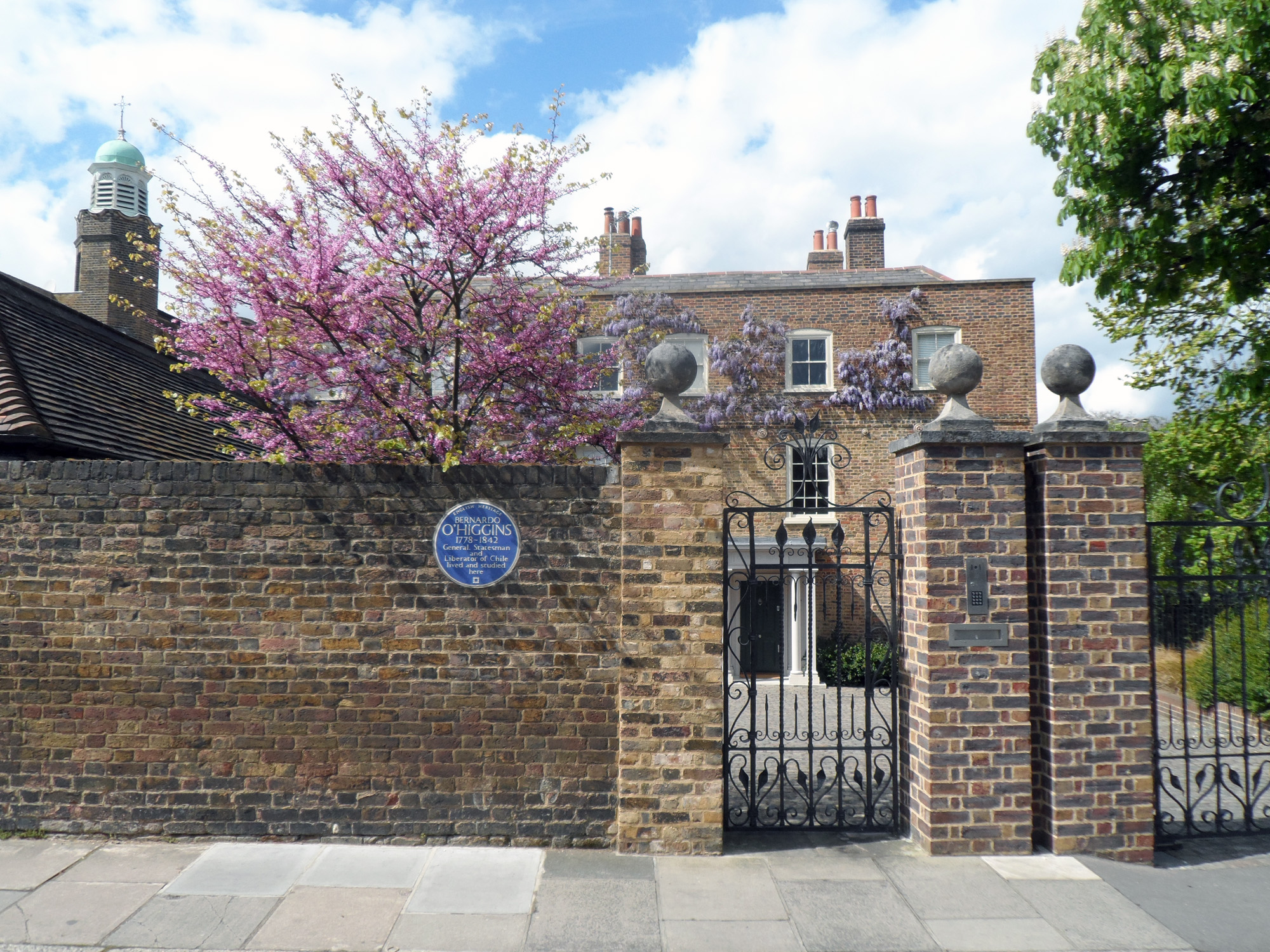
Exterior of Clarence House showing the Bernardo O'Higgins blue plaque

The Vineyard is a street in Richmond, in the London Borough of Richmond upon Thames. It includes three groups of almshouses, a Grade II listed church (St Elizabeth of Portugal Church) and Clarence House, a 17th-century Grade II listed house associated with Bernardo O’Higgins, who is commemorated on the wall of the property with a blue plaque, installed by English Heritage, for his role in the Chilean War of Independence. (Note: The plaque, installed in July 1994, reads: "Bernardo O'Higgins, 1778–1842, General, Statesman and Liberator of Chile, lived and studied here".)
