= List of public art in the London Borough of Richmond upon Thames =

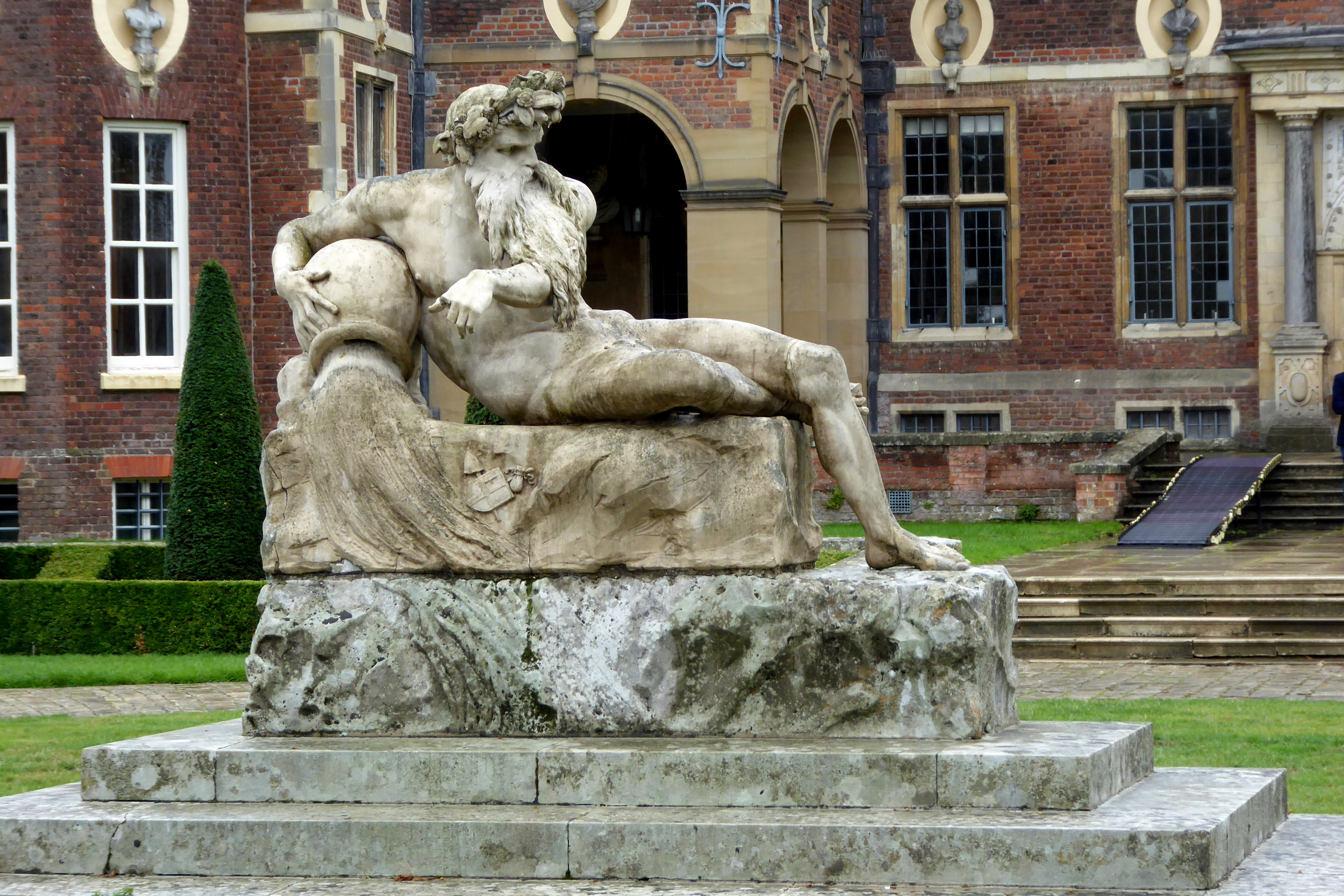
Father Thames (1775) by John Bacon the Elder, Ham House

This is a list of public art in the London Borough of Richmond upon Thames.

== Barnes ==
Image	Title / subject	Location and coordinates	Date	Artist / designer	Type	Designation	Notes
	Red lions	Outside Red Lion pub, Castelnau, Barnes 51.47548°N 0.23905°W	1830s		Sculptures	—N/a	
	Royal coat of arms of the United Kingdom, accompanied by the arms of the City of London, the City of Westminster (historic), Guildford, Kent, Middlesex (historic) and Colchester	On Hammersmith Bridge (part also in Hammersmith and Fulham) 51°29′15″N 0°13′52″W	1887	Joseph Bazalgette (architect)	Reliefs	Grade II	
	Dean Colet and Two Pupils	St Paul's School 51.48740°N 0.23832°W	1902	Hamo Thornycroft	Sculptural group	—N/a	Originally installed at the school's previous site in Hammersmith, the group was moved here in 1968.
More images	Barnes War Memorial	St Mary's churchyard 51.4748°N 0.2417°W	1921	?	Gabled cross	Grade II	Unveiled 19 June 1921.
More images	Memorial to Steve Fairbairn, a.k.a. Mile Post	Riverside at Barnes 51.47852°N 0.226987°W	1962		Obelisk	—N/a	
More images	Statue of Peter Scott	London Wetland Centre 51.47658°N 0.23565°W	2000	Nicola Godden	Statue	—N/a	
	Dragonfly sculpture	Roof of the meeting point at the WWT London Wetland Centre's Visitor Centre 51.47708°N 0.23575°W			Sculpture	—N/a	
	Peter Day memorial sculpture	London Wetland Centre			Sculpture	—N/a	
	Sundial Max Nicholson	London Wetland Centre	2004	Piers Nicholson	Stainless steel sundial	—N/a	
	Two hawks	Entrance to No. 9 The Terrace 51.472793°N 0.252096°W	19th century		Sculpture	Grade II	
More images	Marc Bolan's Rock Shrine Marc Bolan	Queens Ride 51.465979°N 0.238695°W	2002		Bust	—N/a	

== Bushy Park ==
Image	Title / subject	Location and coordinates	Date	Artist / designer	Type	Designation	Notes
More images	Diana Fountain	Great Basin, Chestnut Avenue 51.40992°N 0.33619°W	17th-century sculptures in an 18th-century setting	Hubert Le Sueur, Francesco Fanelli		Grade I	
	Canadian Totem Pole	Waterhouse Plantation 51°24′47.58″N 0°21′3.07″W	1992	Norman Tait		—N/a	
	Totem Bench	Waterhouse Plantation 51°24′45.27″N 0°21′1.69″W	1993	Katie Walker		—N/a	
	Supreme Headquarters Allied Expedition Force (SHAEF) Memorial	Near Chestnut Avenue 51.4183°N 0.3280°W	1994			—N/a	
	United States Army Air Force Memorial	Near Chestnut Avenue 51.4193°N 0.3291°W	1999			—N/a	
	Metal sculpture on the Cascade	Bushy Park Water Gardens	2008	Ian Gill		—N/a	

== Ham and Petersham ==
Image	Title / subject	Location and coordinates	Date	Artist / designer	Type	Designation	Notes
More images	Father Thames	Ham House 51.44448°N 0.31433°W	1775	John Bacon	Sculpture	Grade II	
	Dysart coat of arms	Gatehouse off Petersham Road, Petersham, near Tree Close 51.445103°N 0.303422°W	c. 1900		Relief	Grade II	
	Ham War Memorial	St Andrew's churchyard 51.4332°N 0.3041°W	1920	?	Memorial cross	Grade II	
More images	Petersham War Memorial	Near St Peter's Church 51.446845°N 0.301375°W	1920	?	Memorial cross	Grade II	Unveiled 26 November 1920.
More images	All Saints' Church, Petersham	Bute Avenue	1901–1909	John Kelly	Statues and reliefs	Grade II	
	Saint George and the Dragon	Meadlands Primary School, Broughton Avenue	1952		Relief		
	Pastorale	Parkleys Estate, Ham Parade	1956	Keith Godwin	Sculpture		
	Queen's Platinum Jubilee plaque	Petersham Road, near Tree Close 51.445278°N 0.303186°W	2022 (originally Queen's Silver Jubilee and Queen's Diamond Jubilee plaque; altered 2012 for her Diamond Jubilee)				
	Ashburnham Road Community Mosaic	Junction of Ashburnham Road and Back Lane, Ham 51.43789°N 0.31398°W	2005	Howard Grange, Miriam Zadik Gold, local residents	Mosaic		
	Ham Village Green Community Mosaic Project		2014	Julia van den Bosch and Kim Porrelli, Save the World Club	Mosaic		
	Ham Village Sign	Gate House Garden, Ham Parade	2021	Diana Burnard (of Village Signs), designed by Jim Andrews			

== Hampton and Hampton Hill ==
Image	Title / subject	Location and coordinates	Date	Artist / designer	Type	Designation	Notes
More images	Monument to William Roy	Roy Grove, Hampton 51.42621°N 0.36571°W	1791	William Mudge	Cannon (repurposed)	Grade II	Marks the south-eastern end of the baseline measured by General Roy in 1784 which is considered to be the origin of the Ordnance Survey. Its counterpart to the north-west is at Heathrow Airport.
	Insignia of the 8th Battalion of the Middlesex Regiment	Over door of 15 High Street, Hampton Hill 51.42282°N 0.35888°W	1914				
More images	Hampton Hill War Memorial	St James's churchyard 51.4299°N 0.3607°W	1920	P. M. Andrews	Memorial cross	Grade II	Unveiled 26 May 1920.
	Tagg's Island Sundial	Hampton Court Road, near Tagg's Island 51.40987°N 0.35171°W	1999	David Harber			
	Mural	Hampton Youth Project 51.42581°N 0.37745°W	Extended in 2012	Tom Ryall (extension)			
	Gates, railings and an entrance piece	Tangley Park Family Centre, Bramble Lane, Hampton 51°25′32.29″N 0°22′40.49″W	2013	Helena Roden (artist), Gideon Petersen (blacksmith)			

== Hampton Court Palace ==
Image	Title / subject	Location and coordinates	Date	Artist / designer	Type	Designation	Notes
	Coat of arms of Cardinal Thomas Wolsey	On east side of Anne Boleyn Gatehouse, over doorway 51.403425°N 0.33803°W	c. 1521		Relief	Grade I	
More images	Astronomical clock	On east side of Anne Boleyn Gatehouse 51.403425°N 0.33803°W	1540	Nicholas Kratzer and Nicholas Oursian	Astronomical clock	Grade I	
More images	The Three Graces	Fountain Garden, at east end 51.402874°N 0.33379°W	After a 16th-century original	After Germain Pilon and Domenico del Barbiere	Sculpture	Grade II*	A copy (of uncertain date) of the funerary monument for the heart of Henry II of France, now in the Louvre.
	Hercules	South side of palace, facing Privy Garden 51.402786°N 0.33721°W	17th century				
	Roman soldier	South side of palace, facing Privy Garden 51.402786°N 0.33707°W	17th century				
	Privy Garden statues	Privy Garden 51.401097°N 0.33762°W	17th century				
	Sundial	Privy Garden (at north end) 51.402647°N 0.33722°W	c. 1680	Thomas Tompion	Sundial	Grade I	
	Hercules Triumphing over Envy	East Front	c. 1695–1696	Caius Gabriel Cibber	Tympanum relief	Grade I	
More images	Flower Pot Gate	Hampton Court Road, north of Hampton Court 51.406361°N 0.335392°W	1699–1700	John Nost		Grade I	
More images	Lion Gate	Hampton Court Road, north of Hampton Court 51.406341°N 0.337118°W	18th century	Christopher Wren (architect)		Grade I	
More images	Screen	South end of Privy Garden, facing River Thames 51.400877°N 0.33762°W	1701	Jean Tijou	Screen	Grade I	
	Lion of England	Trophy Gate 51.404526°N 0.34140°W	1708	Grinling Gibbons and John Oliver	Sculpture	Grade I	
	Unicorn of Scotland	Trophy Gate 51.404506°N 0.34144°W	1708	Grinling Gibbons and John Oliver	Sculpture		
	Trophies of arms	Trophy Gate 51.404486°N 0.34148°W	1708	Grinling Gibbons and John Oliver	Sculpture		
	Adonis	Rose Garden	1869	Robert Jackson	Statue	Grade II	Moved to this site from the Privy Garden in 1995.
	Flora	Rose Garden	1869	Robert Jackson	Statue	Grade II	Moved to this site from the Privy Garden in 1995.
	Abundance	Rose Garden	c. 1906	Francis Derwent Wood	Sculpture	—N/a	
	King's Beasts	Tudor Garden, Chapel Court 51.403658°N 0.33678°W	2009	Todd Longstaffe-Gowan (landscape architect)			

=== The King's Beasts ===
Image	Title / subject	Location and coordinates	Date	Artist / designer	Type	Designation	Notes
More images	Lion of England	North side of Moat Bridge 51.403622°N 0.33927°W	1911		Sculpture		
More images	Seymour Panther	North side of Moat Bridge 51.403605°N 0.33927°W	1911		Sculpture		
More images	Greyhound of Richmond	North side of Moat Bridge 51.403583°N 0.33920°W	1911		Sculpture		
More images	Yale of Beaufort	North side of Moat Bridge 51.403578°N 0.33909°W	1911		Sculpture		
More images	Tudor Dragon	North side of Moat Bridge 51.403572°N 0.33904°W	1911		Sculpture		
	Queen's Panther	South side of Moat Bridge 51.403508°N 0.33904°W	1911		Sculpture		
	Bull of Clarence	South side of Moat Bridge 51.403510°N 0.33911°W	1911		Sculpture		
	Queen's Lion	South side of Moat Bridge 51.403520°N 0.33921°W	1911		Sculpture		
More images	Royal Dragon	South side of Moat Bridge 51.403527°N 0.33926°W	1911		Sculpture		
More images	Seymour Unicorn	South side of Moat Bridge 51.403514°N 0.33929°W	1911		Sculpture		

=== Terracotta roundels ===
Image	Title / subject	Location and coordinates	Date	Artist / designer	Type	Designation	Notes
	Tiberius	Main gatehouse 51.403598°N 0.33900°W	1521	Giovanni da Maiano	Roundel	Grade I	
	Nero	Main gatehouse 51.403376°N 0.33904°W	1521	Giovanni da Maiano	Roundel	Grade I	
	Trajan	Anne Boleyn's Gatehouse, west side 51.403494°N 0.33816°W	1521	Giovanni da Maiano	Roundel	Grade I	
	Hadrian	Anne Boleyn's Gatehouse, west side 51.403399°N 0.33819°W	1521	Giovanni da Maiano	Roundel	Grade I	
	Vitellius	Anne Boleyn's Gatehouse, east side 51.403398°N 0.33804°W	1521	Giovanni da Maiano	Roundel	Grade I	
	Augustus	Anne Boleyn's Gatehouse, east side 51.403461°N 0.33803°W	1521	Giovanni da Maiano	Roundel	Grade I	
	Titus	George II Gateway 51.403411°N 0.33765°W	1521	Giovanni da Maiano	Roundel	Grade I	
	Otho	George II Gateway 51.403411°N 0.33765°W	1521	Giovanni da Maiano	Roundel	Grade I	
	Galba	George II Gateway 51.403341°N 0.33767°W	1521	Giovanni da Maiano	Roundel	Grade I	
	Julius Caesar	George II Gateway 51.403341°N 0.33767°W	1521	Giovanni da Maiano	Roundel	Grade I	

== Hampton Wick ==
Image	Title / subject	Location and coordinates	Date	Artist / designer	Type	Designation	Notes
More images	Hampton Wick War Memorial	Hampton Wick Roundabout 51.4112°N 0.3113°W	1921	?	Memorial cross	Grade II	
	Sculpture	Hampton Wick Riverside		?	sculpture		

== Kew ==
Image	Title / subject	Location and coordinates	Date	Artist / designer	Type	Designation	Notes
	Leda and the Swan	Over door of Adam House, 352 Kew Road 51.48224°N 0.28701°W	c. 1750		Relief	Grade II*	
	Royal Arms (Queen Victoria's Diamond Jubilee memorial)	On 22 Gloucester Road (the former parish hall of St Anne's Church) 51.48284°N 0.28501°W	1897		Relief		
	Coat of arms of Surrey	Kew Bridge (see also under Hounslow) 51.48676°N 0.28735°W	1903	John Wolfe Barry and Cuthbert Arthur Brereton	Relief	Grade II	
More images	Kew War Memorial	On Kew Green, next to St Anne's Church 51.48345°N 0.28751°W	1921	?	Memorial cross	Grade II	Unveiled 25 June 1921.
	Gates and railings	The National Archives	c. 1990–1995	Alan Evans	Gates and railings	—N/a	Based on medieval tally sticks, an early form of accounting.
	Cayho	Kew Pier	2000	Mark Folds	Sculpture	—N/a	
More images	There Be Monsters	Outside The National Archives 51.480995°N 0.280046°W	2004–2005	Workshop & Company	Mosaic globe sculpture	—N/a	
	Abstract sculpture to represent formal letter mail and a file cabinet.	Emerald Gardens, Bessant Drive		David Harber	Metal sculpture	—N/a	
	Abstract sculpture representing upside down pen nibs	Emerald Gardens, Bessant Drive		David Harber	Metal sculpture	—N/a	
	Mosaic Gardens	Windham Croft Centre for Children, 16 Windham Road	2012	Martin Cheek and many schools		—N/a	
	Miss Prism	Kew Riverside		William Pye	Water-powered kinetic sculpture	—N/a	
	Eccentric Empress	Kew Riverside	2018	Danny Lane	Glass sculpture	—N/a	
	Sundial	Kew Riverside, Melliss Avenue			Sculpture	—N/a	
	Parabolic Reflectors (Sound Mirrors)	Kew Riverside		Richter Spielgeräte	Steel-reinforced concrete	—N/a	
	White Light Passage	Kew Riverside	1999	John Gibbons	Stainless steel	—N/a	

=== Kew Gardens ===
Image	Title / subject	Location and coordinates	Date	Artist / designer	Type	Designation	Notes
	Chinese guardian lions	Facing pond, near Palm House 51.478955°N 0.290996°W	14th–18th century	?	Statues	—N/a	Possibly from the Ming period or later; similar to bronze examples in the Forbidden City. Given to the gardens by Sir John Ramsden in 1958.
More images	Flora	The Orangery	18th century				
	Five statues in a semicircle	Queen's Garden, behind Kew Palace 51.484272°N 0.295469°W	1734–1735				
	Shepherd	Temperate House	1760–1770	John Cheere	Statue		
	Shepherdess	Temperate House	1760–1770	John Cheere	Statue		
More images	David	Temperate House	19th century	After Donatello	Statue		
More images	Hercules and Achelous	In pond near Palm House 51.479435°N 0.290802°W	c. 1814	François Joseph Bosio	Sculptural group	Grade II	Purchased by George IV in 1829 through his goldsmiths Rundell, Bridge & Rundell, and placed in the grounds of Windsor Castle. Installed here in 1963, when it was adapted for use as a fountain.
More images	Medici Vase	North-east of Palm House	c. 1825		Vase	Grade II	
	Lion	Lion Gate, Kew Road 51.477112°N 0.291031°W	1845 (Coade stone lion statue 1821)	Thomas Hardwick		Grade II	
	Unicorn	Unicorn Gate, Kew Road 51.470601°N 0.293715°W	1845 (Coade stone unicorn statue 1821)	Thomas Hardwick		Grade II	
	Elizabeth Gate (formerly Main Gate)	Kew Green 51.484372°N 0.29130°W	1846	Decimus Burton		Grade II*	
	Cumberland Gate	Kew Road 51.480345°N 0.289043°W	1868	William Eden Nesfield		Grade II	
	Victoria Gate	Kew Road 51.477902°N 0.290780°W	1868	William Eden Nesfield		Grade II	
More images	Out in the Fields	Herb Garden 51.480545°N 0.289293°W	1879	Arthur George Atkinson	Sculpture	—N/a	
More images	The Sower	Near Princess of Wales Conservatory 51.482445°N 0.289279°W	1886	Hamo Thornycroft	Sculpture	Grade II	
	War memorial	Temple of Arethusa	1921	Robert Lorimer	Plaque	Grade II	Unveiled 25 May 1921.
	Sundial	Near Kew Palace 51.483037°N 0.294361°W	1959	Martin Holden (based on Thomas Tompion)	Sundial	Grade II	
More images	Boy with Dolphin	Queen's Garden, behind Kew Palace 51.484162°N 0.295349°W	c. 1959	After Andrea del Verrocchio	Fountain with sculpture	—N/a	
	Kew Mural	In the Visitors Centre at Victoria Gate 51.478012°N 0.290791°W	1988	Robert H. Games		—N/a	
	Seven Slate Towers	Secluded Garden 51.482505°N 0.291199°W	1995–1996	Dan Reuben Harvey and Heather Ackroyd	Sculpture	—N/a	
More images	A Maximis ad Minima		1998	Eduardo Paolozzi	Sculpture	—N/a	
	Bootstrap DNA	Near Jodrell Laboratory 51°28′55.8″N 0°17′20.8″W	2003	Charles Jencks/John Gibson	Sculpture	—N/a	
More images	Leaf Spirit	Woodland Garden	2018	Simon Gudgeon	Sculpture	—N/a	

==== The Queen's Beasts ====
Image	Title / subject	Location and coordinates	Date	Artist / designer	Type	Designation	Notes
	White Greyhound of Richmond	Outside Palm House 51.478607°N 0.292100°W	1956	James Woodford	Statue	—N/a	
	Yale of Beaufort	Outside Palm House 51.478707°N 0.292162°W	1956	James Woodford	Statue	—N/a	
	Red Dragon of Wales	Outside Palm House 51.478863°N 0.292246°W	1956	James Woodford	Statue	—N/a	
	White Horse of Hanover	Outside Palm House 51.478939°N 0.292316°W	1956	James Woodford	Statue	—N/a	
	Lion of England	Outside Palm House 51.479111°N 0.2924341°W	1956	James Woodford	Statue	—N/a	
	White Lion of Mortimer	Outside Palm House 51.479176°N 0.2924345°W	1956	James Woodford	Statue	—N/a	
	Unicorn of Scotland	Outside Palm House 51.479286°N 0.2924879°W	1956	James Woodford	Statue	—N/a	
	Griffin of Edward III	Outside Palm House 51.479429°N 0.2925289°W	1956	James Woodford	Statue	—N/a	
	Black Bull of Clarence	Outside Palm House 51.479559°N 0.292601°W	1956	James Woodford	Statue	—N/a	
	Falcon of the Plantagenets	Outside Palm House 51.479659°N 0.292684°W	1956	James Woodford	Statue	—N/a	

== Mortlake and East Sheen ==
Image	Title / subject	Location and coordinates	Date	Artist / designer	Type	Designation	Notes
	University Boat Race finishing stone	The Riverside, Mortlake	19th century				
More images	Mortlake and East Sheen War Memorial	Sheen Lane, at crossroads with Upper Richmond Road West, East Sheen 51.46452°N 0.266787°W	1925	Albert Myers	Obelisk	Grade II	
More images	The Angel of Death	East Sheen Cemetery	1922	Sydney March	Portland stone and bronze memorial	Grade II*	
	Mortlake Brewery War Memorial	Lower Richmond Road, Mortlake	1945; moved to present site c. 1959 after closure of original brewery				
	Stag relief	Outside the gates of the old Stag Brewery, Lower Richmond Road					Moved here about 1959 when Watney's Stag Brewery in Victoria was demolished.
	Mosaic marking Tim Berners-Lee's invention of the World Wide Web	Sheen Lane Centre, Sheen Lane, East Sheen 51.46562°N 0.267373°W	June 2013	Sue Edkins			
	Glass flowers	Mortlake Crematorium, Garden of Remembrance			Glass sculpture		

== Richmond ==
Image	Title / subject	Location and coordinates	Date	Artist / designer	Type	Designation	Notes
	Coat of arms of Henry VII	Gatehouse of the former Richmond Palace 51.461388°N 0.308809°W	Restored in the 20th century			Grade I	
	Father Thames or River God	Terrace Gardens 51.45306°N 0.30153°W	1775	John Bacon		Grade II	Coade stone statue, from the same cast as those at Ham House and Somerset House.
More images	Milestone obelisk	Richmond Bridge 51.45798°N 0.30583°W	c. 1777	?	Obelisk	Grade II	
	Drinking fountain	Richmond Green 51.460667°N 0.306416°W	Late 19th century		Drinking fountain	Grade II	Restored in 1977 to mark the Silver Jubilee of Elizabeth II.
	Christ with two angels	Over entrance to St Matthias Church 51.4567°N 0.2958°W	1857	George Gilbert Scott (architect)		Grade II	
	Two obelisks	Old Deer Park, beside the Thames near Richmond Lock 51.461591°N 0.314822°W	1874				
	Memorial to Barbara Hofland	Outside St Mary Magdalene, Richmond	1885	Edward William Wyon			
	Royal Arms of England (1399–1603)	Façade of Old Town Hall, now Museum of Richmond, by main entrance 51.45888°N 0.30659°W	1893				
	Coat of arms of the Municipal Borough of Richmond	Façade of Old Town Hall, now Museum of Richmond, by main entrance 51.45888°N 0.30659°W	1893				
	Euterpe	Over entrance to Richmond Theatre 51.46206°N 0.30381°W	1899	John Broad (for Doulton of Lambeth)	Architectural sculpture	Grade II*	
	Monument for prevention of cruelty to animals	Richmond Hill 51°27′2.41″N 0°17′48.44″W	1901	Thomas Edward Collcutt		Grade II	
	Calvary	East end of St John the Divine	1905	Richard Garbe			
	Badge of the Order of the Garter	Over main entrance to Royal Star and Garter Home, Richmond Hill 51.450488°N 0.296764°W	1919	Edwin Cooper		Grade II	
More images	War memorial	St Mary Magdalene's churchyard 51.4604°N 0.3039°W	1920	?	Eleanor cross	Grade II	
More images	Richmond War Memorial	End of Whittaker Avenue, Richmond 51.45866°N 0.30704°W	1921			Grade II	
More images	South African War Memorial	Richmond Cemetery, Grove Road	1921	Edwin Lutyens	Cenotaph	Grade II	
	Odeon Cinema	Hill Street	1930	Julian Leathart and W. R. Grainger		Grade II	
More images	Aphrodite	Terrace Gardens 51.45284°N 0.30243°W	1952	Alan Howes	Sculpture	—N/a	Donated to the borough in 1954, the work was initially extremely unpopular with local residents, who considered it obscene. Nicknamed "Bulbous Betty".
More images	Bust of Bernardo O'Higgins	O'Higgins Square, next to Richmond Bridge 51.45786°N 0.30583°W	1998	?	Bust	—N/a	
	Inscribed stonework to mark restoration of the gardens	Terrace Gardens	2009	Michael Jensen			
	Time and Tide...	Lower George Street, Richmond	2010	Tony McSweeney			
More images	Statue of Virginia Woolf	Richmond Riverside	2022	Laury Dizengremel	Seated statue on bench	—N/a	
	Mural commemorating twinning with Fontainebleau and Konstanz	Richmond Station	2025	Richmond Council’s graphics team			
	Royal coat of arms of the United Kingdom	Façade of 70 George Street (the town's former post office) 51.46028°N 0.30549°W					
	Coat of arms of the Municipal Borough of Richmond	Façade of 70 George Street (the town's former post office) 51.46028°N 0.30549°W					
	Bust of Henry VII	Richmond Lending Library					

== Teddington ==
Image	Title / subject	Location and coordinates	Date	Artist / designer	Type	Designation	Notes
	Jubilee fountain	Park Road 51.42526°N 0.33478°W	1887			—N/a	
	Memorial to Timothy Bennet	Sandy Lane 51°24′51.69″N 0°19′3.67″W	1900			Grade II	
	Diana of Versailles	Grove Gardens	c. 1910	Domenico Brucciani			
	Church Cross War Memorial	Church of Saints Peter and Paul, Church Road 51°25′34.51″N 0°20′10.39″W	After 1918		Memorial cross		
More images	Stanley School War Memorial	Stanley Primary School, Strathmore Road 51.4340°N 0.3462°W	1920	W. T. Curtis	Obelisk	Grade II	Unveiled 27 October 1920.
More images	Teddington War Memorial	Hampton Road, outside Teddington Memorial Hospital 51.42637°N 0.34065°W	1921	Francis William Doyle Jones	Cenotaph	Grade II	Unveiled 8 January 1921.
	Bust of Noël Coward	Teddington Library	1999	Avril Vellacott			
	27 paintings and sculptures	Teddington Health and Social Care Centre	2010	Christine Byron, Julian Das, Chuck Elliot, Sam Haynes, Andrew McRobb, Andràs Mészàros, Jane Porter, Salina Somalya, Peter Slight, Jill Storey, Anna Tikhomirova, Stefano Unterthiner, Duncan Usher, Katie Wall, John Walsom			
	32 paintings, graphic designs, photographs and prints	Teddington Memorial Hospital 51°25′35″N 0°20′26.42″W	2012	Christine Byron, Colin Campbell, Catherine Cartwright, Tessa Charles, Helen Dixon, John Glover, Jerry Harpur, Andrew McRobb, Tom Nowell, Jill Storey, Anna Tikhomirova			
	Poppies (First World War memorial)	High Street, near junction with Elmfield Avenue 51.42719°N 0.3337°W	2015	Camelia Botnar Foundation			

== Twickenham ==
Image	Title / subject	Location and coordinates	Date	Artist / designer	Type	Designation	Notes
	Redeeming The Time (sundial)	Dial House, Twickenham Riverside 51.44691°N 0.32447°W	1726	Thomas Twining			
	Eagle	Over entrance to Ryde House, East Twickenham 51.45604°N 0.30993°W	c. 1830			Grade II	
	Lion	Entrance to West Stand, Twickenham Stadium 51.45552°N 0.34304°W	1837	William F. Woodington for Coade & Sealy	Statue		
More images	The Naked Ladies	York House gardens 51°26′48.30″N 0°19′26.50″W	Late 19th-century sculptures in an early 20th-century setting	Oscar Spalmach		Grade II	
	The Birth of Venus	The Japanese garden, York House	Early 20th century				
	Science, Literature and Art	Twickenham Library	1906	Gilbert Seale		Grade II	
	Alfred, Lord Tennyson	Twickenham Library	1906		Roundel	Grade II	
	Alexander Pope	Twickenham Library	1906		Roundel	Grade II	
	Diane de Gabies	Orleans House garden	c. 1910	Domenico Brucciani			
More images	Twickenham War Memorial	Radnor Gardens 51.44023°N 0.33187°W	1921	Mortimer Brown	Statue	Grade II*	
	Memorial to George Rowland Hill	Twickenham Stadium	1929	?	Relief		
	Relief representing electricity	42 York Street (former South Eastern Electricity Board building)	1930s	Percy George Bentham			
	The Spirit of Rugby (The Kicker, The Winger, The Scrum-Half and The Forward)	Entrance to West Stand, Twickenham Stadium 51.45554°N 0.34307°W	1994–1995	Gerald Laing	Statues	—N/a	
	Restless Kingdom	Outside Twickenham railway station 51°27′0.65″N 0°19′51″W	2003	Guy Rushworth Harden	Sculpture		
	Statue of Nick Duncombe	Twickenham Stoop	2005	Nathan David	Statue		
	B is for Boat – R is for River	Diamond Jubilee Gardens	2005	Kevin Herlihy			
	Core Values	Front of South Stand, Twickenham Stadium 51.45526°N 0.33904°W	2010	Gerald Laing (artist) and Black Isle Bronze Foundry	Sculptural group		
More images	Mural to the 60th anniversary of the Universal Declaration of Human Rights	Church Street, Twickenham, near York House 51°26′53″N 0°19′31″W	18 May 2010	Sam Haynes and pupils of Christ's and Grey Court Schools			
	Twickenham's War (2015)	Diamond Jubilee Gardens, The Frame (changing display of artworks)	June 2011	Roger Hutchins (frame) with artworks by Nathalie Palin, Rachel Craddock, Emily Allchurch and young people			
	Metal sculpture	Kneller Gardens 51.44691°N 0.34987°W	2012	Cuong Van Huynh, Oliver Jackman			
	And Still I Rise	Kneller Gardens	2023	Lois Anderson	Portland Stone		
	Poem (inscribed in ground around a poplar tree)	Diamond Jubilee Gardens	23 June 2012 (official opening)	Land Use Consultants LUC and The Landscape Group			
	The Four Seasons Insect Hotel	Twickenham Embankment 51°26′44.64″N 0°19′38.45″W	2014	Portia Baker and Emily Allchurch, children from Radnor House School and Orleans Junior School			
More images	Pope's Urn Alexander Pope	Champion's Wharf, Twickenham Riverside 51°26′48″N 0°19′29″W	2015	Feilden Clegg Bradley Studios	Stylised urn and benches		
	Rose and Poppy Gates	Twickenham Stadium	2016	Harry Gray	Gates		
More images	Memorial to the Belgian Village on the Thames	Warren Gardens, St Margarets 51.4545°N 0.3048°W	2017	Kristoffel Boudens			
	Sculpture	East Stand, Twickenham Stadium 51.45624°N 0.34017°W					
	Various wooden sculptures of wildlife	Kneller Gardens					
	Various sculptures	Champions Wharf, Twickenham Riverside 51.44651°N 0.32477°W					
	Sculpture of bullrushes	Champions Wharf, Twickenham Riverside 51.44642°N 0.32487°W					
	Bullrushes sculpture	The Japanese Garden, York House					
More images	St Mary's University, Twickenham	Strawberry Hill Park	19th century		Statues and reliefs		
	King Street mural	Junction of King Street and Water Lane	2023	Bobbie Galvin and Align Architects	Mural		

== Whitton ==
Image	Title / subject	Location and coordinates	Date	Artist / designer	Type	Designation	Notes
	Whitton Community Mosaic	Whitton High Street	2004	Adipost Ceramic Studio; Frances Grant		—N/a	
	12 benches carved with wildlife reliefs	Crane Park 51.4432°N 0.37534°W	Winter 2014 (3 benches), 9 earlier	Paul Sivell		—N/a	
	Mosaic	Crane Park, the tool store wall by the tower	2025				

== Bibliography ==
- Blomfield, David (2014). St Anne's Kew 1714–2014. R. J. L. Smith and Associates. ISBN 978-0-9573492-8-5.
- Bonavia, Michael (1990). London Before I Forget. The Self-Publishing Association. ISBN 1-85421-082-3.
- Matthews, Peter (2018). London's Statues and Monuments. Oxford: Shire Publications.
