= List of cemeteries, crematoria and memorials in Richmond upon Thames =

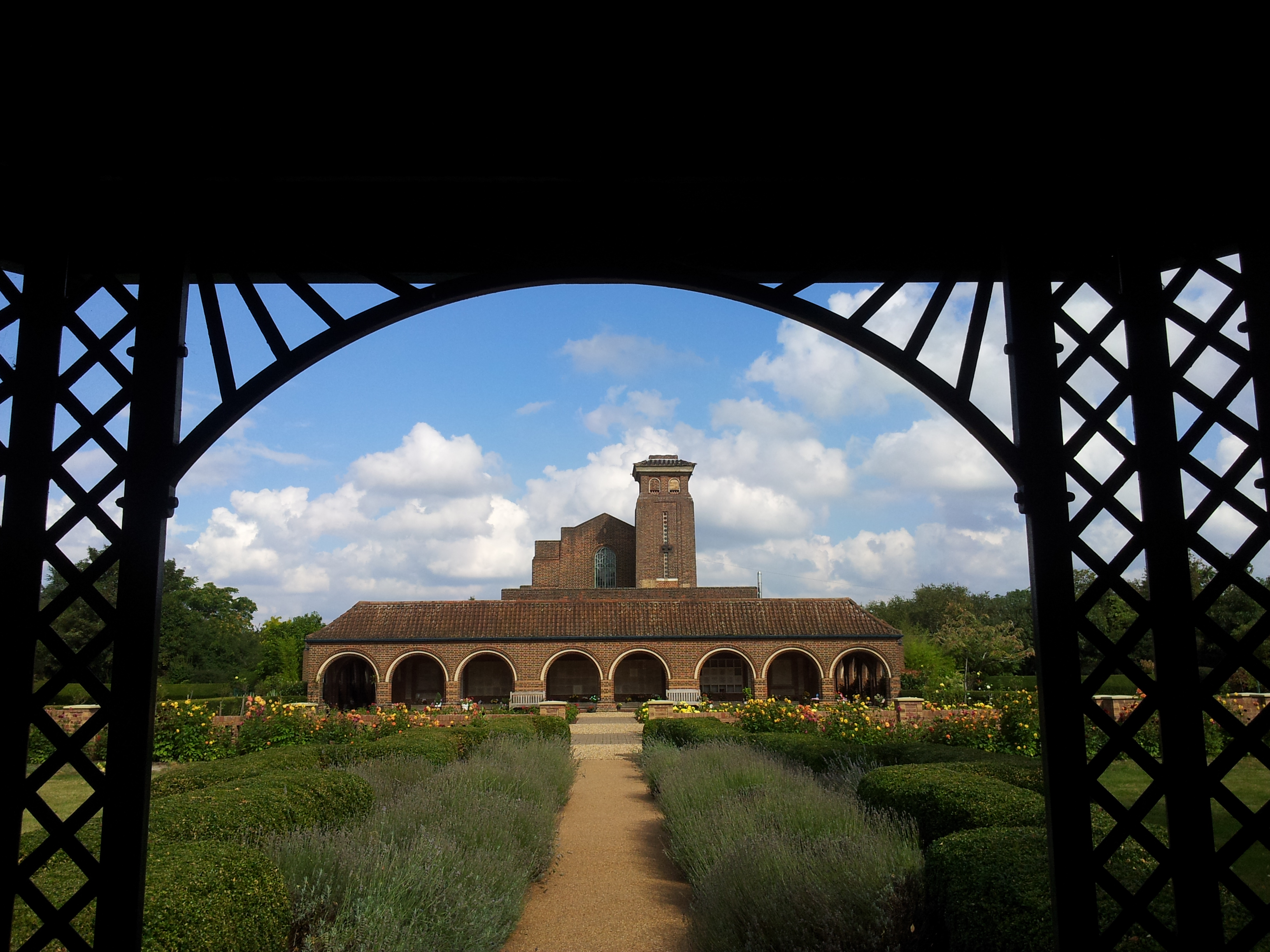
Mortlake Crematorium

This is a list of cemeteries, crematoria and memorials in the London Borough of Richmond upon Thames. It includes two cemeteries – Mortlake Cemetery and North Sheen Cemetery – that are managed by Hammersmith and Fulham London Borough Council.

== Cemeteries and burial grounds ==
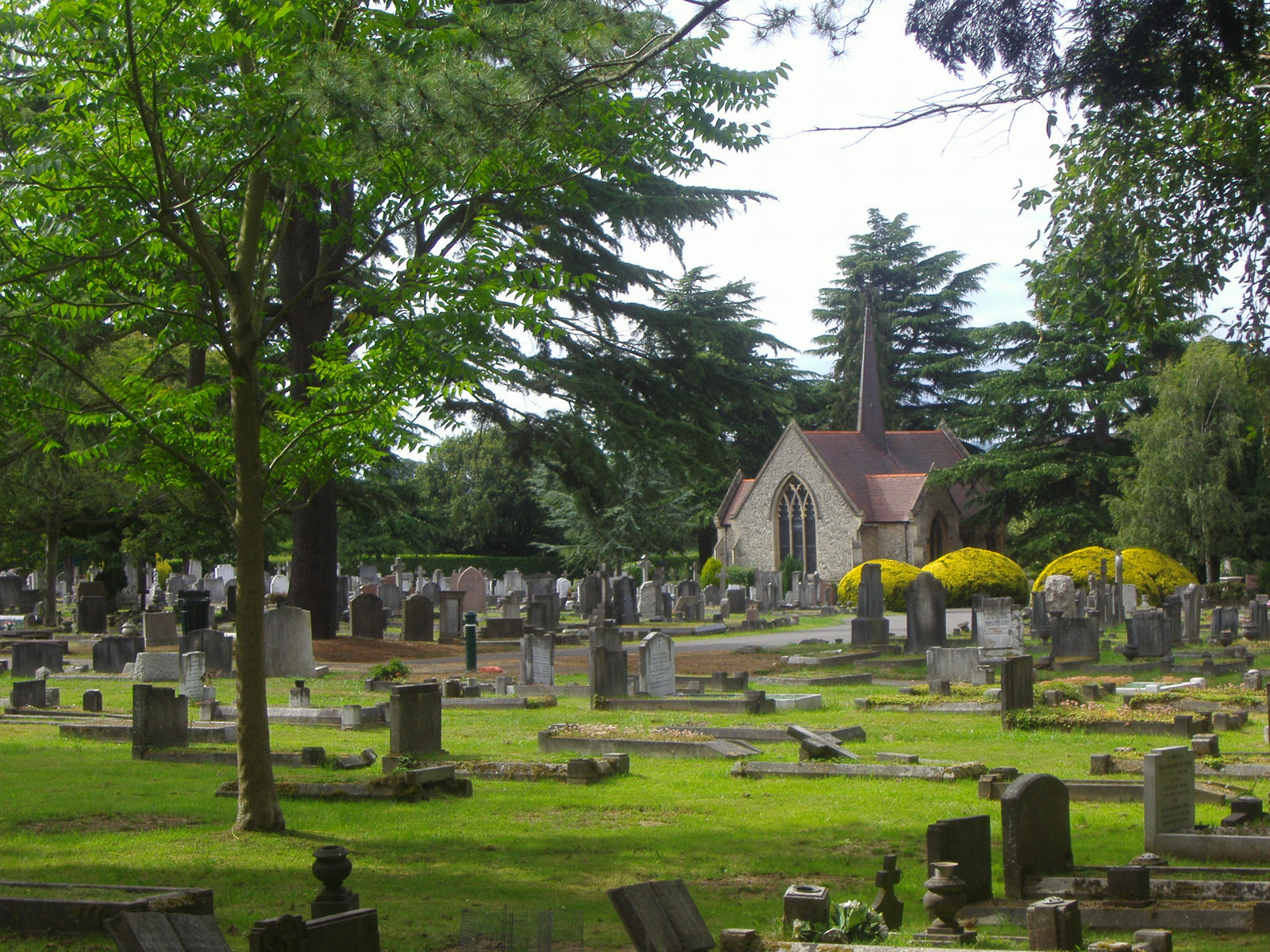
East Sheen Cemetery and chapel

- Barnes Cemetery, also known as Barnes Old Cemetery, is a disused cemetery in Barnes. It was established in 1854 and functioned as an additional burial ground to the local parish churchyard. A number of distinguished Victorians were buried there, with a variety of monuments and statues erected to their memory. At the centre of the cemetery is a large memorial to the Hedgman family, who were local benefactors in Barnes. The cemetery was claimed to be haunted by a ghostly nun that would hover over the grave of Julia Martha Thomas, the victim of an infamous murder in 1879. In 1966 the cemetery was acquired by Richmond upon Thames Council with the intention of turning it into a lawn cemetery. The council demolished the chapel and lodge and removed the boundary railings to prepare the cemetery for its new role. However, it then dropped the plans and effectively abandoned the cemetery.
- East Sheen Cemetery, in East Sheen, opened in 1906 and is now contiguous with Richmond Cemetery, though the original boundary is marked by a hedge. The cemetery's chapel, now used for services by both sites, was built in 1906 in the Gothic Revival style by local architect Reginald Rowell, who was himself later buried in the cemetery. The cemetery contains several particularly noticeable memorials. The most important monument in the cemetery is the memorial to coal mining industrialist George William Lancaster and his wife by Sydney March (1876–1968) – a bronze sculpture of an angel weeping over a stone sarcophagus dating from the 1920s. It was designated a Grade II* listed building in 1992, and according to Historic England is "considered one of the most significant 20th-century examples of funerary sculpture". The cemetery also contains over 70 war graves, cared for by the Commonwealth War Graves Commission.
- Hampton Cemetery, in Hampton, was opened in 1879. Fourteen Commonwealth servicemen and servicewomen of World War I and seven of World War II are buried in the cemetery.
- Mortlake Cemetery is a cemetery in Kew. It is also known as Hammersmith New Cemetery as it provided burials for the then Metropolitan Borough of Hammersmith when Margravine Cemetery was full. The cemetery opened in 1926 and is still in use. It is now managed by Hammersmith and Fulham Council. The cemetery includes the Commonwealth war graves of 109 service personnel of World War II, some of them in a special services plot in the south-eastern corner of the cemetery. Seventy-seven Commonwealth servicemen of World War II who were cremated at Mortlake Crematorium, which adjoins the cemetery, are listed on a screen wall memorial erected by the Commonwealth War Graves Commission in the cemetery. They include England rugby international Vivian Davies (1899–1941) who was a captain in the Royal Artillery. The memorial is listed Grade II by Historic England.

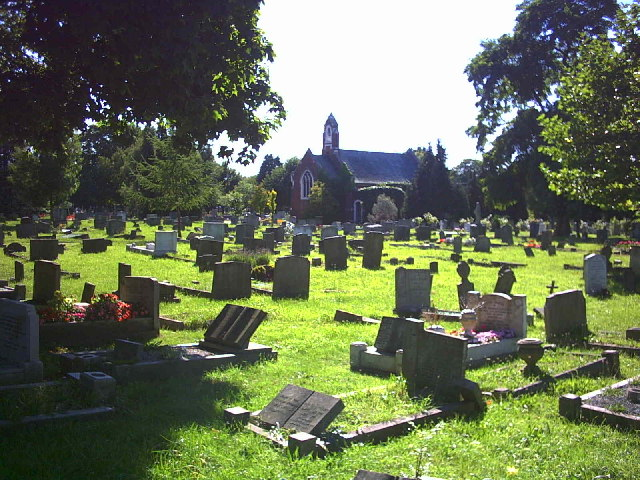
North Sheen Cemetery

- North Sheen Cemetery, established in 1909 and still in use, is in Kew (historically in North Sheen, Surrey). It is managed by Hammersmith and Fulham Council. The cemetery includes 110 identified graves of Commonwealth service personnel in the First and Second World Wars and a memorial garden.
- Old Mortlake Burial Ground, in Mortlake, was established in 1854, and enlarged in 1877. It includes Commonwealth war graves of 21 British service personnel, 19 from World War I and two from World War II.
- Richmond Cemetery, in Richmond, opened in 1786 and has been expanded several times. Many prominent people are buried in the cemetery, as are 39 soldiers who died at the South African Hospital in Richmond Park during the First World War and many ex-servicemen from the nearby Royal Star and Garter Home. These residents are commemorated by the Bromhead Memorial, which lists the names of those who are not commemorated elsewhere, while the South African soldiers are commemorated by a cenotaph designed by Sir Edwin Lutyens, derived from his design of the Cenotaph on Whitehall in central London. The war graves and the cenotaph are the responsibility of the Commonwealth War Graves Commission.
- Teddington Cemetery is a Grade II listed cemetery in Teddington. It opened in 1879, and includes the war graves of 70 Commonwealth service personnel, 42 from World War I and 28 from World War II.
- Twickenham Cemetery is a cemetery in Whitton. It was established in 1868 and was expanded in the 1880s when the local parish churchyards were closed to new burials.
- Vineyard Passage Burial Ground is a cemetery in Richmond. Established in 1790 and consecrated in 1791, it was enlarged in 1823. The last burials were in 1874. Managed by Richmond upon Thames Council and maintained by volunteers from the Environment Trust for Richmond upon Thames, it is now a garden of rest. It includes a Grade II monument to English architect Thomas Cundy (senior) (1765–1825) and his wife Mary. The brick walls to the cemetery (forming the side of Vineyard Passage) and the 19th-century iron railings are also Grade II listed.

== Crematoria ==
- Mortlake Crematorium in Kew was licensed in 1936 under the Mortlake Crematorium Act 1936, thereby becoming the first crematorium in England to be established under its own Act of Parliament. It opened in 1939 and has been a Grade II listed building since 2011, being assessed by Historic England as having "a distinctive Art Deco design that survives little altered in a compact and practical composition".

== Mausoleums ==
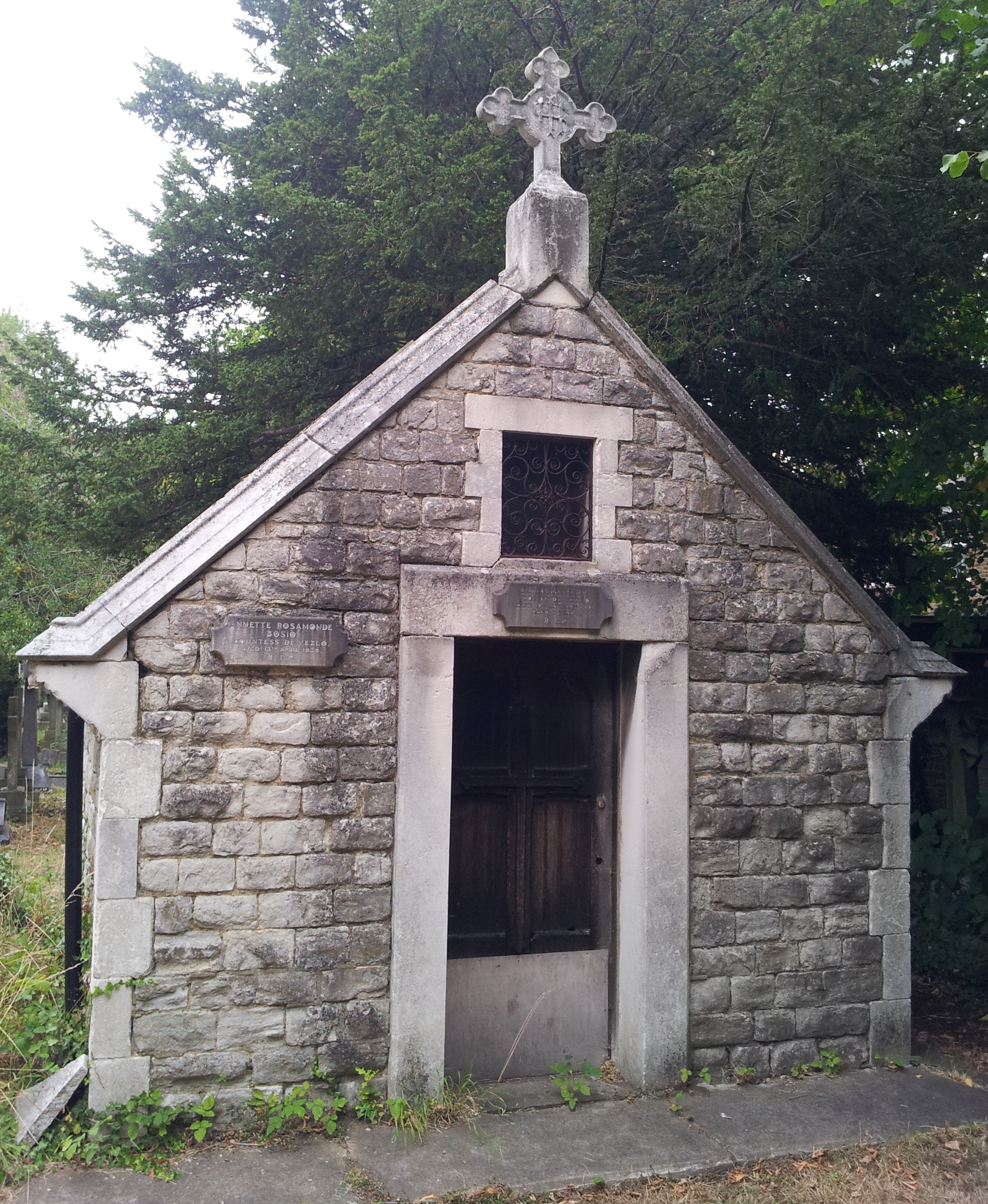
Comte de Vezlo Mausoleum

- The Comte de Vezlo Mausoleum, in the churchyard of St Mary Magdalen Roman Catholic Church, Mortlake, commemorates the very young Comte de Vezlo, Guilaume Henri (1894–1901). A plaque near the mauseolum's entrance also commemorates his mother, Annette Rosamonde Bosio, the Comtesse de Vezlo, who died in 1938.
- The Grade II* listed Kilmorey Mausoleum, in St Margarets, is in the style of an ancient Egyptian monument and has been described as a "fine example of an Egyptian-style mausoleum, with an unusually good interior". Designed by Henry Edward Kendall Jr. (1805–1885), it was commissioned in the 1850s by Francis Needham, 2nd Earl of Kilmorey (1787–1880) and contains the bodies of the Earl and his mistress, Priscilla Anne Hoste (1823–1854).
- The Mausoleum of Sir Richard and Lady Burton, in the churchyard of St Mary Magdalen Roman Catholic Church Mortlake, is a Grade II* listed tent-shaped mausoleum of Carrara marble and Forest of Dean stone. Completed in 1891, it contains the tombs of the Victorian explorer Sir Richard Burton (1821–1890), who took part in the search for the source of the River Nile and translated The Arabian Nights, and his wife Isabel, Lady Burton (1831–1896), who designed it.

== War memorials ==
- The Hampton Wick War Memorial, in Hampton Wick, was unveiled in 1921 and has been Grade II listed since 2015.
- The Richmond War Memorial, in Richmond, was unveiled in 1921 and has been Grade II listed since 2017.
- The South African War Memorial in Richmond Cemetery was designed by architect Sir Edwin Lutyens in the form of a cenotaph, similar to that on Whitehall, also by Lutyens. The memorial commemorates the 39 South African soldiers who died of their wounds at a military hospital in Richmond Park during the First World War. It was unveiled by General Jan Smuts in 1921 and has been Grade II listed since 2012.
- The Twickenham War Memorial in Radnor Gardens, designed by Mortimer Brown, was erected in 1921. It has been Grade II* listed since 2017.

Other listed war memorials include:

- The Kew War Memorial, near St Anne's Church, unveiled in 1921 and Grade II listed since 2015.
- The Mortlake and East Sheen War Memorial, in East Sheen, unveiled in 1925 and Grade II listed since 2017.
- The Petersham War Memorial, in the churchyard of St Peter's Church, unveiled in 1920 and Grade II listed since 2017.
- The Teddington War Memorial, in Teddington, unveiled in 1921 and Grade II listed since 2017.

== Other memorials ==
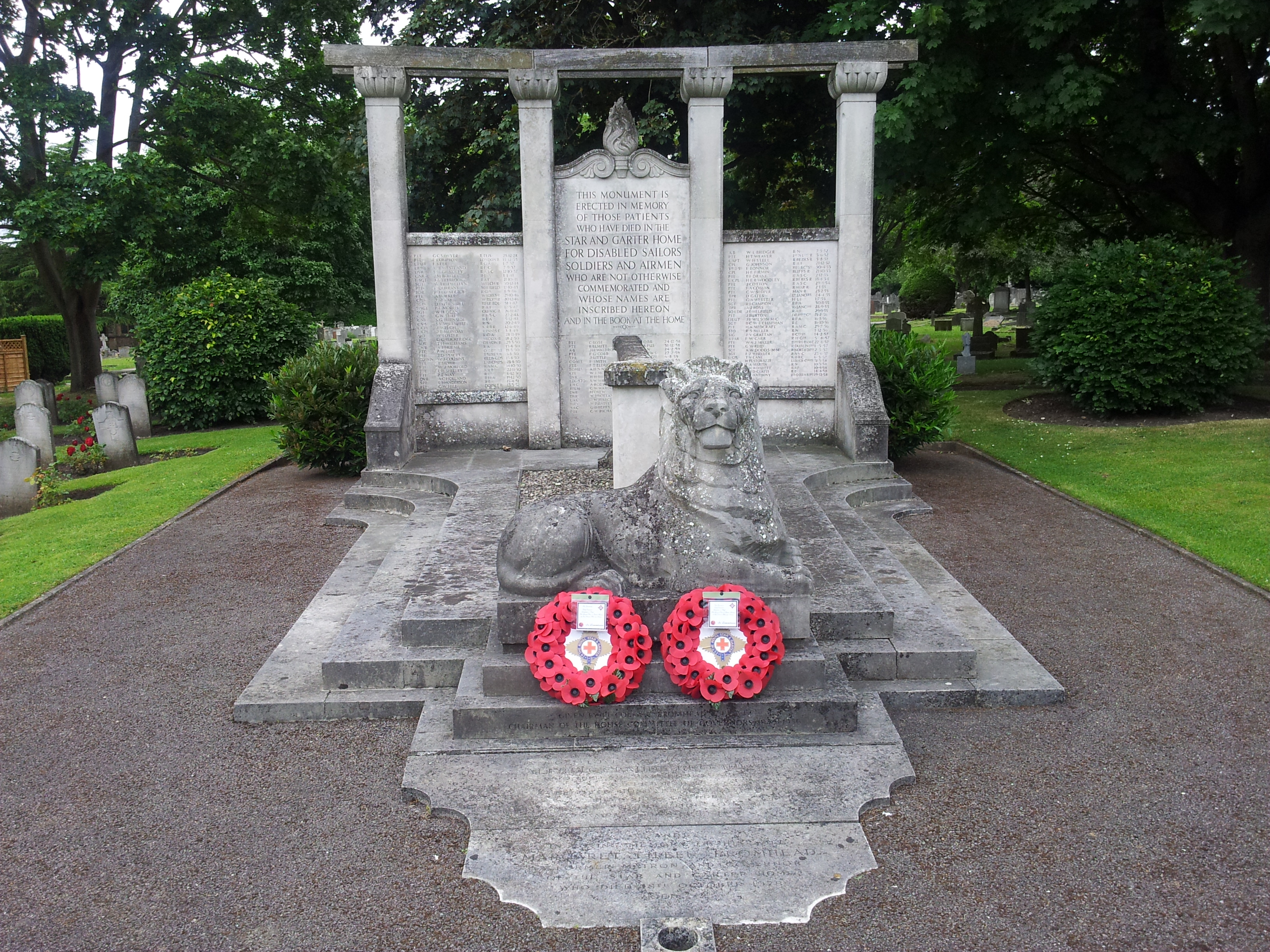
Bromhead Memorial

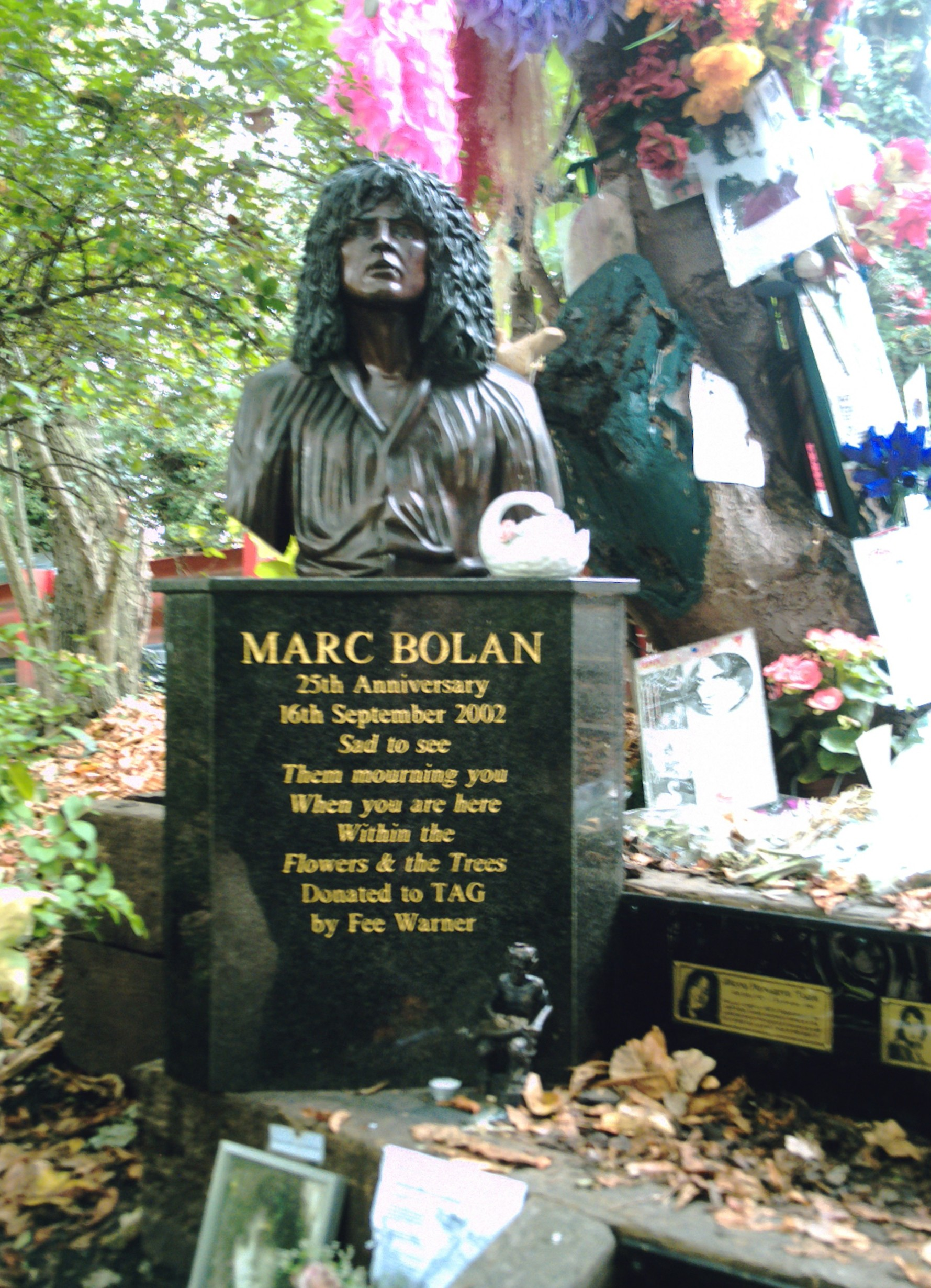
Bolan's shrine, on what would have been his 60th birthday, 30 September 2007

- The Bromhead Memorial is a Grade II listed memorial in Richmond Cemetery to deceased residents of the nearby Royal Star and Garter Home. It was commissioned as a gift from the Bromhead family in the name of Lieutenant Colonel Alfred Bromhead – who served as a governor of the Star and Garter Home – and his wife Margaret, who was also a governor and the home's matron. The memorial was designed by Cecil Thomas (1885–1976) and has been described by historian Darren Beach as "probably the finest sight at Richmond Cemetery".
- Marc Bolan's Rock Shrine is a memorial to Marc Bolan, of glam-rock band T-Rex, on the site where he died in a car crash in Barnes on 16 September 1977. It is recognised by the English Tourist Board in its guide England Rocks as a "Site of Rock 'n' Roll Importance" in England.
- The RSPCA Fountain is a Grade II listedmonument on Richmond Hill dedicated to the prevention of cruelty to animals. It was designed, in 1891 by Thomas Edward Collcutt, as a memorial to the work of a local branch of the RSPCA and was completed in 1901.
- There are several memorials in Richmond Park:
  - Tree plantations: The Jubilee Plantation, commemorating the Golden Jubilee of Queen Victoria, was established in 1887. Prince Charles' Spinney was planted out in 1951 with trees protected from the deer by fences, to preserve a natural habitat. The bluebell glade is managed to encourage native British bluebells. Teck Plantation, established in 1905, commemorates the Duke and Duchess of Teck, who lived at White Lodge. Their daughter Mary married George V. Tercentenary Plantation, in 1937, marked the 300th anniversary of the enclosure of the park. Victory Plantation was established in 1946 to mark the end of the Second World War. Queen Mother's Copse, a small triangular enclosure on the woodland hill halfway between Robin Hood Gate and Ham Gate, was established in 1980 to commemorate the 80th birthday of Queen Elizabeth The Queen Mother. The park lost over 1000 mature trees during the Great Storm of 1987 and the Burns' Day storm of 1990. The subsequent replanting included a new plantation, Two Storms Wood, a short distance into the park from Sheen Gate. Some extremely old trees can also be seen inside this enclosure.
  - James Thomson: A bench sculpted by Richard Farrington and known as "Poet's seat" is located at the north end of Pembroke Lodge Gardens, in a spot called Poet's Corner, which also has three curved benches inscribed with a couplet by the Welsh poet W. H. Davies (1871–1940), "A poor life this, if, full of care, we have no time to stand and stare". The seat is inscribed with lines by the poet James Thomson (1700–1748) who is also commemorated by a wooden memorial plaque with an ode to Thomson by the writer and historian John Heneage Jesse (1809–1874). King Henry's Mound, also in Pembroke Lodge Gardens, is inscribed with a few lines from Thomson's poem "The Seasons".
  - Ian Dury: In 2002 a "musical bench", designed by Mil Stricevic, was placed in a favoured viewing spot of rock singer and lyricist Ian Dury (1942–2000) near Poet's Corner. On the back of the bench are the words "Reasons to be cheerful", the title of one of Dury's songs. In 2015 the bench was refurbished, and now includes a QR code which, when scanned with a smartphone, gives access to nine Ian Dury and the Blockheads songs and Dury's Desert Island Discs interview with Sue Lawley, first broadcast on BBC Radio 4 on 15 December 1996.

== Sources ==
- McDowall, David (1996). Richmond Park: The Walker's Historical Guide. ISBN 978-0952784708. OCLC 36123245. OL 8477606M.
