= Laury Dizengremel =

British sculptor (born 1954)

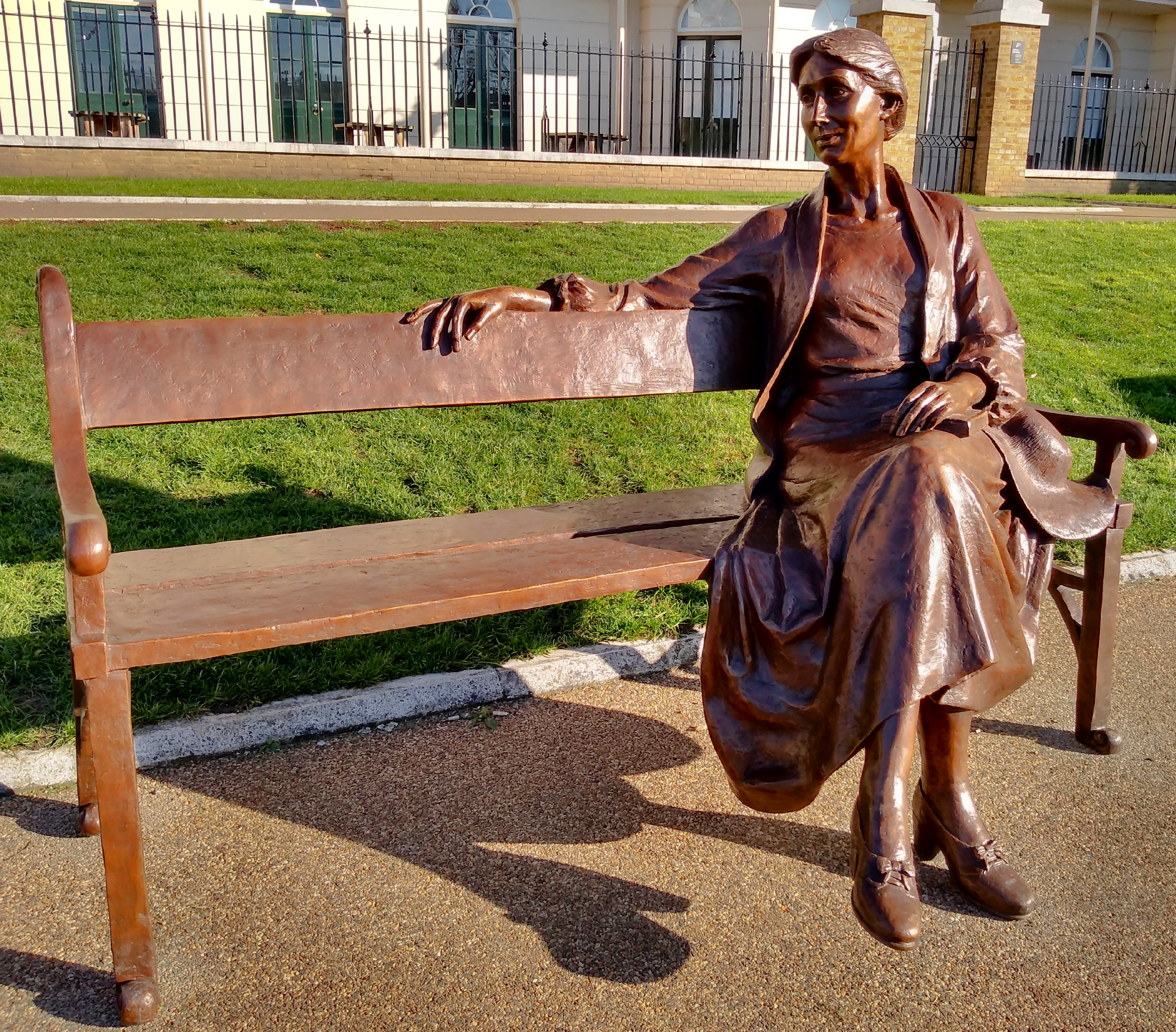
Statue of Virginia Woolf at Richmond Riverside, Richmond, London

Laury Dizengremel (born 1954) is a French sculptor. Her works include a statue of Virginia Woolf, one of the most influential 20th-century modernist authors, which sits overlooking the Thames at Richmond Riverside in London, England. It was erected in November 2022.

Her other works include statues of Kenneth Dunbar, a former master of the Merchant Company of Edinburgh, and of the 18th-century gardener and landscape architect Lancelot 'Capability' Brown. installed in 2017 at Distillery Wharf, Hammersmith, London.

== Early life and education ==
Dizengremel was born in Paris to a Dutch mother and a French father and spent some of her early childhood in the United States before returning to France at age 6. She holds a Master of Arts (MA) from the University for the Creative Arts.
