= List of public art in the London Borough of Hammersmith and Fulham =

This is a list of public art in the London Borough of Hammersmith and Fulham.

== Fulham ==
Image	Title / subject	Location and coordinates	Date	Artist / designer	Type	Material	Designation	Notes
	Cock	Roof of The Cock, North End Road 51.4813°N 0.1997°W	19th century		Statue		Grade II	
	Marshall War Memorial Walter Langley Marshall; the WWI dead of the parish; the 3rd Fulham Scouts	St Peter's churchyard, St Peter's Terrace 51.4792°N 0.2081°W	1919	G. Maile and Sons	Crucifix	Cornish granite	Grade II	An unusual combined memorial to the priest of the church, who died in 1917, and the war dead.
	War memorial	Churchyard of St Thomas of Canterbury, Rylston Road 51.4815°N 0.2066°W	c. 1920	?	Memorial cross	Stone	Grade II	Originally sited near the church's south porch; relocated in 1967.
More images	Fulham War Memorial	Vicarage Gardens 51.4689°N 0.2112°W	1921	Alfred Turner	War memorial with sculpture		Grade II	Unveiled 10 July 1921.
More images	All Saints' Church War Memorial	All Saints' churchyard 51.4685°N 0.2122°W	1923	?	Calvary		Grade II	Unveiled May 1923.
	Adoration	Bishops Park	1953	James Wedgwood	Sculpture	Stone	—N/a	
	Grief	Bishops Park	1953	James Wedgwood	Sculpture	Stone	—N/a	
	Leda	Bishops Park	1953	James Wedgwood	Sculpture	Stone	—N/a	
	Protection	Bishops Park	1953	James Wedgwood	Sculpture	Stone	—N/a	
	Affection	Bishops Park	1963	Joseph Hermon Cawthra	Sculpture	Stone	—N/a	
	Clarion	Fulham Broadway	c. 1981	Philip King	Sculpture	Steel	—N/a	
	Gateway of Hands	Chelsea Harbour 51.4746°N 0.1805°W	1991	Glynn Williams	Sculpture	Bronze	—N/a	
More images	International Brigades Memorial	Fulham Palace Gardens 51.4686°N 0.2137°W	31 August 1997 (erected)		Memorial		—N/a	
More images	Statue of Johnny Haynes	Craven Cottage stadium, Stevenage Road 51.4747°N 0.2206°W	2008	Douglas Jennings	Statue	Bronze	—N/a	
More images	Statue of Peter Osgood	Stamford Bridge stadium	2010	Philip Jackson	Statue	Bronze	—N/a	
More images	The Mother and the Child	All Saints' churchyard 51.4686°N 0.2122°W	2013 (after an original of 2000)	Helen Sinclair	Statue	Resin	—N/a	Replica of a bronze version, the top half of which was sawn off and stolen in 2012.
	Statue of George Cohen	Craven Cottage	2016	Douglas Jennings	Statue	Bronze	—N/a	Unveiled 1 October 2016.
	Space for Nature Spiral	Chelsea Creek	2023	Lorne McKean	Sculpture	Bronze	—N/a	
	Swooping House Martins	Chelsea Creek	2023	Tanya Russell	Sculpture	Bronze	—N/a	London's largest colony of house martins is located a short distance north of the residential development.
	100 Found Objects	Fulham Pier, Craven Cottage 51.4747°N 0.2223°W	2025	Yinka Ilori			—N/a	

== Hammersmith ==
Image	Title / subject	Location and coordinates	Date	Artist / designer	Type	Material	Dimensions	Designation	Notes
More images	Bull	King Street, outside No. 257 (Ravenscourt Arms pub) 51°29′35.4″N 0°14′19.3″W	19th century (placed here 1904)		Statue			Grade II	
	Swan mosaic	Swan pub, 40 Hammersmith Broadway 51°29′34.8″N 0°13′29.8″W	c. 1878		Mosaic			—N/a	
	Royal Arms, accompanied by the arms of the City of London, the City of Westminster (historic), Guildford, Kent, Middlesex (historic) and Colchester	On Hammersmith Bridge (part also in Richmond upon Thames) 51°29′21″N 0°13′46″W	1887	Joseph Bazalgette	Motif			Grade II*	
	Drinking fountain memorial to S. L. Swaab	King Street, outside No. 243 (Palingswick House) 51°29′35.4″N 0°14′15.6″W	1887		Memorial fountain			—N/a	
	Spinning, Geography and Astronomy	Hammersmith Library, Shepherd's Bush Road 51°29′41.1″N 0°13′25.8″W	1905	Frederick E. E. Schenck	Architectural sculpture			Grade II	
	Statue of John Milton	Hammersmith Library, Shepherd's Bush Road 51°29′40.8″N 0°13′25.8″W	1905	Frederick E. E. Schenck	Architectural sculpture			Grade II	
	Statue of William Shakespeare	Hammersmith Library, Shepherd's Bush Road 51°29′40.5″N 0°13′25.8″W	1905	Frederick E. E. Schenck	Architectural sculpture			Grade II	
	Literature and The Visual Arts	Hammersmith Library, Shepherd's Bush Road 51°29′40.2″N 0°13′25.8″W	1905	Frederick E. E. Schenck	Architectural sculpture			Grade II	
	Garlands and Royal Arms	Hammersmith Library, Shepherd's Bush Road	1905	Frederick E. E. Schenck	Architectural sculpture			Grade II	
	War memorial	Former Church of St John the Evangelist 51.4946°N 0.2303°W	after 1918	?	Memorial cross			Grade II	
	Blake's Munitions War Memorial	Margravine Cemetery 51°29′20.756″N 0°12′59.915″W	1920	William Blake Richmond	Memorial	Stone		Grade II	Memorial and grave marker for 13 people killed by an explosion at a munitions factory in October 1918.
More images	Greek Runner	St Peter's Square 51°29′30.9″N 0°14′38.7″W	1926 (erected)	William Blake Richmond	Statue	Bronze		Grade II	
	William Bull Gate	King Street, forming an entrance to Ravenscourt Park 51°29′37″N 0°14′21.3″W	1933		Gateway			—N/a	
	Draped Woman a.k.a. Leaning Woman	North verge of A4 at Black Lion Lane 51°29′28″N 0°14′31.8″W	1959	Karel Vogel	Statue	Concrete		Grade II	
	West Berlin lamppost	On Westcott Lodge in Lower Mall, facing Furnival Gardens 51°29′25″N 0°13′55.8″W	1963 (erected)		Memorial			—N/a	
	Working Model for Reclining Figure (Lincoln Center) 1963–65	Charing Cross Hospital, main entrance 51°29′13″N 0°13′16″W	1963–1965	Henry Moore	Sculpture	Bronze	length 427cm	—N/a	On loan from Tate.
	Hammersmith Bridge mural	Entrance to Hammersmith tube station (Piccadilly and District lines) 51°29′33.9″N 0°13′26.0″W	1990s		Mural			—N/a	
	Etcetera	Entrance to Hammersmith Broadway 51°29′34.2″N 0°13′28.0″W	1991; 2003	Crispin Guest (components); Michael Johnson (arrangement and plinth)	Sculptural group			—N/a	
	Memorial to Giles Hart	Ravenscourt Park, near lake 51°29′51″N 0°14′17.5″W	5 July 2008 (erected)		Memorial			—N/a	
More images	Figurehead	Thames Path 51.4869°N 0.2267°W	2014	Rick Kirby	Statue	Metal		—N/a	
	Memorial plaque to William Tierney Clark	Fulham Reach, overlooking Hammersmith Bridge	2014		Relief			—N/a	Clark designed the predecessor to the current Hammersmith Bridge; the plaque shows him with his Széchenyi Chain Bridge in Budapest.
More images	Statue of Capability Brown	Riverside Walk 51.4873°N 0.2274°W	2017	Laury Dizengremel	Statue	Bronze		—N/a	Unveiled 24 May 2017. Commissioned to mark the tercentenary of Brown's birth; he was a local resident.
	Untitled	Riverside Studios, Queen's Wharf	2019	Jo Hayes Ward	Architectural sculpture	Steel and aluminium bronze		—N/a	

== Shepherd's Bush ==
Image	Title / subject	Location and coordinates	Date	Artist / designer	Type	Material	Dimensions	Designation	Notes
More images	Hammersmith War Memorial	Shepherd's Bush Green 51°30′15″N 0°13′12″W	1922	Henry Charles Fehr	War memorial with sculpture			Grade II	
	Memorial to the Shepherd's Bush murders	Braybrook Street 51°31′8.8″N 0°14′41.2″W	1988	Police Memorial Trust	Memorial			—N/a	
	The Circle of Life	Main entrance, Hammersmith Hospital 51°30′59″N 0°14′9″W	1993	Sarah Tombs	Sculpture			—N/a	
	Goaloids	Shepherd's Bush Green 51°30′14.3″N 0°13′22.0″W	2012	Elliott Brook	Sculpture			—N/a	

== See also ==
- Statue of Michael Jackson (Fulham F.C.), which stood outside Craven Cottage stadium from 2011 to 2013
