= Bishops Park =

Park in Fulham, London

Coordinates: 51°28′14″N 0°12′58″W

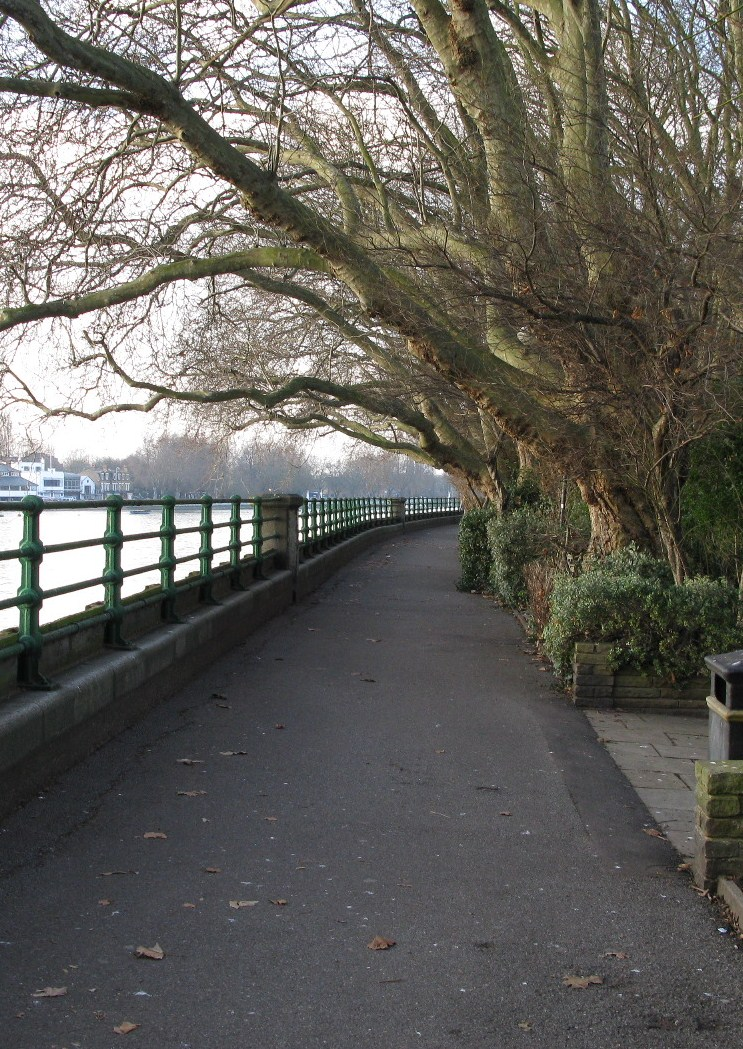
Embankment walkway, Bishops Park

Bishops Park is a park in Fulham, West London. The park was opened by the London County Council in 1893, on land given by the Church Commissioners. It is listed Grade II on the register of parks and gardens of special historic interest maintained by English Heritage.

The park runs north of the River Thames from All Saints church along a broad tree-lined avenue of London Plane trees and an embankment path along the river, and ends at Bishop's Park Road. It contains tennis courts and bowling greens, with another small park area fronting Fulham Palace Road which is known as the Moat Garden. It is adjacent to Fulham Palace and Fulham Football club.

A memorial to members of the International Brigade who volunteered to fight in the Spanish Civil War has been located within the park since 1997. The park has a poolside beach and facilities for basketball, tennis, table tennis, lawn bowling and skate boarding.

== History ==
The park was formally opened by Sir John Hutton, chairman of the LCC, in 1893. It included land known as Bishop's Walk, Bishop's Meadow and West Meadow, formerly owned by the Church of England as Lord of the Manor of Fulham, and administered by the Ecclesiastical Commissioners. It had been given over to the Fulham District Board of Works on condition that it be laid out and maintained for public recreation.

The meadows had already been protected from flooding by the creation of an embankment; the river wall was built between 1889 and 1893 by Joseph Mears, the father of Chelsea F.C. founders Joseph and Gus Mears.

In 1894 the Ecclesiastical Commissioners sold Fulham Vestry, the house of Pryors Bank (then called Vine Cottage) and its gardens. The house was demolished in 1897 and replaced by a Pseudo-Tudo refreshment pavilion, but the gardens were preserved and opened as an extension of Bishops Park in 1900 after extension of the river walk. They contain four 1940s sculptures titled Adoration, Protection, Grief and Leda, presented in 1953 by sculptor James Wedgwood as a commemoration of the coronation of Queen Elizabeth II.

A further sculpture, Affection, a mother and child by Joseph Hermon Cawthra, was added in 1963; both sculptors had studios in the area. The park was expanded again in 1903.

Scenes from the 1976 horror film The Omen were shot on location in the park.

After a successful lottery funding bid in February 2011, the park underwent a major restoration project, when it lost its Victorian bandstand, with almost the entire site being modernised.
