= Hampton Court astronomical clock =

16th-century astronomical clock in London

Coordinates: 51.403425°N 0.338092°W

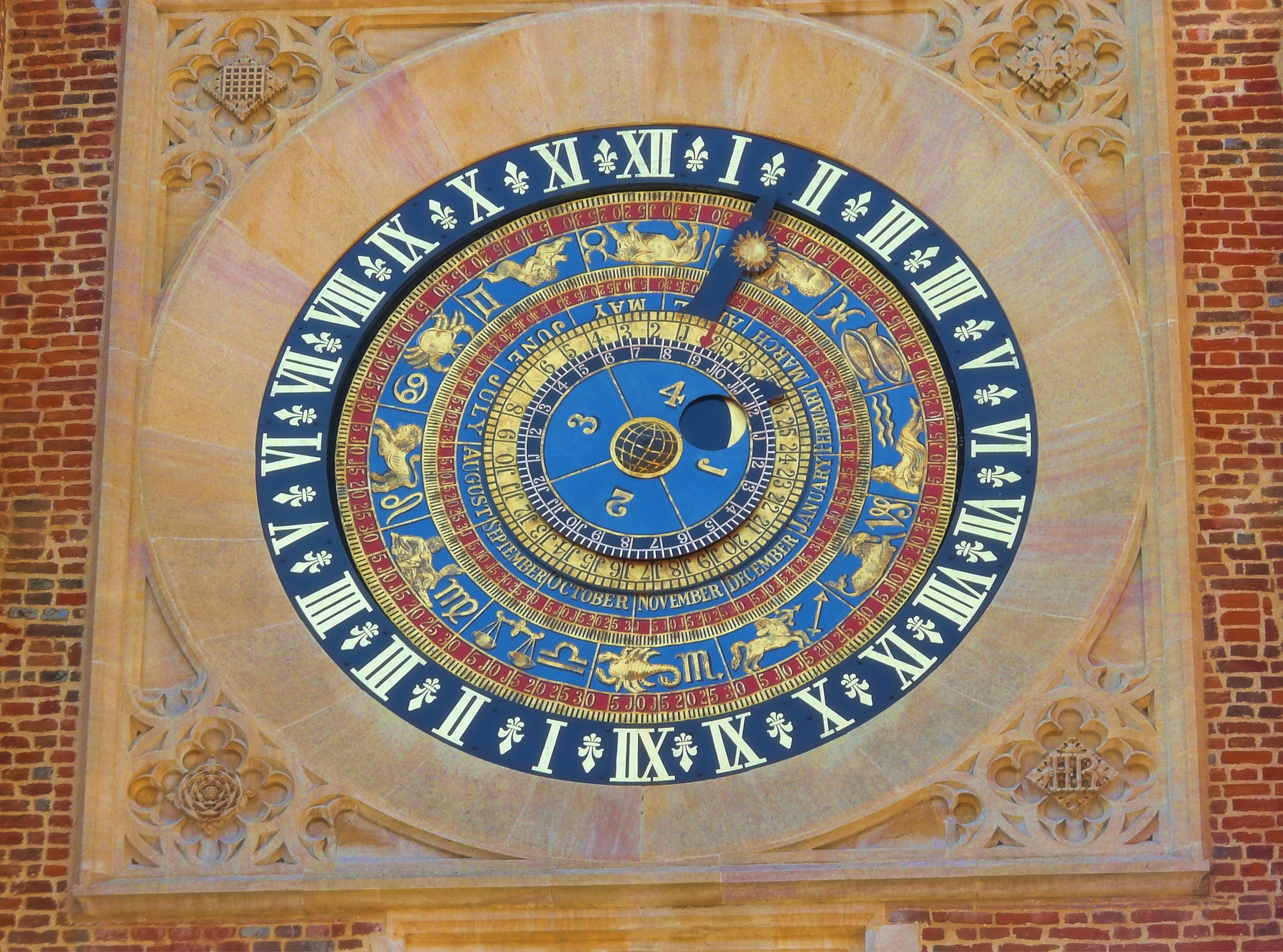
Hampton Court Astronomical Clock

Hampton Court astronomical clock is a sixteenth-century astronomical clock in Hampton Court Palace in England.

== History and description ==
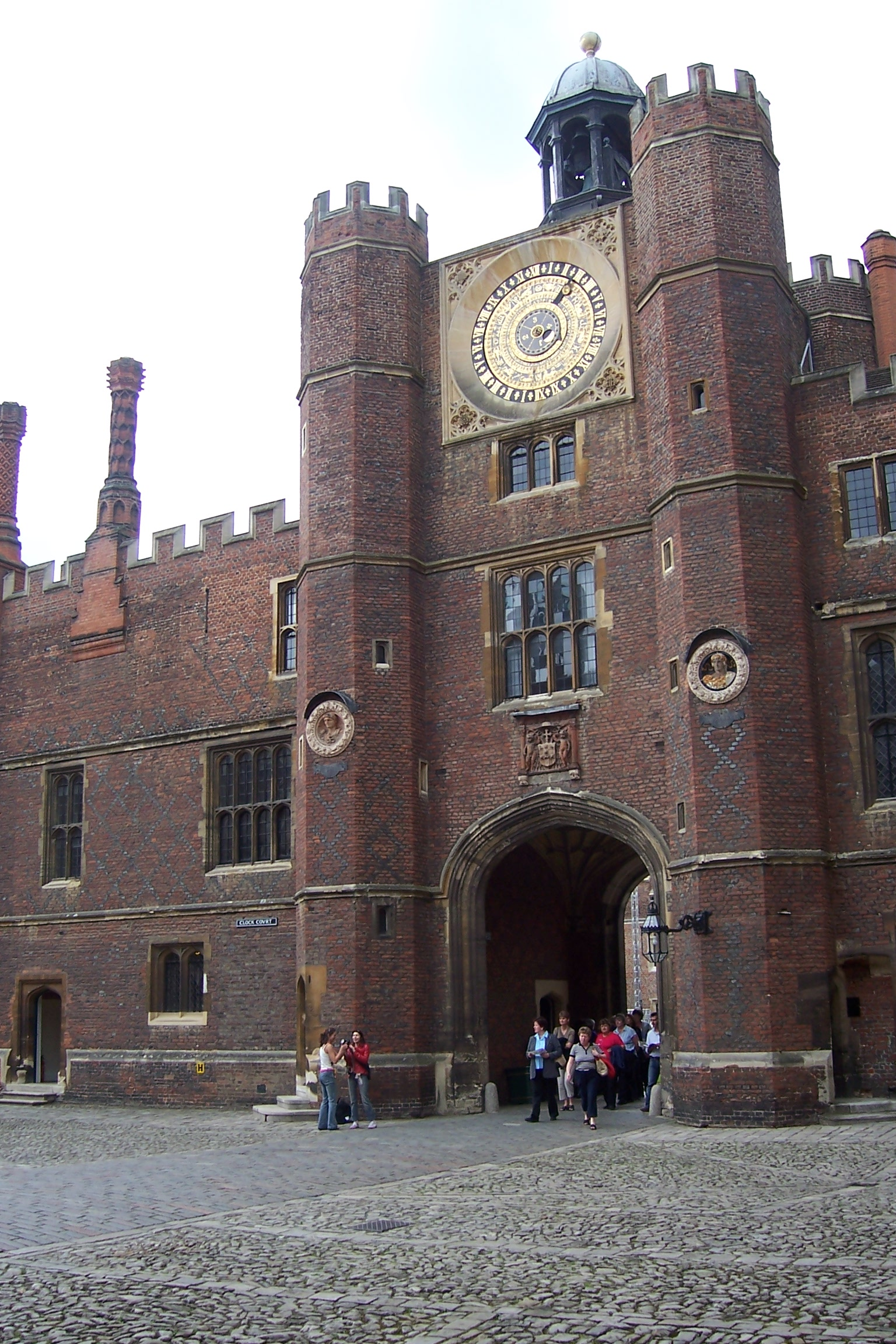
The clock face in the tower

The clock was installed in 1540 on the gatehouse to the inner court at Hampton Court Palace. It was designed by Nicholas Kratzer and made by Nicholas Oursian. This pre-Copernican and pre-Galilean astronomical clock is still functioning.

The clock is 15 feet (4.6 m) in diameter with three concentric copper discs revolving at different speeds:

- The golden disc numbered 1 to 29 for the days of the lunar month, which is attached to the hour pointer marked with the sun, rotates once in 24 hours.
- The disc showing the zodiac and the months rotates once in a sidereal day, approximately 23 hours 56 minutes, so that the displacement between this disc and the sun completes a cycle in a year.
- The central disc with the moon window rotates once in approximately 24 hours 49 minutes, so that the displacement between this disc and the golden disc completes a cycle in a lunar month.

It displays the following information:

- Hour
- Month
  - Day of month
- Twelve signs of the zodiac
  - Position of the Sun in the ecliptic relative to the background stars (zodiac)
- Number of days since the beginning of the year
- Phases of the moon
  - Days since last new moon (poet. "age of the moon")
    - Hour when it passes meridian/anti-meridian and thus high water at London Bridge.

The latter information was of great importance to those visiting this Thames-side palace from London, as the preferred method of transport at the time was by barge. Two consequences flowed: journey time, which departing around high water would speed instead of hinder; and all but the most skilled or reckless watermen above the bridge would avoid nearing London Bridge at times of great surface-water ebb under the (then famously built-up, barrage-like) bridge to avoid being swept into the starlings (cutwaters) or arches above.

The clock was restored in 1711 by William Herbert, with a simplified 18th century face, while retaining the 24-hour dial, and a single clock hand. The astrological dials were removed, and subsequently mislaid. In 1831 the mechanism was replaced with that of a 1799 clock from St James's Palace. In 1879 the astronomical dials were rediscovered and replaced, and Gillett & Bland manufactured a new clock movement.

The clock was fully restored in 2007 and 2008 by the Cumbria Clock Company in Dacre, Cumbria in time for the 500th anniversary of the accession of King Henry VIII.

The clock features both on the cover and in the plot of Robert Galbraith’s Troubled Blood.

== See also ==
- List of public art in Richmond upon Thames
