= Joseph Mears =

English businessman, co-founder of Chelsea F.C. (1871-1935)

Joseph Theophilus "JT" Mears (1871 – October 1935), was an English businessman, most notable for co-founding Chelsea Football Club.

== Early life ==
He was born in 1871 in Hammersmith, London, the elder son of Joseph Mears, a builder.

== Career ==
In 1896, Mears and his brother Gus purchased the Stamford Bridge Athletics Ground and went on to found Chelsea Football Club in 1905. Though he was never chairman, Joseph was the "dominant influence" at the club after the death of his brother in 1912 with his son, Joe, and grandson, Brian, both later serving as chairman of the football club.

In 1907, Mears acquired the business of the Thames Electric & Motor Launch Co at Eel Pie Island and he went on to build up a large fleet of passenger launches on the Thames.

In 1919 he formed his business into Joseph Mears Launches & Motors Ltd, and acquired a garage in Richmond, along with several motor coaches. The company continued until 1945, when it passed to a newly formed company, Thames Launches Ltd.

He formed Joseph Mears Cinemas Ltd which built up a group of cinemas around the Richmond area. Several of the cinemas were later sold to Odeon Cinemas, including the Richmond Kinema which became the Odeon Richmond and the Kensington Kinema which similarly became the Odeon Kensington.

Mears was Mayor of Richmond from 1931 to 1932.

== Death ==
He died in October 1935 and is buried in Richmond Cemetery in London. Mears left an estimated fortune of £30m.
