= Hampton Youth Project =

Youth centre in Hampton, London

The Hampton Youth Project is a youth centre located in Hampton, London, a town in the London Borough of Richmond Upon Thames.

== Information ==
It caters to young people aged 11–19 in the Hampton area, and is open six evenings a week. The club is part of the Richmond Youth Service. The Hampton Youth Project is situated in the Nurserylands Estate in Hampton, London, and it has been available for the youth since the year of 1990. The club in general provides a place for adolescents to come and do various activities. The club includes an indoor sports hall, a 30 feet tall climbing wall, an indoor archery area, a youth café, a social area, and a music and recording studio that is available to the kids. The club is closed on the weekend, and it is open during the week. The Hampton Youth Project is also available and provide services to adolescents who have questions or concerns about their sexual health. They provide advice, information, and free condoms to young people.
