= Giovanni da Maiano =

Italian sculptor

Giovanni da Maiano II (c. 1486 – c. 1542) was an Italian sculptor employed by Henry VIII of England and Cardinal Wolsey to decorate their palaces. Maiano, from which village Giovanni took his name, is near Fiesole and Florence. He was the son of Benedetto da Maiano.

== The Hampton Court medallions and Greenwich Palace ==
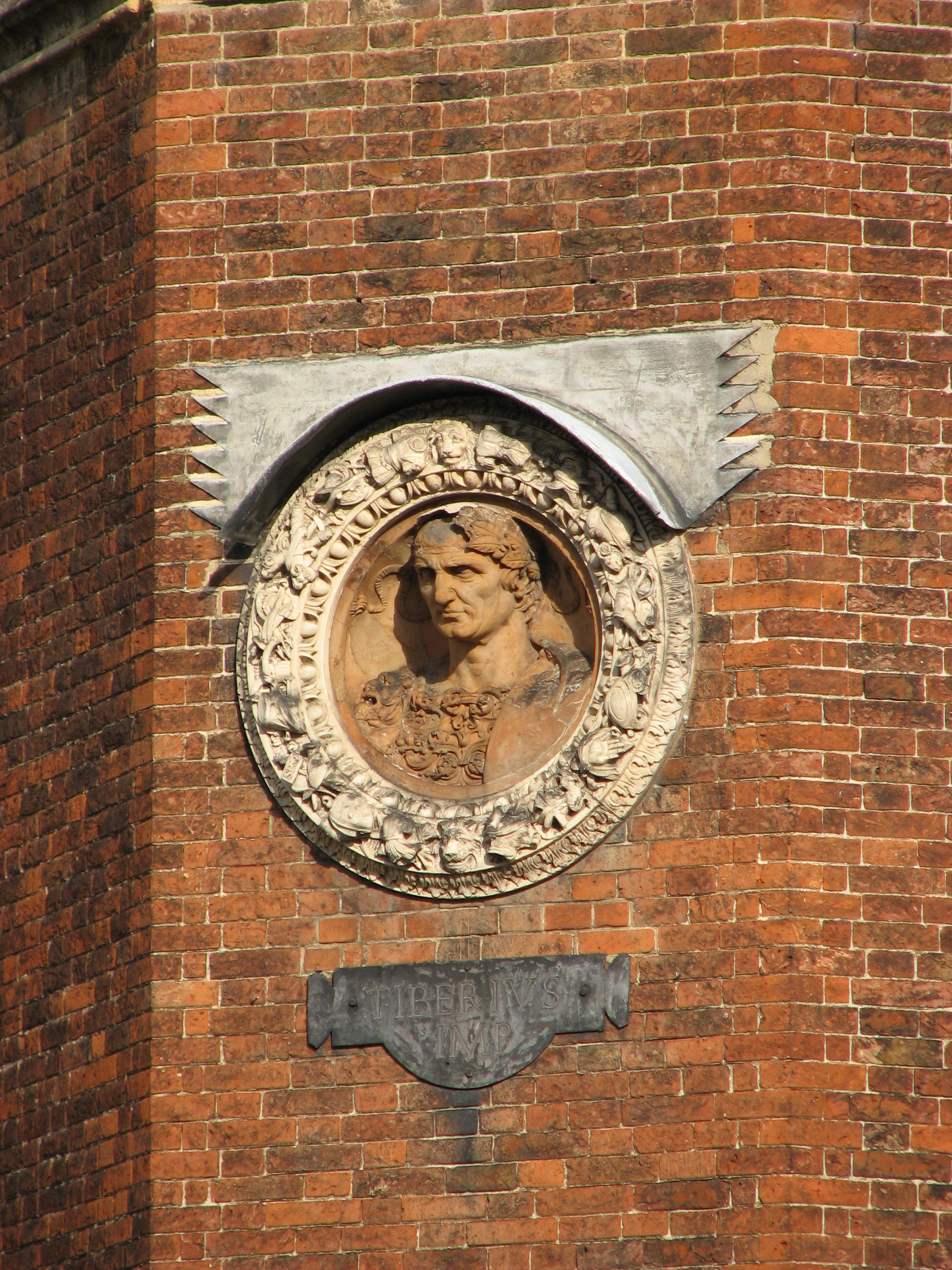
Bust of Tiberius

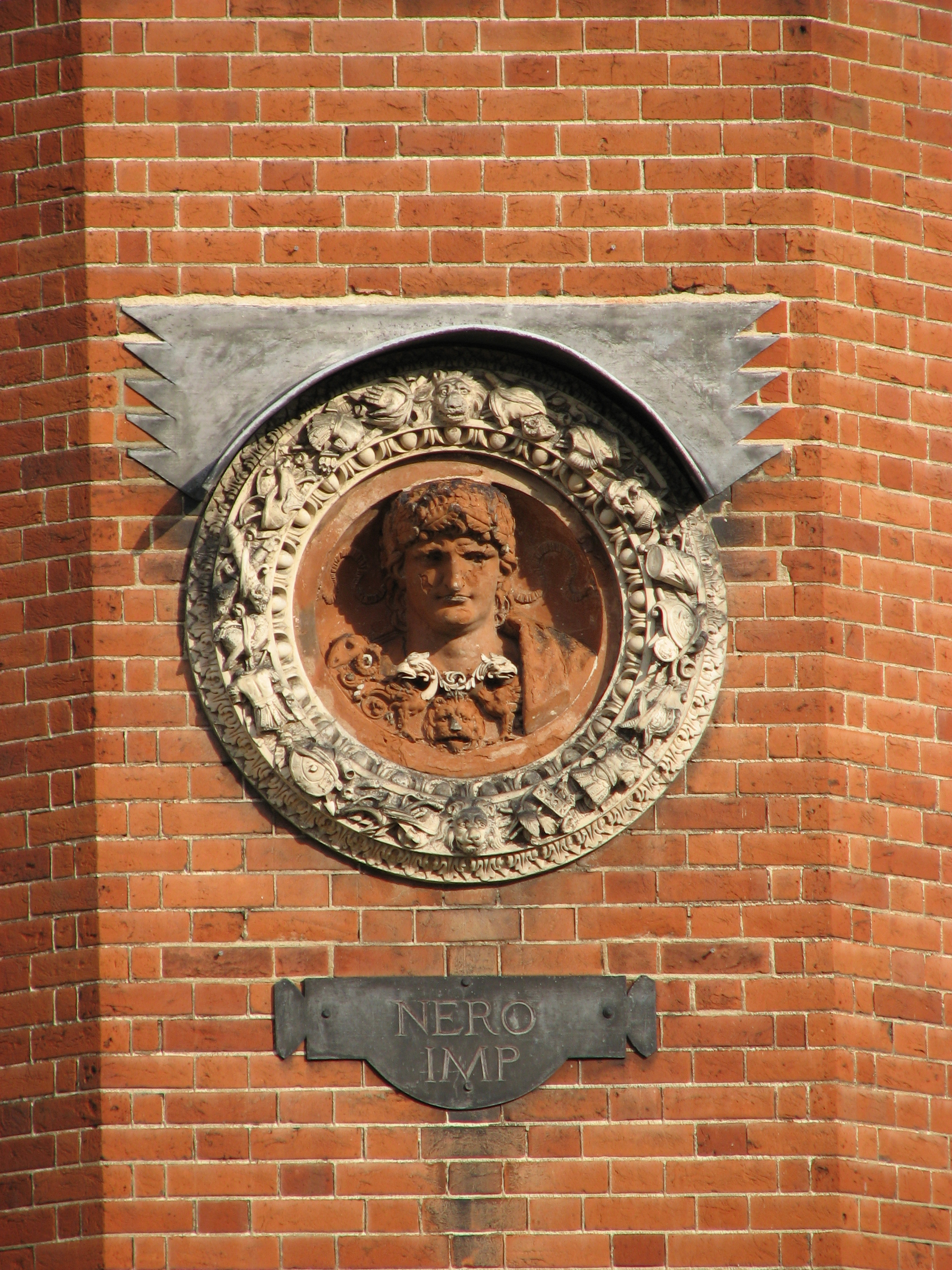
Bust of Nero

Two of the medallions at Hampton Court designed by Giovanni da Maiano.

In June 1521, Giovanni wrote from Rome in Latin to Cardinal Wolsey requesting payment for his work at Hampton Court. He had made, painted, and gilded, eight terracotta medallions costing £2 6s 8d each, with three Stories of Hercules costing £4 each, with 20 shillings expense on fixing the sculptures. Some of these medallions commissioned by Wolsey can still be seen in place on the palace.

From 1527 Giovanni worked with Hans Holbein the Younger on decorations at Greenwich Palace for Henry VIII. Some of his relief decorations for a temporary banqueting house were made with old linen cloth in a papier-mâché technique. Edward Hall described these decorations in his Chronicle; the windows of the banqueting house had grotesque-work, "karved with vinettes and trailes of savage worke, and richly gilted with gold and bice," on the arches at either end of the hall were made "many sundry antiques and devices". The bill for Giovanni's work for the temporary banqueting hall at Greenwich Palace, includes six "antique hedds, gilt, silveryd, and painted at xxvjs viijd [26s-8d] the pece". These were probably the busts of emperors mentioned by the Venetian diplomat Gasparo Spinelli. Giovanni made the heads at a workshop at Bridewell, and they were carried by boat to the palace.

In 1532, the painter Anthony Toto and "John de la Mayn" (Giovanni da Maiano) were employed at Hanworth in Middlesex to set up "antique heads", medallions of Roman emperors.

The engraved decoration of armour produced in the royal workshop at Greenwich is thought to have been influenced by Giovanni's Italian renaissance style.

Giovanni began to work on a tomb for Wolsey with the Italian sculptor and bronze-founder, Benedetto da Rovezzano, but the project had to be abandoned after the Cardinal fell out of royal favour in 1529. The artist and biographer of artists, Giorgio Vasari mentions the project under Benedetto's name, but thought the tomb was for Henry VIII.

Other Italian craftsmen employed by the Tudor court include Archangelo Arcano and Niccolo da Modena.
