= Hampton Wick War Memorial =

War memorial in London

- England, United Kingdom
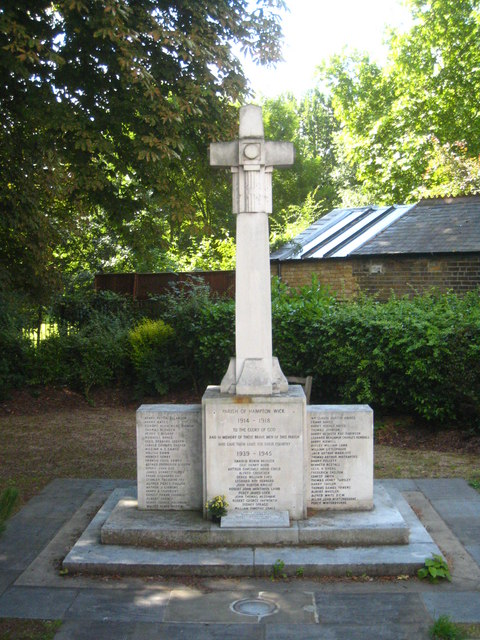
- For Local servicemen who died in the two World Wars
- Unveiled: 1921
- Location: 51.4112°N 0.3113°W; Hampton Court Road, Hampton Wick, near Kingston Bridge, London
- PARISH OF HAMPTON WICK 1914–1918 TO THE GLORY OF GOD AND IN MEMORY OF THOSE BRAVE MEN OF THIS PARISH WHO GAVE THEIR LIVES FOR THEIR COUNTRY 1939–1945

Listed Building – Grade II
- Official name: Hampton Wick War Memorial
- Designated: 19 November 2015
- Reference no.: 1430664

The Hampton Wick War Memorial in the London Borough of Richmond upon Thames is situated on the Hampton Wick side of Kingston Bridge, between the bridge and the entrance to Home Park. Several dozen casualties of both world wars are commemorated. Most of these men will have been lost or buried abroad, but a few are buried in the London area. The memorial has been Grade II listed since 2015.

The Hampton Wick War Memorial was unveiled on 3 May 1921, commemorating 47 local servicemen who died during the First World War. In 1933 the memorial was floodlit using gas from the Hampton Wick Gas Company. Following the Second World War a further 17 names were added to commemorate those who fell during that conflict.

== Some World War I casualties ==
Cecil Howard Sivers – 12th Bristol Battalion, the Gloucestershire Regiment. June 1899 to 23 August 1918, died at Pas de Calais, France, burial at Queen's Cemetery, Bucquoy. Son of Robert and Ethel of 27 Lower Teddington Road, now home to a religious order.

Walter Henry Martin – Sergeant, RAF. Son of Mrs Hickman and husband of Edith L. Stripp (formerly Martin). Airman in training, he died on 6 November 1918, five days before the Armistice and his squadron never entered active service. He is buried at Chingford, Essex, the home of his squadron.

Henry John Doe – 1st Battalion, East Surrey Regiment. April 1895 to 20 July 1916, buried at Serre Rd No 2 Cemetery.

== Some World War II casualties ==
Derek William Eves – Flying Officer, RAFVR, 196 Squadron, Special Operations Pilot, Special Air Service (SAS), operating under the Special Operations Executive, separate from Bomber Command. 196 Squadron took part in the D-Day landings and the assault on Arnhem. It liaised with the French Resistance and carried the SAS and were specialists in low-level flying. He died on 9 November 1944, aged twenty, when he failed to return from Operation Draught 7A, over the Zuiderzee, Holland. He was the son of William and Ella Eves.

Leonard Roy Hebberd – D-Day glider pilot, Army Air Corps – SAS. He took part in the D-Day landings and died three days later, on 9 June 1944. He is buried near to Hampton Wick, at Teddington Cemetery, with his mother and father.

William Timothy Udale – Sergeant, RAFVR, 86 Squadron, Beaufort Fighter crew, engaged in coastal patrol. A member of the well-known Udale family, he died on 7 September 1941.

== See also ==
- List of public art in Richmond upon Thames
