= Odeon Cinema, Richmond =

Cinema in Richmond upon Thames, London, England

Odeon Cinema
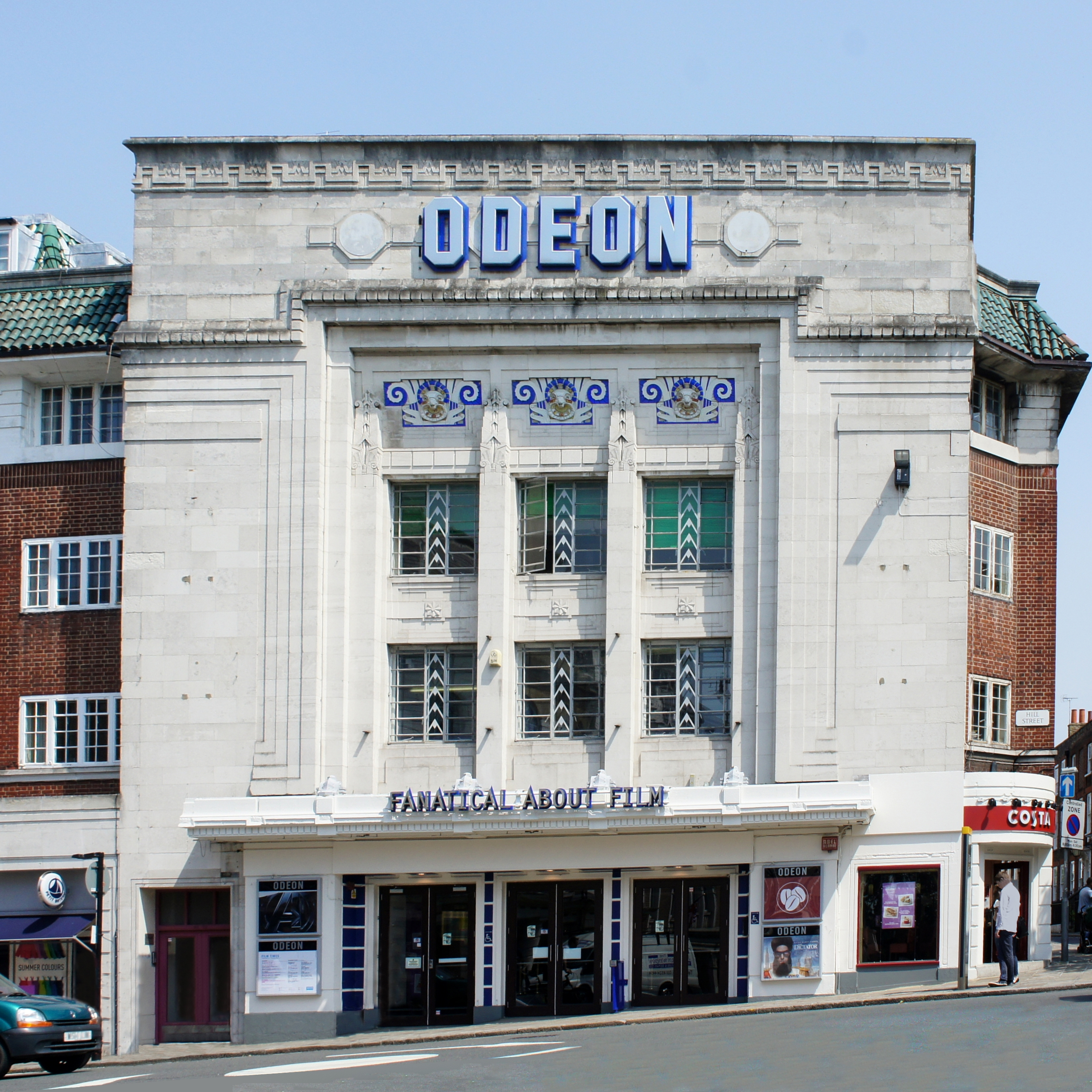

General information
- Architectural style: Art Deco
- Location: Richmond, London
- Address: 72 Hill Street; Richmond TW9 1TW
- Country: England
- Coordinates: 51°27′30.280″N 0°18′18.565″W grid reference TQ 17847 74632
- Opened: 1930

Website
- www.odeon.co.uk/cinemas/richmond/

The Odeon Cinema, originally the Richmond Kinema, is a multiplex cinema in Richmond, London, England. Opened in 1930, it is noted for its Art Deco style. It is a Grade II listed building.

== History and description ==
The cinema was designed by Julian Leathart and W. R. Grainger for Joseph Mears Theatres Ltd, and was opened on 21 April 1930, as the Richmond Kinema. It seated 1,533, in stalls and circle levels. It was also a theatre, with stage and dressing rooms, which have survived.

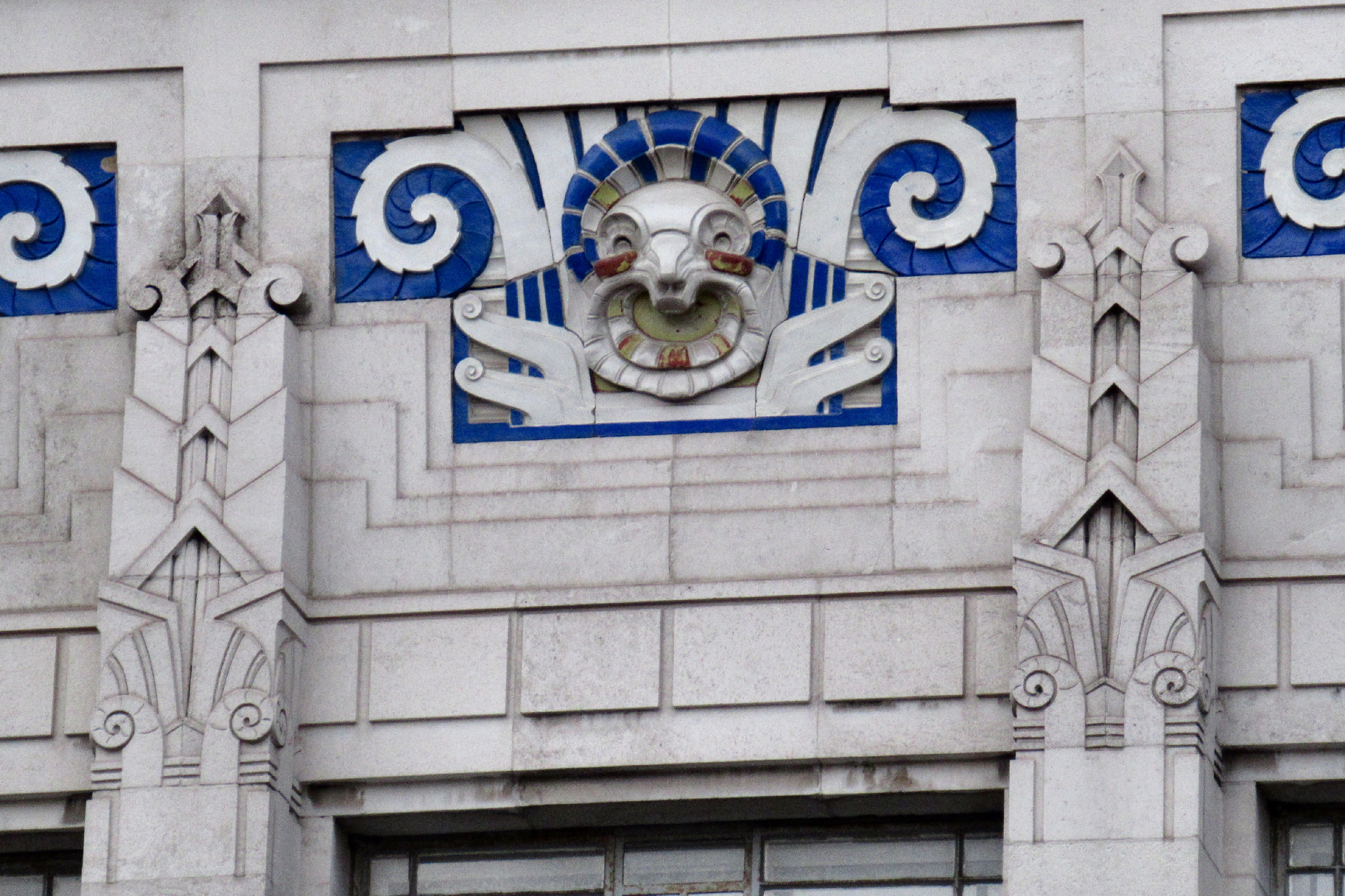
Detail of façade: lion mask within Ionic capital

The building has a steel frame clad in brick. The façade, faced with faience, is in neo-Egyptian-influenced Art Deco style. Above the entrance, there are windows with Art Deco chevrons in the metal glazing; above these are Ionic capitals featuring lion masks.

In 1944 it was taken over by Odeon Cinemas, and renamed the Odeon. Three screens were installed in 1972: screen 1 in the former circle, and screens 2 and 3 below the circle. Screen 1 retains the atmosphere of the original auditorium, evoking a 17th-century Spanish courtyard: there is elaborate grillwork, loggias and steeped pitched roofs with Spanish pantiles to the sides. The listing text comments that it is "One of only three surviving 'atmospheric' interiors in Britain, the others being The Academy, Brixton, and The Rainbow Theatre, Finsbury Park."

Screens 4 to 7 of Odeon Richmond are in a separate building on Red Lion Street, a former billiard hall which opened as Odeon Studios in 1992.
