= Emily Allchurch =

British artist

Emily Allchurch (born 1974) is a British artist who is known for using digital photography and lightbox art to create new works based on masterpieces of world art.

== Career ==
Allchurch was born in Jersey, a town in the Channel Islands of the United Kingdom. After graduating from the Kent Institute of Art & Design and the Royal College of Art, London (in sculpture), Allchurch initially used digital editing for emphasizing effects in a singular work. Allchurch specializes in using a variety of contemporary photographs to create a cohesive image of an imaginary place. She has created a multitude of artistic series that create a new contemporary life in classic paintings, or imagined landscapes. By taking a template of the original image, Allchurch digitally superimposes her own photographs to recreate the original work.

=== Settings ===
By 2003, she began to graph many photographs of Old Master artworks into a new collage, for example, her Settings, a series of thirteen works. Allchurch cites Settings as “the start of a photographic journey,” in which photographs put a contemporary twist on a traditional landscape. Settings is a series of 12 reimagined architectural works of the European Old Masters, and was in progress from 2003 to 2006. Allchurch combined photographs from suburban London in order to create collages of these architectural works. Her mastery in lightbox-effects creates the illusion that the combined images are one. Although all of the inspired architecture is from the past, Allchurch kept modern details from the photos—like graffiti, signs and litter—to create a contemporary tone.

=== Urban Chiaroscuro ===
Allchurch's 2007 work, Urban Chiaroscuro, further established her reputation as a critically acclaimed artist. Urban Chiaroscuro, which was influenced by Giovanni Battista Piranesi, used photographs of brick, stone, as well as contemporary themes such as graffiti, security cameras, advertisements, and mirrors, to recreate a new 3-dimensional version of his etchings of prison scenes. Urban chiaroscuro is Allchurch's own social commentary on the cold, almost claustrophobic conditions of the prison systems. Some find her work similar to the scenes found in video games.

=== Tokyo Story ===
Showcasing her technique of using photographs of contemporary scenes to imitate and redefine classic works, the Tokyo Story(2009) series uses Hiroshige's ukiyo-e wood-block prints of One Hundred Views of Edo to reinterpret and update his work within a contemporary setting. Allchurch was inspired by the natural beauty of Hiroshige's work and was compelled to re-imagine the landscape with a contemporary tone. The modern elements such as billboards, advertisements and litter are meant to create the illusion that the audience is viewing the old landscape in modern times. Allchurch combined her photographs with her template method. She explained: "Using the original image as my map and guide, I source and photograph buildings and landscapes, which I use to recreate the scene from a contemporary perspective. Many hundreds of photographs are [for] each image."

=== Tower of Babel ===
The Towers of Babel series (2017) features a variety of unique buildings in various cultures. The series was inspired by the Old Testament Biblical story of the Tower of Babel (from the book of Genesis), which depicts a tower that the Babylonians built in an attempt to reach Heaven. There have been numerous artistic interpretations of the Tower of Babel, and in 2017, Allchurch contributed her own interpretation of the famous tower. Through her photo collage technique, Allchurch combined thousands of photographs to depict the Towers of Babel as if it were built in the 21st century. The variation of advertisements, construction vehicles and other contemporary details creates a modern feel. Each image in the series features a different culture, from London to Hong Kong.

== Collections ==
Allchurch's works are held by various private collectors and a complete set of her Tokyo Story series is held at the Minneapolis Institute of Art. 1n 2015 Manchester Art Gallery commissioned Allchurch to make a large image of the city's Albert Square based on a 1910 painting of the same location by Adolphe Valette. The Manchester commission became her first solo feature in a public museum. In 2018 Allchurch showed three works inspired by paintings in the collection of the Sir John Soane's Museum at the Museum in London.
