= Statue of Virginia Woolf =

Statue in Richmond upon Thames, London

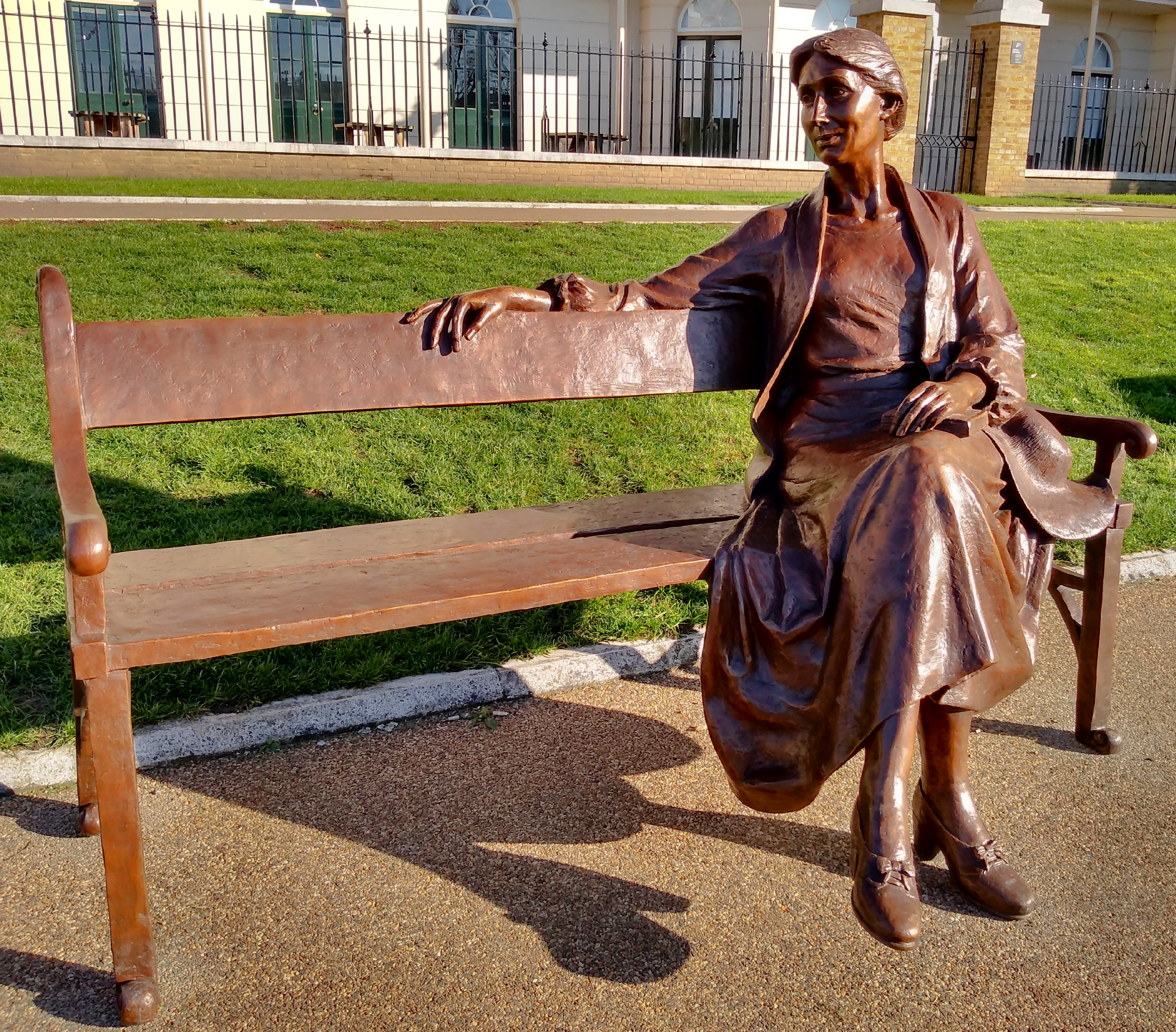
- The statue in 2022
- Location: 51.4581°N 0.3066°W

A statue of Virginia Woolf (1882–1941), one of the most influential 20th-century modernist authors, sits overlooking the Thames at Richmond Riverside in London, England. It was sculpted by Laury Dizengremel and erected in November 2022.

== Location ==
The statue stands in Richmond, where she and her husband Leonard established the publishing house Hogarth Press, named after Hogarth House where they lived. Cheryl Robson, a fundraiser for the statue, mentioned that Woolf's diaries suggested she would frequently enjoy the views from the banks of the Thames around Richmond.

In November 2021, the statue's position created some controversy in relation to the nature of Woolf's death, as she had committed suicide by drowning in a river.
