= RSPCA Fountain =

Monument in Richmond, London

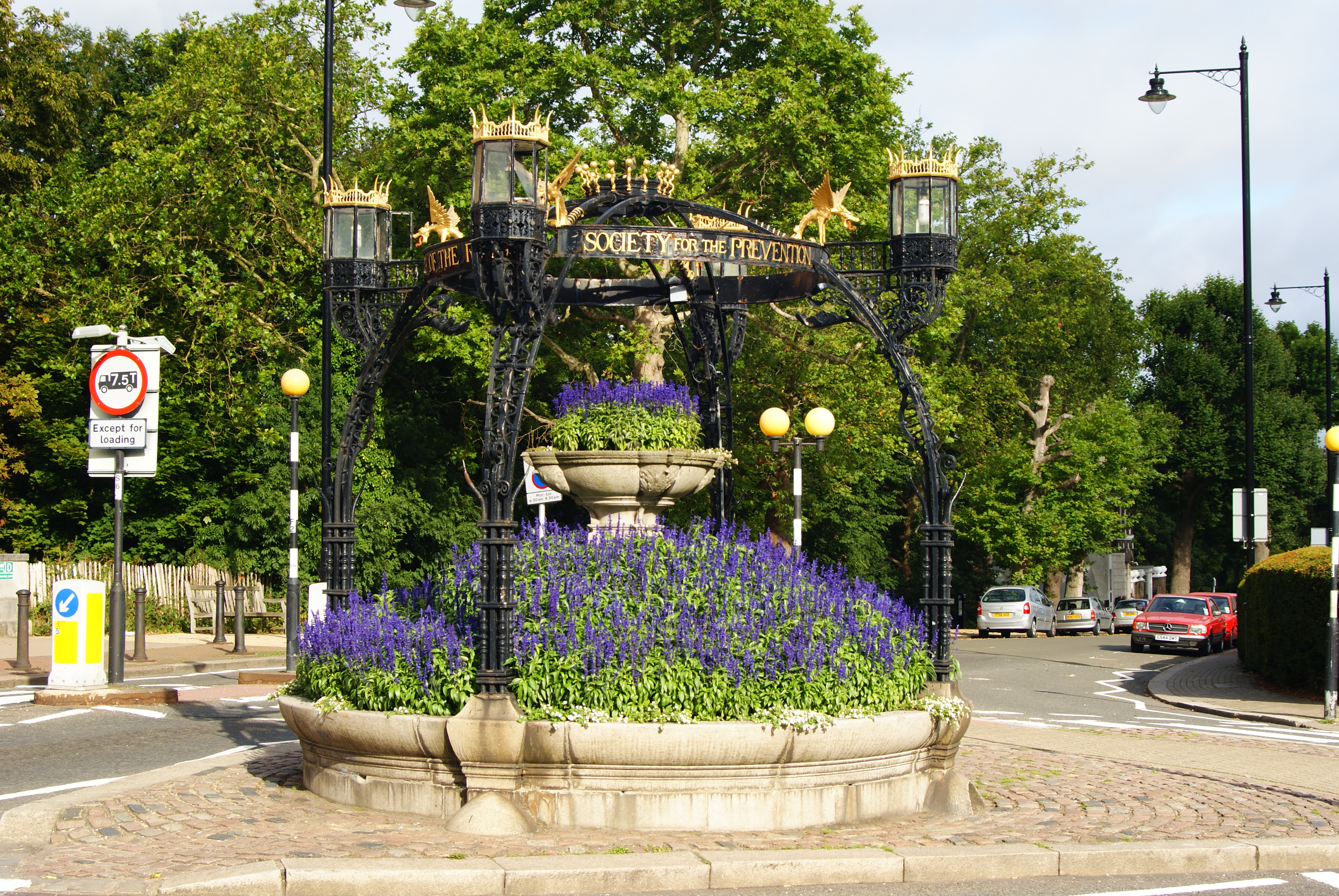
- The RSPCA Fountain
- Interactive map of the RSPCA Fountain area

General information
- Location: Richmond, London, England
- Coordinates: 51.4507°N 0.2968°W

Design and construction
- Architect: T. E. Collcutt

Listed Building – Grade II
- Official name: Cattle Fountain Outside the Star and Garter Home
- Designated: 10 January 1950
- Reference no.: 1263512

The RSPCA Fountain is a monument on Richmond Hill in London dedicated to the prevention of cruelty to animals. It was designed by Thomas Edward Collcutt and completed in 1901.

The monument is Grade II listed, being designed in 1891 as a memorial to the work of a local branch of the RSPCA. Originally it served as a drinking fountain for local working animals as well as having a trough for dogs to drink from. Due to this function it was originally known as "cattle fountain" as reflected in its designation. In 2020, elements of the fountain were removed and in 2024, the monument sustained damage after a car crashed into it.
