= Mortlake and East Sheen War Memorial =

War memorial in London

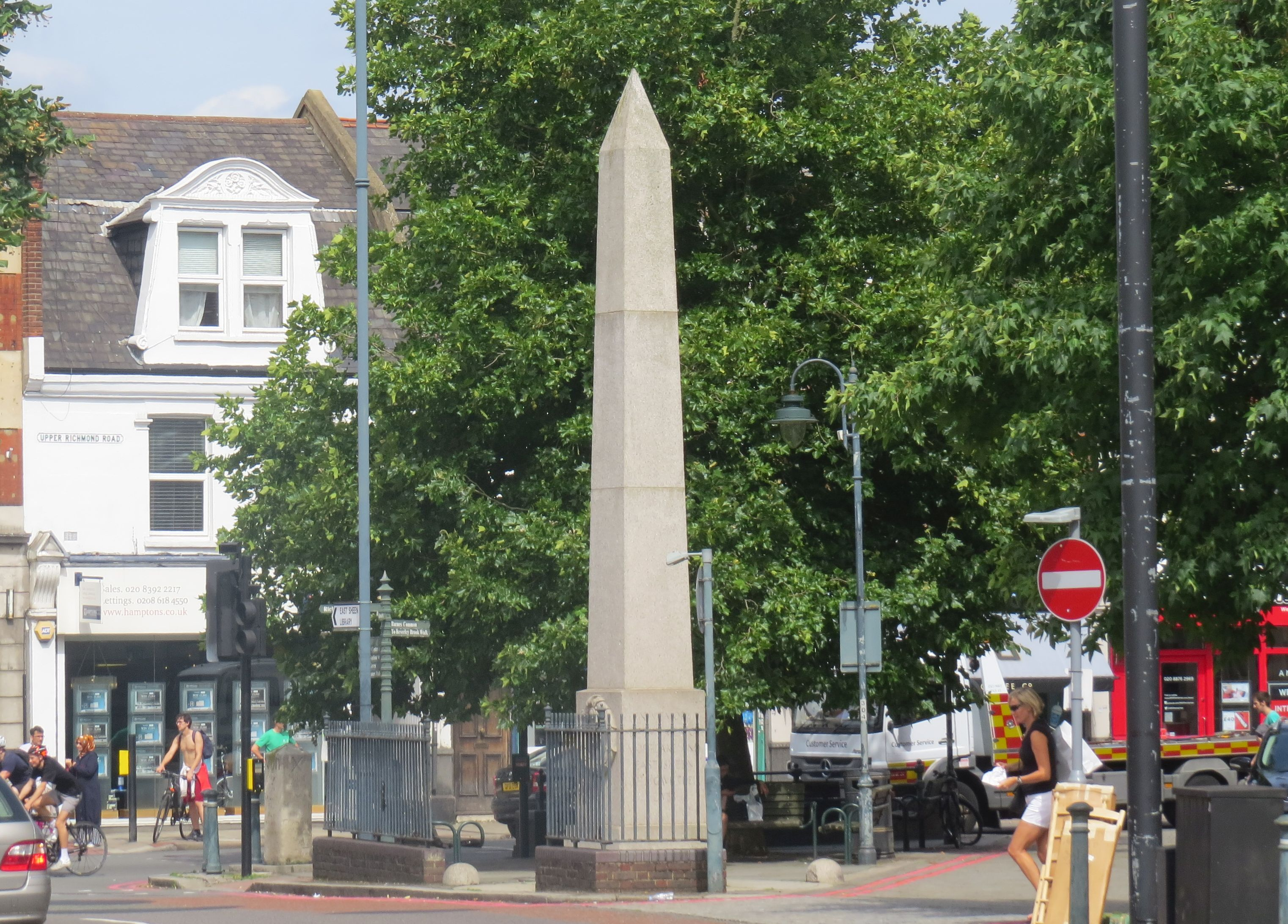
- The memorial as viewed from southern approach on Sheen Lane

General information
- Type: War memorial
- Location: East Sheen, London, England
- Coordinates: 51.4646°N 0.26661°W
- Year built: 1925

Listed Building – Grade II
- Official name: Mortlake and East Sheen War Memorial
- Designated: 29 June 2017
- Reference no.: 1445722

Mortlake and East Sheen War Memorial is a war memorial in East Sheen, London, commemorating the local residents who died fighting in the First and Second World Wars. The memorial stands on The Triangle, a traffic island on the junction between the Upper Richmond Road and Sheen Lane. It acts as the site of Remembrance Day services for East Sheen.

The memorial was listed Grade II on the National Heritage List for England in 2017 for both its design and its historical significance; it stands next to a Portland stone milestone from 1751 which is also listed. The memorial was unveiled in 1925, during a period of unprecedented monument building following the First World War which coincided with the ongoing development and urbanisation of East Sheen and Mortlake.

== Description ==
The memorial is a granite obelisk designed by Albert Myers, surrounded by a circular paving. All four faces bear inscriptions. The east and west faces have laurel wreaths in high relief above inscriptions "THE GLORIOUS DEAD" and "THEIR NAMES LIVETH FOR EVERMORE". The north face originally read "THE GREAT WAR / MCMXIV / MCMXVIII" but now reads "WARS / 1914–18 / 1939–45". The south (front) face reads "IN MEMORY OF / THE MEN OF / MORTLAKE /AND EAST SHEEN / WHO GAVE THEIR LIVES" and below "THE ROLL OF HONOUR / LIES BENEATH THE SWORD" beneath which is a sword incised in the flagstone which the roll of honour is buried yet beneath.
