= Richmond Riverside =

Development in Richmond, London

Coordinates: 51.4583°N 0.3068°W

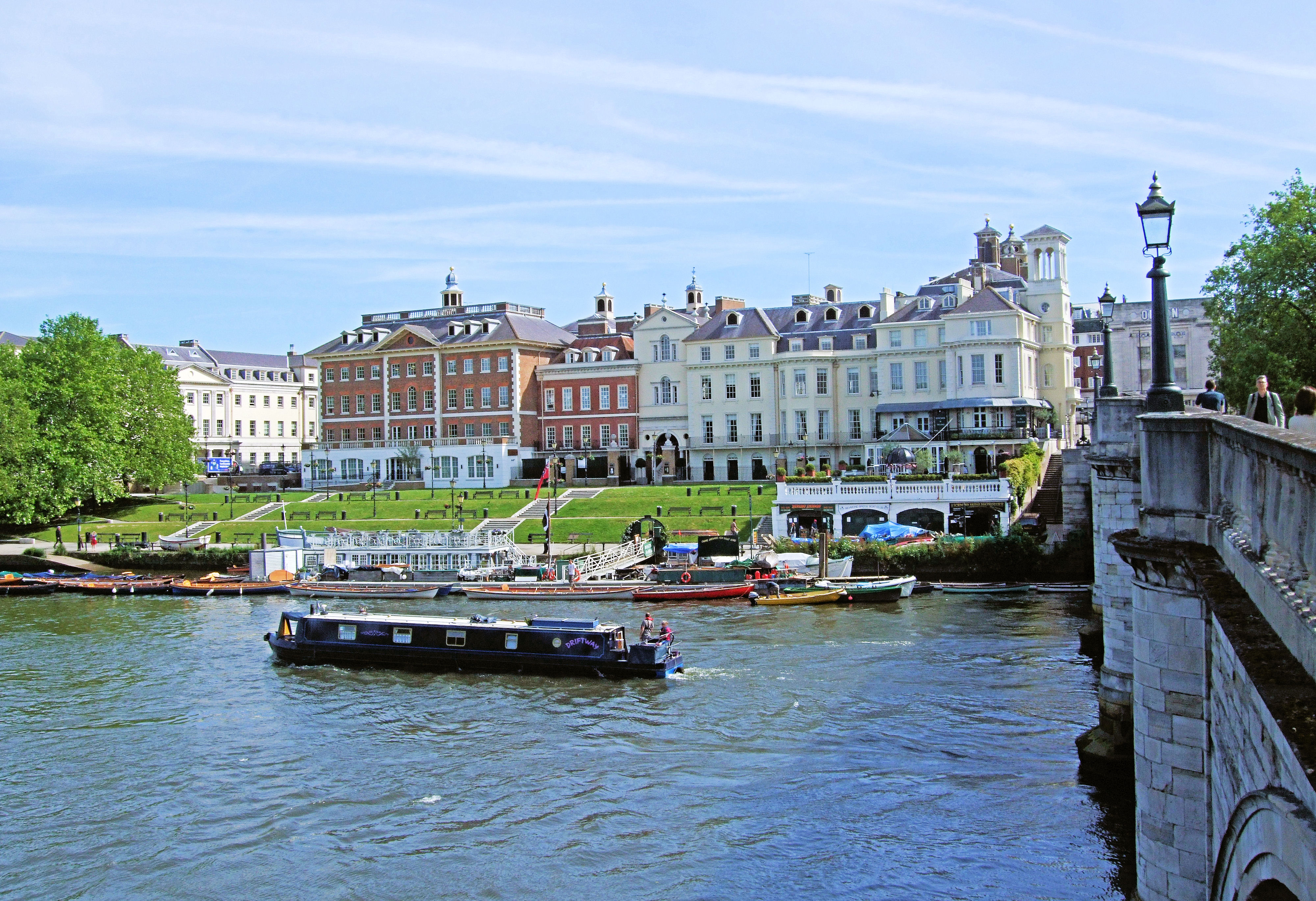
Richmond Riverside as viewed from across Richmond Bridge

Richmond Riverside is a development of the riverfront of Richmond, London, England, designed by Quinlan Terry and completed and unveiled by Queen Elizabeth II in 1988. The site is bounded roughly by the Thames on the west, Hill Street on the east, Richmond Bridge and Richmond Road to the south, and Water Lane to the north.

== Architecture ==
In Terry's typical approach, the development aims to use traditionalist styles and appear congruous with its surrounding context, although Richmond Riverside has been noted for its eclecticism. It, along with many of Quinlan Terry's other works, has been considered controversial particularly among architectural circles. Criticisms are said to arise from both modernists and traditionalists alike for what they consider poorly executed pastiche. Proponents on the other hand believe the less strict reliance on the rules of classical architecture allow Terry to create more playful designs that remain pleasant. Into the 21st century it has largely been considered to be widely appreciated by the general public. Those in support of Terry have noted the development as an exceptional proof of concept in being successful in attracting corporate tenants as well as providing a space appreciated by the public. It has also been cited as an example of an expression of the tenets as laid out by the Prince of Wales, now Charles III, in A Vision of Britain: A Personal View of Architecture.

=== Arrangement ===
The development includes terraced lawns on the riverfront as well as new buildings in Georgian styles, including Hotham House, which were built in and around two existing listed buildings. It includes Heron Square where the Duck Pond Market is held every weekend. The buildings host offices, shops and residential units. In February 2022 there were plans to alter one of the buildings for a sister location of Scott's in Mayfair, which were opposed by Terry. in November of that year, a sculpture of Virginia Woolf sitting on a bench was installed overlooking the river.

A model of the development is held in the town hall which the site surrounds.

== Governance ==
Richmond Riverside is part of the Richmond Park constituency for elections to the House of Commons of the United Kingdom. It is part of the Ham, Petersham and Richmond Riverside ward for elections to Richmond upon Thames London Borough Council.

== Awards ==
Awards received by the development include:

- 2008 – Philippe Rotthier Prix European d'Architecture for Urban Design
- 1990 – Johnnie Walker Architectural Award
- 1990 – Brick Development Association for Quality Brickwork
- 1989 – The Carpenters Award for Design and Joinery Work
- 1988 – The Richmond Society
- 1988 – The Richmond Society for New Housing in Water Lane
- 1988 – The Richmond Society for Landscaped Open Space for the Public
- 1988 – The Richmond Society for Heron Court Layout
- 1988 – The Richmond Society for The Restaurant Building on the Waterfront
- 1988 – The Richmond Society for Rehabilitation and Conservation of Tower House, Bridge Street.
