= Diana Fountain, Bushy Park =

Sculptural fountain in Bushy Park, London, England

Coordinates: 51.40992°N 0.33619°W

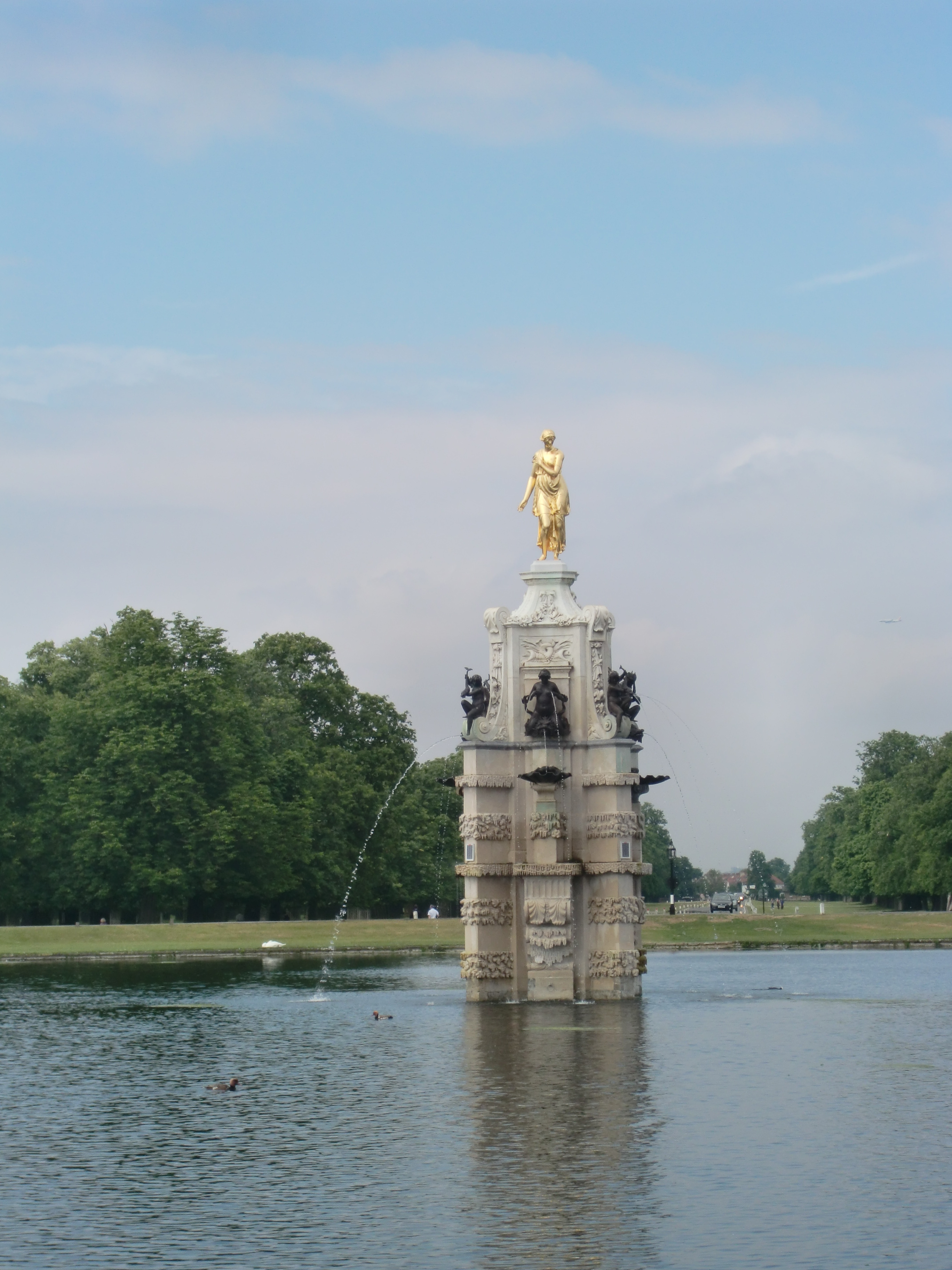
- The fountain viewed from the Hampton Court side
- Interactive map of the Diana Fountain, Bushy Park area

General information
- Type: Fountain
- Location: Bushy Park, London Borough of Richmond upon Thames, England, United Kingdom

Design and construction
- Designations: Grade I

Listed Building – Grade I
- Official name: Arethusa or 'Diana' Fountain
- Designated: 2 September 1952; reclassified 25 February 2011
- Reference no.: 1080871

The Diana Fountain in Bushy Park, in the London Borough of Richmond upon Thames, England, is a seventeenth-century statue ensemble and water feature in an eighteenth-century setting with a surrounding pool and mile long tree lined vistas which honors the Roman Goddess Diana. Originally created for Somerset House in the 1630s, and remodelled about 1690, the fountain has stood since 1713 in Bushy Park, and now forms a large traffic island in Chestnut Avenue.

It is the focal point of two major vistas designed by Sir Christopher Wren, including Chestnut Avenue which is the ceremonial landward approach to Hampton Court Palace. The traffic island is circular and contains a 400-foot (120 m) diameter pool surrounded by lawns, with the Diana statue on a tall base in the middle of the pool. The fountain was listed as Grade II in 1952 and in 2011 reclassified as Grade I.

== History ==
The bronze sculptures were originally commissioned by Charles I for Queen Henrietta Maria's garden at Somerset House in central London. The original design for the fountain was apparently by Inigo Jones, whose sketch drawing survives at Chatsworth House, showing figures recognisably the same as those in place today, but in a different arrangement and in a different stonework setting. The Somerset House base was lower, and the surrounding pool much smaller, enabling a much closer view of the figures than is possible today. The central figure is naked in the drawing, and parts of the design are closely copied from engravings of earlier fountains in Bologna and Augsburg.

The execution of the gilt statue which forms the pinnacle of the tableaux has been attributed to Hubert Le Sueur, and related to payments to him from the king. The other metal sculptures, which are still ungilded, have been attributed to his rival Francesco Fanelli, and also to Le Sueur; a mention by John Evelyn in 1662 gave the whole fountain to Fanelli, but most historians follow the Royal Parks in preferring the documented involvement of Le Sueur. Preparation of the site had begun in 1633–34, and Le Sueur was given what appears to be his final payment after completion in 1637; Nicholas Stone was also paid for work on the stone elements, which were in black marble. In the original arrangement, recorded in a drawing of perhaps the 1670s, the figures of the boys, now on the corners, were higher up, at a level between the central female figure above and the sea-monsters carrying women below, and the scallop shells were on the corners, level with the breasts of the four female figures, catching water spouting from the fish held by the boys.

During the English Commonwealth Oliver Cromwell had the fountain relocated to the privy garden at Hampton Court Palace, where this and other such works were not popular with all his supporters; he was urged by a Mrs Nethaway to "Demolish these monsters that are set up as ornaments". It is in an inventory of 1659 that the central figure is first called "Arethusa". After 1689 William III and Mary II commissioned Sir Christopher Wren to rebuild and expand much of Hampton Court Palace, and this eventually included the creation of Chestnut Avenue with its centrepiece the Diana Fountain as the grand approach to the Palace crossing Bushy Park. Wren, supervising William Talman, completed this part of the project in 1713 during the reign of Queen Anne. The top, scrolled part of the current base, and so the current rearrangement of the figures, is by Edward Pierce, in about 1690, when the sculptures were still in the privy garden, although the fountain was removed from there and put in storage in 1701. The lower rusticated part, "disproportionately tall", was erected for the new site in Bushy Park, and the central figure was gilded, apparently for the first time, for its re-erection.

The female figure on top of the fountain "has over her long life been known as Diana, Arethusa, Venus and even Proserpina", and recently "some younger visitors" take her for Diana, Princess of Wales. The official view is now firmly that she represents Arethusa, although the fountain continues to be known as the "Diana Fountain", and dissident views are still held by some parties.

Charles I had the Longford River dug from the River Colne to Hampton Court Palace in order to power the palace water features, and in 1713 Sir Christopher Wren utilised this water to give the complex a set of gravity fed water spouts. In the 297 years after the statue was relocated to its current site in the park, many of the waterspouts became clogged and only four were functioning before the renovations of 2009/10.

During World War II the pool was drained and part of Chestnut Avenue was used for Camp Griffiss, the first headquarters of SHAEF and the base where D-Day was planned. The base closed in the 1950s and Chestnut Avenue was subsequently restored. The complex was renovated in 2010 and the main statue was re-gilded.

== Gallery ==
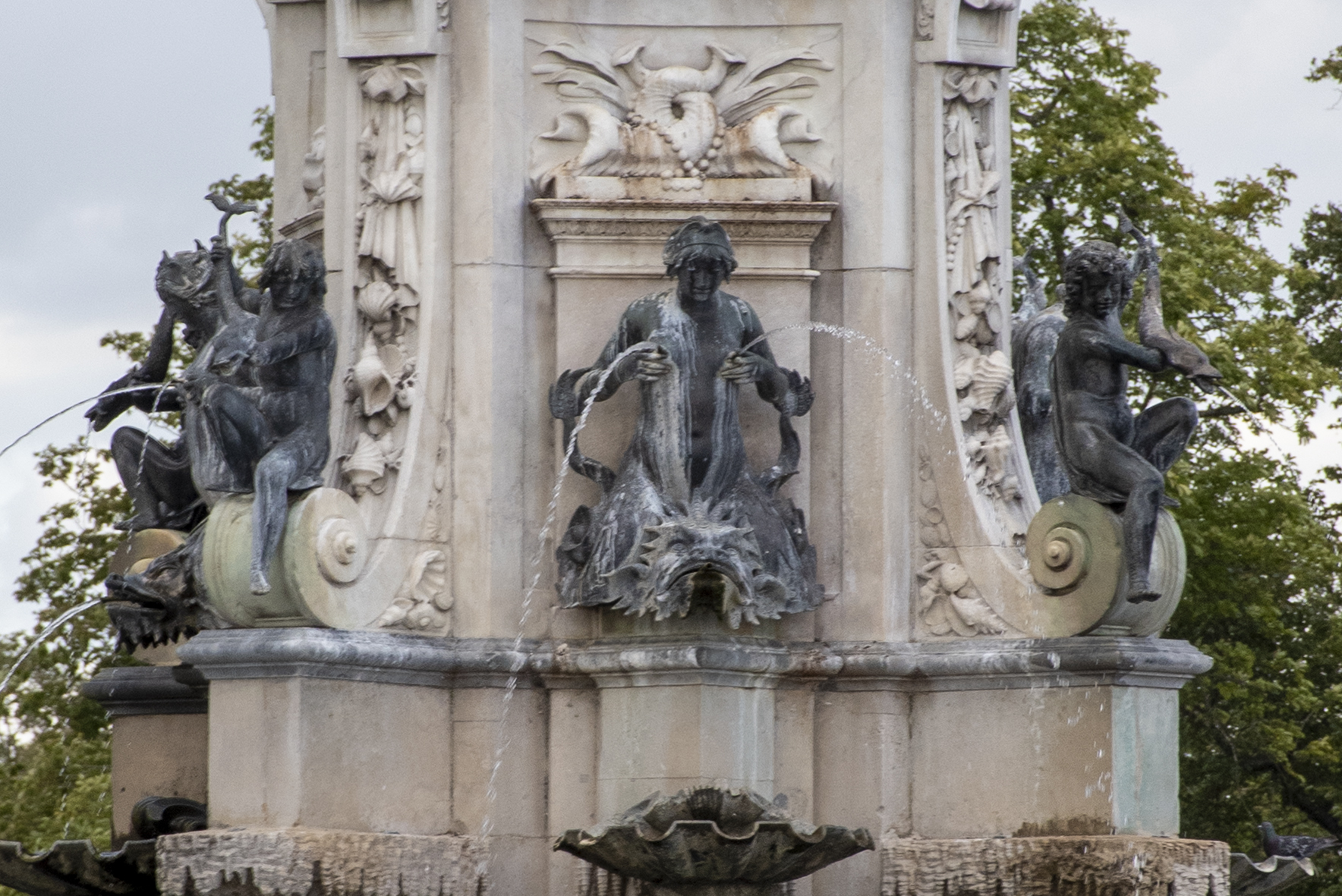
Close ups of nymphs showing the source of some of the waterjets

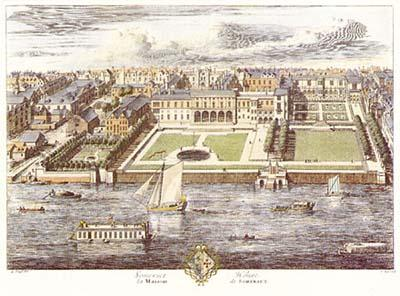
Somerset House and gardens in 1722, after the fountain had been moved

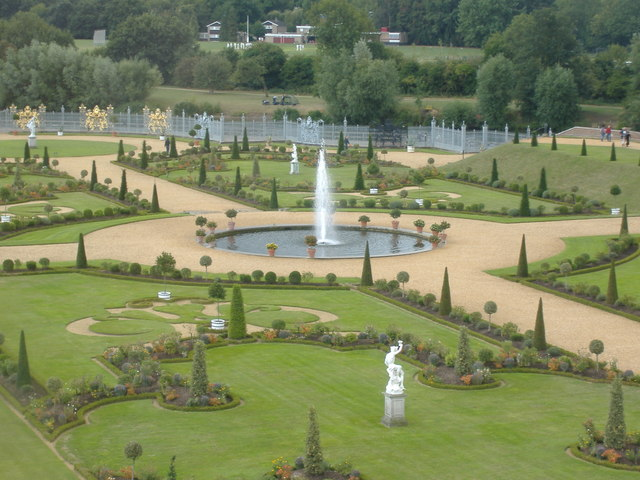
The Privy Garden, Hampton Court Palace

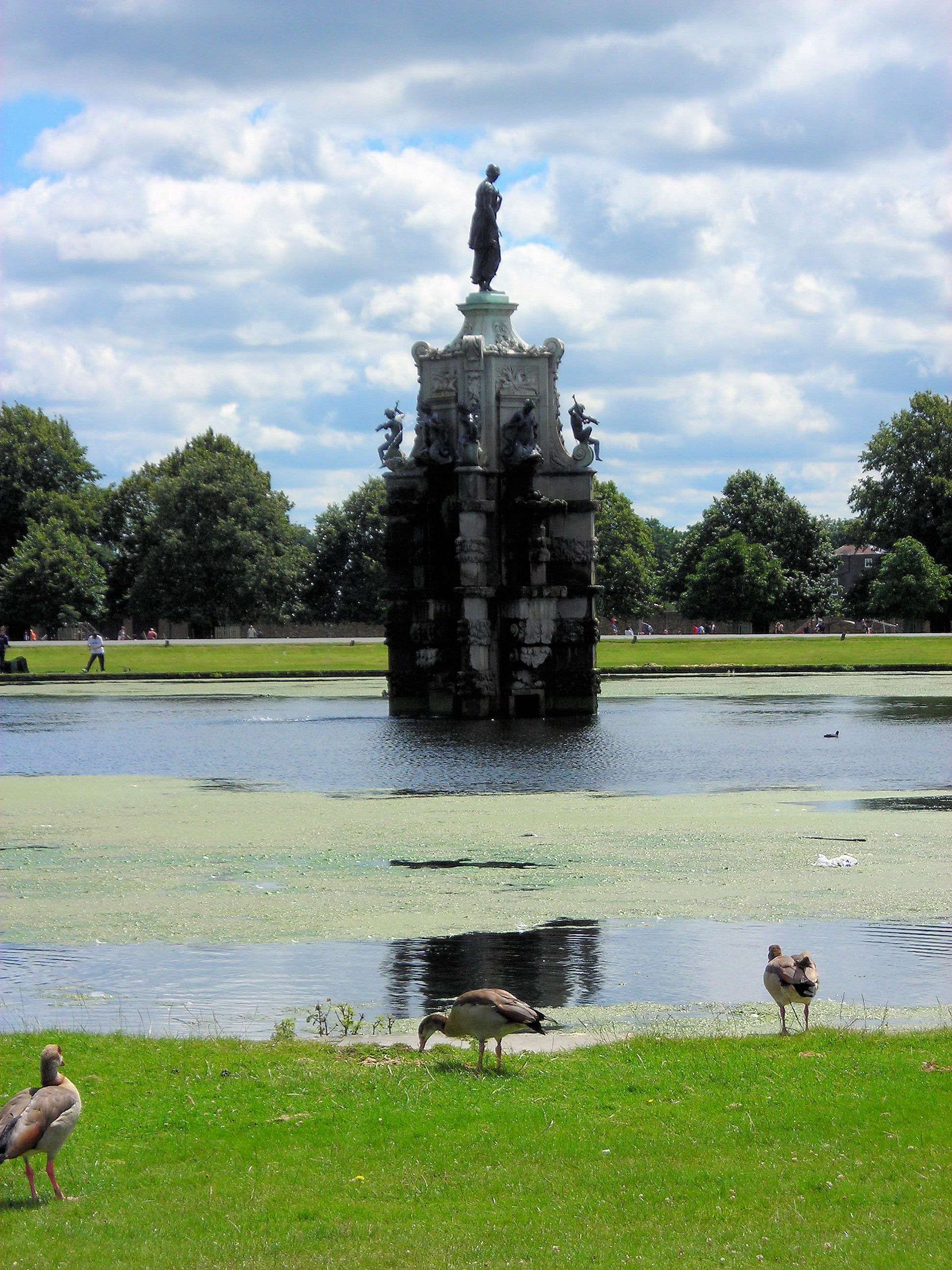
Prior to restoration, the central statue ungilded and most waterspouts were blocked

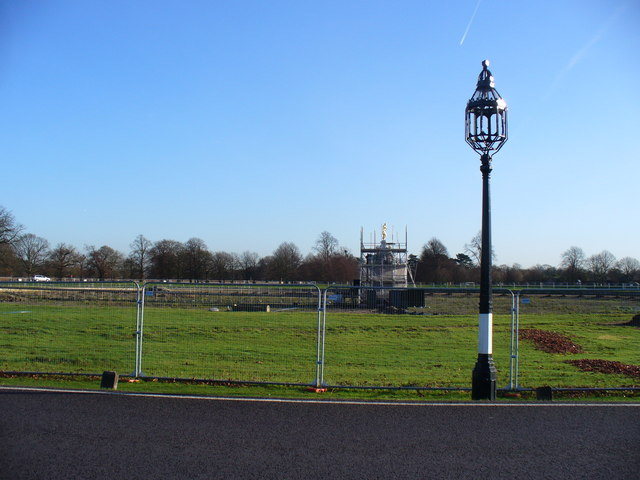
The pool was drained during the restoration

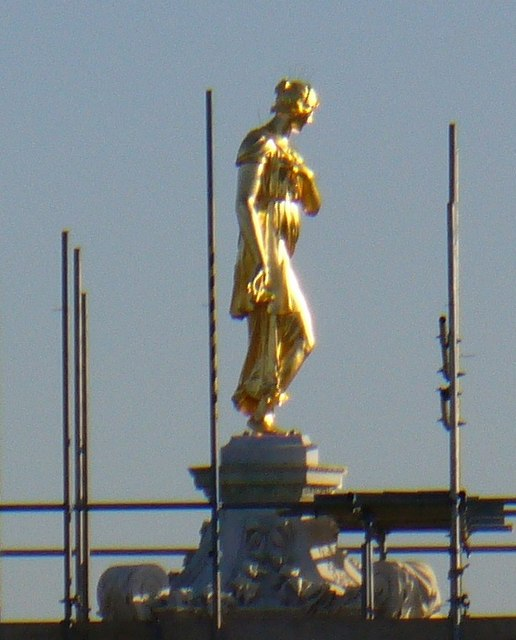
Diana being returned after restoration

== Vistas ==
The Diana Fountain is at the junction of two long straight tree lined avenues, Lime Avenue and Chestnut Avenue which cross at right angles. The Junction is off centre to both Avenues.

Chestnut Avenue

Chestnut Avenue crosses Bushy Park from Teddington to Hampton Court Palace and contains a road with wide lawns on both sides. There are multiple rows of horse chestnut trees on both sides of Chestnut Avenue.

Chestnut Avenue was created as the ceremonial approach to Hampton Court Palace and to this day still contains a road across the Park, though for the sake of the deer, motor vehicles are only allowed on it during daylight hours. It was part of the route for the men's road race cycling event at the 2012 Summer Olympics.

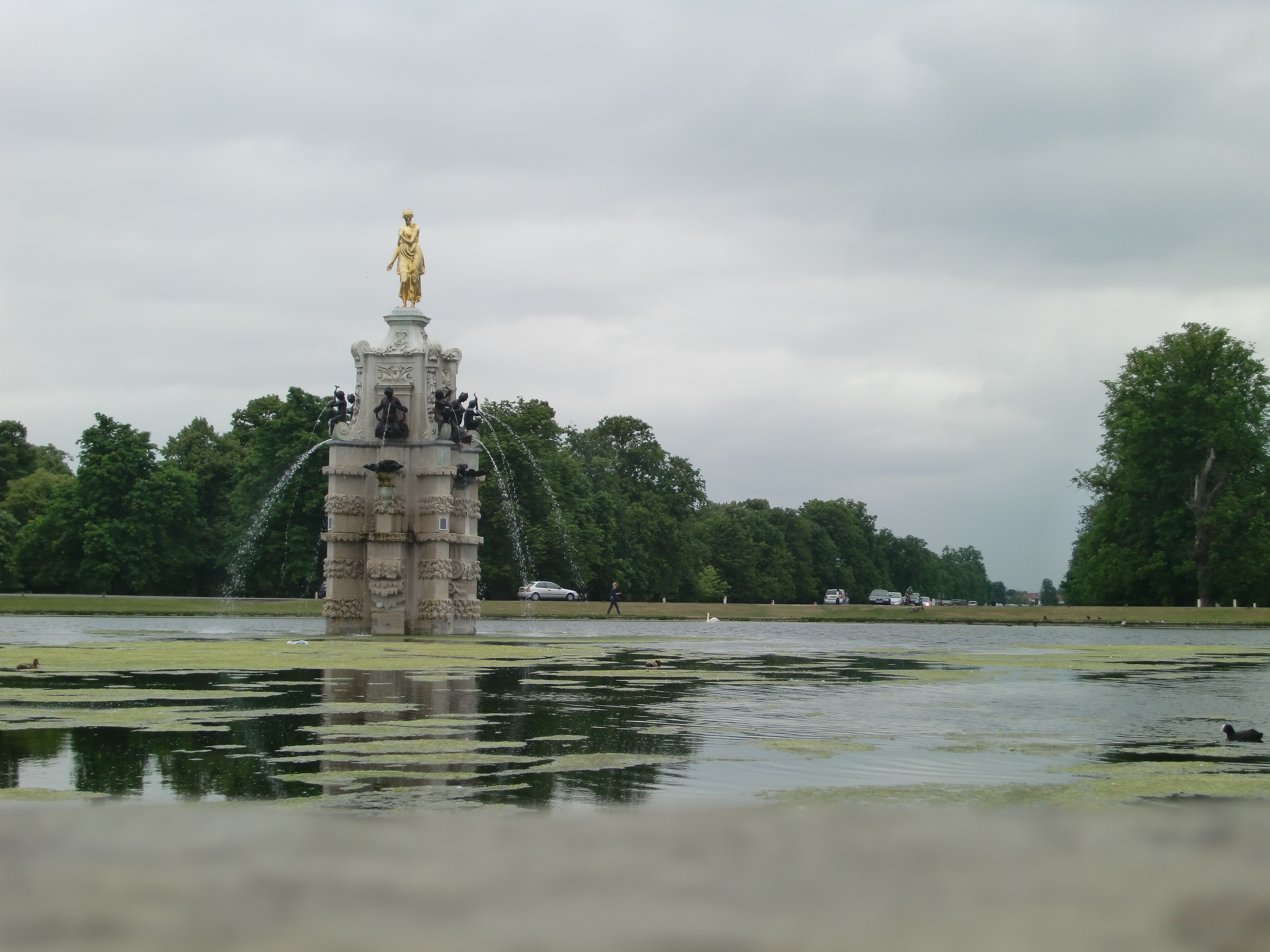
Diana with Chestnut Avenue behind

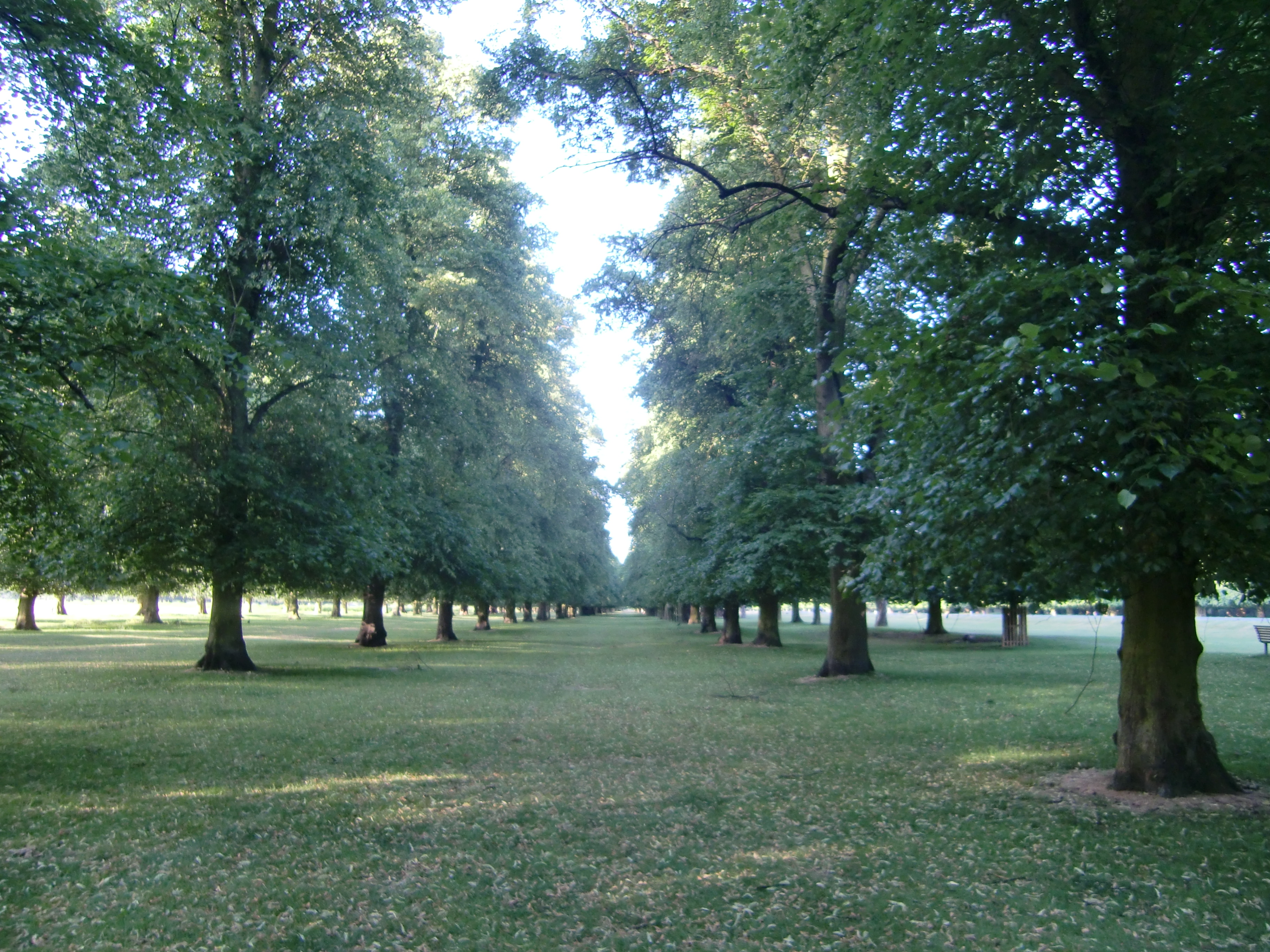
Detail shot of the rows of trees near the Teddington gate

Lime Avenue

Lime Avenue is grassed and has multiple rows of lime trees on both sides of it; the longer of its two sections runs between The Diana Fountain and White Lodge.

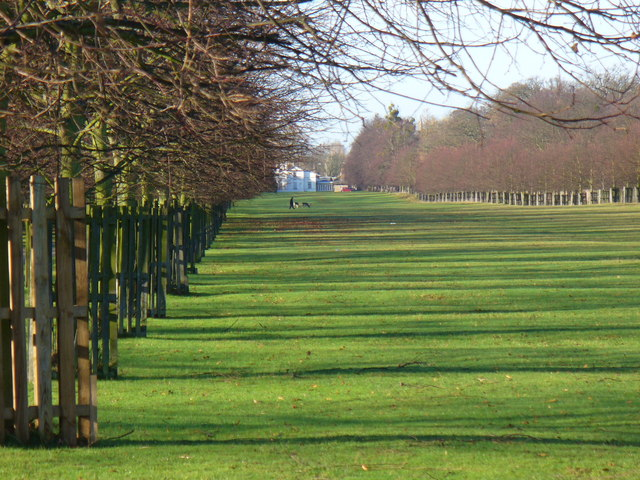
Lime Avenue looking towards White Lodge

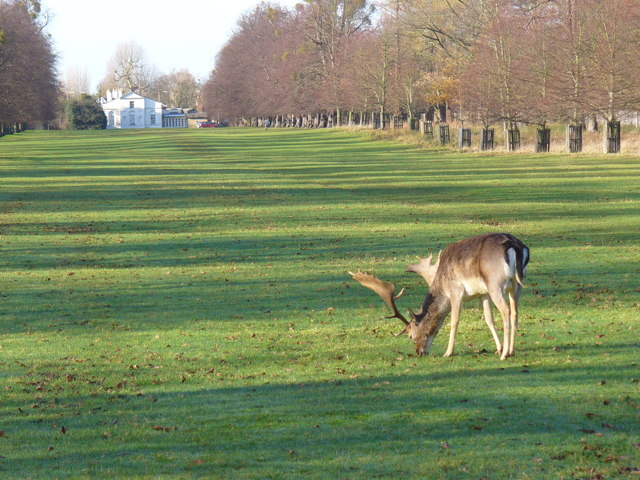
The avenues are grazed by herds of Fallow and Red deer

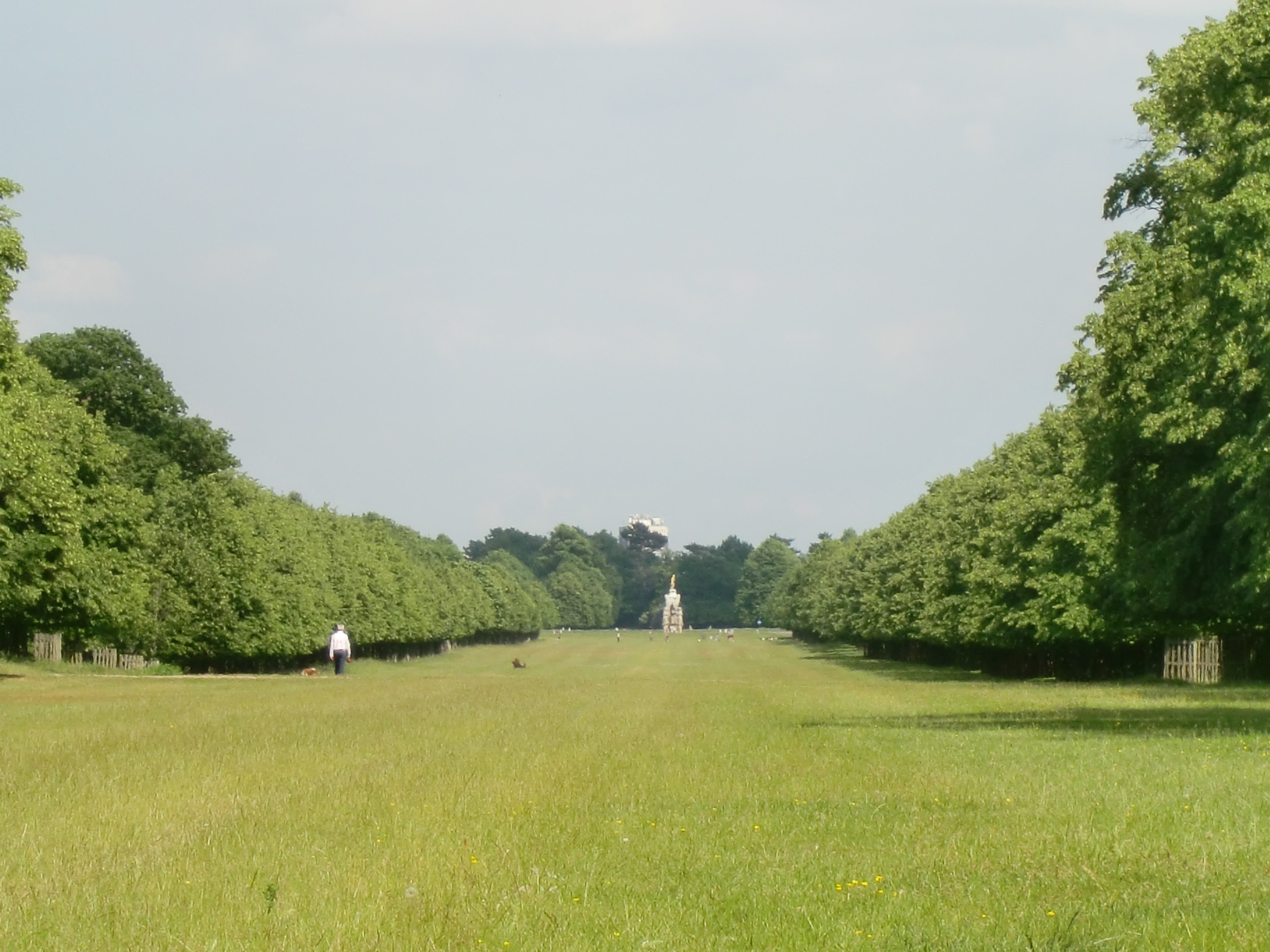
The Diana Fountain viewed along Lime Avenue

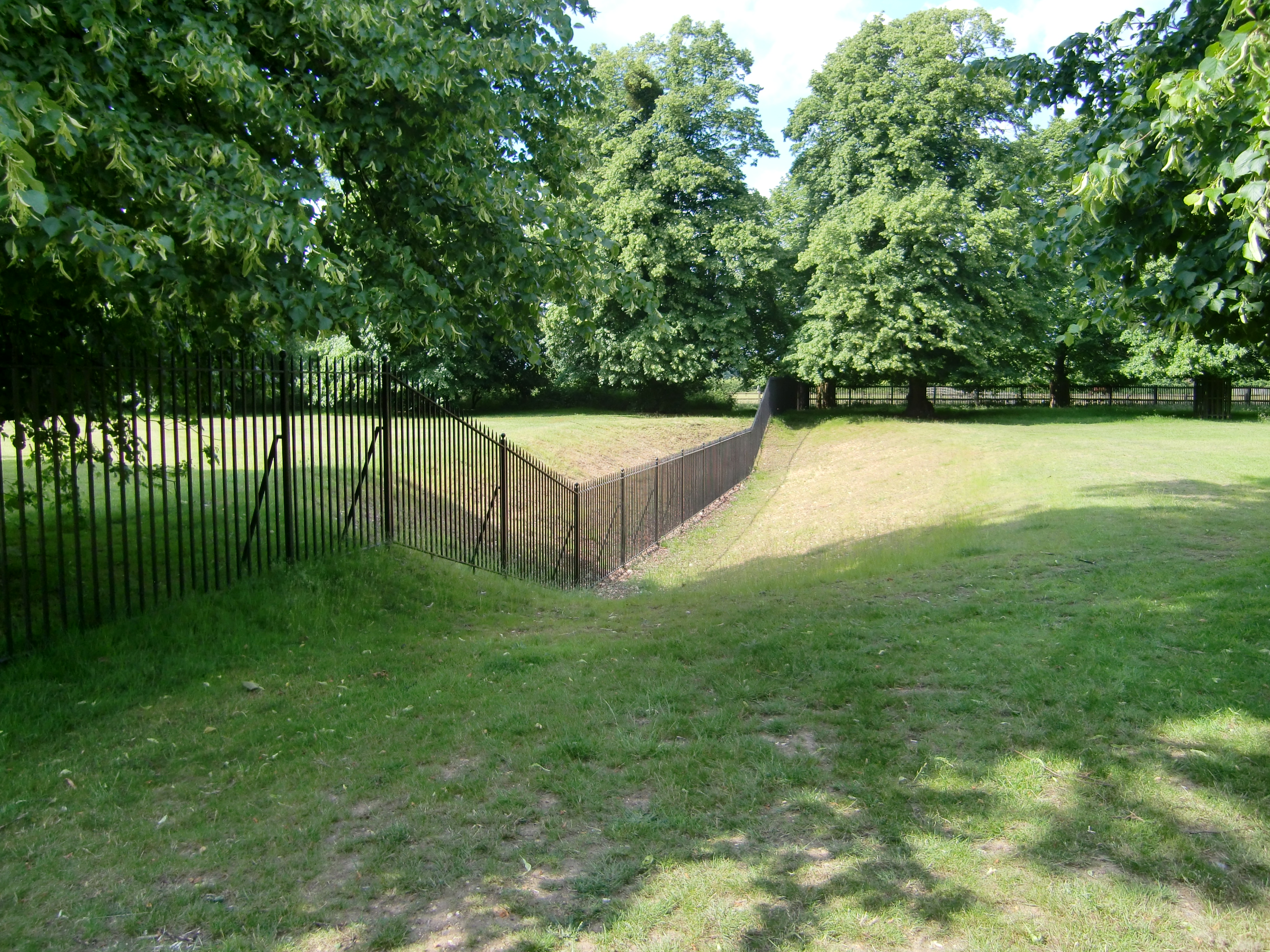
A Ha-ha at the White Lodge end of Lime Avenue keeps the deer in the park without interrupting the view from the Diana fountain

== See also ==
- List of public art in Richmond upon Thames

== Bibliography ==
- Fisher, Geoffrey and Newman, John. jstor "A fountain design by Inigo Jones", The Burlington Magazine, Vol. 127, No. 989 (Aug. 1985), pp. 530–533, retrieved 12 June 2010
- Harris, John. The Diana Fountain at Hampton Court, The Burlington Magazine, Vol. 111, No. 796 (Jul. 1969), pp. 444–449, Jstor
- Leapman, Michael. Inigo; The Life of Inigo Jones, The Architect of the English Renaissance, 2004, Headline, ISBN 0-7553-1003-9
- Little, Patrick. The Cromwellian Protectorate, Boydell Press, 2007, ISBN 1-84383-282-8, ISBN 978-1-84383-282-9
- Longstaffe-Gowan, Todd and Russell, Vivian. The gardens and parks at Hampton Court Palace, Frances Lincoln ltd, 2005, ISBN 0-7112-2368-8, ISBN 978-0-7112-2368-4, google books
- Worsley, Lucy and Souden, David, Hampton Court Palace, 2005, Historic Royal Palaces/Merrell, ISBN 1-85894-282-9
- Sheaf, John and Howe, Ken, Hampton and Teddington Past, 2000, Historical Publications Ltd, ISBN 0-948667-25-7
