= Bushy Park =

Public park in the London Borough of Richmond upon Thames

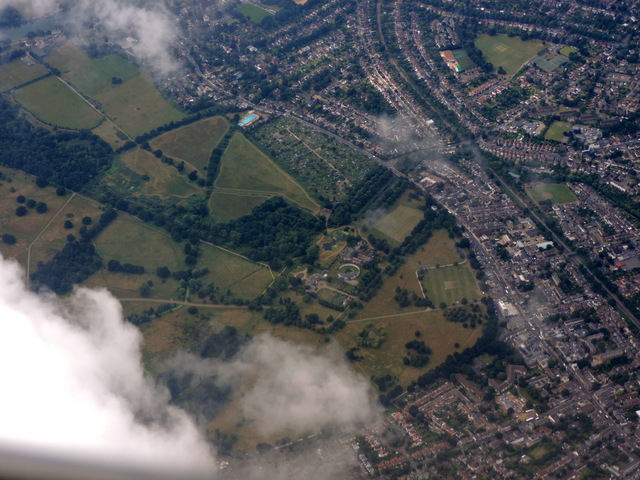
- Aerial view of Bushy Park

- Location within London Borough of Richmond upon Thames
- Type: Public Park
- Location: London, England
- Coordinates: 51°24′46″N 0°20′17″W
- Area: 445 hectares (1,100 acres)
- Created: 1529
- Operator: The Royal Parks
- Status: Open 24 hours year round except during the deer cull

National Register of Historic Parks and Gardens
- Official name: Bushy Park
- Designated: 1 October 1987
- Reference no.: 1000281
- Public transit: Hampton Court; Hampton Hampton Wick Teddington
- Website: https://www.royalparks.org.uk/parks/bushy-park

Bushy Park and Home Park (SSSI)
- Site of Special Scientific Interest
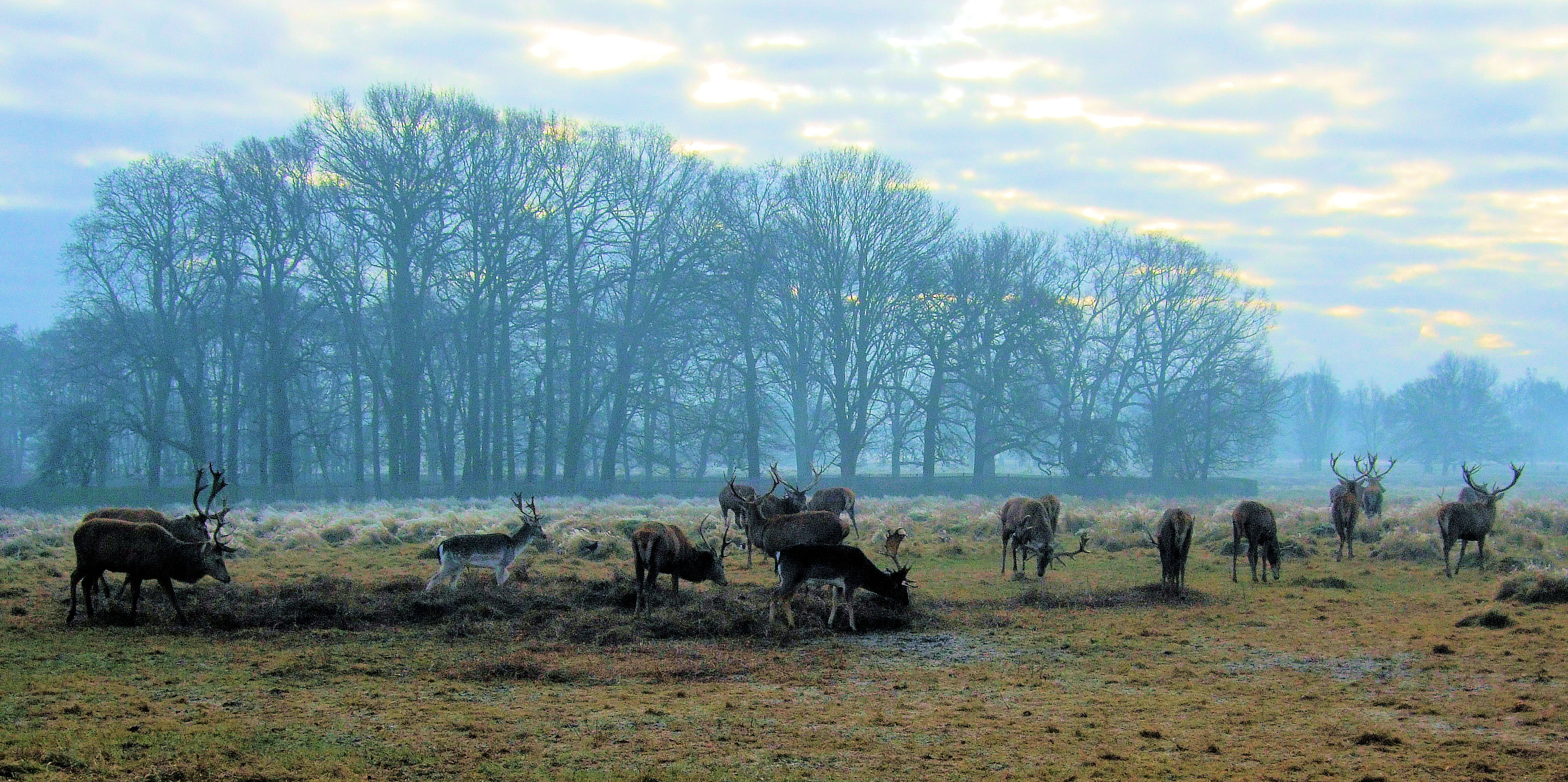
- Deer grazing in Bushy Park
- Location of Bushy Park and Home Park (SSSI).
- Area of search: Greater London
- Grid reference: TQ159692
- Interest: Biological
- Area: 540.39 hectares (1,335.3 acres)
- Notification date: 2014
- Location map: Magic Map

Bushy Park in the London Borough of Richmond upon Thames is the second largest of London's Royal Parks, at 445 hectares (1,100 acres) in area, after Richmond Park. The park, most of which is open to the public, is immediately north of Hampton Court Palace and Hampton Court Park and is a few minutes' walk from the west side of Kingston Bridge. It is surrounded by Teddington, Hampton, Hampton Hill and Hampton Wick and is mainly within the post towns of Hampton and Teddington, those of East Molesey and Kingston upon Thames taking the remainder.

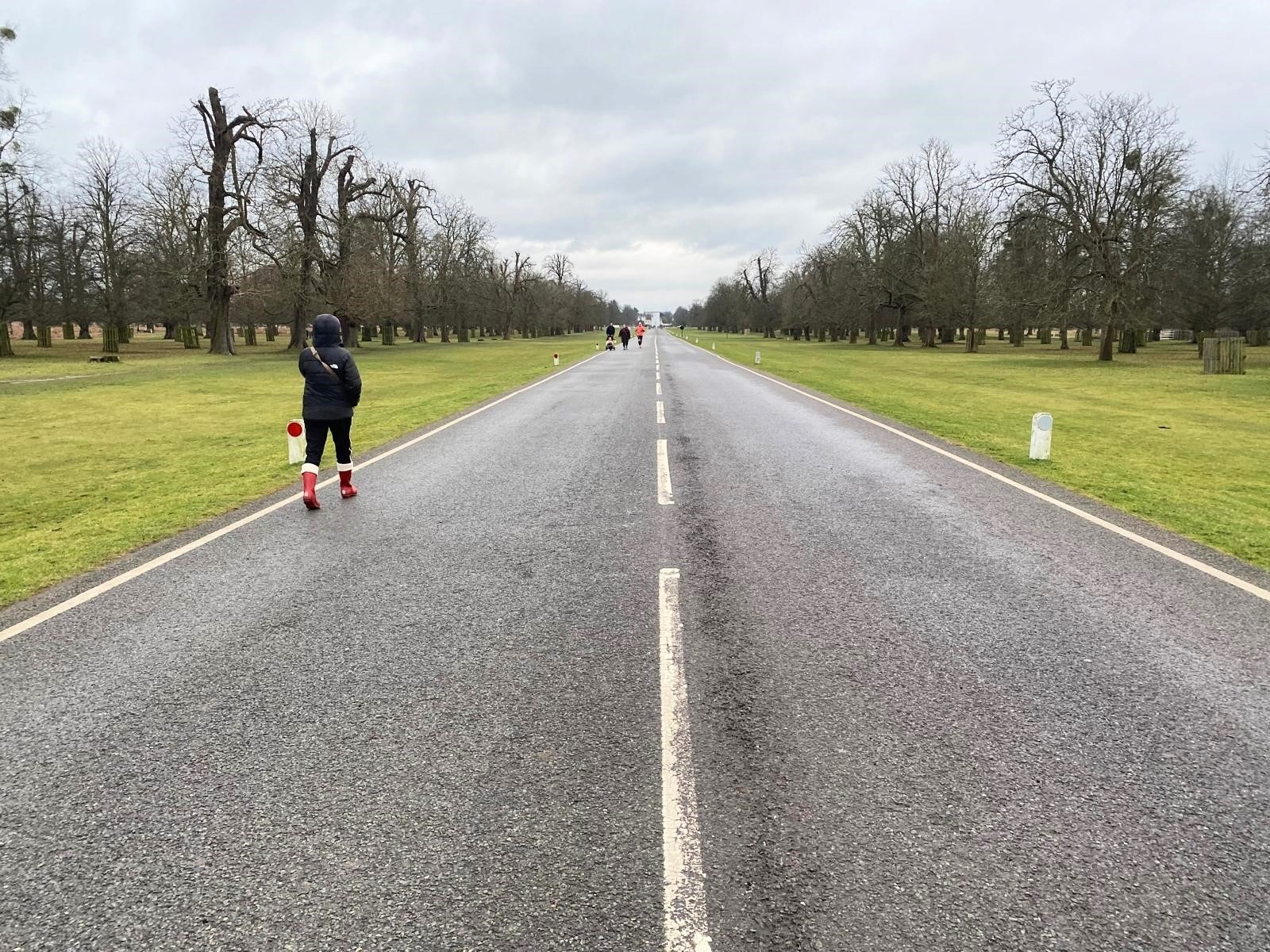
Chestnut avenue, the main road inside Bushy Park.

In September 2014, most of it was designated a biological Site of Special Scientific Interest together with Hampton Court Park and Hampton Court Golf Course as Bushy Park and Home Park SSSI. The park is listed at Grade I on the Register of Historic Parks and Gardens.

== History ==
The area now known as Bushy Park has been settled for at least the past 4,000 years: the earliest archaeological records that have been found on the site date back to the Bronze Age. There is also evidence that the area was used in the medieval period for agricultural purposes.

When Henry VIII took over Hampton Court Palace from Cardinal Thomas Wolsey in 1529, the King named three parks that make up modern-day Bushy Park and a small area beside: Hare Warren, Middle Park and Bushy Park. A keen hunter, he established them as deer-hunting grounds.

His successors, perhaps less involved in traditional sporting activities, added a number of picturesque features, including the Longford River, a 19-kilometre (12 mi) canal built on the orders of Charles I to provide water to Hampton Court, and the park's various ponds. This period also saw the construction of the main thoroughfare, Chestnut Avenue, which runs from Park Road in Teddington to the Lion Gate entrance to Hampton Court Palace in Hampton Court Road. This avenue and the Arethusa 'Diana' Fountain were designed by Sir Christopher Wren as a grand approach to Hampton Court Palace.

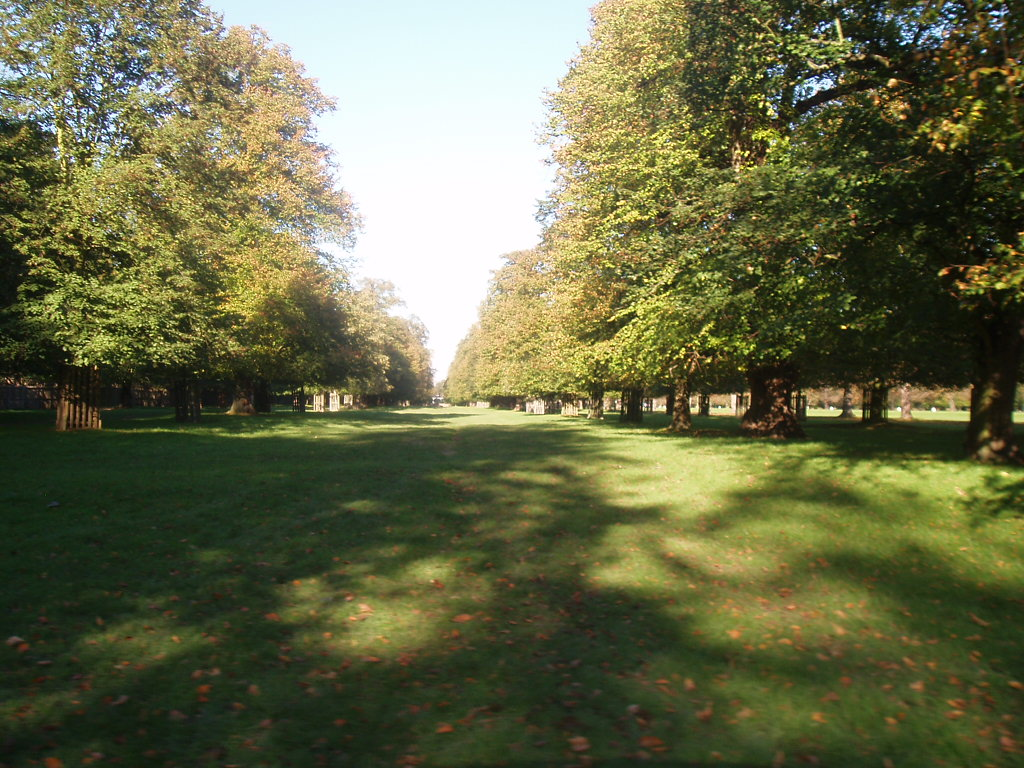
Chestnut trees in early autumn

The park has long been popular with locals, but also attracts visitors from further afield. From the mid-19th century until World War II, Londoners came here to celebrate Chestnut Sunday and to see the abundant blossoming of the trees along Chestnut Avenue. The customs were discovered and resurrected in 1993 by Colin and Mu Pain.

Among those who served as ranger (an honorary position, long including residence at Bushy House) was King William IV, while Duke of Clarence (1797–1830). To ensure his consort Queen Adelaide, could remain at their long-time home after his death, he immediately appointed her as his successor as ranger (1830–1849), after whose death the position was left vacant and fell into disuse.

During World War I, Bushy Park housed the King's Canadian Hospital in the modern "White Lodge", and between the wars it hosted a camp for undernourished children.

During World War II, General Dwight D. Eisenhower planned the D-Day landings from Supreme Headquarters Allied Expeditionary Force (SHAEF) at Camp Griffiss in the Park. A memorial by Carlos Rey dedicated to the Allied troops who fell on D-Day now marks the spot where General Eisenhower's tent stood. The nearby Eisenhower House is named in the General's honour, and Shaef Gate is named after the Supreme Headquarters Allied Expeditionary Force.

From May 1942, a group of temporary buildings on the north-east of the park, codenamed Widewing, hosted the de facto headquarters of the US Eighth Air Force under Generals Carl Spaatz and, later, Ira Eaker. Spaatz went on to command the US Army Air Forces throughout the European Theatre of Operations (ETO) and in early 1944 became commander of the newly formed US Strategic Air Forces (USSTAF) in Europe at Widewing. Also known by its US Army code, AAF-586, Camp Griffiss/Widewing was often confused with the wartime headquarters of VIII Fighter Command (part of Eighth Air Force) at Bushey Hall, near Watford, Hertfordshire. The park also had a runway for planes.

== The park today ==
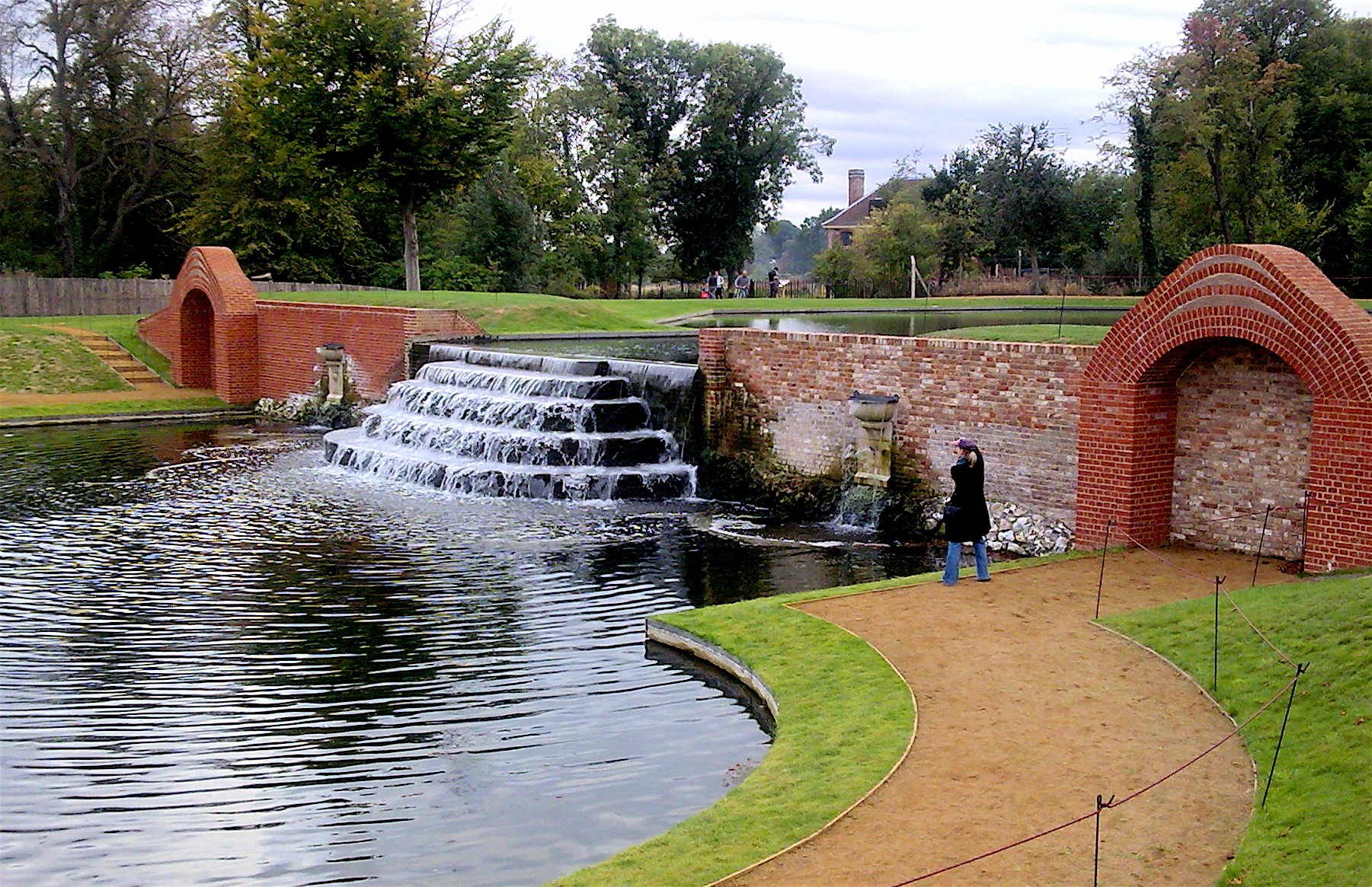
Upper Lodge Water Gardens

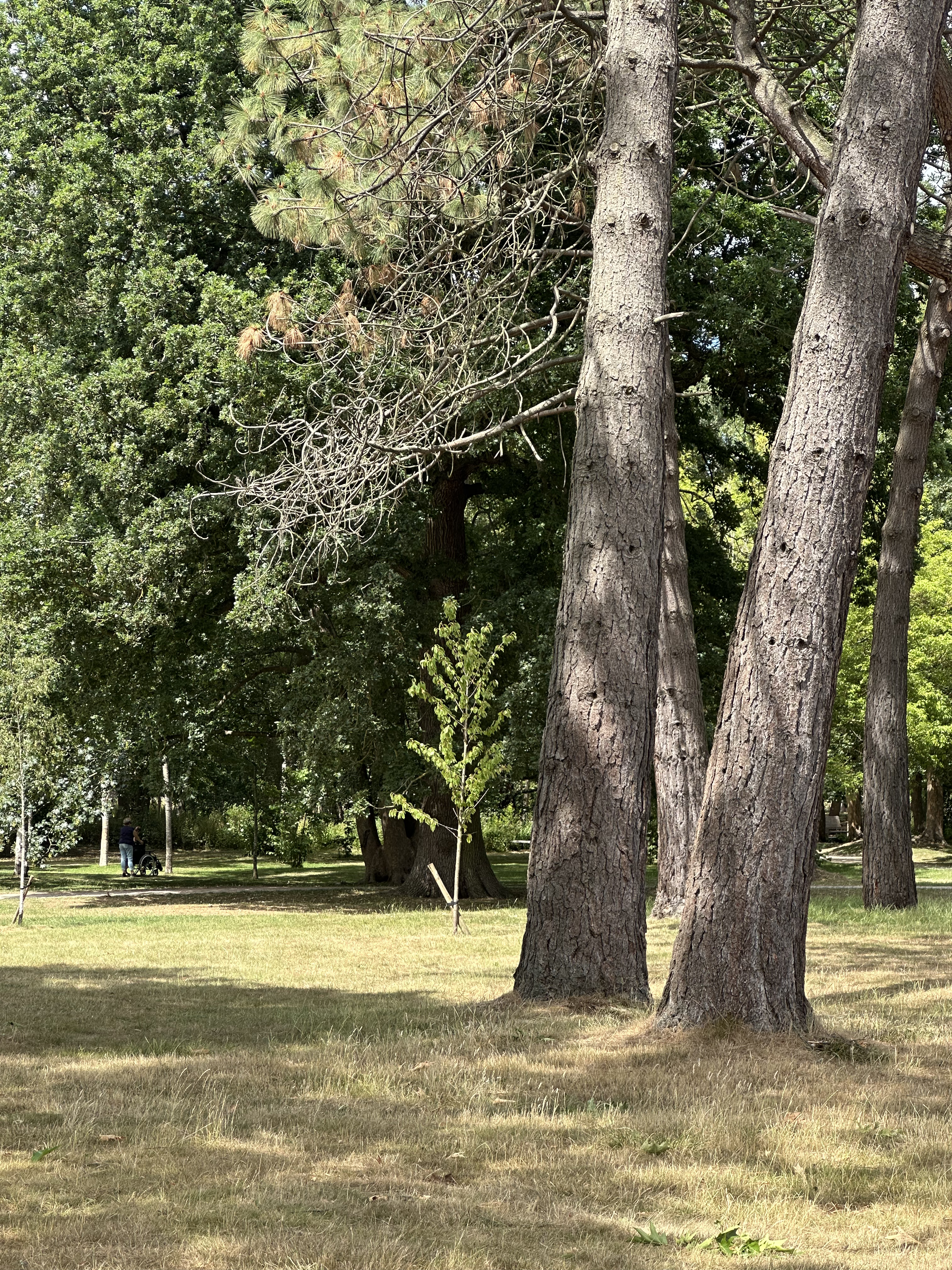
Woodland Gardens in June

Originally created for royal sports, Bushy Park is now home to Teddington Rugby Club and four cricket clubs – Teddington Town Cricket Club, Hampton Wick Royal Cricket Club, Teddington Cricket Club, and Hampton Hill Cricket Club. Teddington Hockey Club was based in the Park until it moved to Teddington School; from 1871 onwards, the rules of the modern game of field hockey were largely devised at Bushy. It also has fishing and model boating ponds, horse rides, formal plantations of trees and other plants, wildlife conservation areas, and herds of both red deer and fallow deer.

The park also contains several lodges and cottages: Bushy House, housing the National Physical Laboratory (NPL) at the Teddington end, and the Royal Paddocks and two areas of allotments – the Royal Paddocks Allotments at Hampton Wick and the Bushy Park Allotments at Hampton Hill.

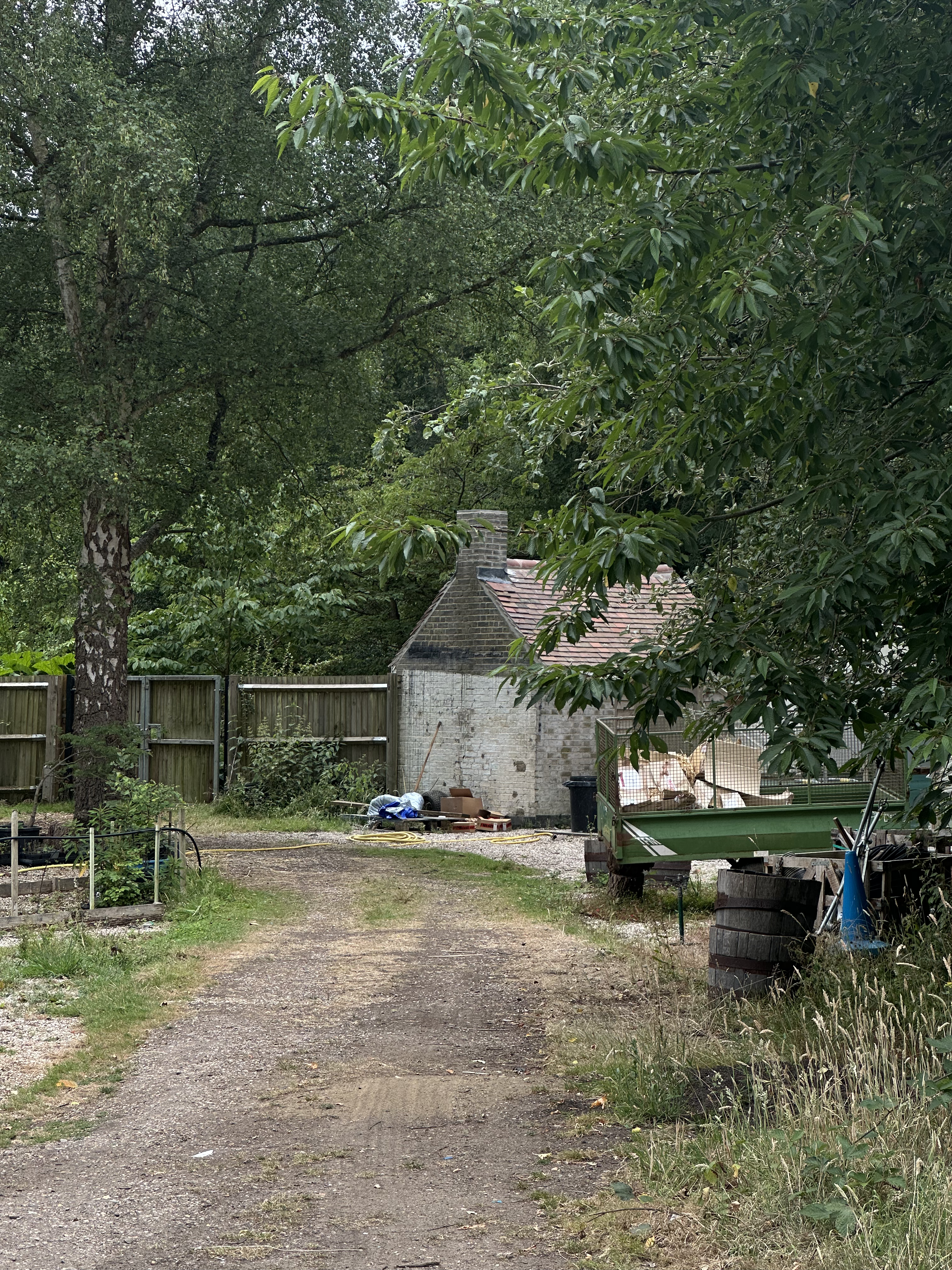
The keepers' outhouse in Woodland Gardens

The original parkrun began in Bushy Park in October 2004, initially as the 'Bushy Park Time Trial', then Bushy parkrun. It is a free, timed, 5 K run that takes place every Saturday morning at 9 am, attracting around 1,500 runners each week. Events also take place annually on Christmas Day and New Year's Day.

As part of an upgrade of the park facilities, the new Pheasantry Café was added, and the restored and largely reconstructed Upper Lodge Water Gardens were opened in October 2009. The work was supported by the Heritage Lottery Fund.

== Flora and fauna ==
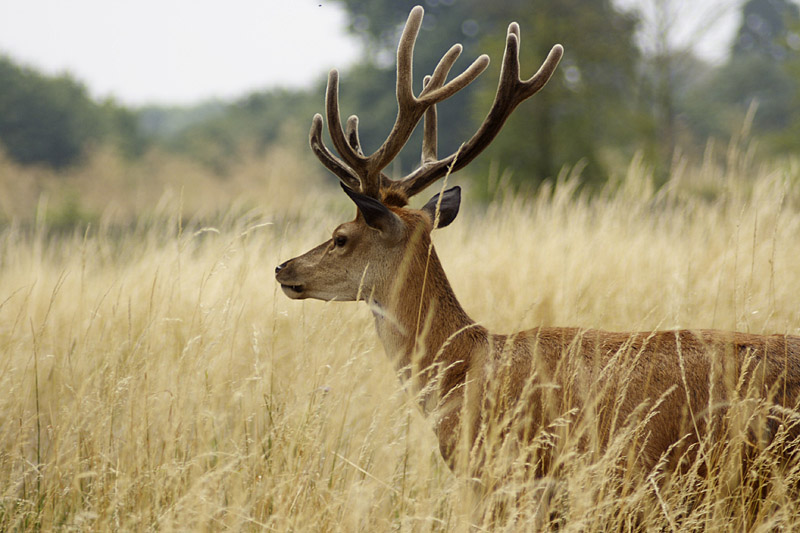
One of the park's deer

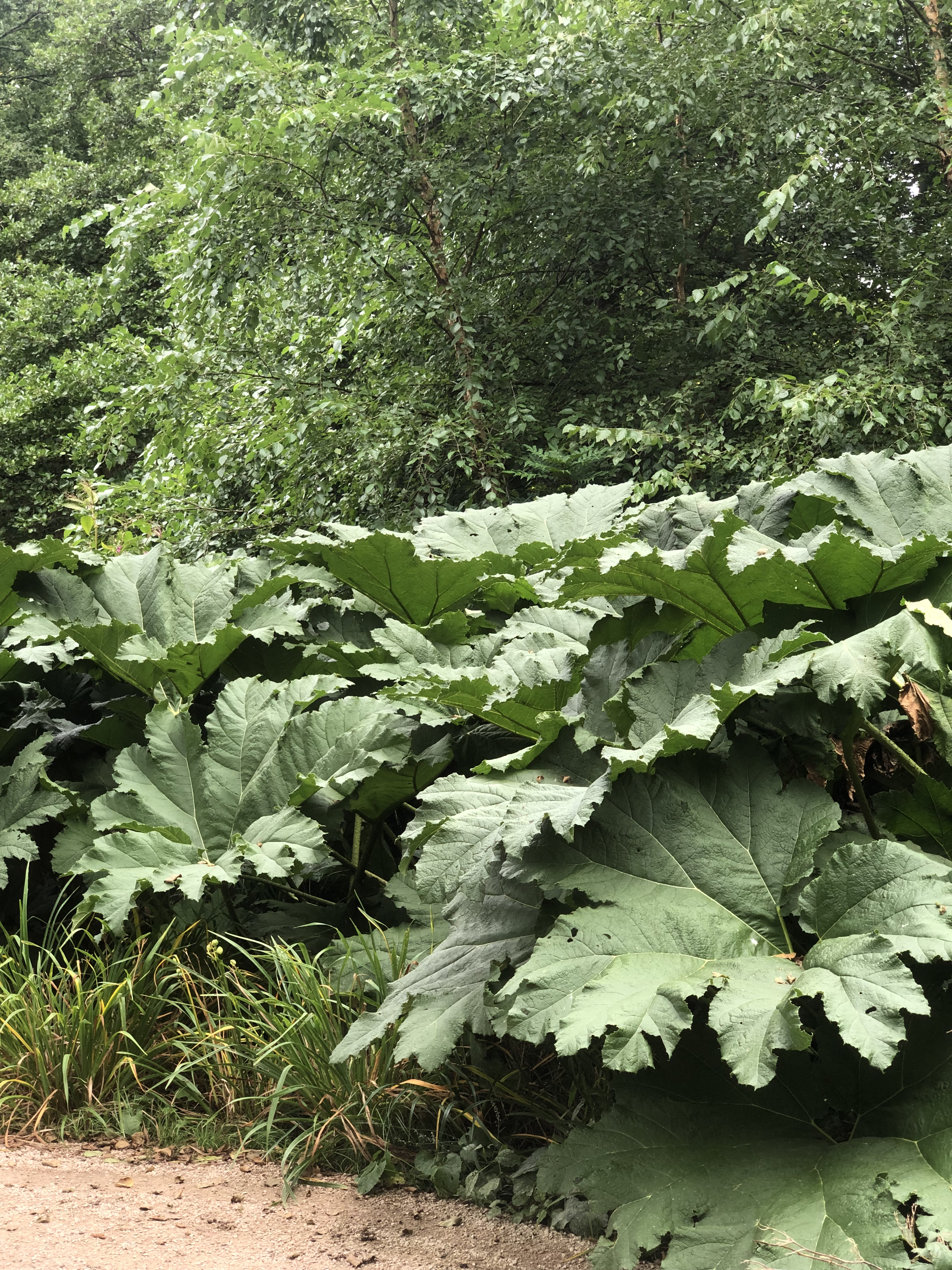
Mega-flora in Woodland Gardens

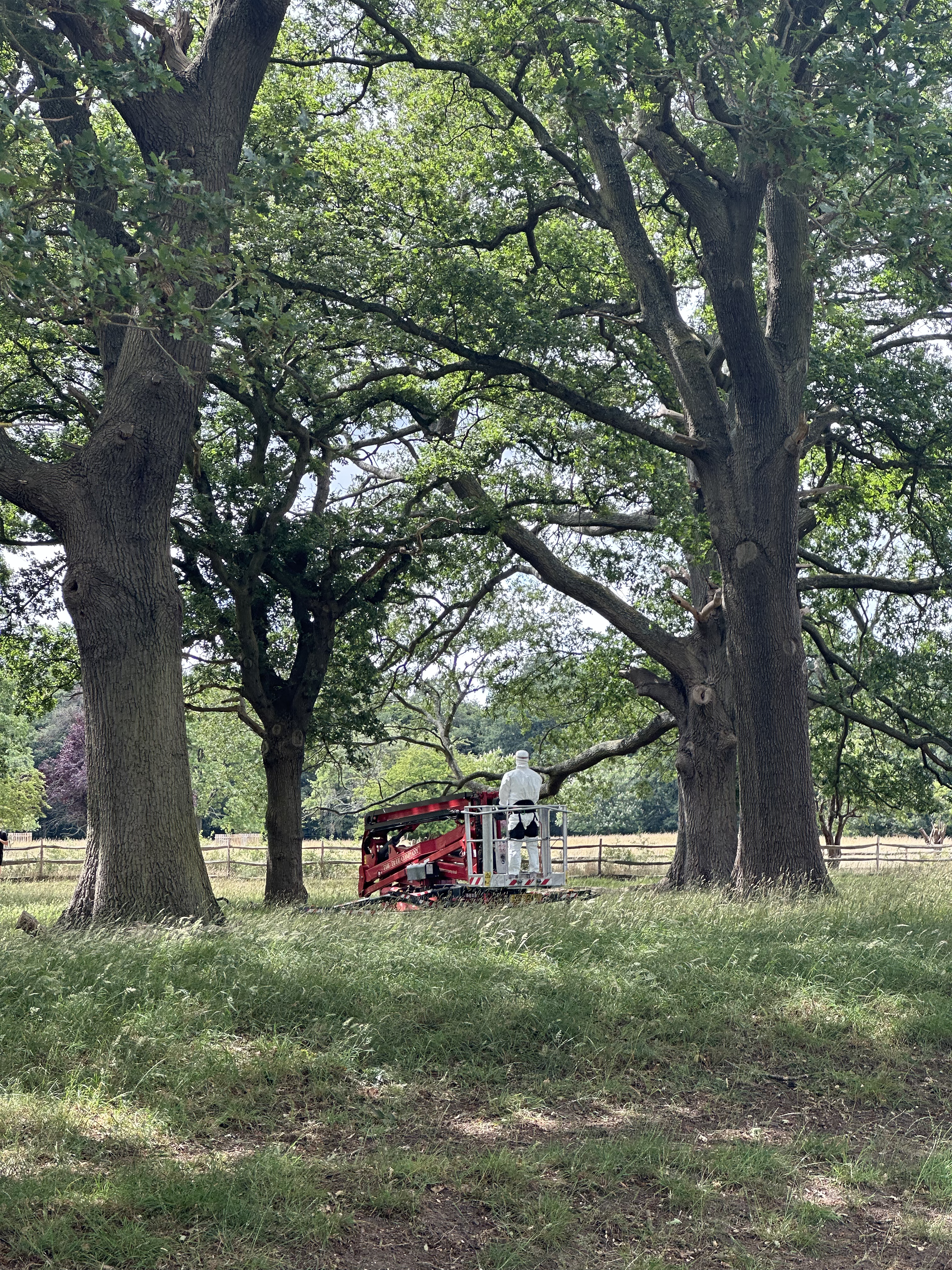
Team using scissor-lift to remove a hornets' nest

Bushy Park is part of the Bushy Park and Home Park SSSI designated in September 2014 for its range of semi-natural habitats such as acid and neutral grassland, scrubland, woodland, and wood pasture. There is an internationally important assemblage of invertebrates due to the mosaic of habitats including two hundred veteran trees.

A fungus gnat – a type of fly – new to the UK was found in the Waterhouse Woodland Gardens by entomologist Peter Chandler and identified as Grzegorzekia bushyae and also known as the Bushy gnat. This fly has since been found in a forest in south-east France.

== Transport ==
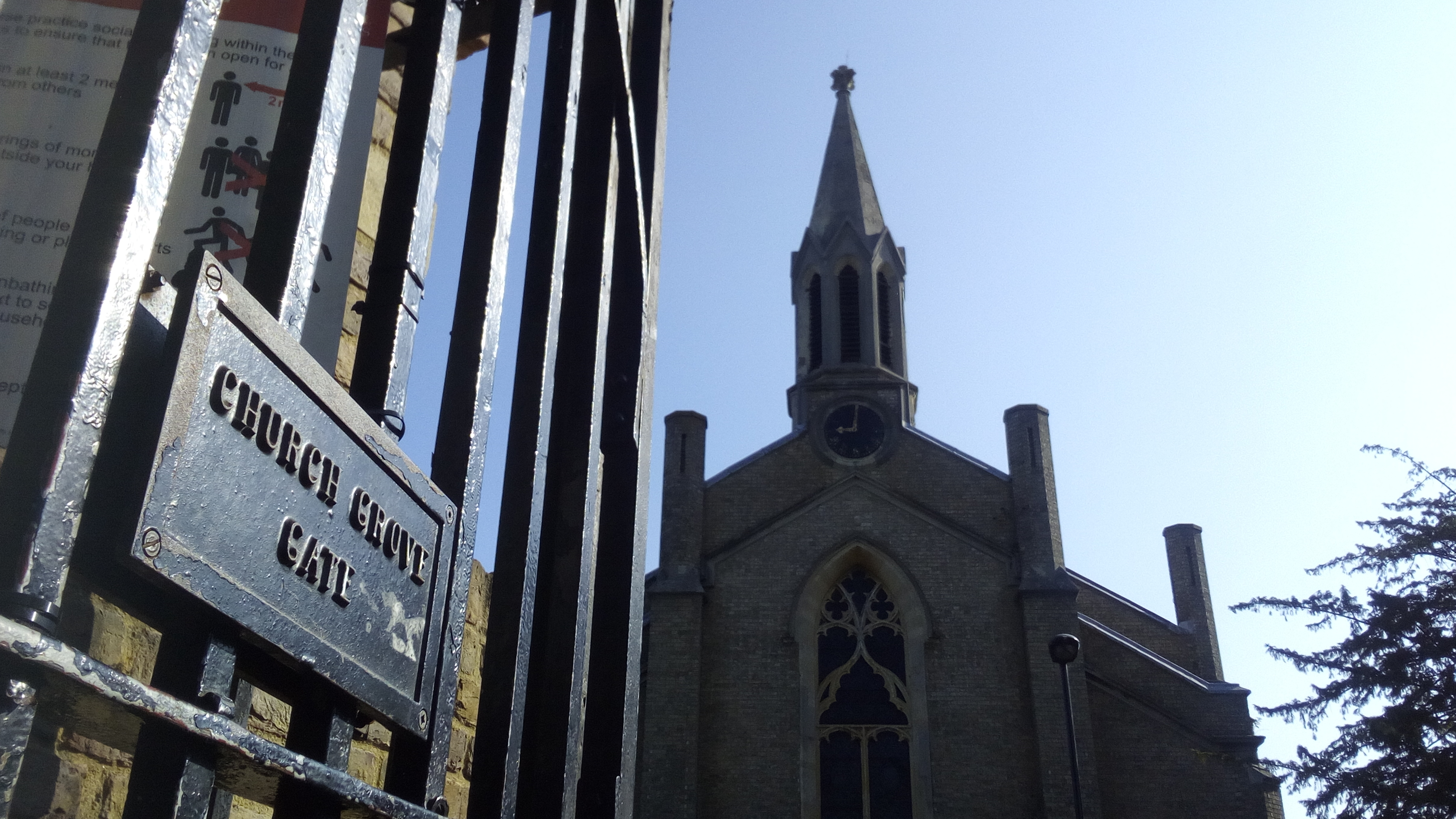
Church Grove Gate opposite St John's church, Hampton Wick, is the park's closest gate to Kingston Bridge and Kingston Town centre.

The closest railway stations are Hampton Court in East Molesey to the south, Hampton Wick to the east, Teddington and Fulwell to the north, and Hampton to the west. All are within a 10- to 20-minute walk.

Transport for London bus routes 111, 216, and 411, as well as Falcon bus 461 all pass the Hampton Court Gate on Hampton Court Road (the main southern entrance to the Park).

R70, R68, and 285 buses stop near the two Hampton Hill Gates off the High Street, while the R68 also serves the Blandford Road Gate (next to the NPL on Hampton Road, Teddington) before continuing to Hampton Court Green via Hampton Hill.

To the north, the main Teddington gate on Park Road, and a second on Sandy Lane, are only served by a half-hourly 481 bus service. But, the main gate is best reached, either on foot or by bike, from Teddington's town centre, which is served by the 33, 281, 285, 481, R68, and SL7 services, via Park Road, or from the railway station.

The main north and south gates, connected by the Chestnut Avenue private highway, provide vehicle access to traffic from 6.30am until dusk (or to 7.00pm in the winter months). There is one straight road through the Park between the two gates but cars are no longer permitted to drive straight through the Park, and can only access respective car parks from either gate.

There is 24/7 bicycle access via the main avenue between the north and south gates and cycle paths/restricted access private highways across the park.

== See also ==
- List of Sites of Special Scientific Interest in Greater London
