= Hubert Le Sueur =

French sculptor

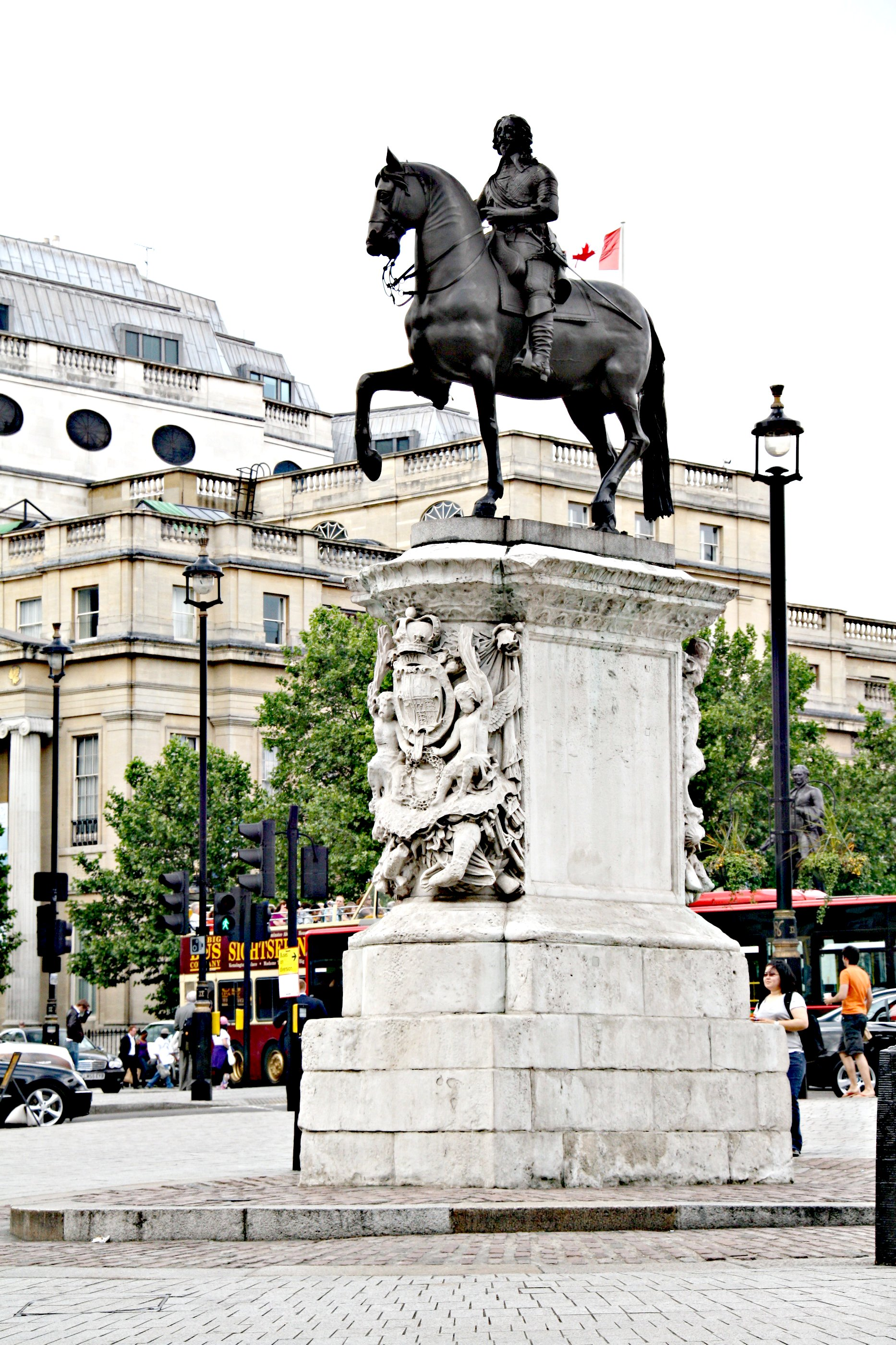
Equestrian statue of Charles I. Cast 1633, by Hubert Le Sueur, Trafalgar Square, London

Hubert Le Sueur (French pronunciation: [ybɛʁ lə sɥœʁ]; c. 1580 – 1658) was a French sculptor with the contemporaneous reputation of having trained in Giambologna's Florentine workshop. He assisted Giambologna's foreman, Pietro Tacca, in Paris, in finishing and erecting the Equestrian Statue of Henry IV on the Pont Neuf. He moved to England and spent the most productive decades of his working career there, providing monuments, portraits and replicas of classical antiquities for the court of Charles I, where his main rival was Francesco Fanelli.

== Career ==
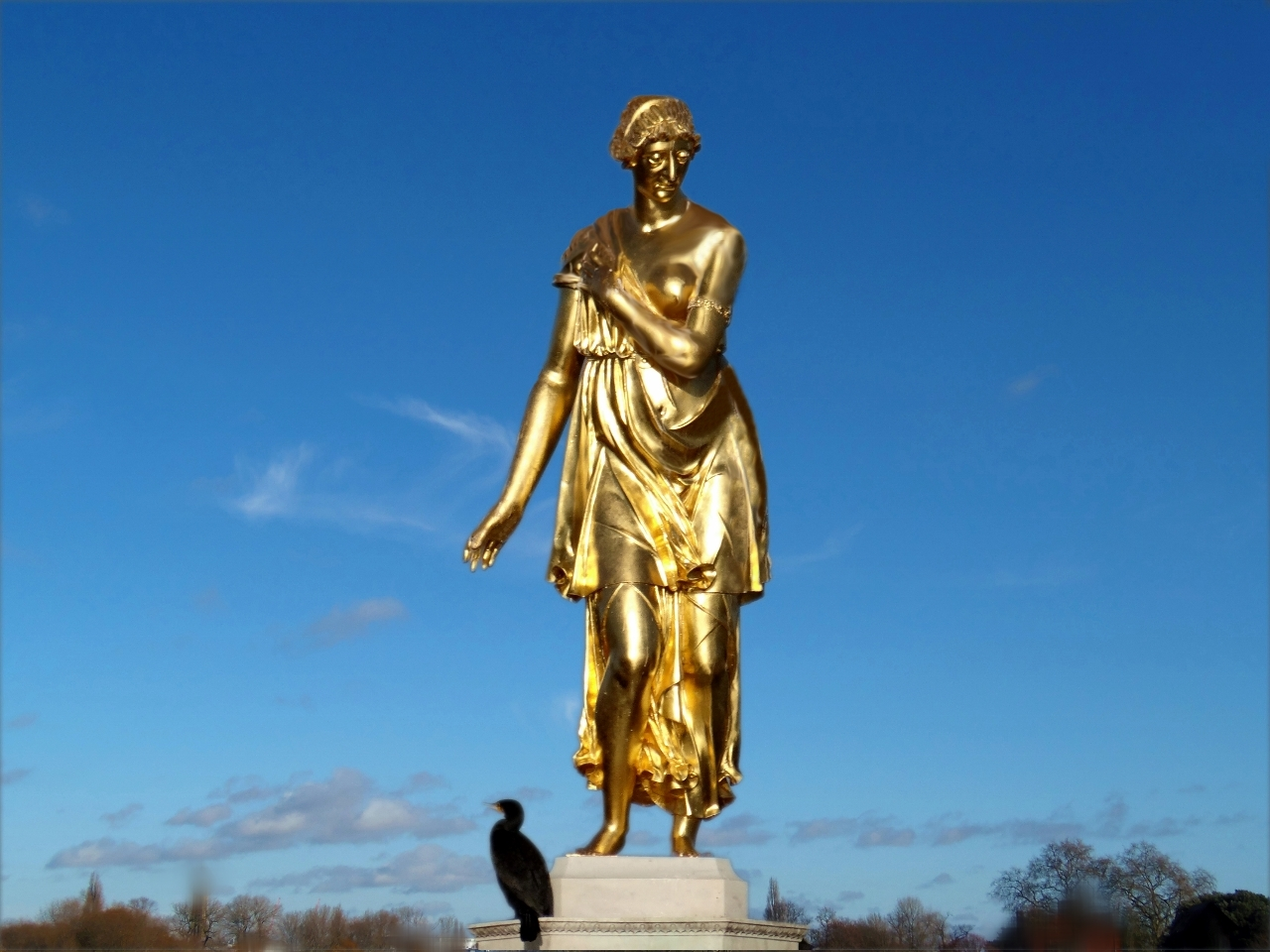
Bronze statue of Diana by Le Sueur, Diana Fountain, Bushy Park

Henry Peacham was informed that Le Sueur was a pupil of Giambologna in Florence. Though he is not otherwise documented in Florence, in Paris he was recorded as sculpteur du Roy at the baptism of his son at Saint-Germain l'Auxerrois in 1610, when a royal secretary and the daughter of another served as witnesses. In London he and his second wife were of the Huguenot congregation in Threadneedle Street. He worked with Pietro Tacca's assistants on the equestrian bronze of Henry IV on the Pont Neuf, a project that gave him technical skills that were put to use in his equestrian Charles I. Since Inigo Jones had passed through Paris in July 1613, in the train of Lord Arundel, on their way to Strasbourg, Katharine Esdaile suggested that Jones was the one who convinced Le Sueur to go to England.

The earliest occasion on which Le Sueur received an official commission in England was for twelve figures against the frieze of the grand catafalque— both figures and hearse designed by Inigo Jones — for James I's funeral in 1625. In 1628, Le Sueur provided armour for Jeffrey Hudson, a court dwarf serving Henrietta Maria. In the 1630s, he worked in "brass and marble" for a fountain in the Queen's garden at Somerset House.

In 1631 he was dispatched to Rome to arrange to have moulds taken of classical antiquities, to complement the Borghese Gladiator, moulds of which had been obtained for Charles, and which Le Sueur cast in London for the Privy Garden of the Palace of Whitehall. Henry Peacham praised Le Sueur for his skill and credits the Catholic priest and agent, George Gage, with obtaining the relevant casts in Rome: "The best of them is the Gladiator, molded from that in Cardinall Borgheses Villa, by the procurement and industry of ingenious Master Gage."

On a recommendation of Sir Balthazar Gerbier, he cast the famous bronze equestrian statue of Charles I, made in 1633 for Richard, Lord Weston, Lord High Treasurer, for his house Mortlake Park in Roehampton. This statue was ordered to be destroyed by Parliament in 1649. After being hidden by the man charged with destroying the statue, it resurfaced at the Restoration and was erected in 1675 at the original site of Charing Cross, at Trafalgar Square, London (on a small traffic island at the entrance to The Mall).

In 1633, the same year he made the equestrian statue of Charles I, Le Sueur was also commissioned to make a bronze sculpture of Vice-Admiral Sir Richard Leveson (c.1570–1605) for St Peter's Collegiate Church in Wolverhampton. Although the original composition was dismantled following damage during the English Civil War, the surviving components, comprising Leveson’s bronze effigy and two accompanying cherubs, survive in the church's Lady Chapel.

In 1634 he made for the King a cast of the Diane Chasseresse then still at Fontainebleau. Le Sueur created a market for the portrait bust, initiated and epitomized by a series of bronze busts and one marble bust of Charles I (1631), now at the Victoria and Albert Museum, the only work in marble by Le Sueur known to exist. A bust of Katherine, Lady Dysart, was formerly at Ham House. There are bronze sculptures by Le Sueur for tombs in Westminster Abbey, of the Stuart Kings Charles I and James I originally in niches on the former screen by Inigo Jones in Winchester Cathedral and now re-located at the west end of the Cathedral in which Le Sueur also provided the bronze reclining figure for the tomb of Lord Portland. At Oxford are his lifesize bronze standing figures of King Charles and Queen Henrietta Maria, made for Archbishop Laud, 1634, now at St John's College, and of William Herbert, 3rd Earl of Pembroke (1580–1630), originally standing in the forecourt at Wilton House and in 1723 donated by the 8th Earl to the Bodleian Library, Oxford, where it now stands outdoors in front of the main entrance.

With the beginnings of the English Civil War, English court patronage dried up, and Le Sueur returned to Paris in 1643, produced four busts of Richelieu for the Duchess of Aiguillon, and disappeared from art history. Le Sueur is last recorded as being alive in 1658, although this is not definitively his date of death; in 1668 his wife was recorded as being a widow and thus the Oxford Dictionary of National Biography records Le Sueur's date of death as being between 1658 and 1668.

His known pupils were both of Huguenot extraction as was Le Sueur himself: one was Peter Besnier (or Bennier), appointed sculptor to the king after Le Sueur's departure; another was John Poultrain or Colt.

== Selected works ==
- Bust of King Charles I, dated 1631, by Hubert Le Sueur (V&A Museum, no. A.35-1910)
- Equestrian statue of Charles I, 1633; at Charing Cross, London.
