= Francesco Fanelli =

Italian sculptor

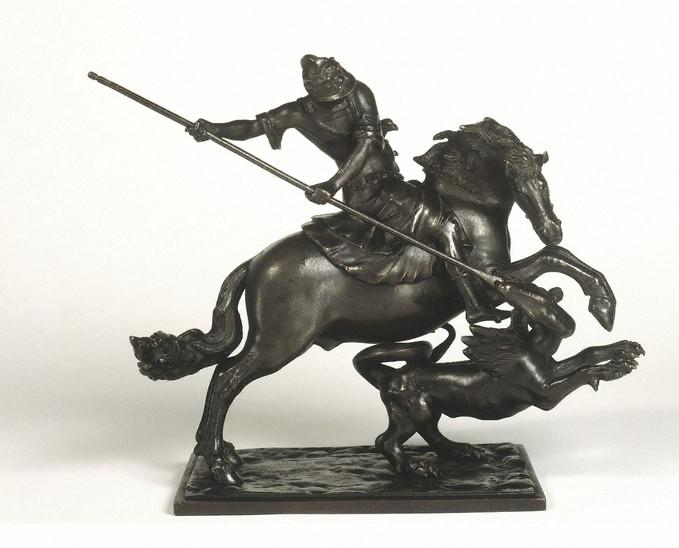
Statuette, about 1640, Francesco Fanelli V&A Museum no. A.5-1953

Francesco Fanelli (c. 1590–1653) was an Italian sculptor, born in Florence, who spent most of his career in England.

He likely had contacts if not training in the studio of Giambologna, then in the hands of Pietro Francavilla and Pietro Tacca. He is recorded at work in Genoa in 1609-10 then worked in London from about 1610, as a sculptor in ivory — Joachim von Sandrart mentions an ivory statuette of Pygmalion that attracted the attention of Charles I of England — but mostly as a skilled bronze-caster. He made a fountain of sirens astride dolphins, alternating with scallop shells, with putti clasping fish and other figures, for the king at Hampton Court Palace. It was noticed by John Evelyn in 1662, and some elements remain, perched on a high rusticated base, as the Diana Fountain in Bushy Park.

He received a pension in 1635 as "sculptor of the King". His only signed sculpture is a portrait bust of a youthful Charles II as Prince of Wales, dated 1640, at Welbeck Abbey. He left England in 1642 about the same time as his more conservative rival sculptor, the Huguenot, Hubert Le Sueur, also returned to Paris.

Abraham van der Doort's inventory of the collection of Charles I calls him "ffrancisco the one-eyed Italian". The king had a St George and the Dragon and a Cupid on Horseback in black patination among 36 small bronzes in the cabinet room at Whitehall Palace. George Vertue noted that the outstanding horseman and connoisseur of the riding academy, William Cavendish, first Duke of Newcastle at Welbeck, had a number of Fanelli's horse statuettes. John Pope-Hennessy has identified as Fanelli's a range of bronze statuettes of St. George and the Dragon and other equestrian subjects. The tomb monument to Sir John Bridgeman and his wife in Ludlow church has been attributed to him. Mary, Countess of Home had a cast of his "George".

== Public collections ==
Among the public collections holding works by Francesco Fanelli are:

- Museum de Fundatie in Zwolle
