= Camp Griffiss =

Former US military base in Bushy Park, London

Coordinates: 51.4194°N 0.3291°W

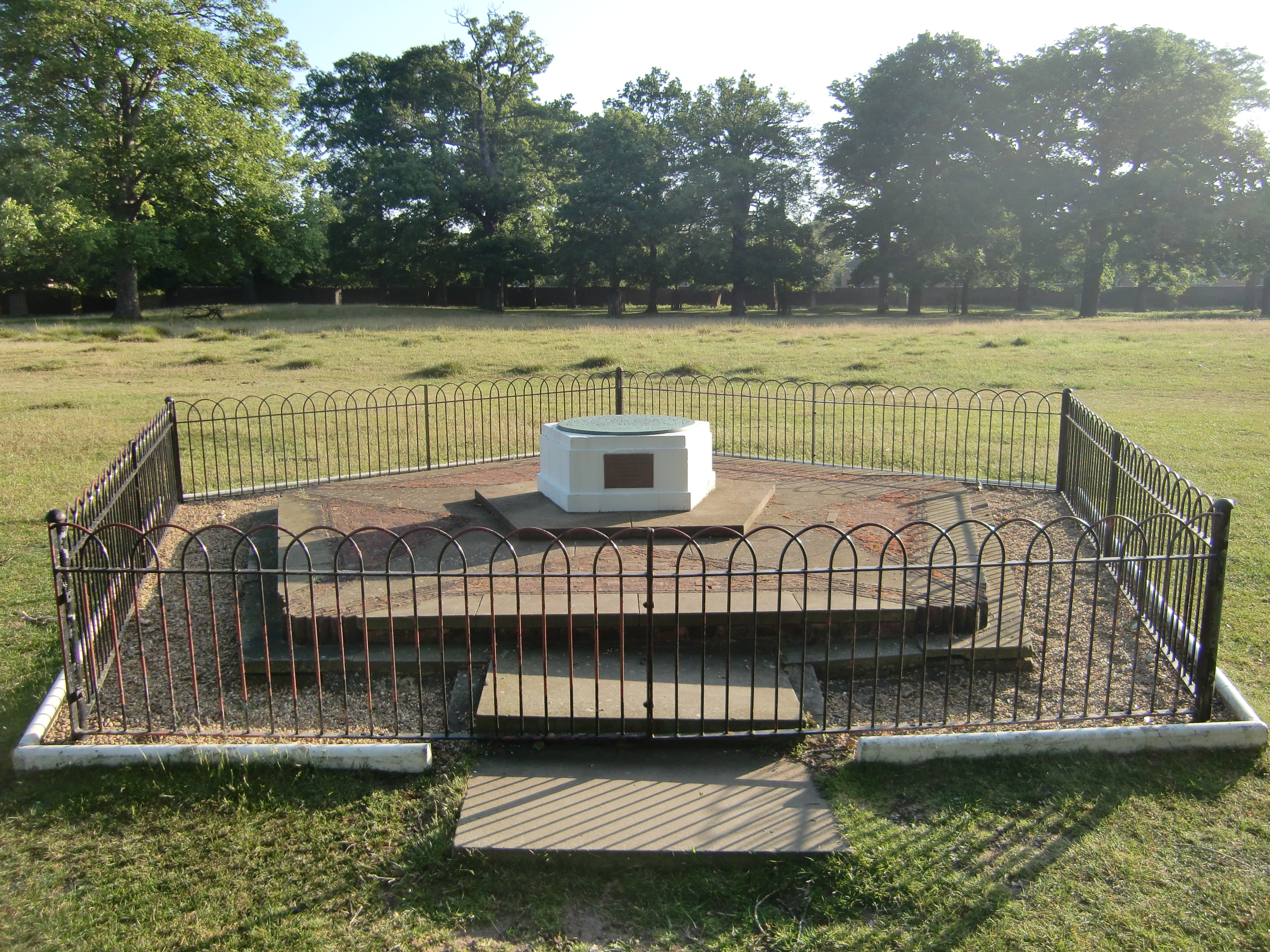
A brick pentacle and plaque commemorating the site

Camp Griffiss was a US military base in the United Kingdom during and after World War II. Constructed within the grounds of Bushy Park in Middlesex (now in the London Borough of Richmond upon Thames), England, it served as the European Headquarters for the United States Army Air Forces from July 1942 to December 1944. From here Dwight D. Eisenhower planned the D-Day invasion. Most of the camp's huts had been removed by the early 1960s, and a memorial tablet now stands on the site.

== Location ==
Camp Griffiss was at the Teddington end of Bushy Park, east of the axial road.

== History ==
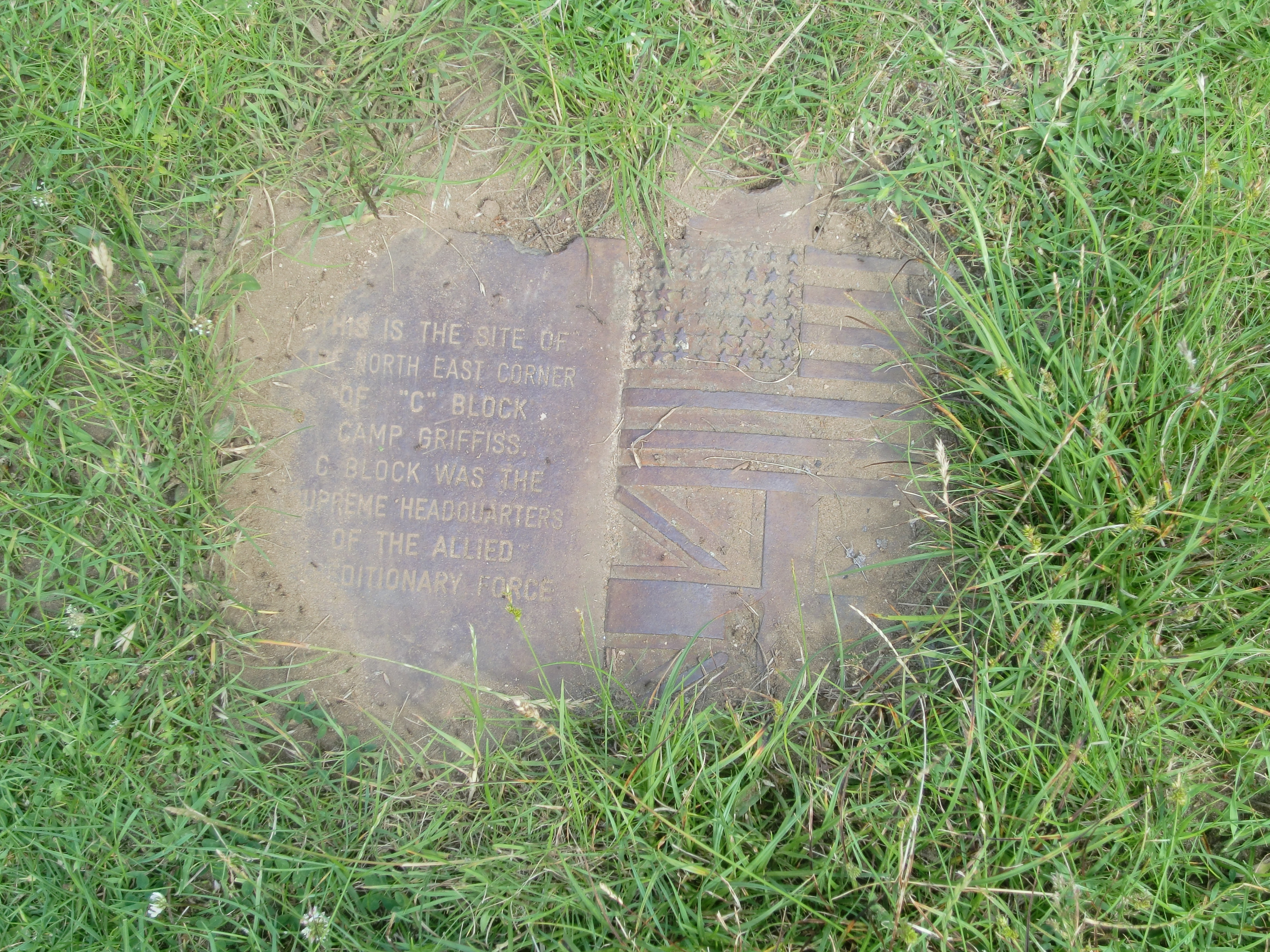
Plaque marking corner of C block

From 1942, Camp Griffiss in Bushy Park became the site of a large US base, headquarters to a number of the Allied departments. The camp served as the European Headquarters for the USAAF from July 1942 to December 1944. General Dwight Eisenhower was averse to working in the centre of London during World War II. He decided instead to make Bushy Park the Supreme Headquarters Allied Expeditionary Force (SHAEF) centre for planning Operation Overlord, the code name for the Allied invasion of north-west Europe that began with the D-Day landings.

The base was named after Lieutenant Colonel Townsend Griffiss. Griffiss had been aide to Major General James E. Chaney, and was killed in a friendly fire incident when the aircraft in which he was a passenger was mistakenly shot down by Royal Air Force (RAF) Polish fliers. He was the first US airman to die in the line of duty in Europe since the US entered World War II.

It was a common belief amongst those stationed at the camp that the US base was originally intended to be at Bushey in Hertfordshire and was built in Bushy Park due to an error.

== Post-war ==
When the Forces left, for several years after, homeless families, referred to as squatters, moved into the empty huts, making use of the vacant facilities, toilet blocks, water stand pipes etc.

Most of the camp's huts were removed by 1963. Near the Teddington end of the park, not far from Chestnut Avenue, are two memorials: A circular USAAF Memorial tablet on a raised pentagonal block within a five-pointed brick star within a small five-sided enclosure.

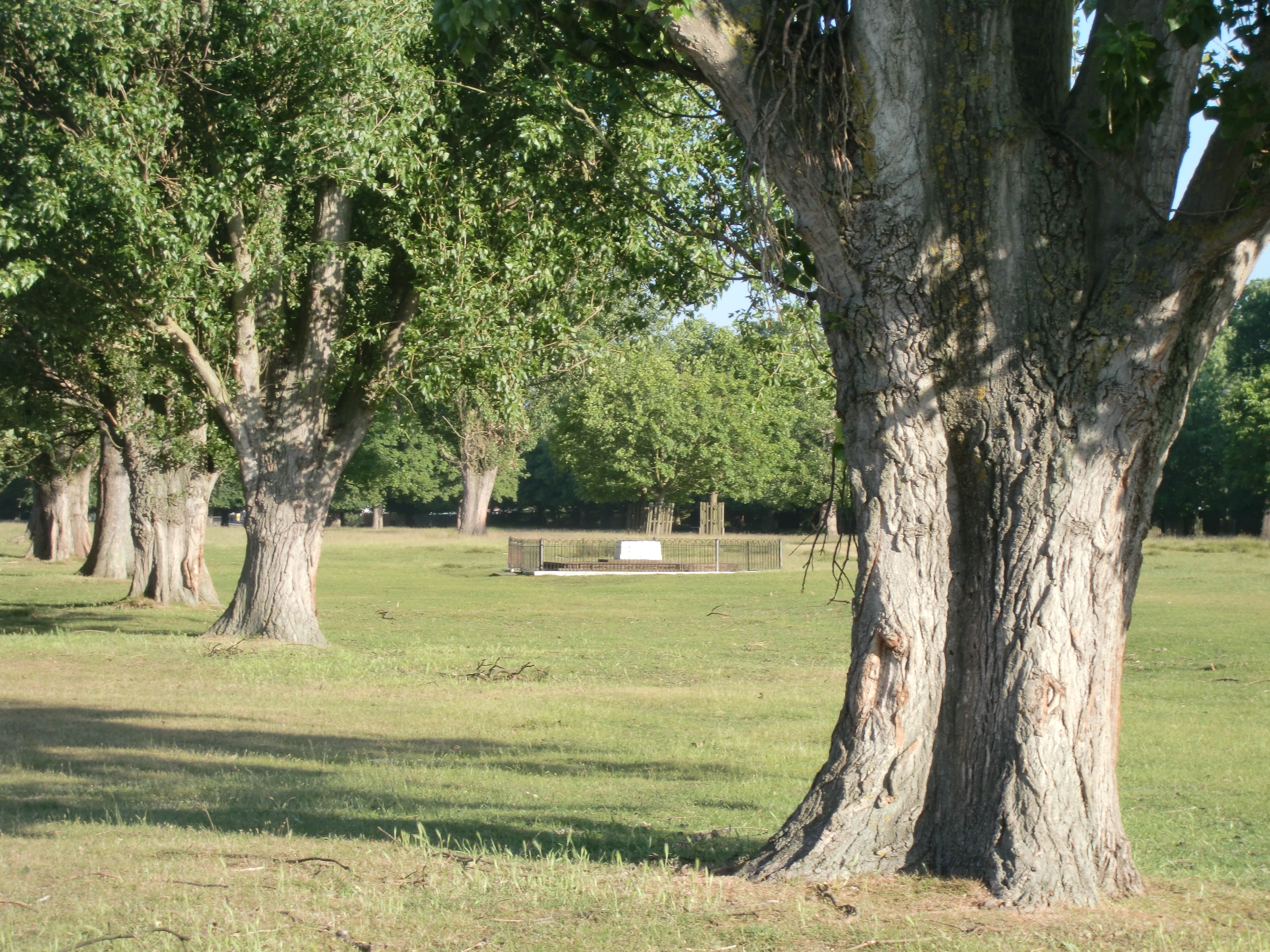
USAAF memorial

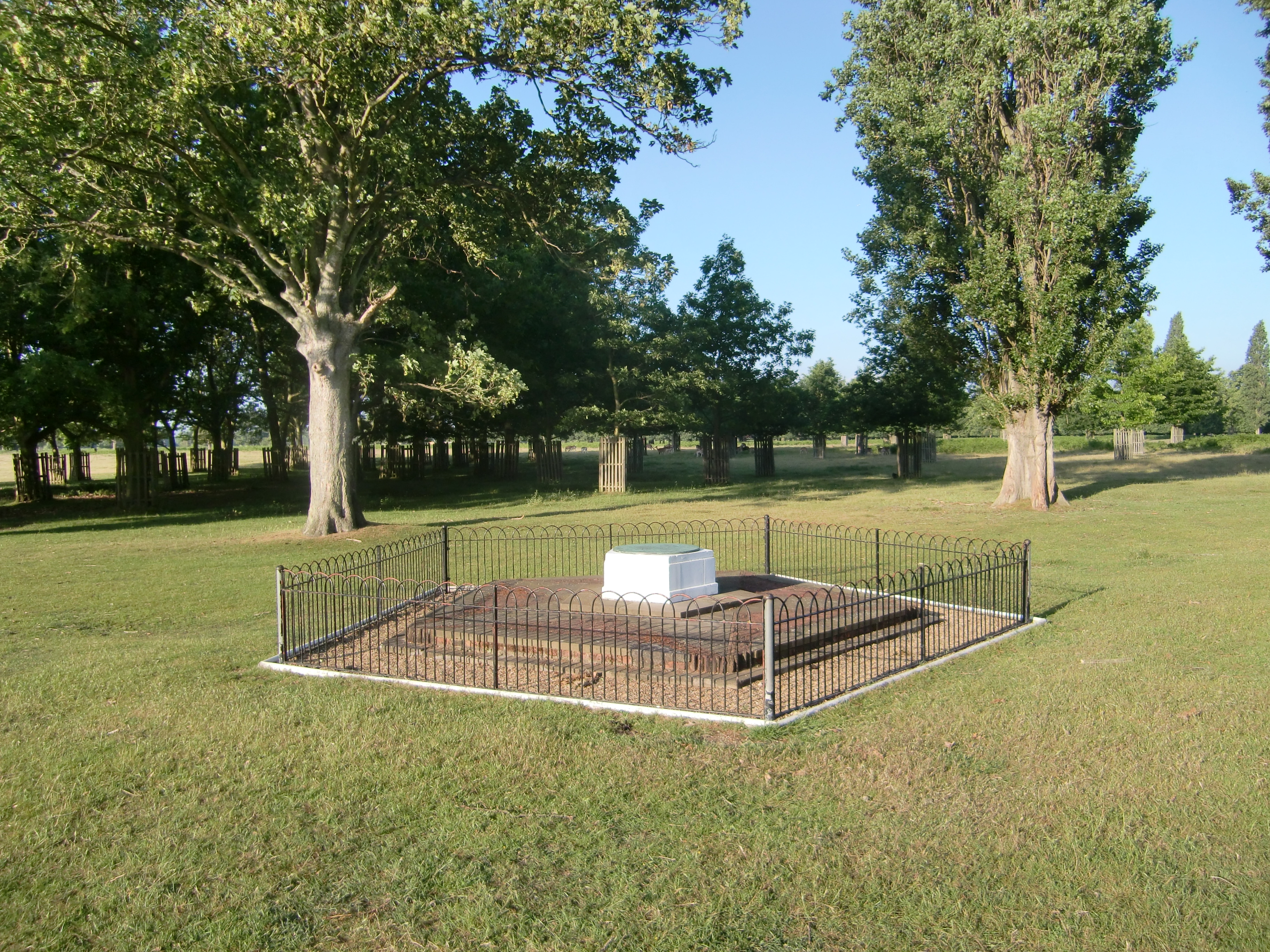
The USAAF memorial has a low five sided fence around it

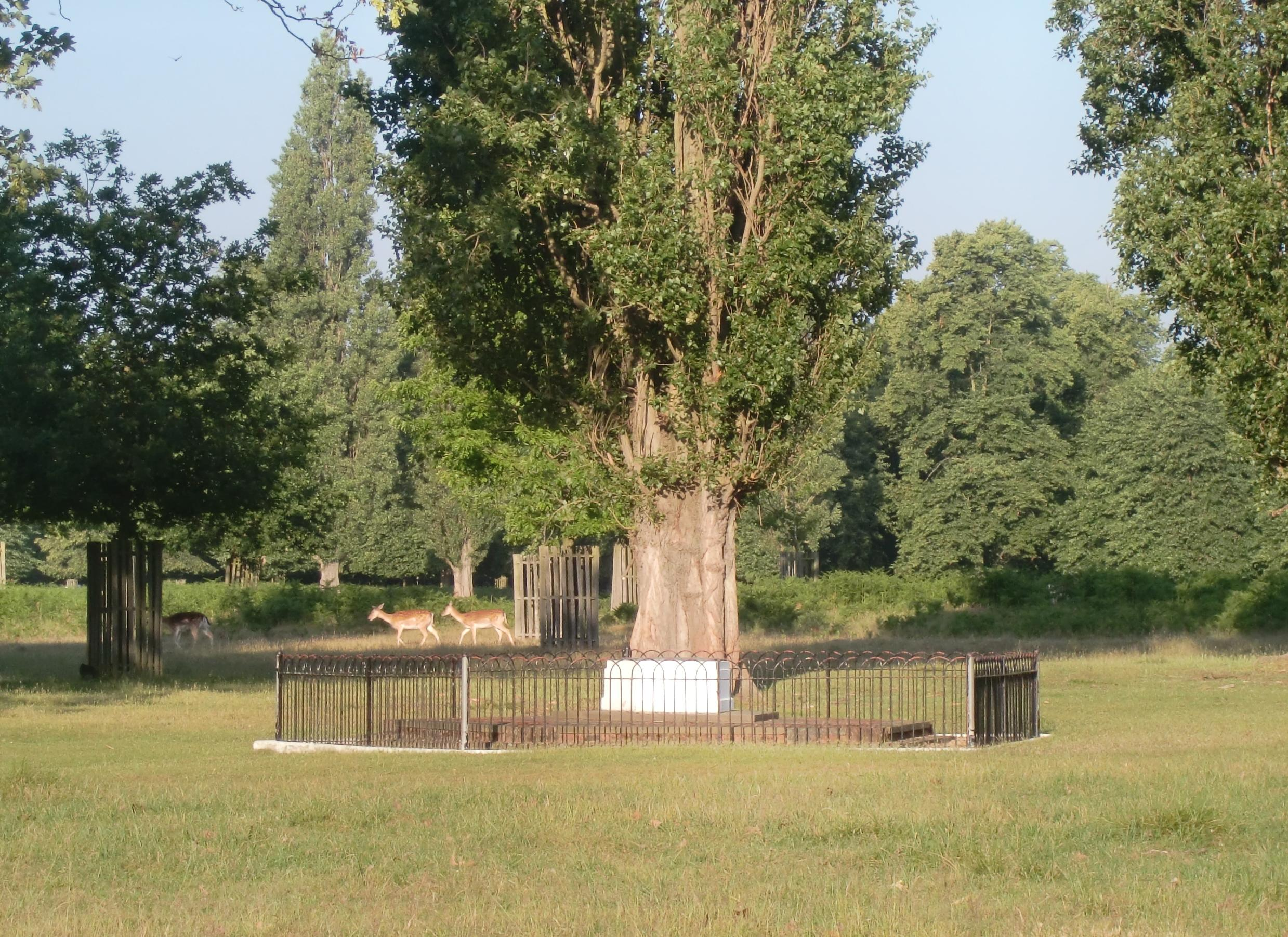
The area has been returned to the deer

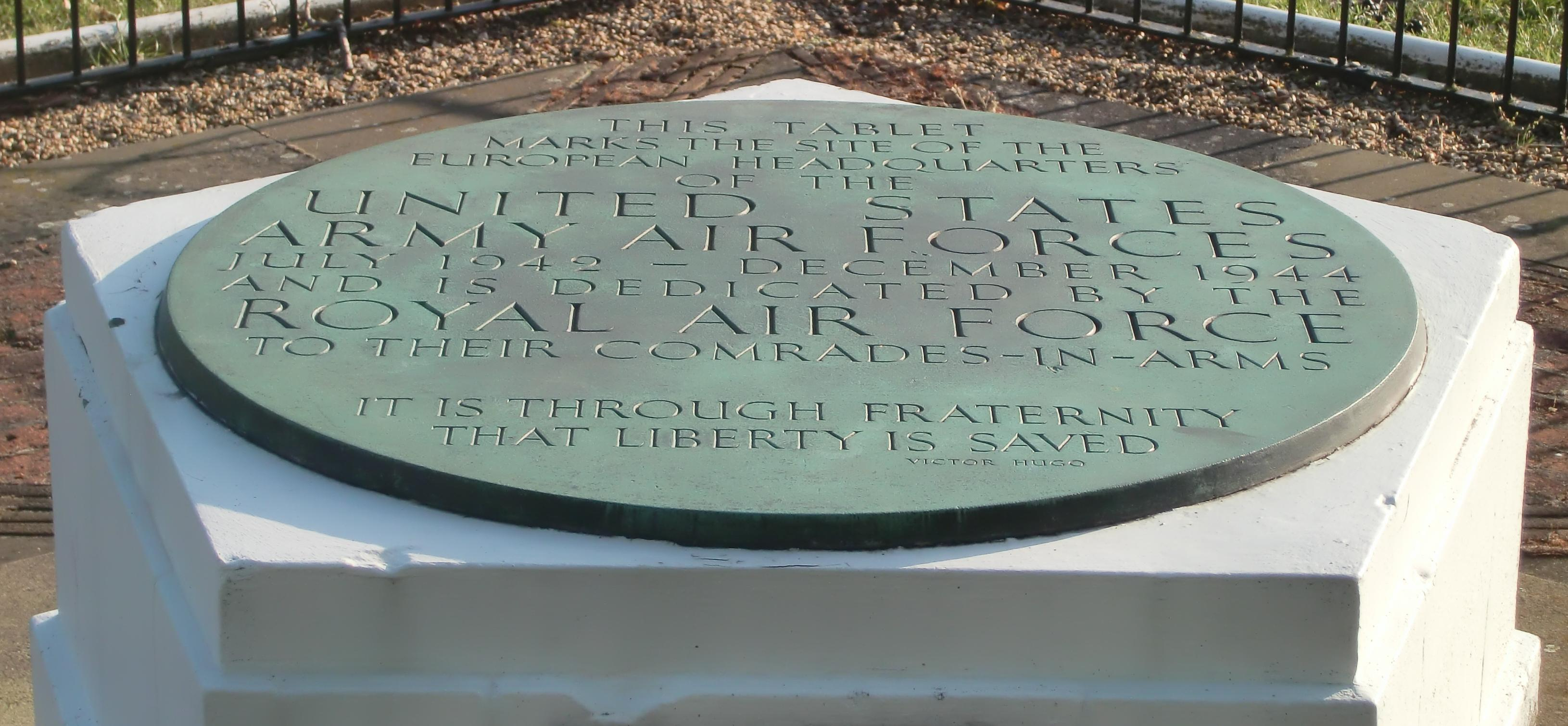
The tablet, erected by the RAF

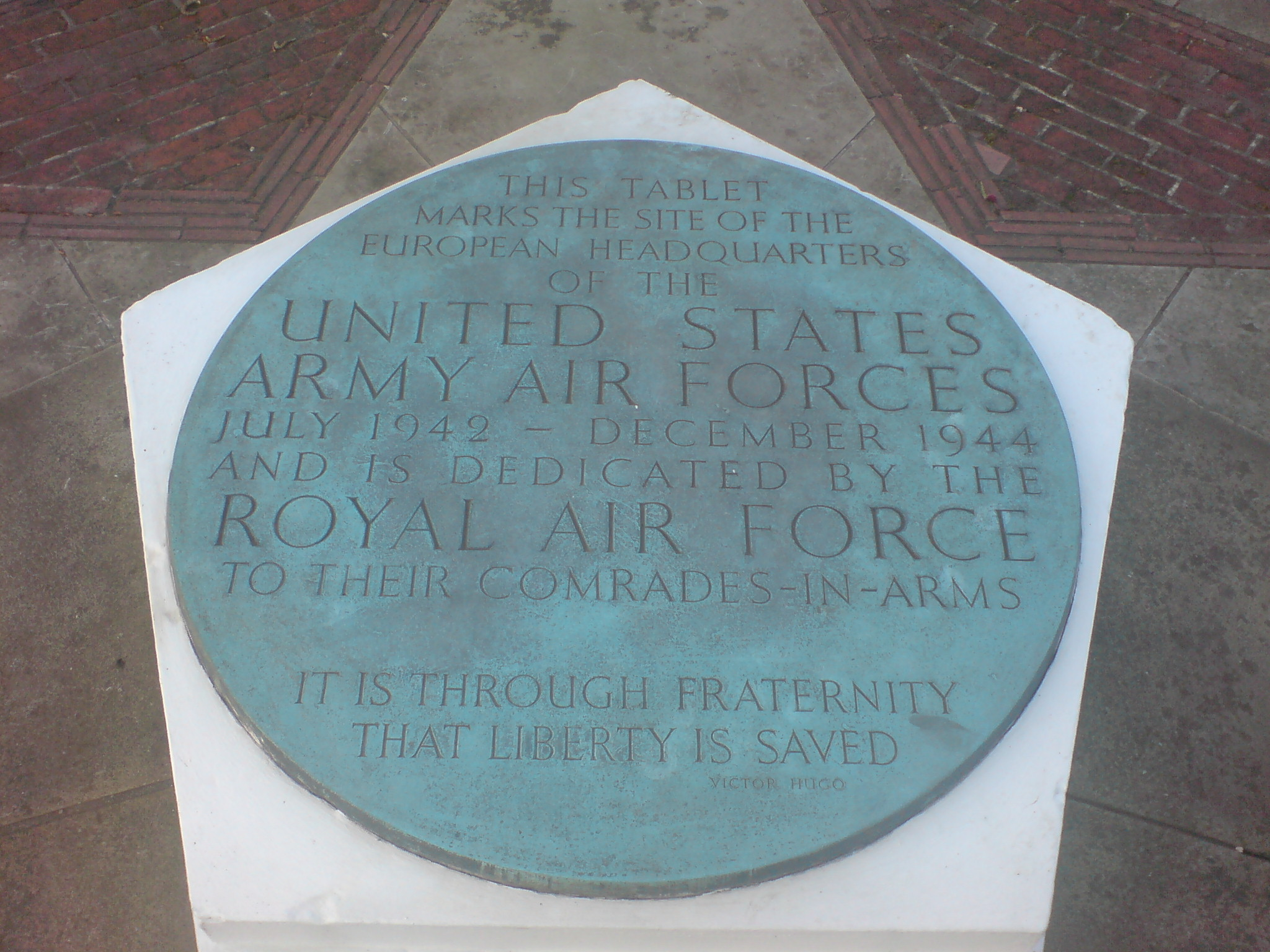
Plaque in Bushy Park marking the USAAF European HQ

The former site of Eisenhower's office is laid out in brick, with a memorial to SHAEF and a flagpole.

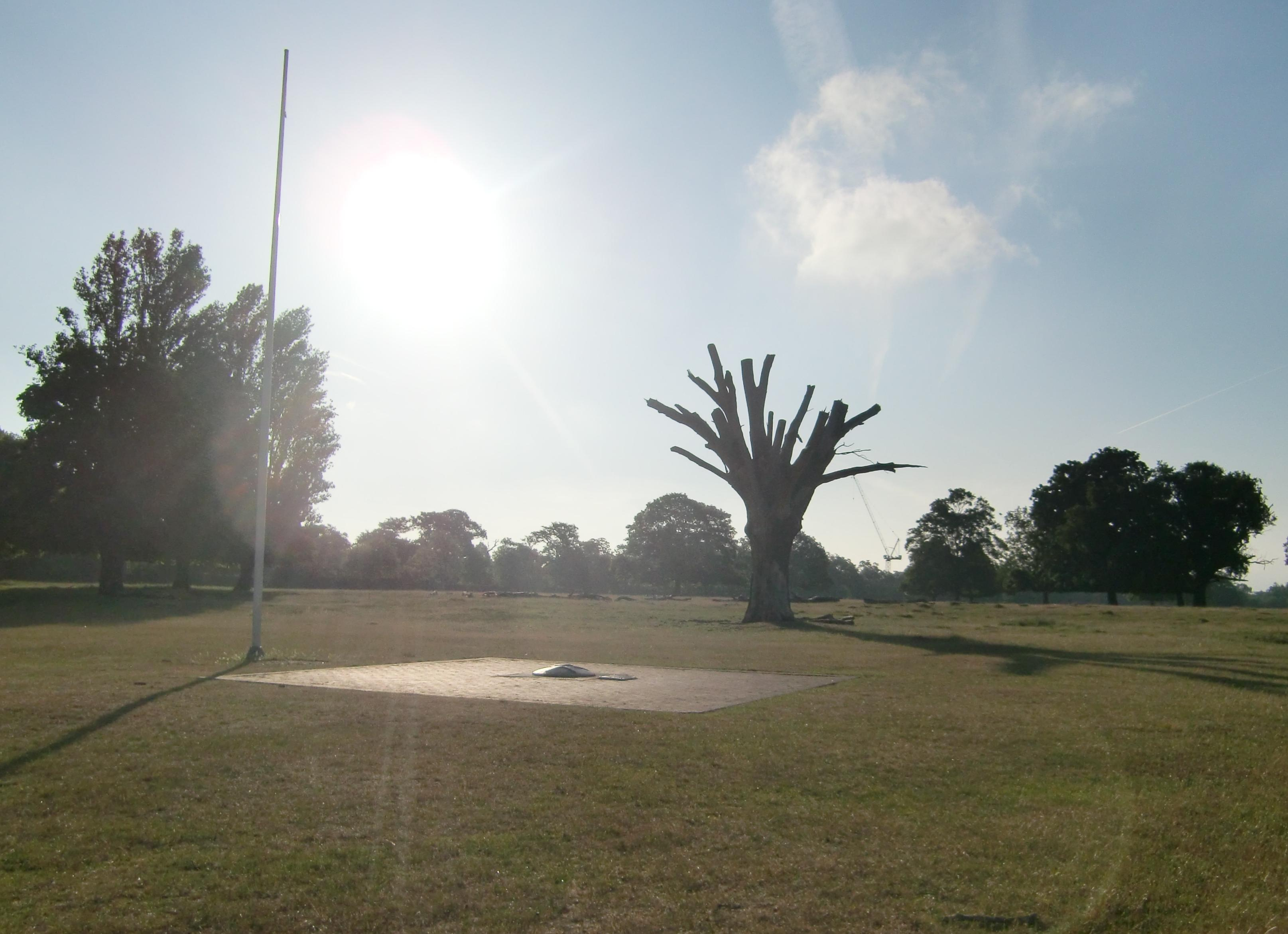
The site of Eisenhower's office is marked in brick with a flagpole

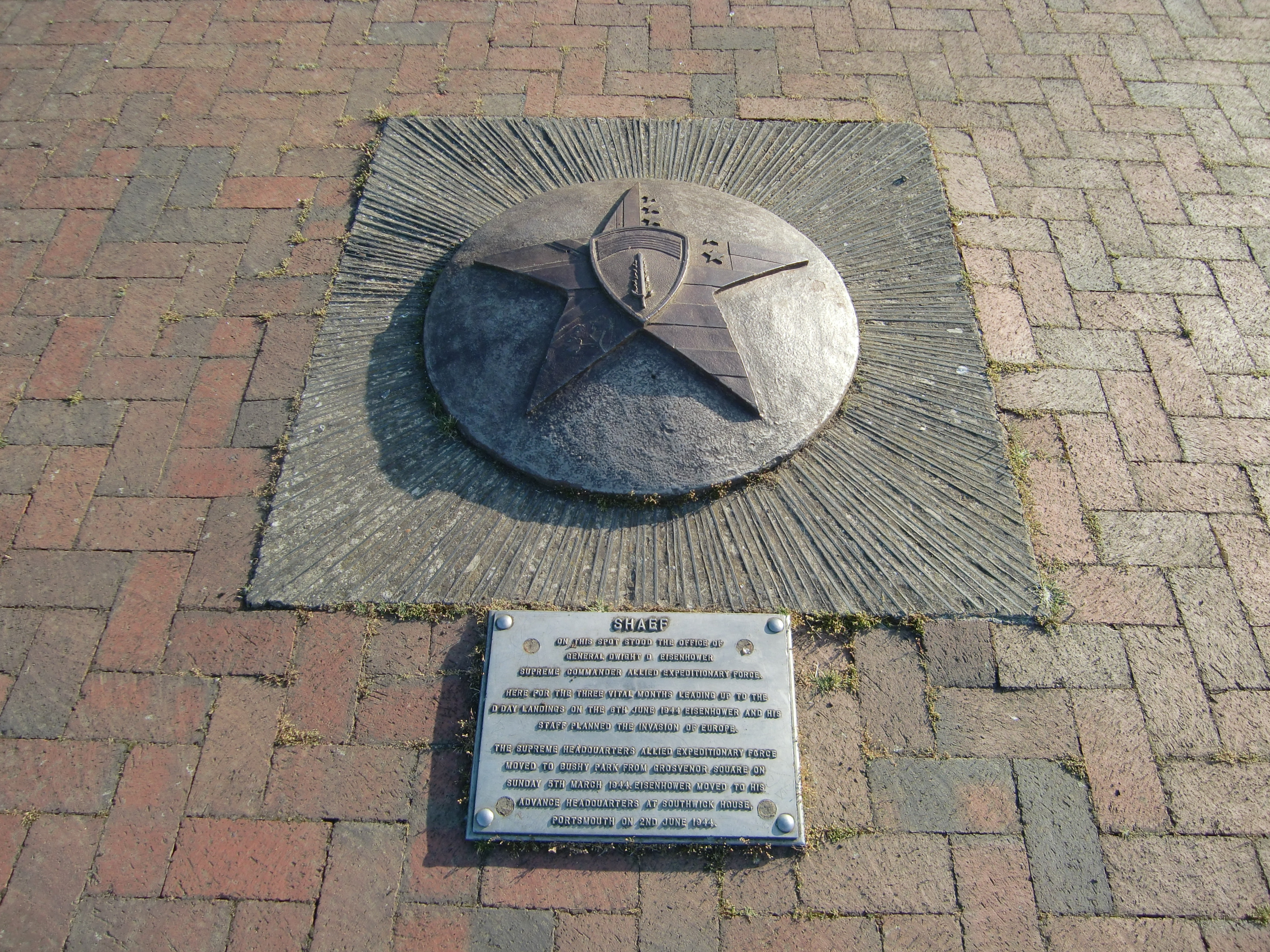
SHAEF memorial on the site of Eisenhower's tent

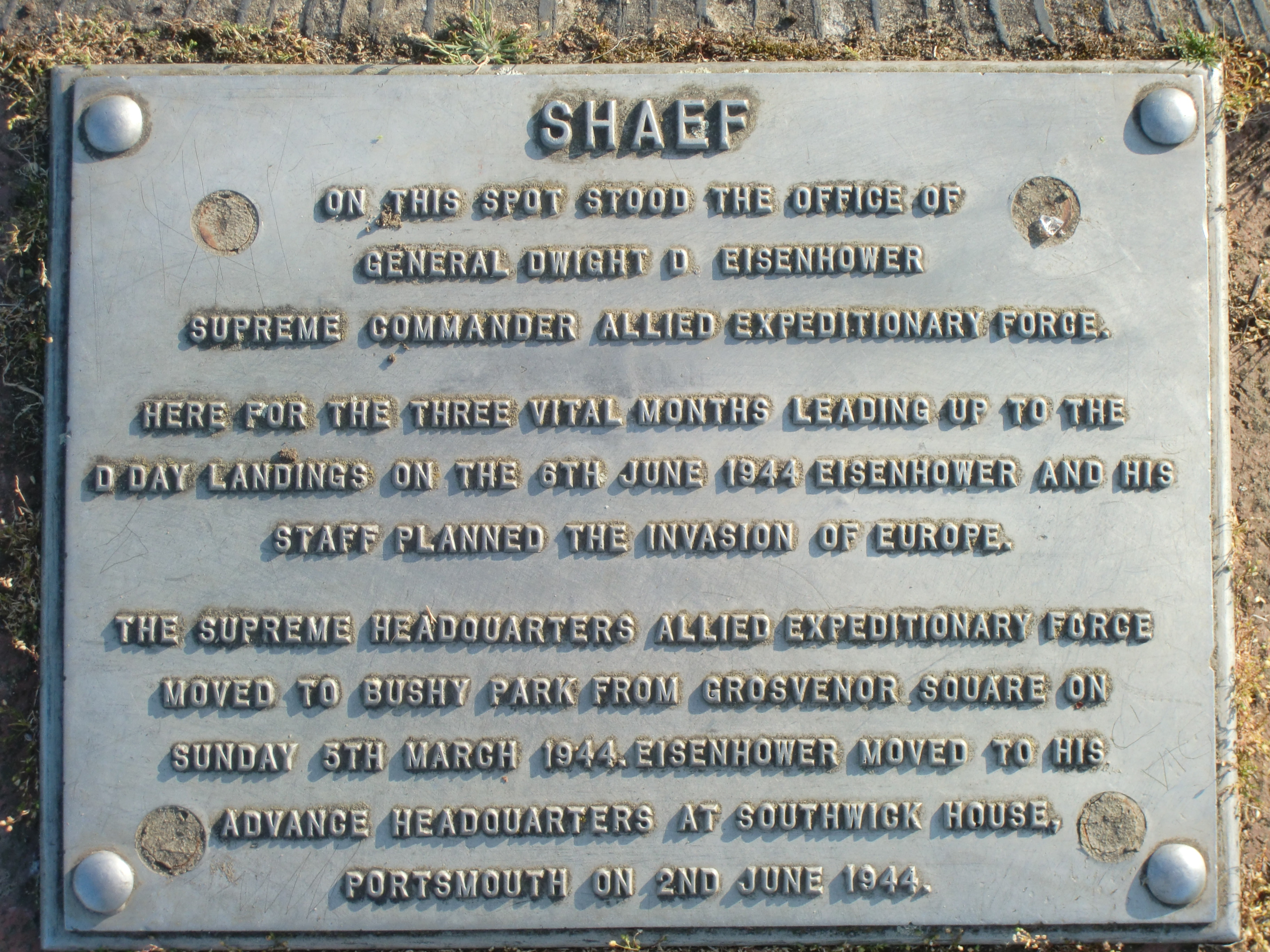
SHAEF plaque

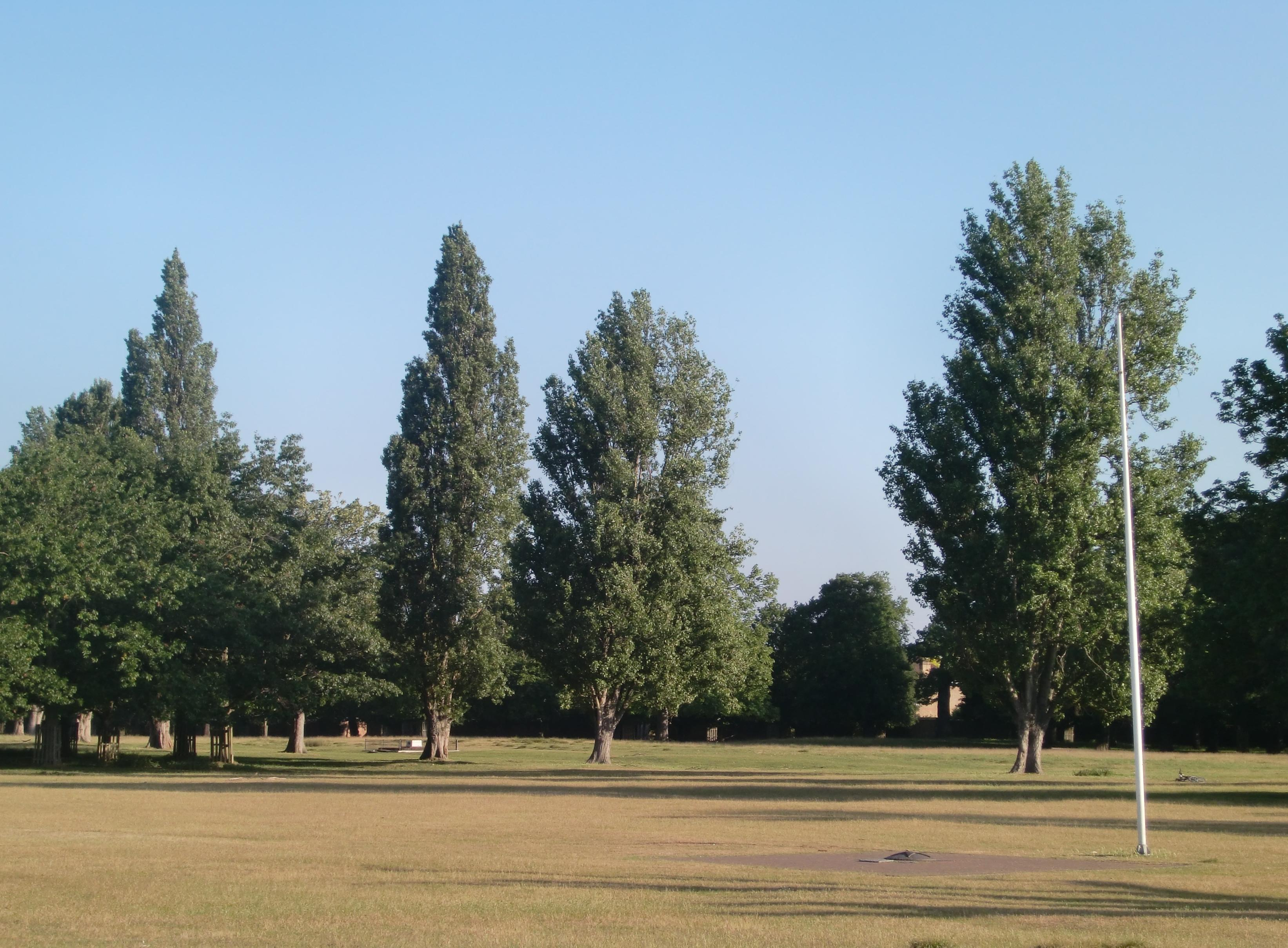
SHAEF memorial in foreground with USAAF memorial among the trees

Some American Forces had also been billeted at Upper Lodge in Bushy Park. When they departed they left a concrete obelisk with this inscription: 5 C D, TEXAS, 1942.
