= The Naked Ladies =

Ensemble of sculptures in Twickenham, London

Coordinates: 51°26′48.30″N 0°19′26.50″W

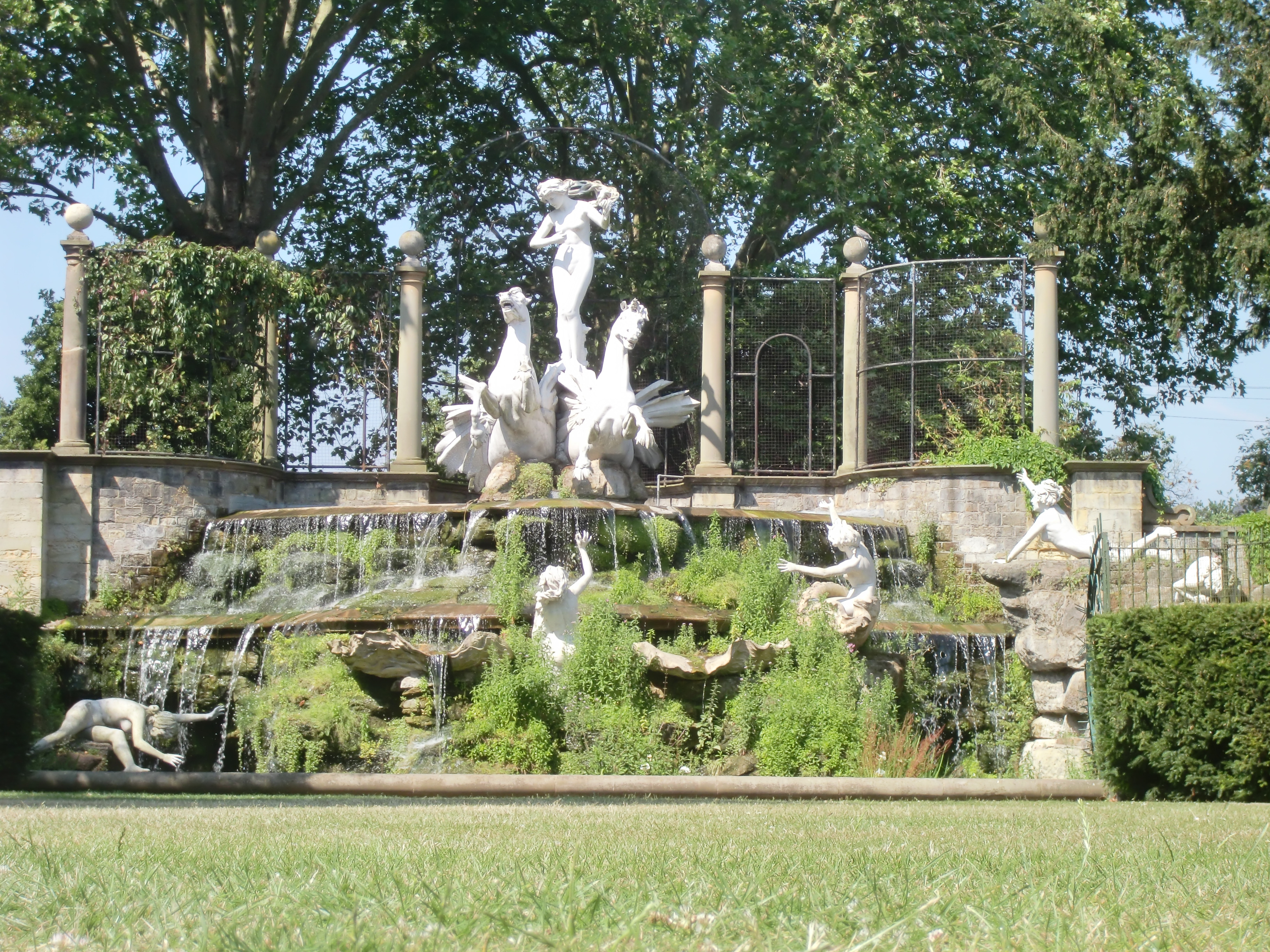
- Frontal view, "topped by an Oceanid and two horses"

- Location within London Borough of Richmond upon Thames

General information
- Type: Statue complex on a rockery and water cascade
- Location: The gardens of York House, Twickenham, in the London Borough of Richmond upon Thames

Listed Building – Grade II
- Official name: Fountain at west end of York House Gardens
- Designated: 25 May 1983
- Reference no.: 1250324

The Naked Ladies are a Grade II listed statue complex on a rockery and water cascade in the gardens of York House, Twickenham, in the London Borough of Richmond upon Thames, England. The larger than human size statues depict eight Oceanids and a pair of aquatic horses. They were carved in the fin de siècle style from white Carrara marble and probably came from Italy in the late nineteenth century or very early twentieth century. Originally they were part of a larger set of statues that was subdivided after the death of the initial purchaser.

After a somewhat unpromising start, they were installed in their current location without the benefit of the original design for their display. The statues spent several years as the backdrop for some of London's grandest garden parties. They subsequently passed by default into public ownership, and suffered some vandalism, but have been restored and remain to this day on view in the corner of a municipal garden.

== Design ==
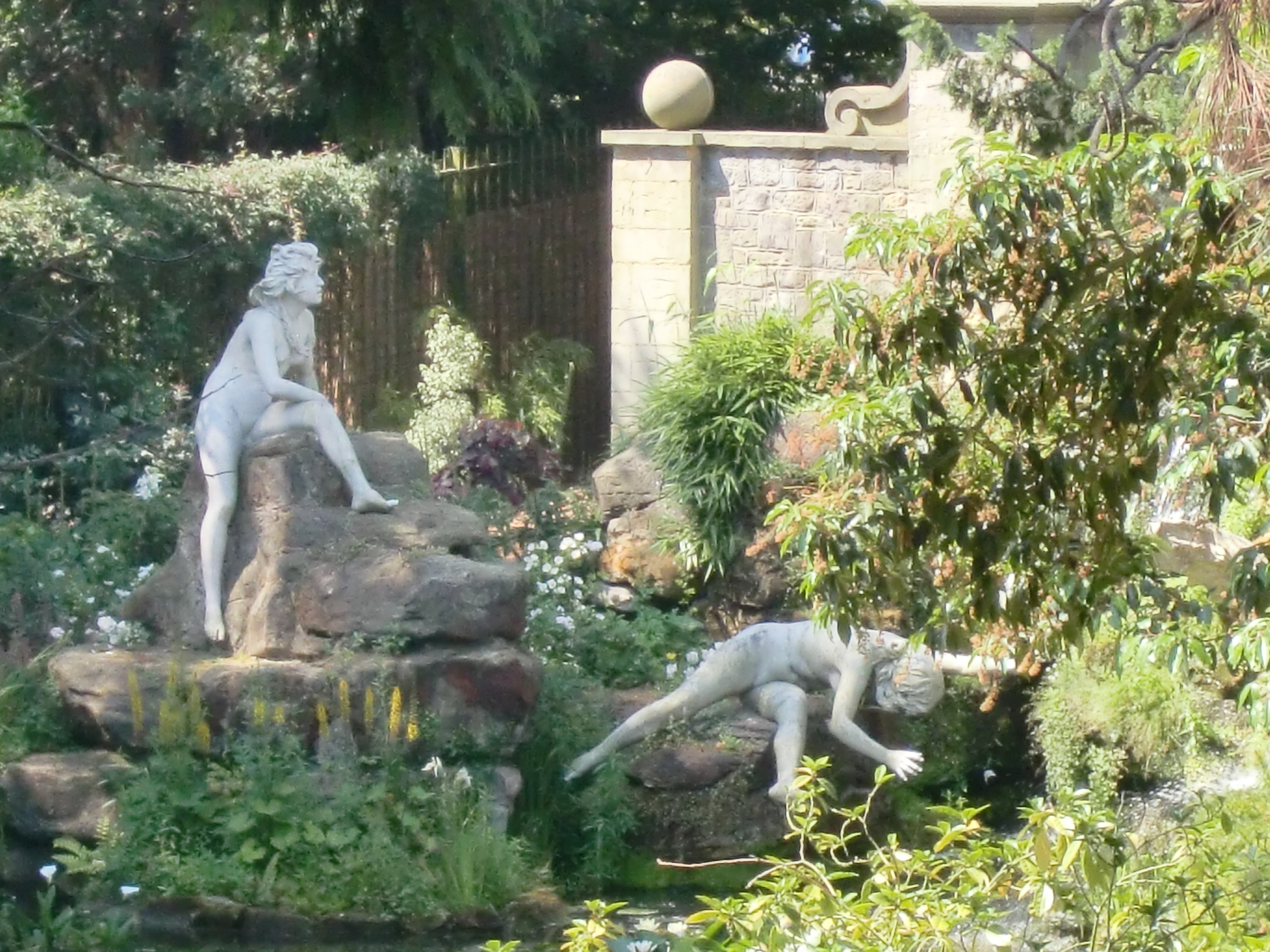
The statues were installed without benefit of instruction from the designer as he spoke no English.

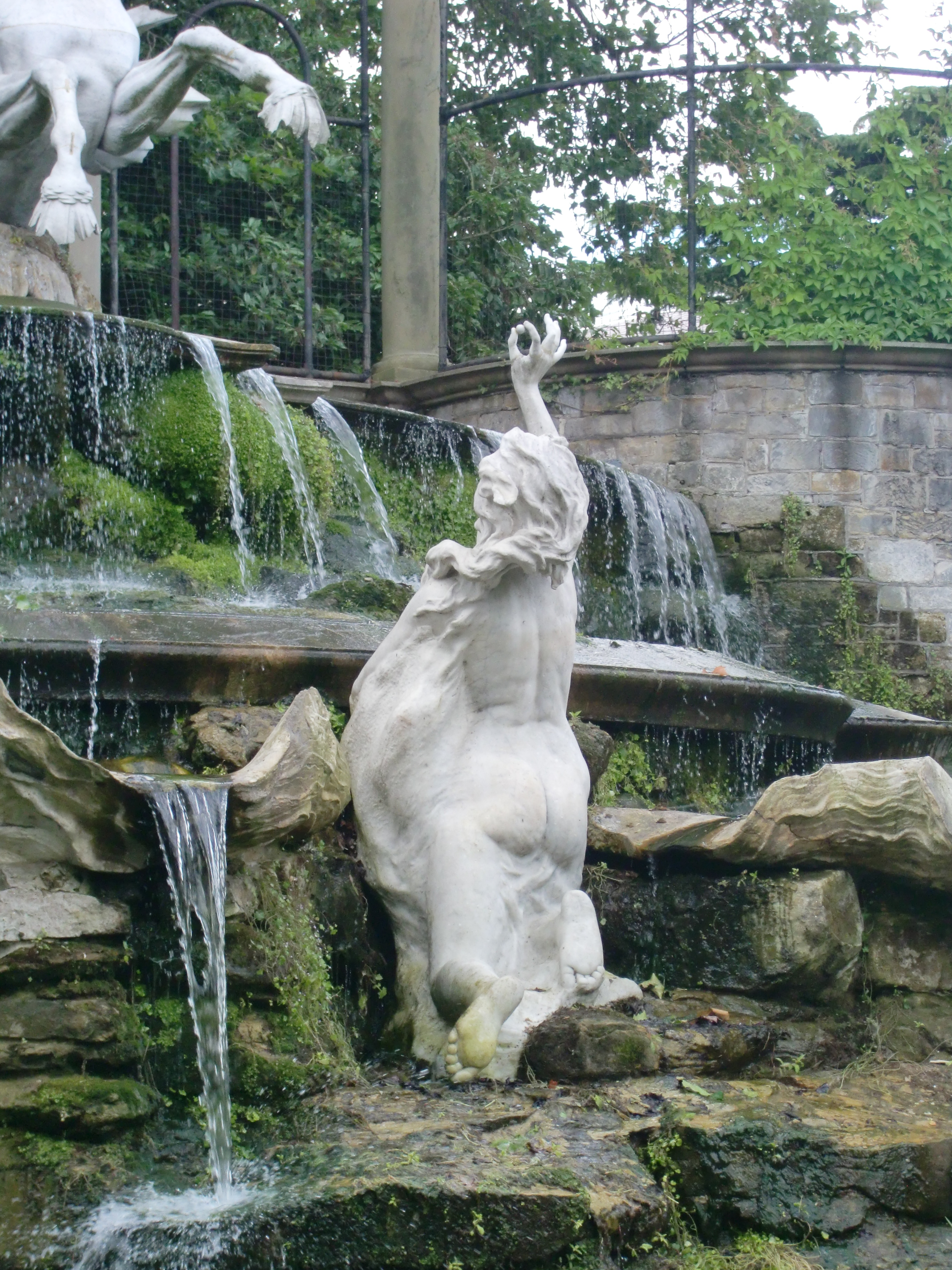
Another suggested name for the statues was the Pearl Fishers, but today only one lady still has a pearl.

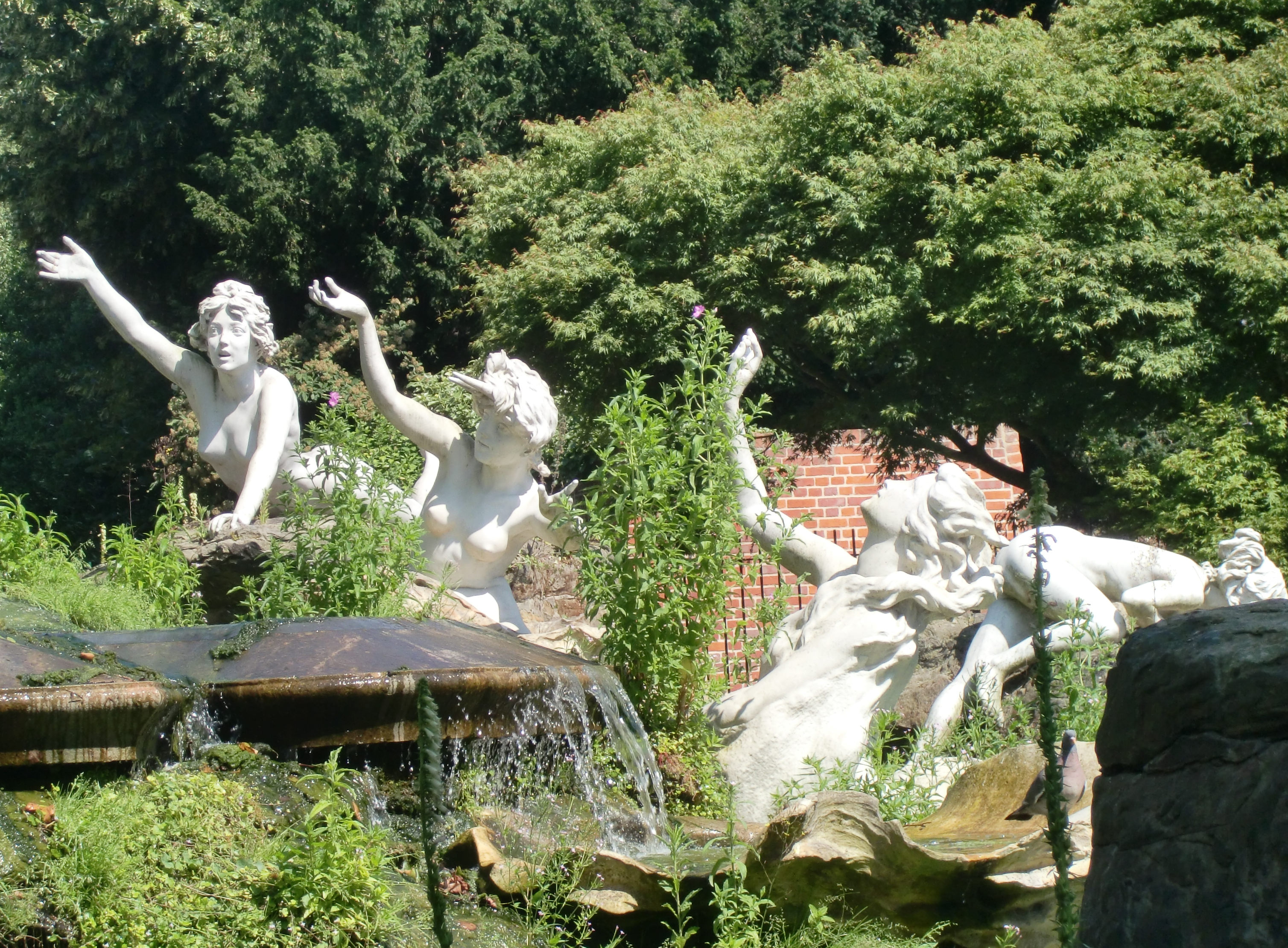
Side view of ladies in unusual poses

The statues are of Italian design, and come from Carrara. They are of a monumental scale with several of the individual blocks weighing over 5 long tons (5 t).

The sculptures were acquired during the disposal of the property of the original owner after his death. Due to the unusual circumstances of their acquisition they had become separated from any instructions as to their intended layout, and also from at least one other group of statues in what was originally intended to be a larger statue complex or complexes.

The rockery was designed and the whole complex installed by the British company of J Cheal & Sons who had to make their own interpretation as to the intended layout of the statues. Though they were able to incorporate all the statues into one tableau, their interpretation of the sculptor's intended design has led to comments about the unusual poses of some of the statues, especially when viewed from the side.

Originally some of the ladies were holding pearls, but much of this detail has now been lost. There have been various theories as to the intended subject matter, with Pearl Fishers, Pegasus, Naiads and the birth of Venus all having been suggested in addition to the usual attribution as Oceanids. For want of anything more official, they have become known as The Naked Ladies.

== Setting ==
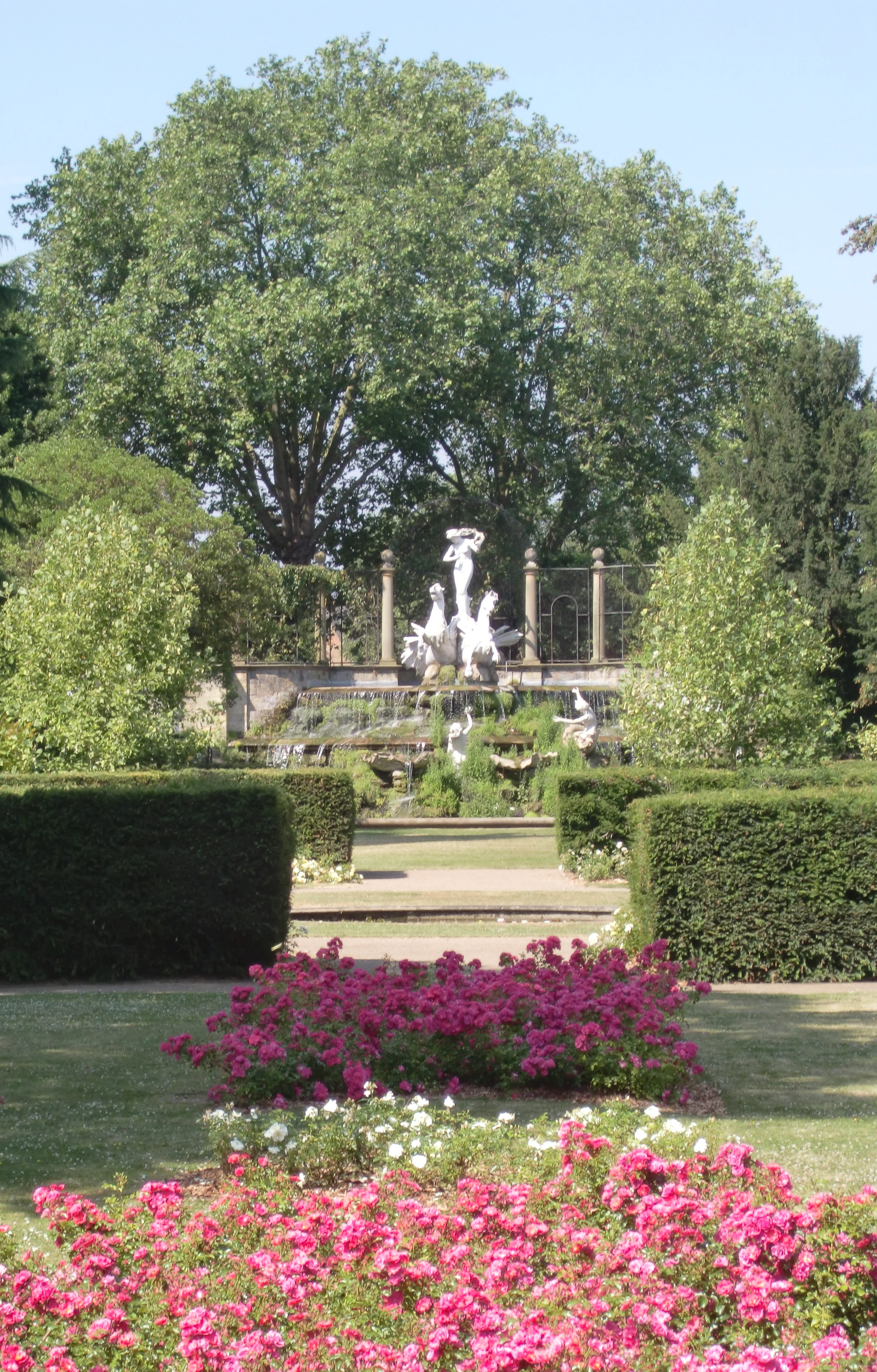
The Naked Ladies towering over the riverside lawns

The complex is in the gardens of York House by the banks of the River Thames. The gardens have been laid out in an Italian style to give unrestricted frontal views of the statue complex from the entire width of the gardens. The statues are set in a rockery behind a pond, with trees and security fencing restricting side and rear views.

== History ==
=== Whitaker Wright ===
The statues were amongst the property of the celebrated fraudster Whitaker Wright. It is not certain where he acquired the statues, or who carved them. After his death much of his collection was sold from Witley Park, including the Naked Ladies and also some mounted nymphs of a similar style, which went to Beale Park. One of the latter bore the mark "O SPALMACH, STUDIO O ANDREONI, ROMA.", identifying the studio of the Roman sculptor Orazio Andreoni, so it is possible that they were all sculpted there by Oscar Spalmach.

=== Sir Ratan Tata ===
The statues were acquired from Witley Park and brought to their current location by Sir Ratanji Dadabhoy Tata. Sir Ratan had bought York House from Prince Philippe, Duke of Orléans in 1906, and by the end of 1909 he had had the Riverside gardens redesigned in the Italian style and the statues installed.

Sir Ratan was for several years a noted host for London High Society, with King George V among the guests at his garden parties.

=== Twickenham Council ===
The statues came into the de facto possession of Twickenham Council in 1924 when they purchased York House for their new town hall. The statues had been left behind by the previous owners, as they had been unable to find a buyer despite putting them up for auction.

=== Hiding the statues in the Blitz ===
In the Blitz during the Second World War, there was concern that moonlight reflecting on the statues would give a navigation mark to the Luftwaffe. So as part of London's Blackout measures the statues were covered with a "grey sludge".

=== Modern times ===
As a result of local government reorganisation in the 1960s Twickenham became part of the London Borough of Richmond upon Thames, but the town hall remains at York House and the gardens continue to be open to the public. The statues have gone through at least one major restoration to remove graffiti and the wartime grey cement, and reverse the effects of vandalism by replacing lost fingers, pearls and even a hoof. The statues are now protected with a Grade II listing by Historic England.

== Society and culture ==
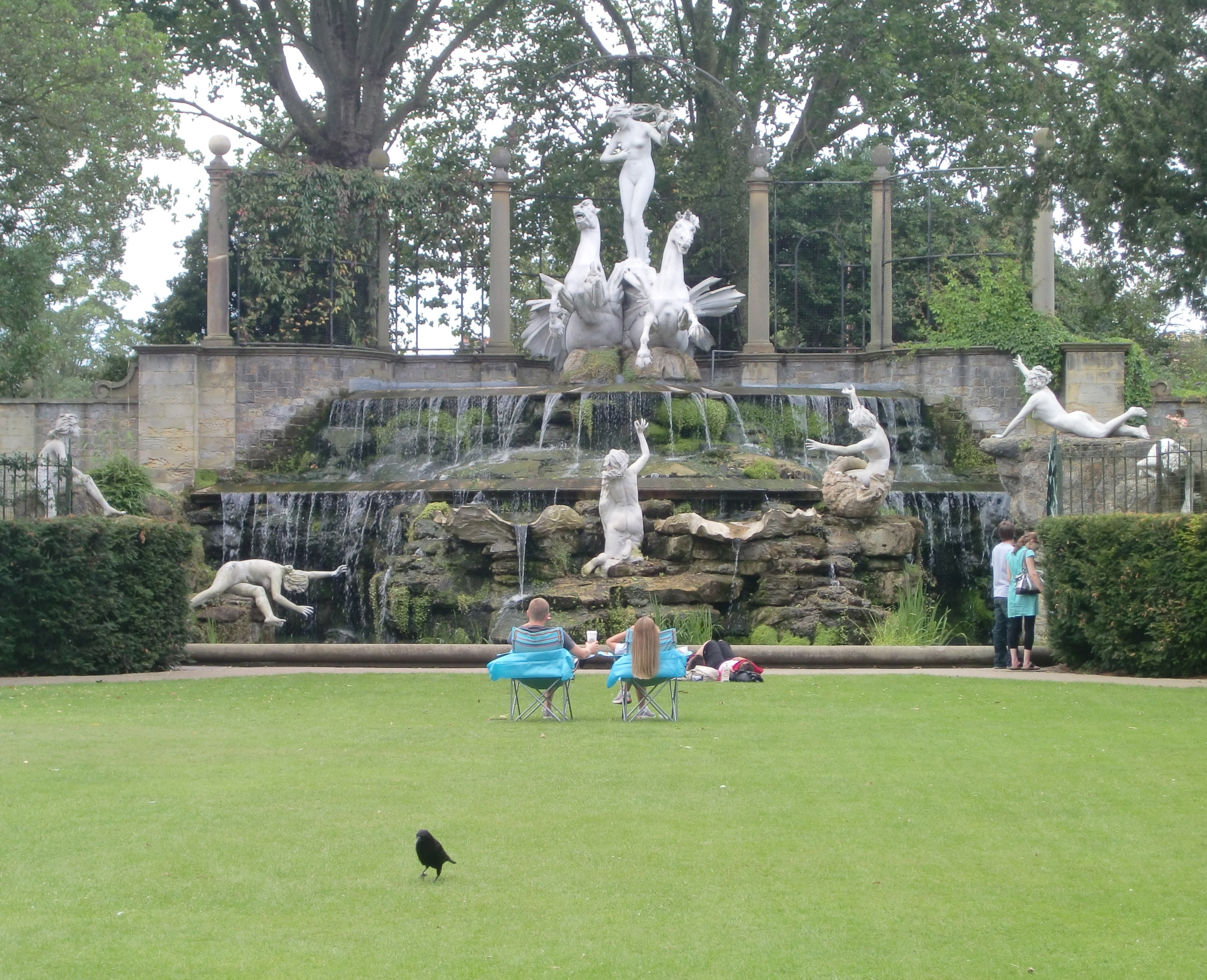
The larger than life statues are now in a public park

The Naked Ladies are one of the visitor attractions of Twickenham, have a beer named after them, and are a popular backdrop for wedding photos.

== Gallery ==
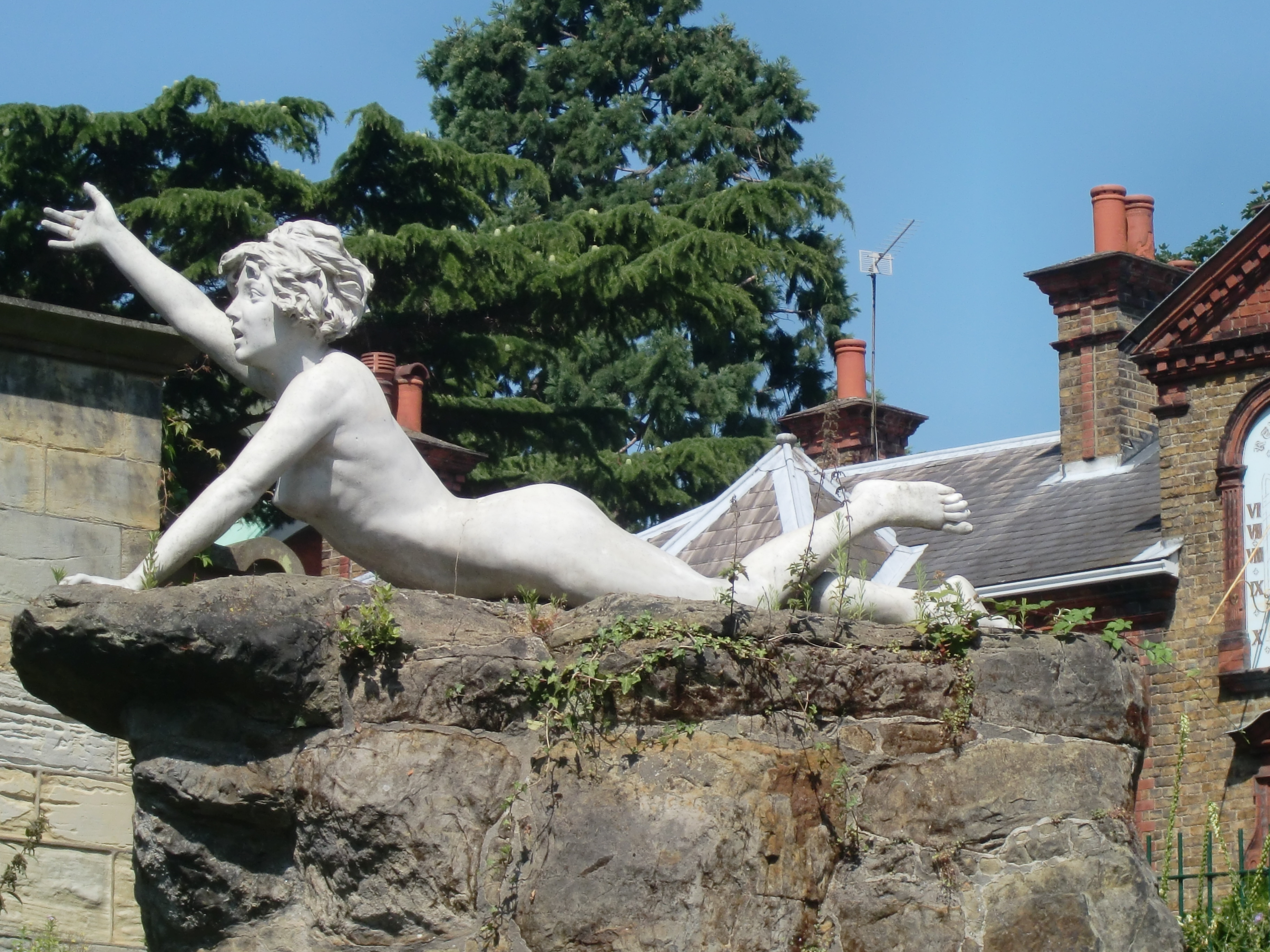
Nobody bid for the statues in the 1922 auction.

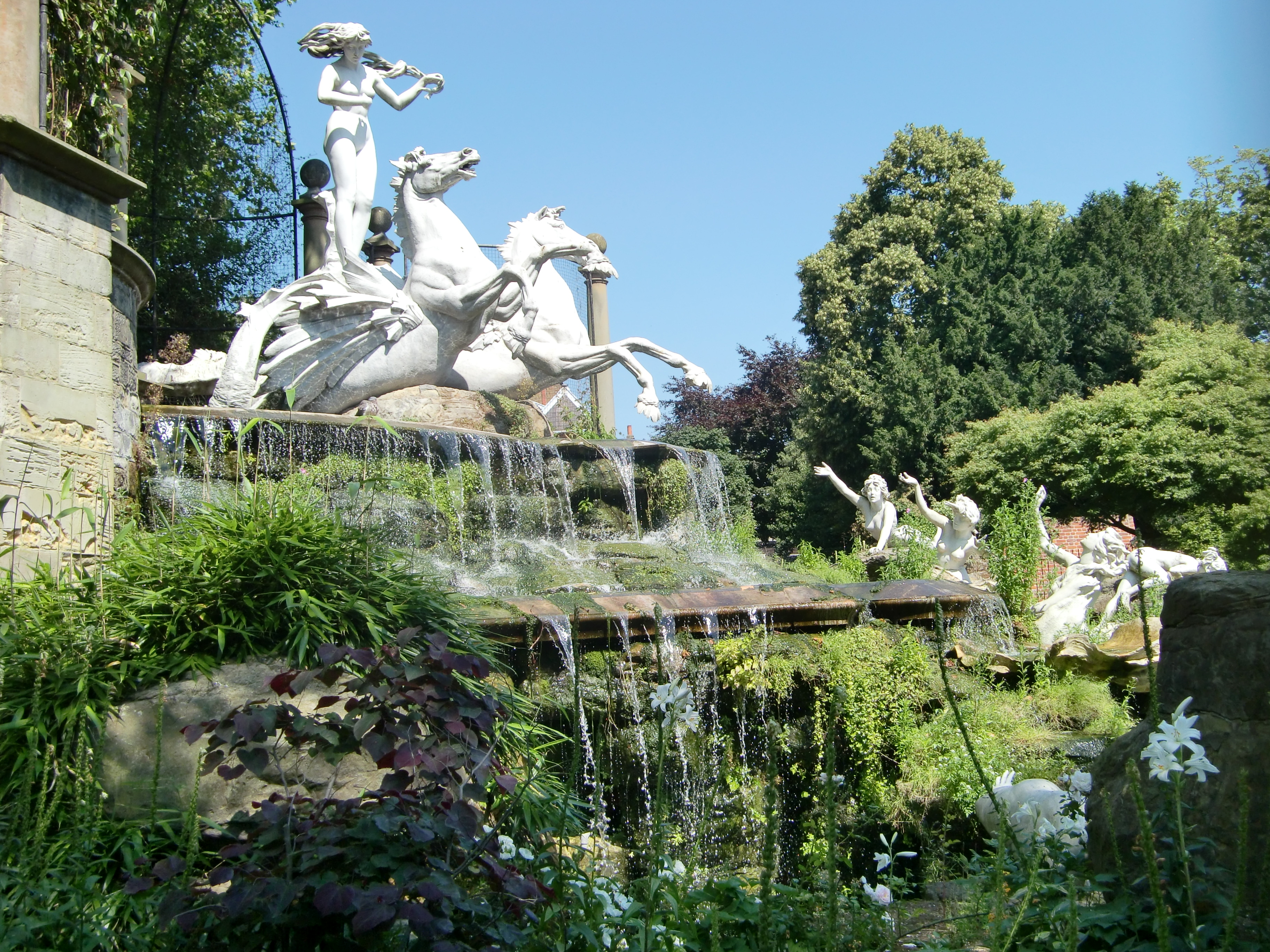
Profile view of complex showing cascade and dappling effect of reflections from the pool on the horses' wings

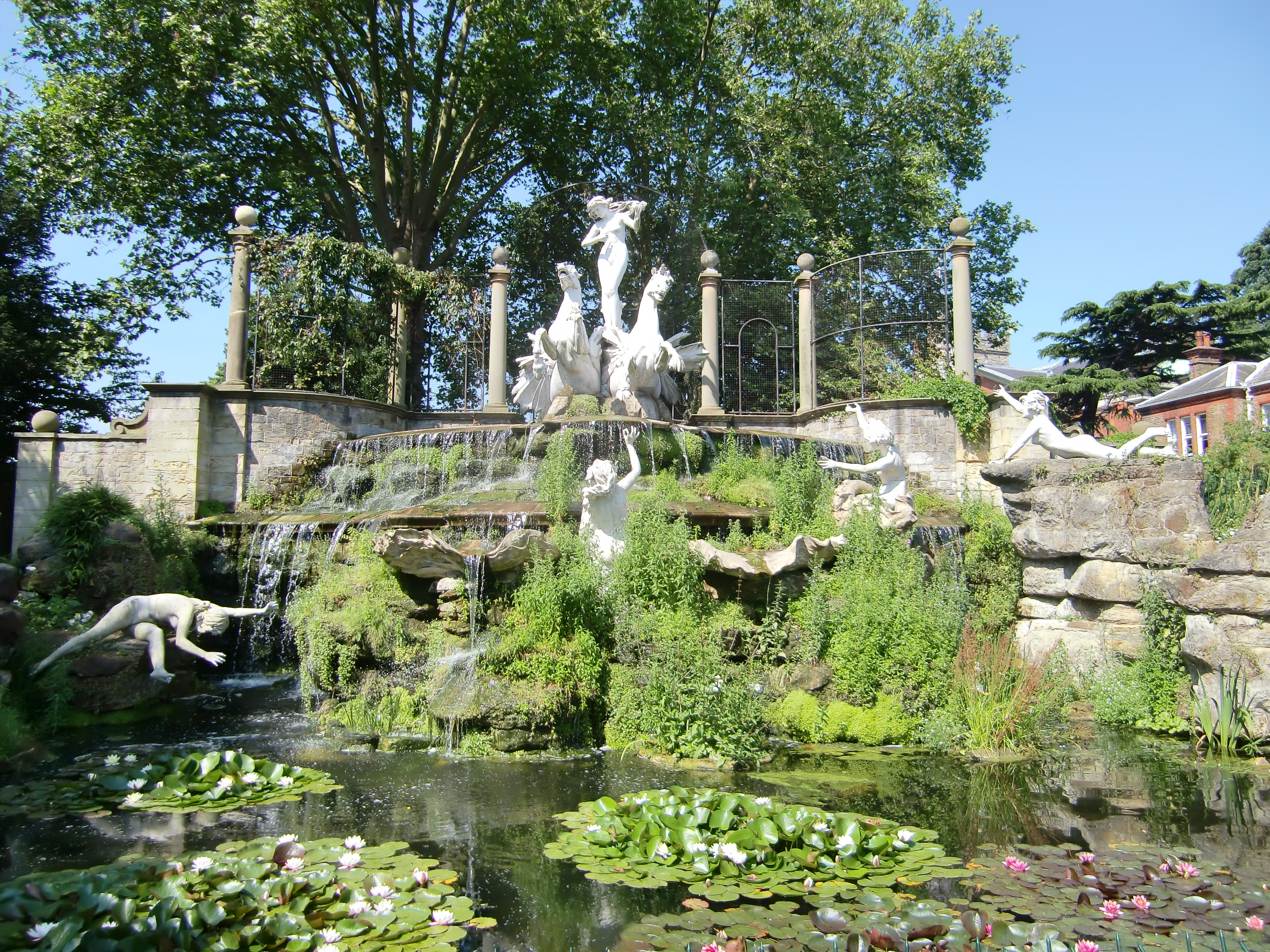
View of pond, with water lilies

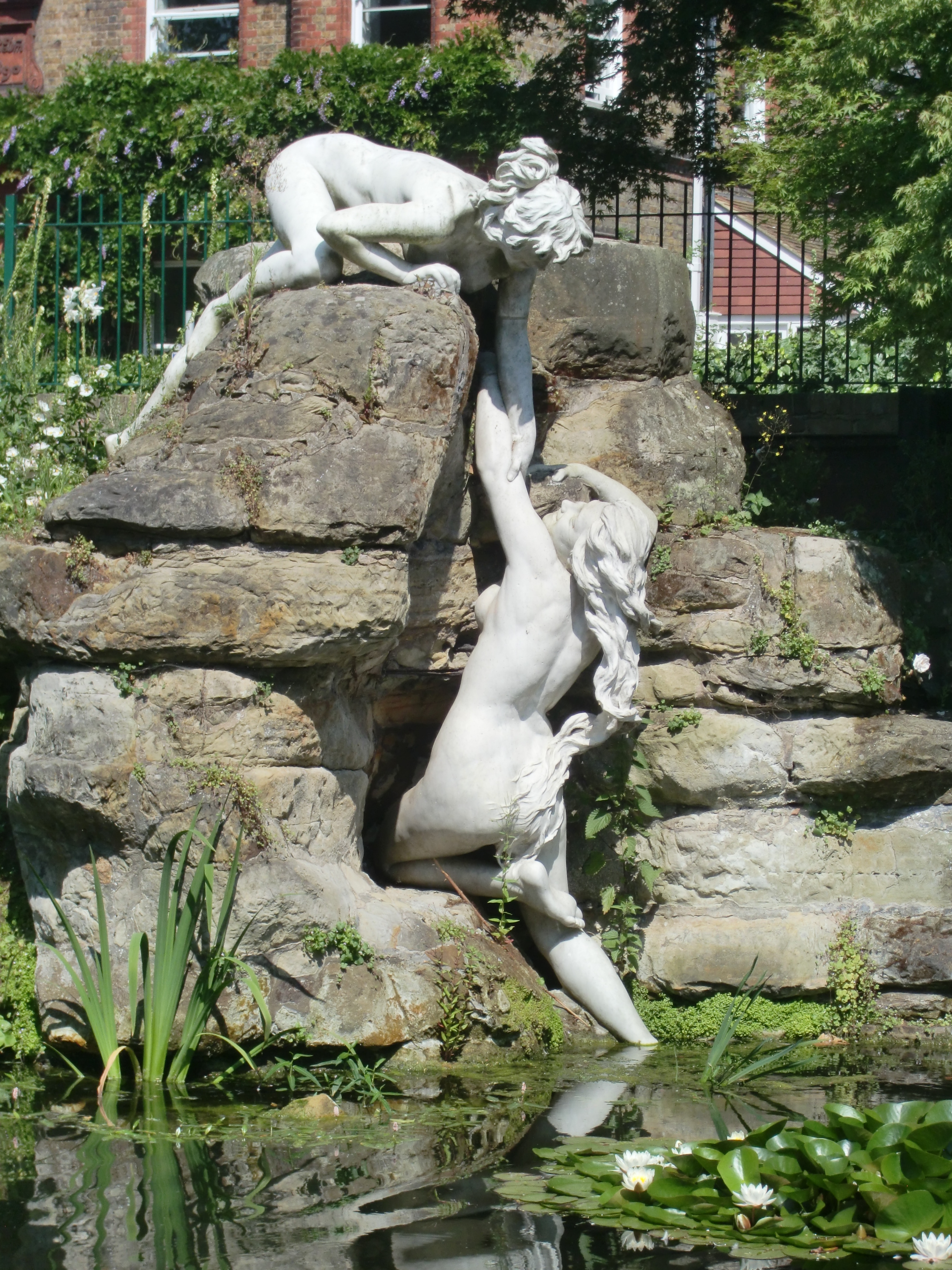
One lady helping another out of the pond (the arm of the upper lady is carved as part of the lower sculpture)

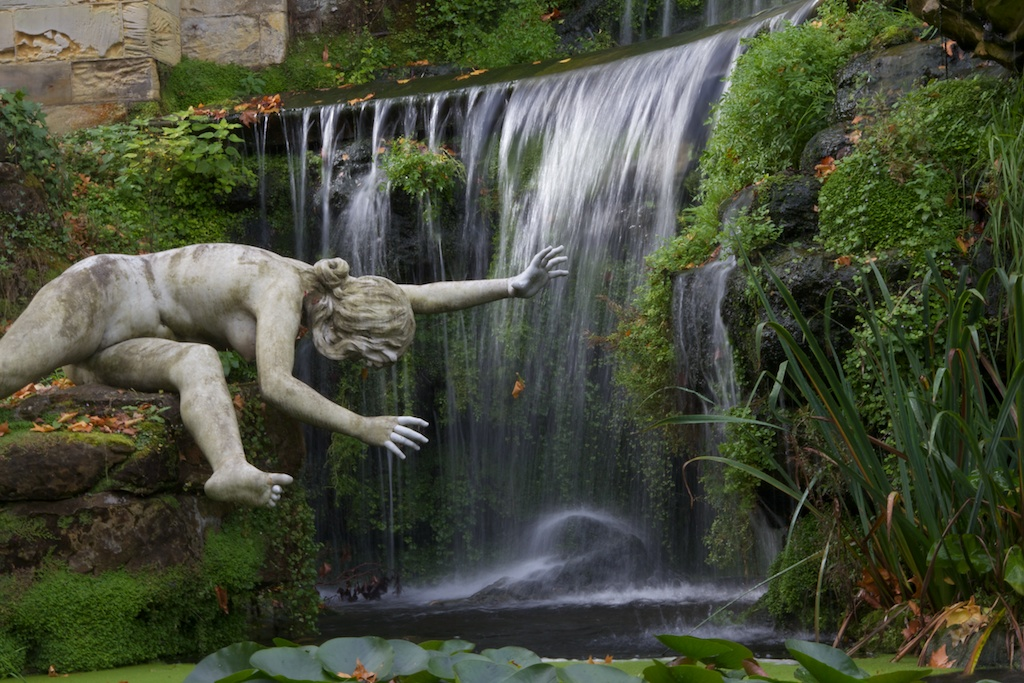
One of the Ladies reaching out for something, in front of part of the water cascade

== See also ==
- List of public art in Richmond upon Thames
- Twickenham Fine Ales
