= Douglas Wellesley Morrell =

English electrical engineer

Douglas Wellesley Morrell CBE
- Born: Douglas Wellesley Morrell; 6 February 1917; Plymouth, Devonshire, England
- Died: 6 February 1996 (aged 79); Portugal
- Occupations: Deputy managing director, Racal

Douglas Wellesley Morrell CBE, (6 February 1917 – 6 February 1996) was an English electrical engineer and deputy managing director of Racal.

== Early life and education ==
Morrell was born in Plymouth on 6 February 1917, but was adopted and baptised nearly a year later, on 9 January 1918, as Douglas Wellesley Morrell at Emmanuel, Compton Gifford, Plymouth, Devon. His father, Arthur Wellesley Morrell, was a paymaster for the Royal Navy at the Plymouth Dockyard.

Morrell was educated at Dauntsey's School in Wiltshire, and later at Faraday House in London, where he earned a Bachelor of Science (engineering) with honours, as well as a gold medal.

== Career ==
Morrell joined Marconi as an installation engineer in 1938, and would go on to travel around the British Empire throughout the war years installing radio direction-finding equipment as part of the war effort.

After the war, he went on to work for Redifon as a sales engineer. It was with Redifon that he met Ray Brown, who would eventually join Calder Cunningham in starting Racal in 1950.

In April 1953, he left Redifon to join Racal as their first sales manager, at the invitation of Ray Brown. Morrell became an investor and joined the board of directors in 1955. He was instrumental in negotiating an exclusive licensing agreement between Racal and the South African Council for Scientific and Industrial Research, which had invented an improved high-frequency receiver circuitry, in a Racal radio set that eventually "became the standard HF receiver for all the armed forces and monitoring agencies of the United Kingdom".

When he retired in 1982, Morrell was a deputy managing director, though he remained closely involved in the company's activities during his early retirement in Germany.

During his lengthy career, Morrell became a member of the Society of British Aerospace Companies, and of the Institution of Electrical Engineers, having first joined as a Member in 1936, later becoming a Fellow in 1962.

Morrell was also a long-serving Liveryman with the Worshipful Company of Scientific Instrument Makers, having been first clothed in the livery on 14 November 1961.

== Honours ==
Morrell was Gazetted as a Commander of the Order of the British Empire in the 1982 Birthday Honours, following his retirement, and was invested later that year.
