= Oscar Spalmach =

Oscar Spalmach (16 July 1864 – 6 January 1917) was an Italian artist and sculptor.

Spalmach was born 16 July 1864 to Valentino Spalmach and Luigia Tonello.

After two years and 7 months of military service in Venice at the 1st Regiment of Grenadiers with the rank of corporal, he studied at the Royal Institute of Fine Arts in Venice, his home city. He received a certificate qualifying him to practice and teach sculpture in 1888 and then worked in Rome at Orazio Andreoni's studio.

Spalmach’s most famous works are the Oceanides marble sculpture in York House Garden, Twickenham and The Italian Fountain in Beale Park, Berkshire. He died in Parma, Italy on 6 January 1917.

== Works ==
- Oceanid Waterfall, commissioned by Whitaker Wright for his property in Lea Park (now Witley Park), York House Twickenham, London
- Fountain of the Naiads and hippocampuses, commissioned by Whitaker Wright for his property in Lea Park (now Witley Park), are now at Child-Beale Wildlife Park, in Pangbourne
- Love and psyche, made in the studio of Orazio Andreoni and now at The Richard H. Driehaus Museum in Chicago
- Mausoleum Cattani, funeral monument made for Daniele Cattani and Maria Mazzoni (1906-1909)
- Man and Mystery, Work exhibited at the 8th International Art Exhibition in Venice in 1909
- Couple of Lions at the entrance to the Fairbanks Museum, San Johnsbury, Vermont (USA)
