= Twickenham Fine Ales =

Brewery in London, England

- Handcrafted beers from
- Location: 18 Mereway Road Twickenham TW2 6RG
- Opened: 2004
- Owned by: Steve Brown
- Website: twickenham-fine-ales.co.uk

Active beers
Name	Type
Naked Ladies	Golden Ale
Red Sky	Red Ale
Grandstand	English-style Pale Ale

Seasonal beers
Name	Type
Spring Ale	Pale Ale
Summer Sun	Pale Ale
Autumn Red	Ruby Ale
Winter Star	Winter Ale

Twickenham Fine Ales is a microbrewery in Twickenham in the London Borough of Richmond upon Thames. Founded by Steve Brown in 2004, it claims to be the first brewery in Twickenham since the closure of Cole's Brewery in 1906. It opened in September 2004 and is now the oldest independent brewery in London. It has been brewing at its current premises in Mereway Road, Twickenham since December 2012.

Its range of ales includes Naked Ladies, named after the statues in the gardens of York House, Twickenham. A bottled version of this beer was launched in 2013.
