= York House =

York House may refer to:

== Royal residences ==
York House was traditionally the name given, often temporarily, to houses in London, England occupied by holders of the title of Duke of York:

- Albany (London) in Piccadilly
- Cumberland House in Pall Mall
- Dover House in Whitehall
- Lancaster House in Pall Mall
- York House, St James's Palace, a wing of St. James's Palace

== Other structures ==
in Canada

- York House School at Vancouver, British Columbia

in England

- York House, Malton in North Yorkshire
- York House School, Redheath, Croxley Green, Hertfordshire
- York House, Strand in the Strand, London
- York House, Twickenham in the London suburb of Twickenham, which now serves as the town hall, a tourist attraction, wedding venue and filming location
- York House, Waterloo, an office building in Lambeth, London

in Grenada

- York House, Grenada, the former home of the Grenadian Parliament

in Hong Kong

- York House, Hong Kong in The Landmark, Hong Kong, see Hongkong Land

in the United States

- York House (Napa, California)
- York House (Mountain City, Georgia), listed on the NRHP in Georgia
- York House (Pikeville, Kentucky), listed on the NRHP in Kentucky
- York Mansion, Pikeville, Kentucky, listed on the NRHP in Kentucky
- York-Skinner House, Westfield, New York
- York-Gordon House, New Bern, North Carolina, listed on the NRHP in North Carolina
