= Raymond Frederick Brown =

Sir Raymond Brown OBE
- Born: Raymond Frederick Brown; 19 July 1920; Greenwich, London, England
- Died: 3 September 1991 (aged 71); Witley, Surrey, England
- Occupation: Co-founder of electronics group Racal

Sir Raymond Frederick Brown OBE (July 19, 1920 – September 3, 1991), along with his partner George Calder Cunningham, was the founder of Racal, and the British government's chief arms salesman from 1966 to 1969.

Brown was born at 4 Nettleton Road, Greenwich, London, and started work as a tea boy at the age of 14.

== Formation and early years of Racal Electronics ==
In 1950 he and his partner George Calder 'Jock' Cunningham founded Racal (the name was formed using the first two letters of Brown's name and the first three letters of Calder Cunningham's name to create the name 'RA CAL'), which gradually grew to become a major supplier of military radios and telecommunications equipment with Brown as its Managing Director. Brown had previously worked for the electronics company Plessey and Cunningham was an ex-RAF Wing Commander.

In 1966, the year in which Ernest Harrison took over as chairman, Brown was asked to join the Ministry of Defence as 'Head of Defence Sales' in the newly created Defence Sales Organisation (DSO) set up by Denis Healey, the Secretary of State for Defence at the time (1964-1970). It was with the DSO that Brown was given wide latitude to promote British arms exports.

In 1985 the organisation became renamed as the Defence & Security Organisation although was eventually closed by Prime Minister Gordon Brown in 2007.

== Accusations of bribery to advance sales ==
According to The Guardian, his office explicitly participated in bribery to advance sales, as noted in the Guardian-supplied quotations below. When one British ambassador's deputy inquired:

"My ambassador feels we must have a clear answer to this – are HMG prepared, through an agent, to enter into a government-to-government contract in the negotiation of which there will have been an element of bribery and which will itself reflect this bribery (though in a concealed form) in that the price will include hidden commissions of one sort or another?"

The response was as follows:

"The answer is Yes," scrawled one civil servant back in London. "It is up to the agent to deploy his money as he sees fit."

Added Harold Hubert, the director of army sales in the Defence Sales Organisation (DSO):

"People who deal with the arms trade, even if they are sitting in a government office, live day by day with this sort of activity, and equally day by day they carry out transactions knowing that at some point bribery is involved. Obviously, I and my colleagues in this office do not ourselves engage in it, but we believe that various people who are somewhere along the chain of our transactions do. They do not tell us what they are doing and we do not inquire. We are interested in the end result."

Within a few years, Brown became frustrated with the British government's efforts to limit such activities. Although Denis Healey attempted to ease him out of his government position, Brown served out his full term and in his four years of tenure he succeeded in selling £850m worth of weapons and military equipment, well above the £200m target set by Healey.

== Later management posts ==
Brown subsequently managed Muirhead Ltd., and served as a director of the Standard Telephones and Cables company.

== Personal life and death ==
Brown was married to Lady Carol Brown (born November, 1931). He purchased Witley Park between Godalming and Haselmere, Surrey in 1982, along with Lady Brown, where he lived until his death. In 2002 the Brown family sold the 450 acres of walled-off Parkland, Gate Lodges and Cottages, retaining Witley Park Farm to the south. It was in 2002 that Lady Brown resigned as Director of Witley Park Estates Limited. Ray Brown is buried nearby in the All Saints Churchyard, Witley, Surrey.
