= York House, St James's Palace =

Historic wing of St James's Palace in London

Coordinates: 51°30′17″N 0°8′18″W

York House
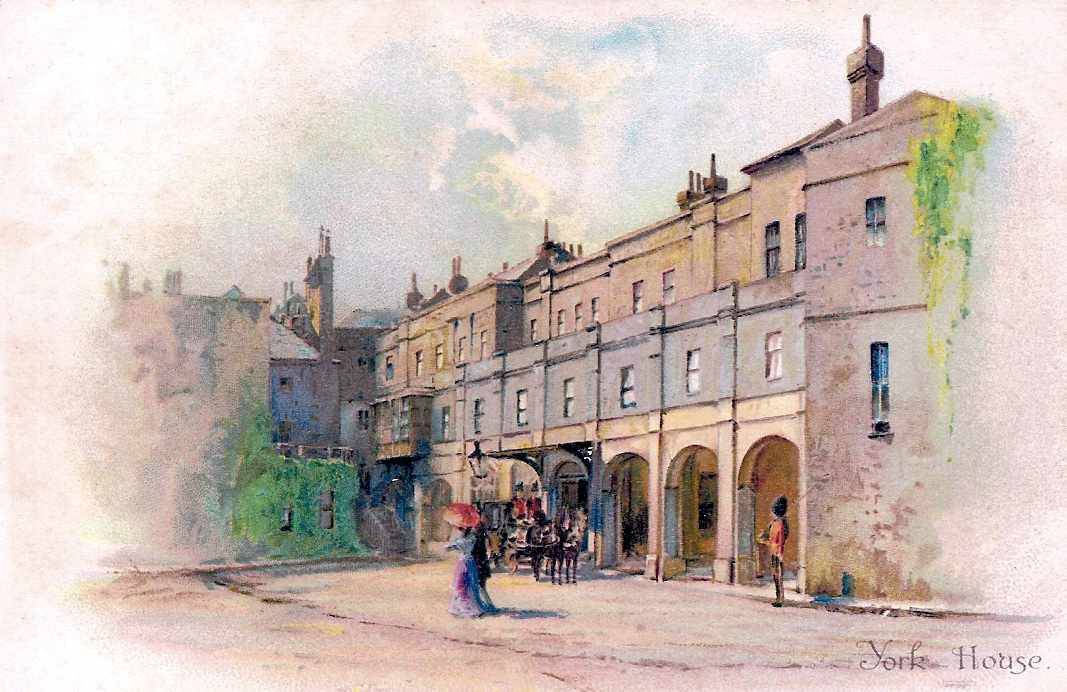
- York House, St James's Palace, early 20th century
- Interactive map of the York House area

General information
- Location: St James's Palace, England
- Completed: 1736
- Owner: The Crown Estate

York House is a historic wing of St James's Palace, London, built for Frederick, Prince of Wales, on his marriage in 1736. It is in the north-western part of the palace on the site of a former suttling-house (canteen) for the Guards; it overlooks Ambassadors' Court and Cleveland Row to the west of the old Chapel Royal. Prince Frederick occupied it for about a year, until his quarrel with his father drove him from Court.

In 1795, Princess Caroline resided here before her marriage with the Prince of Wales, afterwards George IV.

During early-to-mid 19th century, the apartments in the Palace which would later come to be known as York House were occupied by Prince Ernest Augustus, Duke of Cumberland.

Following the death of King William IV in 1837, his niece Princess Victoria of Kent succeeded as Queen of the United Kingdom, but due to the operation of the Salic Law in the Kingdom of Hanover the Duke of Cumberland succeeded as King of Hanover. Queen Victoria initially planned to give King Ernst Augustus' apartments to her mother, the Dowager Duchess of Kent, but Ernst August refused to relinquish the apartment.

Following the death of King Ernest Augustus I of Hanover in 1851, his apartments at St James's Palace were granted to his widowed sister-in-law Augusta, Dowager Duchess of Cambridge in 1852; she continued to occupy the apartments until her death in 1889. Two years later the apartment was offered to Albert Edward, Prince of Wales' oldest son Prince Albert Victor, Duke of Clarence and Avondale upon his engagement to Princess Victoria Mary of Teck. The couple began to plan the redecoration of their future home in December 1891; however the Duke of Clarence died unexpectedly in 1892. Princess Victoria Mary of Teck later married her fiancee's younger brother Prince George, Duke of York in May 1893, and the couple were granted the apartments at St James's which had been intended for the Duke of Clarence. It was during Prince George's occupancy that this section of the Palace came to be known as York House.

Upon the accession of King Edward VII in 1902, George and Mary became the Prince and Princess of Wales and were granted a larger London residence at Marlborough House. In 1910 George succeeded his father as King-Emperor of the United Kingdom and the British Dominions, and during his early reign York House was occasionally used as a guest residence for visiting Royalty. George V's cousin Crown Princess Marie of Romania and her husband Crown Prince Ferdinand were given use of York House during their stay in London for the Coronation of George V and Mary in 1911.

In 1919 York House was granted to Edward, Prince of Wales, and it remained as the Prince's London residence until he succeeded as King in January 1936. Edward came to dislike the home, preferring to use it as an office and residing instead at his Surrey residence Fort Belvedere.

Following the abdication of Edward VIII in December 1936, York House became the London residence of Prince Henry, Duke of Gloucester and his wife Alice, Duchess of Gloucester from 1936 to 1970. Following the death of Princess Marina, Duchess of Kent in 1968, it was announced in November 1969 that the Duke and Duchess of Gloucester would move from York House to Marina's former London residence at Apartment 1, Kensington Palace. Justification for the Gloucesters' relocation was provided by a Palace spokesperson, who was quoted in contemporary newspapers as stating "York House is a large and unwieldy house for present-day use. The apartment at Kensington Palace is much more compact, modernised and easier to run."

Later occupants included Prince Edward, Duke of Kent, and Princes Charles, William and Harry, who used it before moving to Clarence House.

The building includes a suite of somewhat low-pitched rooms on the ground-floor, several drawing-rooms on the first floor, a corridor in the rear, and the servants' rooms on the top storey; all facing Cleveland Row. The ceilings of the top floor are low, height having been sacrificed to that of the drawing-room floor; during the nineteenth century this was a common practice in London mansions.

The name York House has been used at various times for other houses occupied by various Dukes of York, including those now known as Cumberland House, Dover House, Lancaster House and The Albany.
