= Ernest Harrison =

20th-century English businessman

Sir Ernest Harrison OBE HonFREng
- Born: Ernest Thomas Harrison; 11 May 1926; Hackney, east London, England
- Died: 16 February 2009 (aged 82); Surrey, England
- Occupation: Chair of Racal

Sir Ernest Thomas Harrison (11 May 1926 – 16 February 2009) was an English businessman. He was best known as chairman of electronics company Racal and the first chairman of its spun-out mobile telephony division, Vodafone. Harrison was knighted in the 1981 Birthday Honours.He was also a fan and major shareholder of Arsenal Football Club. In 1997 he was elected an Honorary Fellow of the Royal Academy of Engineering.
