= Racal =

1950–2000 British electronics company

Racal Electronics plc
- Type: Public limited company
- Industry: Electronics
- Founded: 1950; 76 years ago (as Racal Ltd.)
- Founder: Raymond Brown; George Calder Cunningham
- Defunct: 2000
- Fate: Acquired by Thomson-CSF
- Successor: Thales plc
- Headquarters: Weybridge, United Kingdom
- Key people: Sir Ernest Harrison OBE (chairman)

Racal Electronics plc was a British electronics company that was founded in 1950. Listed on the London Stock Exchange and once a constituent of the FTSE 100 Index, Racal was a diversified company, offering products including voice recorders and data recorders, point of sale terminals, laboratory instruments and military electronics, including radio and radar. At its height, Racal was the third largest British electronics firm; it operated worldwide and employed over 30,000 people. £1,000 invested in Racal in 1961 would have been worth £14.5 million in 2000.

Originally established as Racal Ltd in 1950, the company name originated from the names of the partners, Raymond Brown and George Calder Cunningham. One key early employee was Ernest Harrison; originally employed as an accountant, he became chairman of Racal in 1966 and would continue in this role thought to 2000. During Harrison's tenure, numerous major deals were completed, including the negotiation of a British Army battlefield radio contract (initially Larkspur, later part of Clansman) which allegedly secured the future of Racal, the merger of Racal and British Communications Corporation (bolstering Racal's radio business), the purchase of Decca Radar in 1980 despite competition from rival firm GEC, the acquisition of British Rail Telecommunications network (to form the basis of Racal Telecom), and its investment into National Lottery company Camelot Group.

Perhaps the firm's largest success was the creation of the Vodafone mobile phone network; Racal had purchased one of the first two UK cellular telephone network licences (the other was held by British Telecom) in 1982 and the firm remained the majority owner of Vodafone up until its 80 percent stake was sold off in 1991. A series of de-mergers and spin-outs were completed by Racal throughout the 1990s; these included the de-merging of Chubb (which was reportedly made to counter a hostile takeover bid of Racal by Williams Holdings) and the sale of Racal Telecom to Global Crossing in late 1999. In 2000, Racal was purchased by Thomson-CSF (now called Thales Group), largely completing the firm's breakup. One year later, Racal Instruments Inc. became an independent company after a leveraged buyout from Thales; in 2004, it was acquired by EADS North America Defense and Test Services Inc., which was then acquired by Astronics Corporation in 2014. The Racal brand now resides with Astronics Test Systems, a wholly owned subsidiary of Astronics Corporation.

== History ==
=== Early years ===
Racal was created in 1950 as Racal Ltd, the name being derived from the names of the partners, Raymond Brown and George Calder Cunningham. Ernest Harrison joined the company as employee number 13; initially employed as an accountant, Harrison soon moved to various roles at Racal, including those of chief buyer, personnel director and contract negotiator.

The company's first factory was located in Isleworth, Middlesex. After it outgrew this site, manufacturing was relocated to Bracknell, Berkshire in 1954, enticed by a 99-year lease at four shillings and sixpence per square foot – and no rent reviews.

Following the awarding of a Royal Navy contract to Racal for the production and supply of a variant of the American Collins Model 51-J Radio Receiver, they were not granted a licence to build these sets by Collins Inc. This meant that Racal had to design and build a radio receiver from scratch. After almost bankrupting the company on account of a £40,000 overspend, the result was the 'RA17' – in production from 1955 to at least 1973 – designed in co-operation with Trevor Wadley and using his Wadley Loop circuit.

During 1958, Harrison joined the company board; three years later, in the role of deputy managing director, he helped Racal to obtain a Stock Market listing. In 1966, Harrison became chairman of the firm after co-founder Raymond Brown was lured away by the Ministry of Defence. Harrison would remain as the company's chairman through to its breakup in 2000, from which Harrison reportedly received an estimated £25 million from the sale of Racal in 2000.

=== Decca Radar ===
In 1979, Racal bought Decca Radar forming Racal-Decca. Racal-Datacom chiefly conducted business in the United States.

=== Vodafone ===
In 1980, Harrison agreed a deal with Lord Weinstock of the General Electric Company to allow Racal to access some of GEC's tactical battlefield radio technology. Briefing the head of Racal's military radio division, Gerry Whent, to drive the company into commercial mobile radio, Whent visited GE's factory in Virginia, USA in 1980. In 1981, the Racal Strategic Radio Ltd subsidiary was established.

In 1982, Racal Strategic Radio Ltd, under Whent, won one of the first two UK cellular telephone network licences; the other going to British Telecom. The network, known as Racal Vodafone, was 80% owned by Racal, with Millicom having 15% and the Hambros Technology Trust 5%. Vodafone was launched on 1 January 1985. Racal Strategic Radio was renamed Racal Telecommunications Group Limited in 1985. On 29 December 1986, Racal Electronics bought out the minority shareholders of Vodafone for £110 million.

In 1988, 20% of Racal Telecom was floated on the London Stock Exchange. This would lead to the situation where Racal Electronics was valued at less than its shareholding in Racal Telecom. Harrison demerged Racal Telecom in October 1991, forcing a positive valuation on the rest of Racal (colloquially known in the City of London as "the rump"). Vodafone would later become the largest mobile network in the world and the highest valued company on the FTSE 100. Immediately following the demerger, Williams Holdings launched a hostile takeover bid for Racal. This bid, which was valued at £740 million, was unwelcome by Racal's board, and ultimately failed.

=== Racal Vadic ===
The company marketed modems under the name Racal-Vadic, and was among the first to offer 2400 baud modems in the early 1980s. Another name it used was Racal-Milgo.

=== Chubb Security ===
In 1984, Racal bought Chubb, a security company that manufactured safes and locks. In late 1992, Chubb was demerged from Racal, it was subsequently taken over by Willams Holdings in 1997.

=== Racal Telecoms ===
Racal re-established its telecoms division following the awarding of a major government contract in 1988 to set up and operate the Government Data Network. In 1994, as part of the wider privatisation of British Rail, it was announced that Racal was to acquire British Rail Telecommunications (BRT) at a reported cost of £132.72 million; following completion of the deal, it was rebranded as Racal-BRT. The purchase comprised primarily the voice, transmission and data networks formerly owned by the state-owned railway operator British Rail, however, it did not include the operational telecoms systems that were associated with the direct operation of trains (these were allocated to the newly-created rail infrastructure company Railtrack. The deal has been critiqued as Racal allegedly did not properly understand the responsibilities that it took on through this acquisition. During the 1990s, Racal made large investments into its data network, a large portion of which being the former-BR infrastructure. By late 1999, Racal Telecoms was providing communications to more than 30 government departments.

=== Racal Instrumentation ===
Consisted of Racal Recorders (Hythe, Southampton) and Racal Instruments (Burnham, near Slough). Racal acquired Thermionic Products in 1967, creating Racal Thermionics, renamed Racal Recorders in 1978. Racal Recorders produced a wide range of magnetic tape recorders for multichannel voice recording and instrumentation recording applications.

=== Racal Redac ===
Provided Computer Aided Design (CAD) software and facilities, primarily for design of printed circuit boards; based at Tewkesbury, Gloucestershire.

=== National Lottery ===
In 1994, Camelot Group – in which Racal had a 22.5% share – won the franchise to operate the UK National Lottery. After one of the founder shareholders, GTECH, was bought out by Camelot this stake increased to 26.67%.

=== Break-up ===
In April 1995, Racal expanded its defence businesses through the acquisition of the Thorn Sensors Group from Thorn EMI for £17.5 million. Three years later, all of Racal's defence businesses were reorganised under Racal Defence Electronics Ltd into Racal Radar Defence Systems, Racal Radio and Racal Thorn.

In June 1994, Racal launched a restructuring of its data communications division following a sharp downturn in profitability. Four years later, the firm disposed of its data communications businesses, which had incurred considerable losses.

Throughout the late 1990s, there were reports that Racal was seeking a buyer for its telecoms division or to undertake a stock market flotation. Prospective bidders included Colt Telecom, Deutsche Telekom and Mannesmann. In September 1999, it was announced that the British telecoms company Energis had offered £750 million to purchase Racal Telecoms. In October 1999, Racal announced that it had decided to sell its telecoms business to another bidder, the American communications group Global Crossing, in exchange for £1 billion.

Even prior to the sale of Racal Telecom, the company had been open about its desires to sell off its defence electronics and industrial electronics divisions, which comprised much of the remaining company by that point; it was speculated that defence firms such as British Aerospace and Raytheon were likely to show interest in such a sale. In January 2000, the French conglomerate Thomson-CSF announced its bid to purchase the remainder of Racal: following the acceptance of Thales' bid, the firm became Thomson-CSF Racal plc, and was later integrated into Thales plc following the renaming of the parent company Thomson-CSF to Thales Group.

In December 2008, Racal Acoustics Ltd was acquired by Esterline Technologies, and has become part of their Communications Systems business.
