= Witley Park =

Estate and former mansion in Surrey, England

Coordinates: 51°08′48″N 0°40′51″W

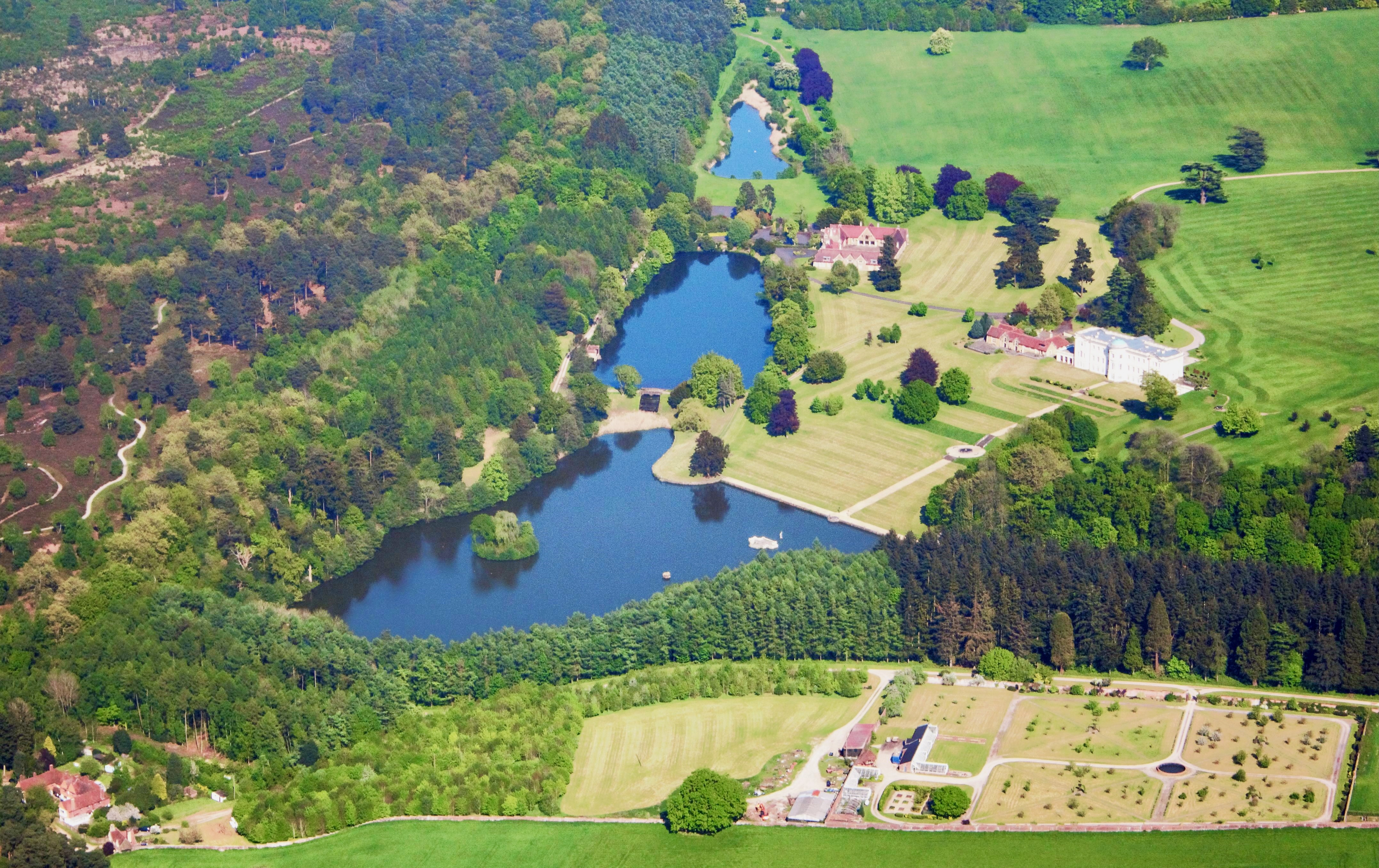
Witley Park from the west: The mansion built in the mid-2000s is centre right and the body of water nearest the camera is Thursley Lake.

Witley Park, formerly known as Lea Park, is an estate dating from the late 19th century between Godalming and Haslemere in Surrey, England. Its landscaped grounds include three artificial lakes, one of which conceals an underwater conservatory and smoking room. The mansion house, rebuilt for the swindler Whitaker Wright, was gutted by fire in October 1952 and the ruins were demolished in January 1954. In the early 21st century, a new house was built on the site.

At its height, under Wright's ownership at the start of the 20th century, the estate covered 9,000 acres (36 km^{2}; 14 sq mi). Following his death in 1904, it was sold and became increasingly fragmented. Much of Hindhead Common, Witley Common and Thursley Common was bought by local residents and presented to the National Trust in December 1905.

== History ==
In the medieval and early modern periods, Witley Park was part of the manor of Witley. At the time of Domesday Book, it was held by Gislebert (Gilbert), son of Richere de L'Aigle. It became the property of the Crown during the reign of Edward I (1272–1307). It was sold to Philip Carteret Webb in 1763 and remained in his family until the late 19th century.

Lea Park, as it was known at the time, was purchased in 1878 by William Henry Stone, the former MP for Portsmouth, for £47,000. Stone commissioned the architect, Richard William Drew, to design a 25-bedroom Queen Anne-style mansion house, which was completed in 1881. The estate was again offered for sale in 1892 and was purchased for £26,000 by Colonel Davison of Stow-on-the-Wold the following year. (Note: When offered for sale in 1892, Lea Park covered an area of 700 acres (280 ha), but only 421 acres (170 ha) were purchased by Colonel Davison.)

In 1896, the swindler Whitaker Wright purchased Lea Park and the adjacent South Park Farm. The title to the estate included the titular Lordship of the Manor and control of Hindhead Common and the Devil's Punch Bowl, amounting to a total of around 9,000 acres (36 km^{2}; 14 sq mi). Wright commissioned the architect, H. Paxton-Watson, to remodel the existing mansion, adding two wings to increase the number of bedrooms to 32. He constructed a wall to enclose the 440 acres (180 ha) closest to the house and landscaped the grounds by building three artificial lakes. Wright committed suicide immediately after his conviction for fraud on 26 January 1904 and his properties were auctioned off. Much of Hindhead Common, Witley Common and Thursley Common was purchased by a committee of local residents and passed to the National Trust on 30 December 1905.

William Pirrie, 1st Viscount Pirrie bought Lea Park in 1909. He changed the name to "Witley Park" and added several hundred acres of land to the estate, purchased from Edward Stanley, 17th Earl of Derby. Pirrie died without an heir in July 1924 and the estate was then owned by Sir John Leigh, 1st Baronet, MP for Clapham, from August 1924 to 1951.

The estate was bought in early 1952 by Ronald Huggett, who immediately sold around half of the land, retaining around 1,300 acres (530 ha). That October, the mansion was severely damaged by fire and was subsequently demolished in January 1954. In 1955, Huggett sold the remaining part of the estate to Gerald Bentall. Bentall farmed much of the land and commissioned Patrick Gwynne to build the five-bedroom, Modern movement Witley Park House in the early 1960s.

In 1982, the 1,300-acre estate was purchased by Sir Raymond and Lady Brown. Raymond Brown died in 1991 and his widow, Carol, sold the estate in the early 2000s to Gary Steele, an American businessman working in cyber security. Steele commissioned the construction of a new, neo-Georgian mansion designed by Robert Adam on the site of Wright's residence. (Note: Planning permission for the new mansion was permitted under the so-called Gummer's Law exemption, which allowed development of an isolated new house on greenfield land, providing that it enhanced its surroundings and that its design was "truly outstanding".) In 2018, Witley Park was purchased by Oleg and Galina Smirnoff for £30 million. Later in the same year, parts of the estate were sold to a Guernsey-based company for around £7M. Planning permission to extend the mansion, to build a helipad and to reinstate a summerhouse that had been removed in the 1950s, was granted in March 2019.

== Lea Park mansion ==
The core of Whitaker Wright's Lea Park mansion was designed by the architect, Richard William Drew, for William Henry Stone. Completed in 1881, the half-timbered house was built in the Queen Anne style, and had 25 bedrooms. Wright commissioned H. Paxton-Watson to add two new wings, built of Bargate stone, to the existing structure. When completed, the house had seven reception rooms and 32 bedrooms. The decoration was lavish and upstairs rooms had moulded ceilings, oriental carpets, Chinese furniture and Japanese silk pictures. The largest ground floor room was the ballroom, which had a floor area of 2,600 sq ft (240 m^{2}), an oak and walnut dance floor, crystal chandeliers and a theatre stage at one end.

At the end of the west wing was a glass-domed conservatory with walls built of Bath stone and at the opposite site of the building, at the end of the east wing was a copper-roofed observatory. The main dining room was 50 ft-long (15 m) and the kitchens were able to cater for up to 400 people. Other ground-floor rooms included a billiards room, a small private hospital and a velodrome. The cellars included underground strongrooms for storing valuable furniture and works of art.

The house was gutted by fire in October 1952 and the ruins were demolished in January 1954.

== Landscaped grounds ==
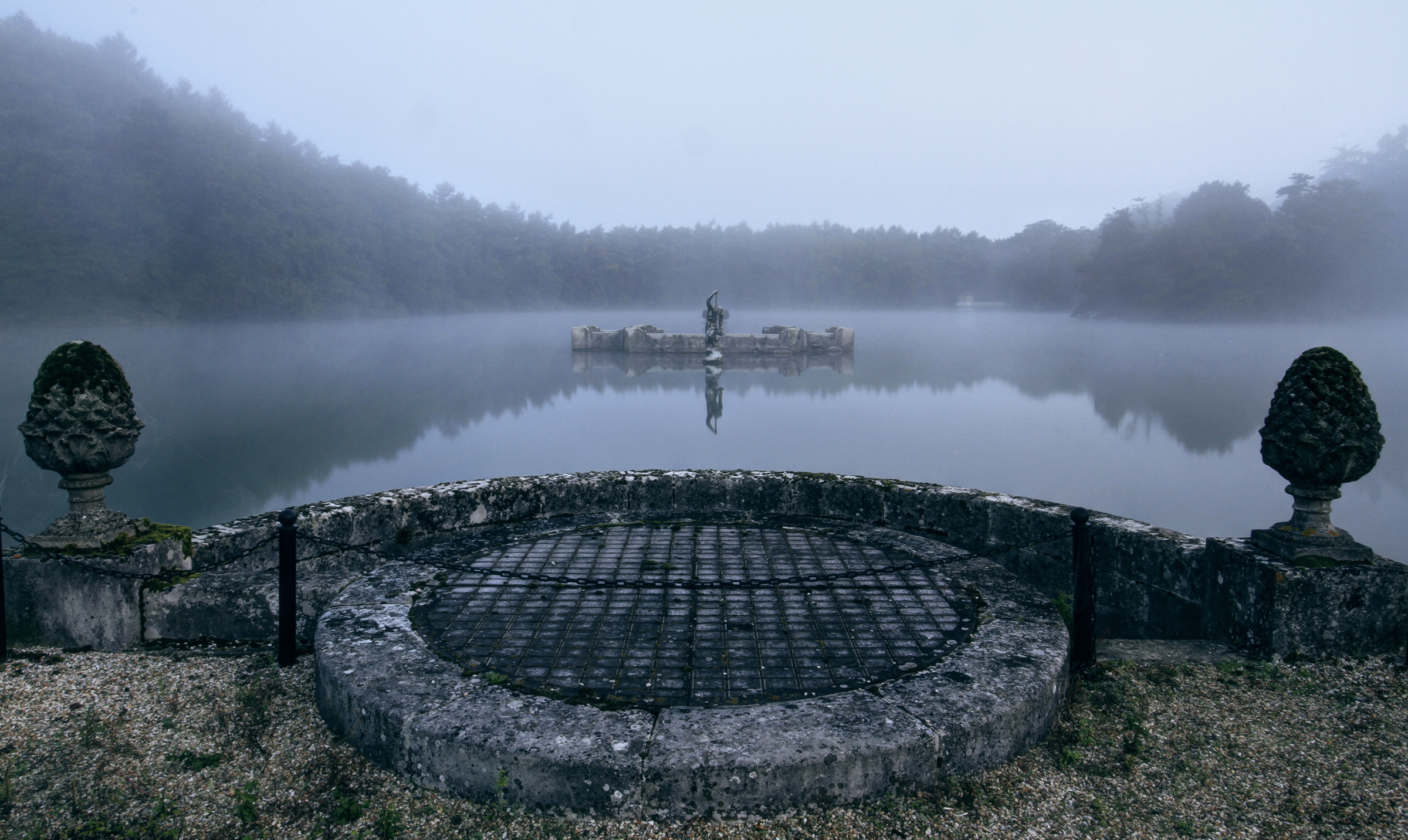
Statue of Neptune in Thursley Lake

When Whitaker Wright bought Lea Park, there were already two ornamental ponds, formed by damming a small tributary of the River Wey. He re-landscaped the grounds, to create three much larger lakes, adorned with statues and fountains, one of which, in the shape of a dolphin's head, is carved from Italian marble. A set of Italian marble statues of bathing ladies, which Wright had acquired but not installed at Lea Park, were sold to Ratan Tata in 1906 and erected in the grounds of York House, Twickenham.

Beneath the largest lake, now known as Thursley Lake, is an underwater conservatory and smoking room, connected to the shore by glazed tunnel and accessed via a stone staircase. Above the conservatory is a statue of Neptune, which appears to float on the surface of the water. The glass structures were constructed before the lake was filled and were reinforced with iron rings, of an identical design to those used on the Metropolitan line of the London Underground. The conservatory may have been in part designed by the civil engineer, Herbert Bartlett, who was responsible for constructing the Bakerloo line. Connected to the conservatory is a billiards room, from which steps lead up to an artificial island.

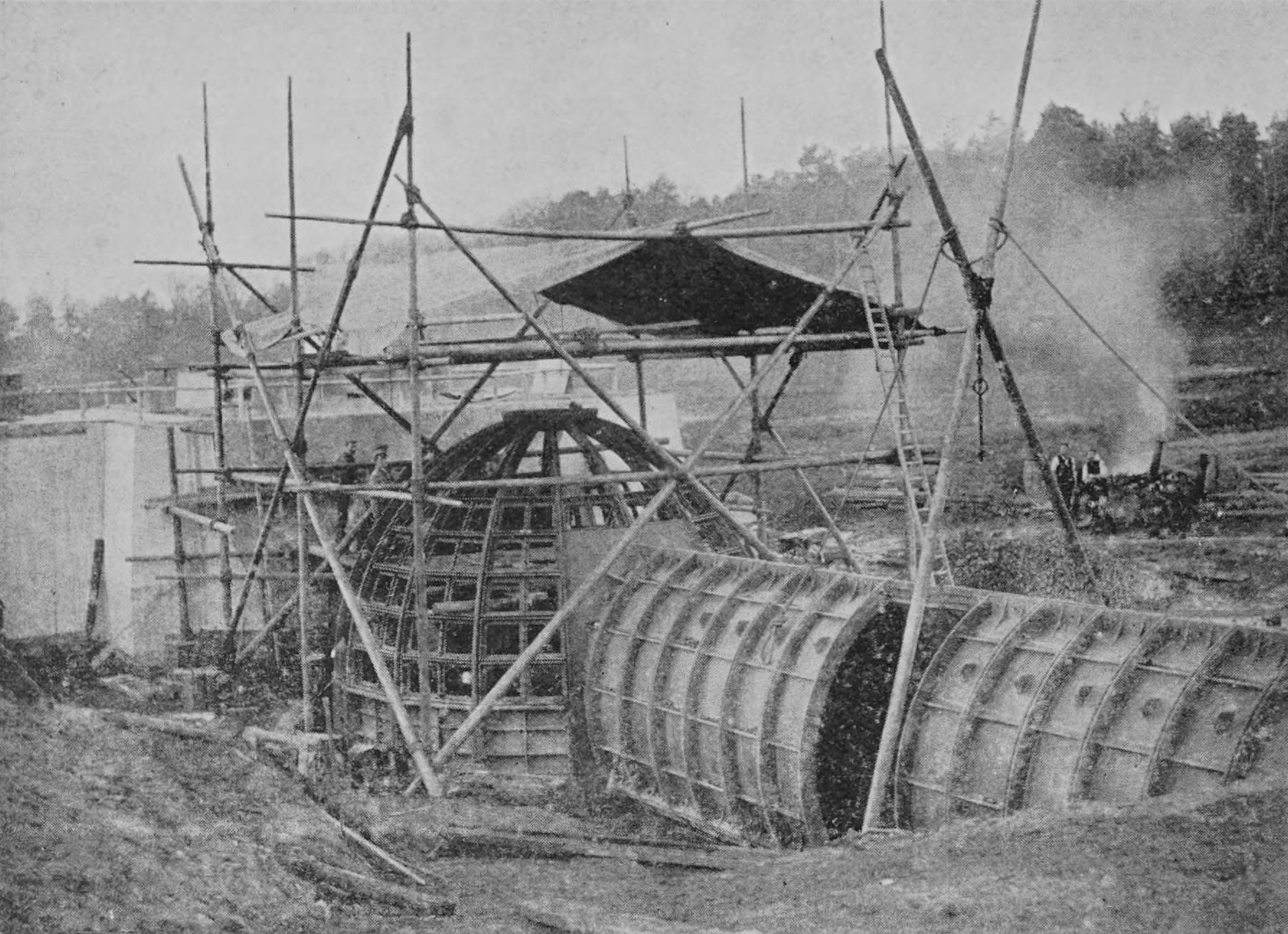
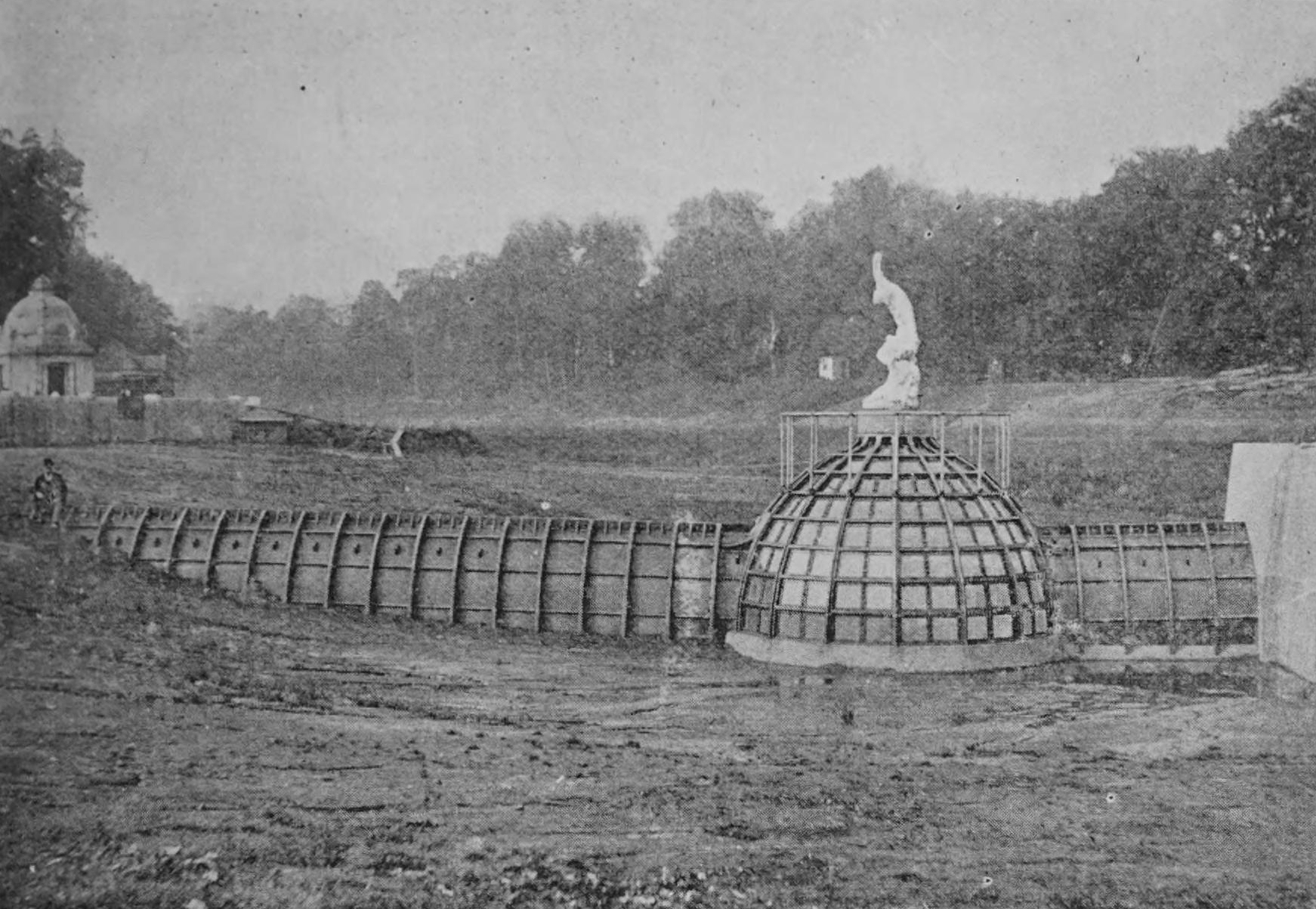
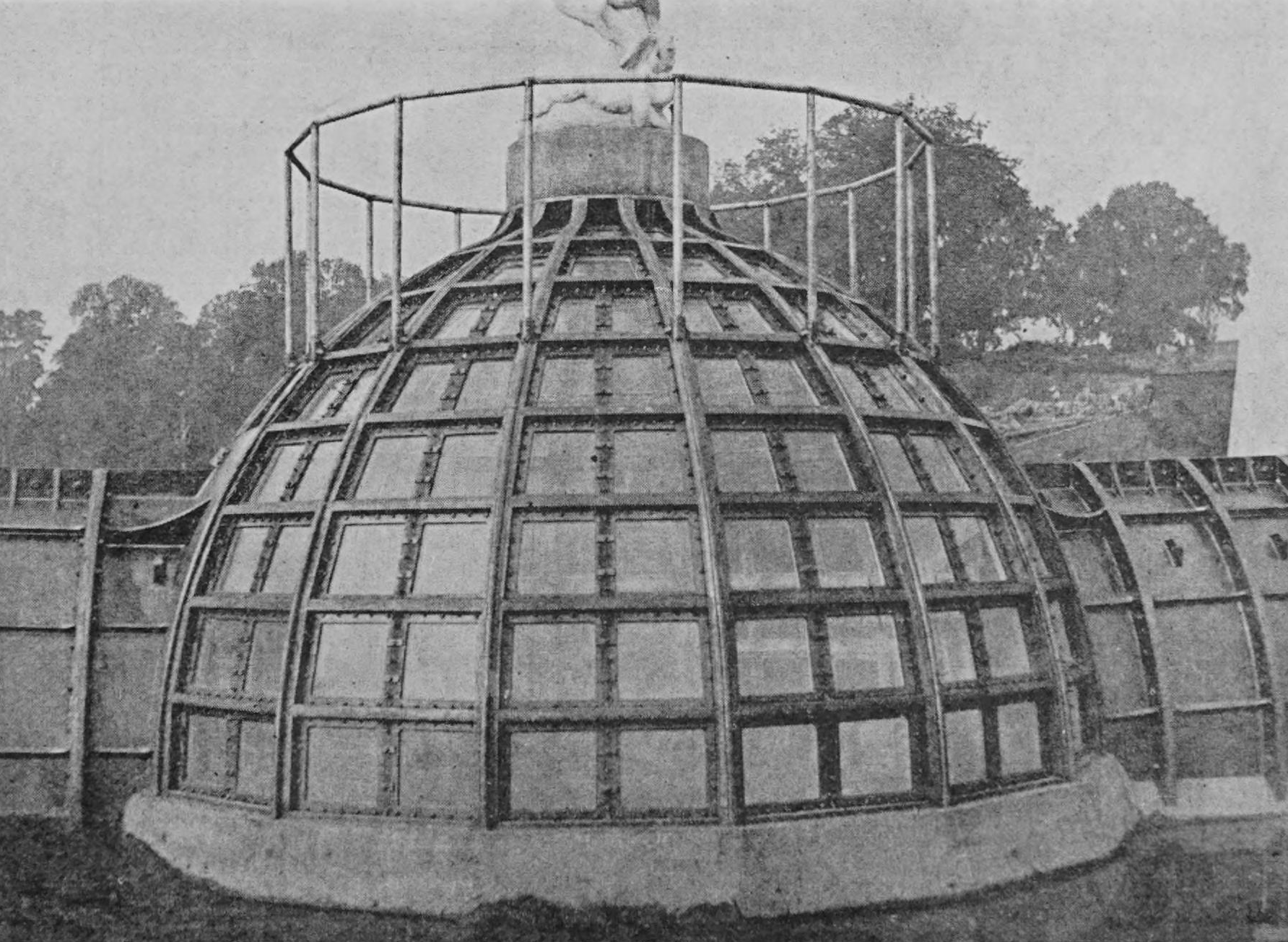
Photographs of the construction of the underwater conservatory and smoking room in Thursley Lake, published in The Architects' & Builders' Journal in 1911

The octagonal Turbine House or pavilion is built of sandstone with a bronze dome roof. It is at the end of a wooden pier that projects into Thursley Lake and may have been designed by Paxton Watson. The Underwater Boat House, built primarily of shuttered concrete, includes three linked underground chambers, the easternmost of which has double wooden doors opening directly onto the same lake. On the opposite bank are a Temple in the Beaux Arts style and a boathouse. This second boathouse was designed by Edwin Lutyens, who was also responsible for the bathing pavilion on Stable Lake. Separating Stable and Thursley Lakes, is a weir with a bridge above, thought to have been designed by Paxton-Watson.

== Other buildings ==
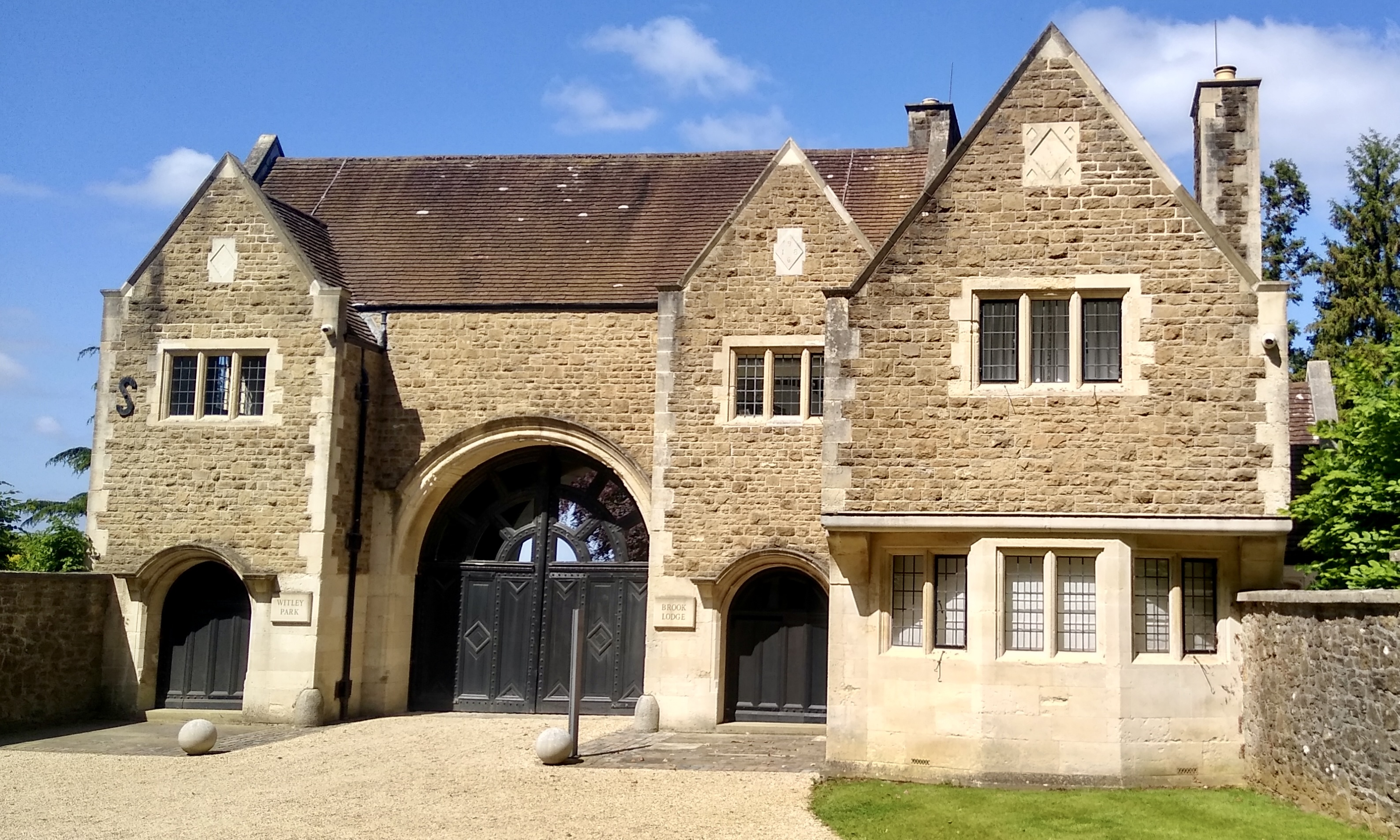
Brook Lodge

The Tudor-style stable block, also designed by Paxton-Watson for Wright, still stands to the northeast of the site of the mansion. Built in sandstone, it was capable of housing 50 horses and was centrally heated.

Four lodges, designed by Paxton-Watson, survive at the former entrances to the estate. They are: Brook Lodge, Milford Lodge, Thursley Lodge and Ormiston Lodge.

Witley Park House was designed in the Modern movement style by Patrick Gwynne and was completed in 1962. It was commissioned by Gerald Bentall, who chose a location on an area of higher ground with views towards the South Downs in preference to the site of Wright's mansion. The plan of the house is a V-shaped arrangement of three interlinked hexagons, with an angle of 120° between the two wings. The focal point of the house is the entrance hall, with a cantilevered staircase in white terrazzo. Together, the living and dining rooms form the hexagonal area at the west end of the house. The Browns, who purchased the house after Bentall's death in 1971, commissioned Gwynne to design and oversee modifications to the interior.

== Bibliography ==
- Bingham, Neil (2023). Patrick Gwynne. Liverpool: Liverpool University Press. ISBN 978-1-80-207754-4.
- Cherry, Bridget; Pevsner, Nikolaus (1983). London 2: South. The Buildings of England. Harmondsworth: Penguin. ISBN 978-0-14-071047-2.
- Jones, Barbara (1974) [1953]. Follies & Grottoes (2nd ed.). London: Constable. ISBN 0-09-459350-7.
- O'Brien, Charles; Nairn, Ian; Cherry, Bridget (2022) [1962]. Pevsner, Nikolaus (ed.). Surrey. The Buildings of England. London: Yale University Press. ISBN 978-0-30-023478-7.
- Macrory, Henry (2018). Ultimate Folly: The Rises and Falls of Whitaker Wright, the World's Most Shameless Swindler. London: Biteback Publishing Ltd. ISBN 978-1-78-590378-6.
