= Whitaker Wright =

English fraudster and businessman (1846–1904)

James Whitaker Wright
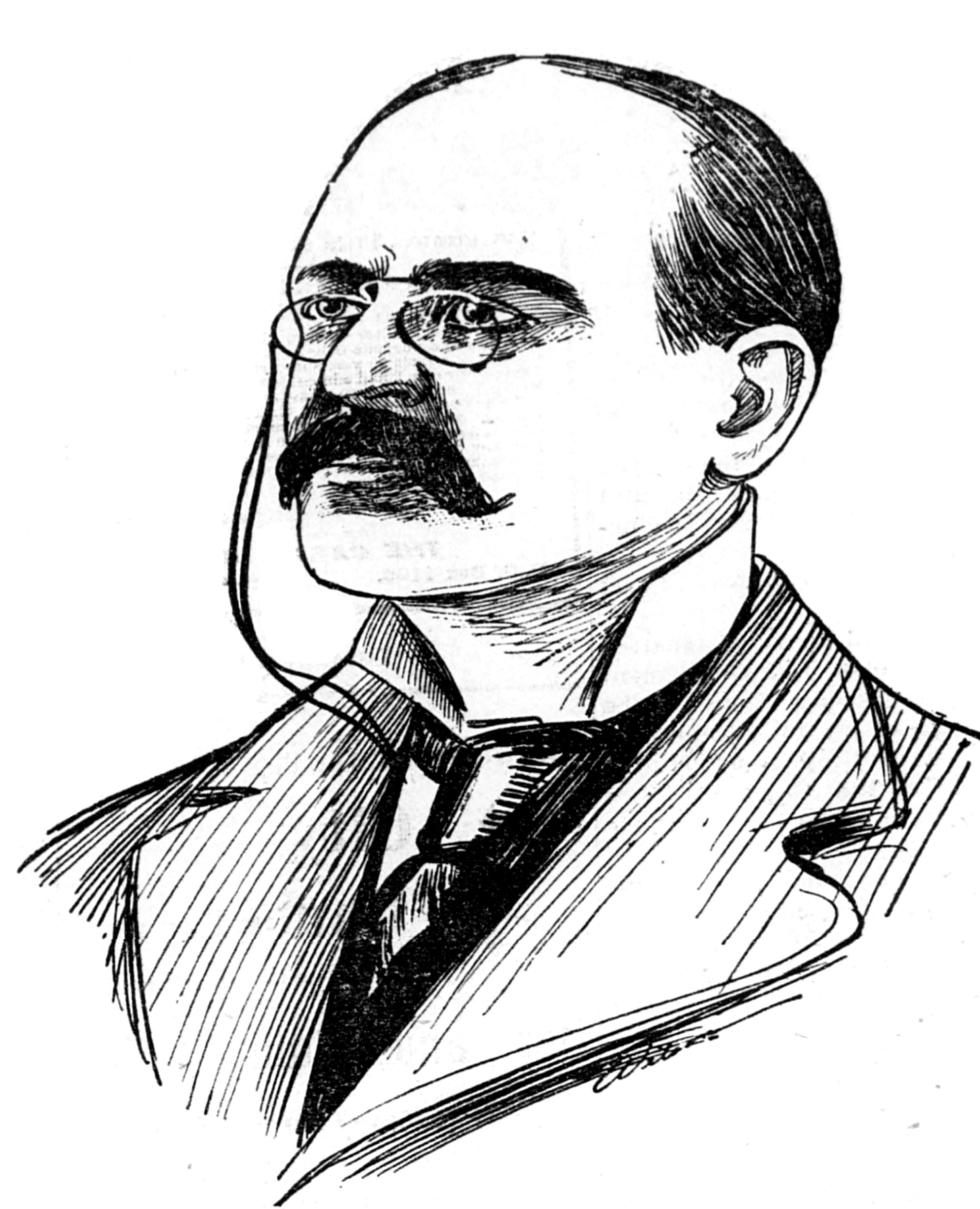
- Drawing of Whitaker Wright, 1904
- Born: 9 February 1846; Stafford, England
- Died: 26 January 1904 (aged 57); Royal Courts of Justice, Westminster, England
- Cause of death: Suicide
- Spouse: Anna Edith Weightman
- Parent(s): James Wright, Matilda Whitaker
- Status: convicted
- Convictions: 26 January 1904
- Criminal charge: Fraud
- Penalty: seven years imprisonment

James Whitaker Wright (9 February 1846 – 26 January 1904) was a company promoter and swindler, who committed suicide at the Royal Courts of Justice in London immediately following his conviction for fraud.

== Early life ==
The eldest of five children, he was the son of James Wright, a Methodist Minister, and Matilda Whitaker, a tailor's daughter. He was born in Stafford, and spent his early years in various parts of England with his father. At an early age he was sent to Shireland Hall School in the Staffordshire town of Smethwick, a boarding establishment funded by charitable donations which catered for the sons of clergymen of all denominations. He was instructed in Latin and Greek and was taught how to use a printing press. In 1861, according to the census of that year, he was a printer in Ripon. Between 1866 and 1868, he was a Methodist preacher like his father, but retired due to ill health. He was also the elder brother of John Joseph Wright, who invented the reversible trolley pole, which transmitted electricity from an overhead wire to the motors of a tram or trolleybus. The brothers started a business as printers and stationers in Halifax, England in 1868 but it failed the following year.

== Emigration, marriage and fortune ==
On the death of his father in 1870, the family emigrated to Toronto, Ontario, Canada. Wright then travelled to Philadelphia, US where he met and married Anna Edith Weightman in 1878. Wright made a fortune by promoting silver-mining companies in Leadville, Colorado, and Lake Valley, New Mexico, although none of the companies made money for the shareholders.

Wright returned to England, and promoted a multitude of Australian and Canadian mining companies on the London market.

== Sharp practices ==
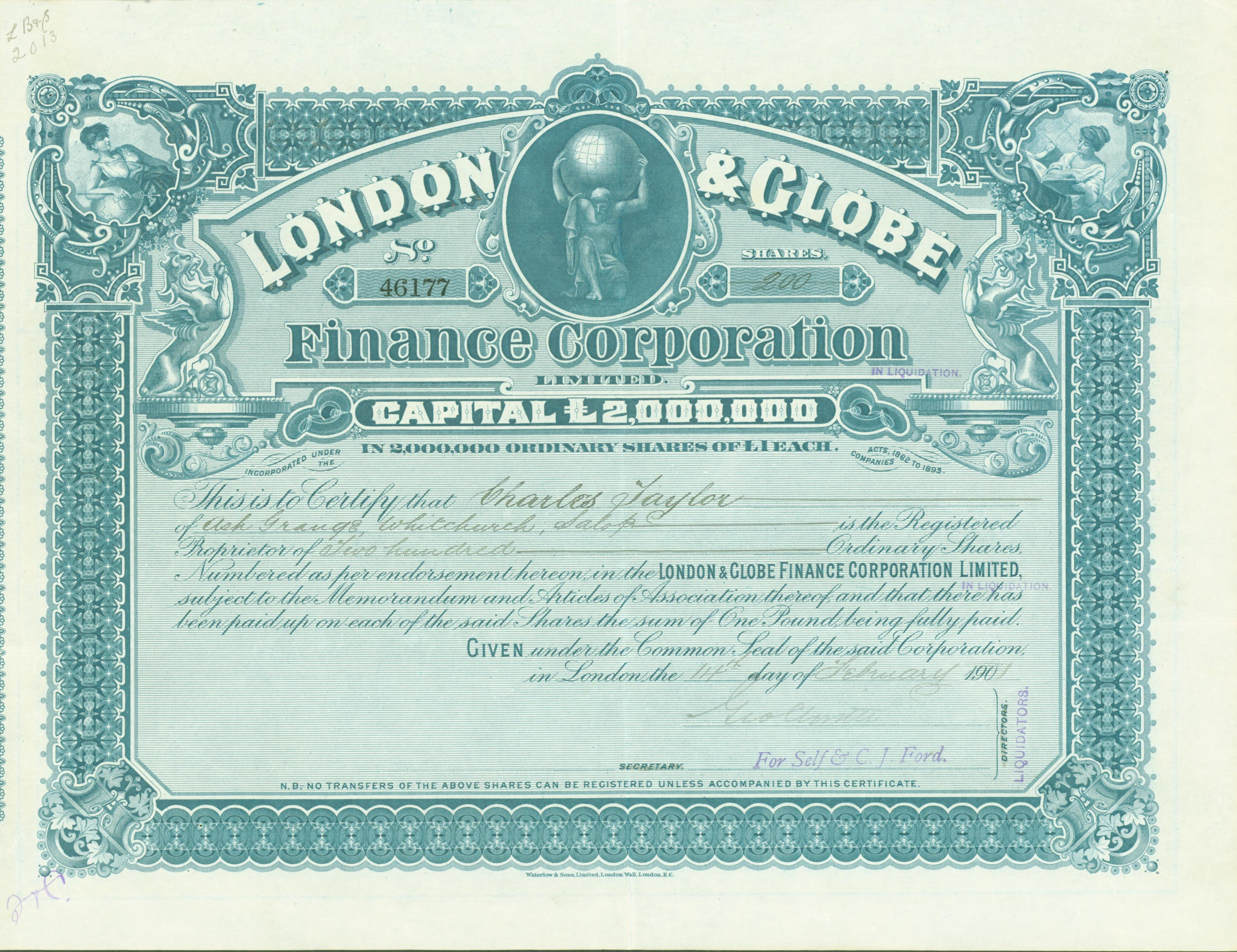
Share of the London & Globe Finance Corp. Ltd., issued 14 February 1901

Wright's career as a swindler peaked in the 1890s, when he formed the London and Globe Company which floated a variety of stock and bond issues dealing with mining. Wright called some of these stocks "consols", the term used by the British government for state bond issues that were solid and reliable. He loaded the directorships of his companies with peers of the realm; for instance, the Chairman of the London and Globe Company was the Marquess of Dufferin and Ava, a former Viceroy of India. This served the purpose both of impressing the public and attracting wealthy investors. Wright also sought to make a place for himself in late Victorian English Society, buying the Lea Park estate in Surrey, which he renamed Witley Park, and building a large mansion. Wright also owned the yacht Sybarita which beat the yacht Meteor (which belonged to Kaiser Wilhelm II of Germany) before the Royal Yacht Squadron.

Wright became a friend and financial adviser to Sir James Reid, the personal physician to Queen Victoria. In fact Reid became the trustee for Mrs. Wright in the financier's will; later this would lead to financial difficulties for the physician for neglecting her interests in the events connected to Wright's fall. Reid eventually had to pay Mrs. Wright £5,000.

Everything was apparently working well in Wright's empire, when in 1900 he sought to float a bond issue for the building of the Baker Street and Waterloo Railway (now the London Underground's Bakerloo line). The line had been difficult and costly to construct. Why Wright sought to get involved in the company is contentious; he was a mining engineer, not a construction or railroad engineer. It is likely that Wright believed he would be able to cap his career in city finance if he were knighted for his public spirited activity. In any case the bond issue was a disaster – Wright found it strained his resources, and few people were willing to subscribe. It started the collapse of the entire Wright group.

At this point Wright made his criminal error. To maintain an image of solvency and success, Wright kept pushing thousands of pounds from one of his companies to another in a series of "loans". This led to some misrepresentations on balance sheets. But when he announced that, despite the apparent prosperity of his group, there would be no dividends, people became suspicious. In December 1900, the companies collapsed. Wright fled, but was brought back to stand trial. The shock waves led to a panic in London's exchange. There were other losses. The humiliated Marquess of Dufferin and Ava died in 1902 in the midst of the investigation.

== Trial and death ==
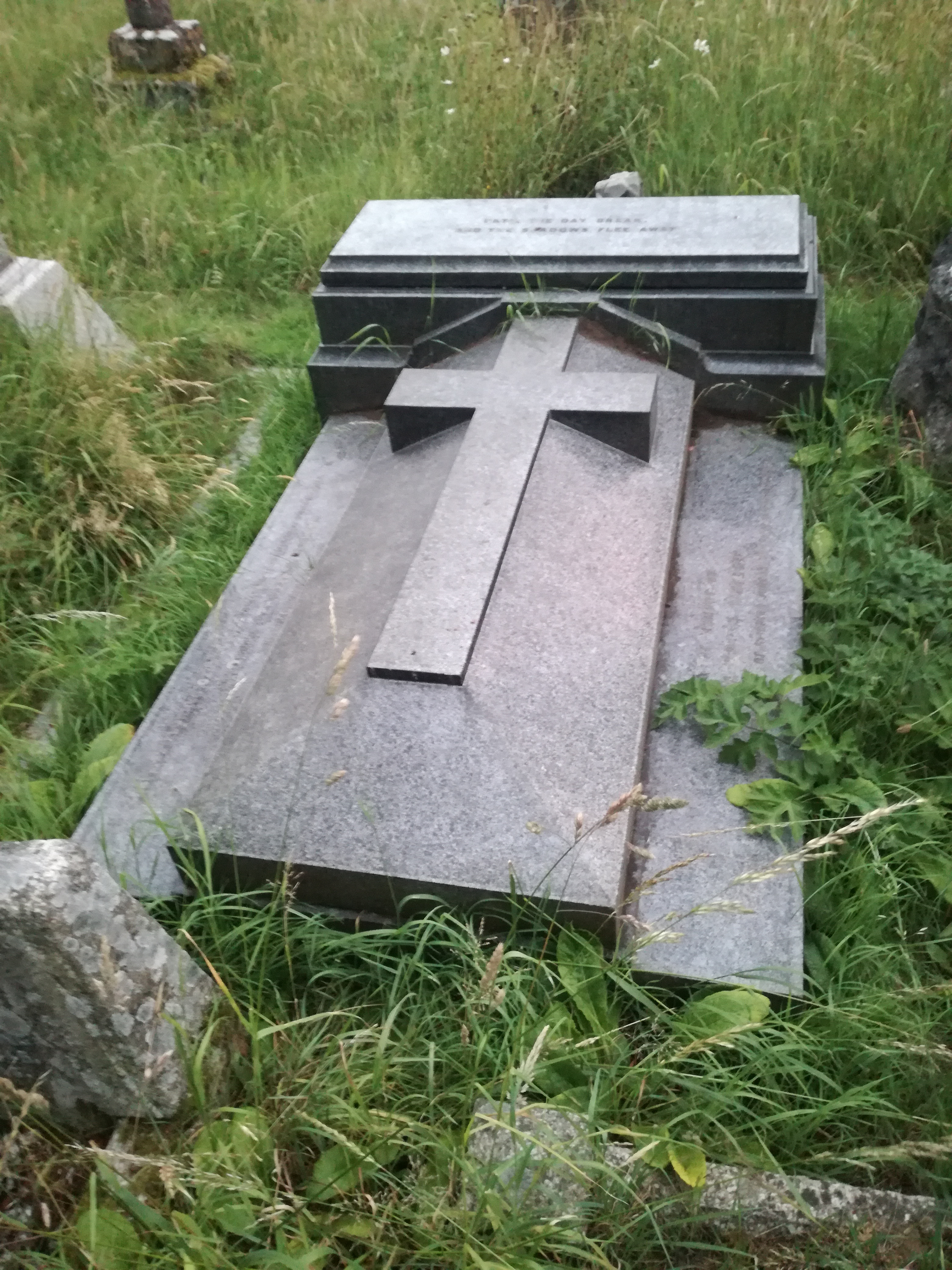
Grave of Whitaker Wright at All Saints' Church, Witley

The trial took place in January 1904, before Mr. Justice Bigham; the prosecution was led by one of the best barristers of the day, Rufus Isaacs. Bigham was one of the most astute corporate law experts in England, and Isaacs was an expert in stock market procedure, having previously worked as a broker. The government, when studying the confusion of Wright's paper trail, could not see a successful government prosecution; instead the prosecution was brought by the stockholders. With a prosecutor exposing the various financial tricks that Wright pulled for the jury, and a jurist patiently explaining points about finance, Wright's attempts at obfuscation were defeated.

On 26 January 1904, Wright was convicted of fraud at the Royal Courts of Justice and given a seven-year prison sentence. He committed suicide by swallowing cyanide in a court anteroom immediately afterward. The inquest also revealed that he had been carrying a revolver in his pocket, presumably as a backup; he was never searched, as the security was weaker at the Royal Courts, which were Civil Courts. The trial was held there as it was deemed likelier that the special jury required would be less prejudiced against the accused than a normal jury at the Old Bailey criminal court, which was in the city. Despite his financial misconduct, there was a great outburst of grief at his funeral at Witley, where he is buried.

== Witley Park ==
In 1890 Wright purchased an estate named Lea Park between Godalming and Haslemere, Surrey, and the adjacent South Park Farm from the Earl of Derby. Ownership of these properties granted Wright Lordship of the Manor and control of Hindhead Common and the Devil's Punch Bowl. Whitaker Wright began to develop his new properties as a single estate, Witley Park, creating three lakes, the largest of which covered fifty acres of farmland. Wright's wide-ranging landscaping works raised local concerns of their impact on the local economy and the natural landscape. In Thursley Lake he had an underwater smoking room built beneath a roof aquarium. Following his death, Witley Park was purchased by William, Lord Pirrie who extended the estate further. The remainder of the estate was divided into lots for sale, and funds raised locally enabled the purchase of Hindhead Common, which was transferred to the National Trust.

== In popular culture ==
- Whitaker Wright was popularised along with his fictional great-grandson in a 2006 episode of Hustle titled "Ties That Bind Us".
- H. G. Wells was fascinated by the fall of Wright, and it influenced the writer's novels Tono-Bungay and The World of William Clissold.

== References and sources ==
Sources

- Macrory, Henry (2018). Ultimate Folly - the Rises and Falls of Whitaker Wright the World's Most Shameless Swindler. Biteback. ISBN 978-1-78590-378-6.
- Hamilton, Douglas (2018). The Making of Whitaker Wright. Douglas Hamilton. ISBN 978-1983139536.
- Yates, Dornford (1952). As Berry and I Were Saying. Ward Lock & Co.

Further reading

- Lustgarten, Edgar (1977). "City Cases". The Illustrated Story of Crime. Barnes & Noble. pp. 46–50. ISBN 0-06-465090-1.
- Plazak, Dan (2010). "Whitaker Wright's House of Cards". A Hole in the Ground with a Liar at the Top: Fraud and Deceit in the Golden Age of American Mining. The University of Utah Press. ISBN 978-0-87480-840-7.
- Reid, Michaela (1987). Ask Sir James: Sir James Reid, Personal Physician to Queen Victoria and Physician-in-Ordinary to Three Monarchs. Viking–Penguin Books. pp. 228–230. ISBN 978-0140130249.
- Walker Smith, Derek (1934). "The Fall of Whitaker Wright". Lord Reading and his Cases, the Study of a Great Career. The Macmillan Co. pp. 133–154. ISBN 9781406731972.
