= York House, Twickenham =

Municipal building in London, England

York House
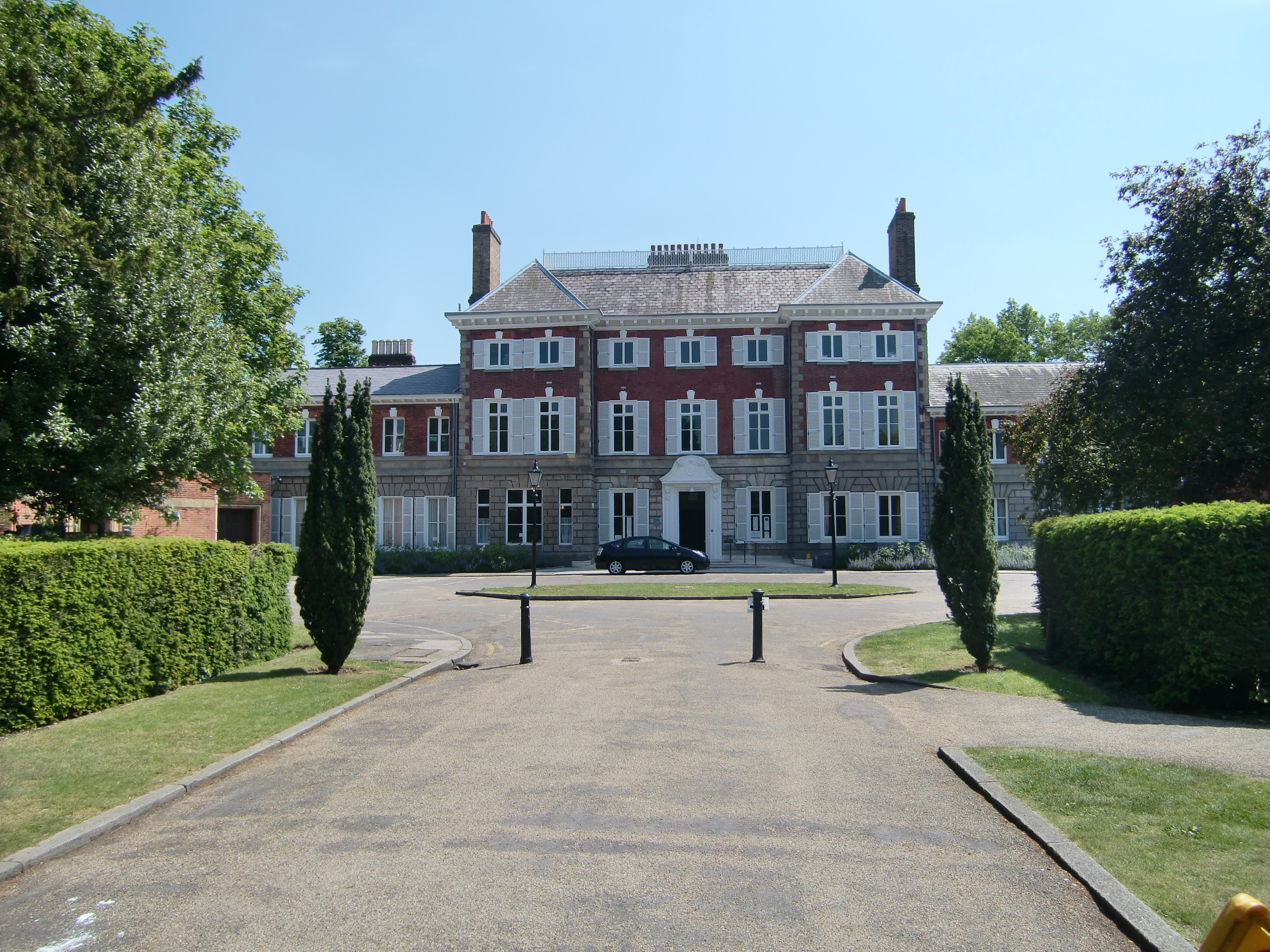
- York House in May 2009

- Shown in Richmond upon Thames
- 51°26′52″N 0°19′28″W
- Location: Richmond, London

History
- Built: c.1630

Site notes
- Website: www.richmond.gov.uk

Listed Building – Grade II*
- Designated: 2 September 1952
- Reference no.: 1263365

York House is a historic stately home in Twickenham, England, and currently serves as the town hall of the London Borough of Richmond upon Thames. It is in Richmond Road, near the centre of Twickenham, close to St Mary's Church. It is a Grade II* listed building which is in a large park, which is also listed.

== History ==
=== Early history ===
Unlike several other UK buildings also called York House, the Twickenham building did not take its name from being a residence of a Duke of York. The central portion of York House dates to the 1630s and derives its name from the Yorke family, owners of farming land in the area. It was built for Andrew Pitcarne, a courtier of King Charles I. When Pitcarne died in 1640, the house was sold to Edward Montagu, 2nd Earl of Manchester, in 1656, and then re-sold in 1661 for £3,500 to Henry Hyde, the son of Edward Hyde, 1st Earl of Clarendon, the Lord Chancellor.

It then passed through several owners, including (in the late 18th century) Count Ludwig von Starhemberg (1762–1833), the Austrian ambassador to London. He accumulated debt and in 1817 the house was sold to Mrs Anne Seymour Damer (1748–1828), a sculptor and close friend of Horace Walpole, after whom the house passed to linguist Sir Alexander Johnston (1775–1849), a former Chief Justice of Ceylon, founder of the Royal Asiatic Society and a Privy Councillor. Members of the Johnston family continued to live in the house until 1863, intermixed with tenants such as the Dowager Duchess of Roxburghe (widow of the 5th Duke) until 1837, and William Lowther, 1st Earl of Lonsdale (1757–1844).

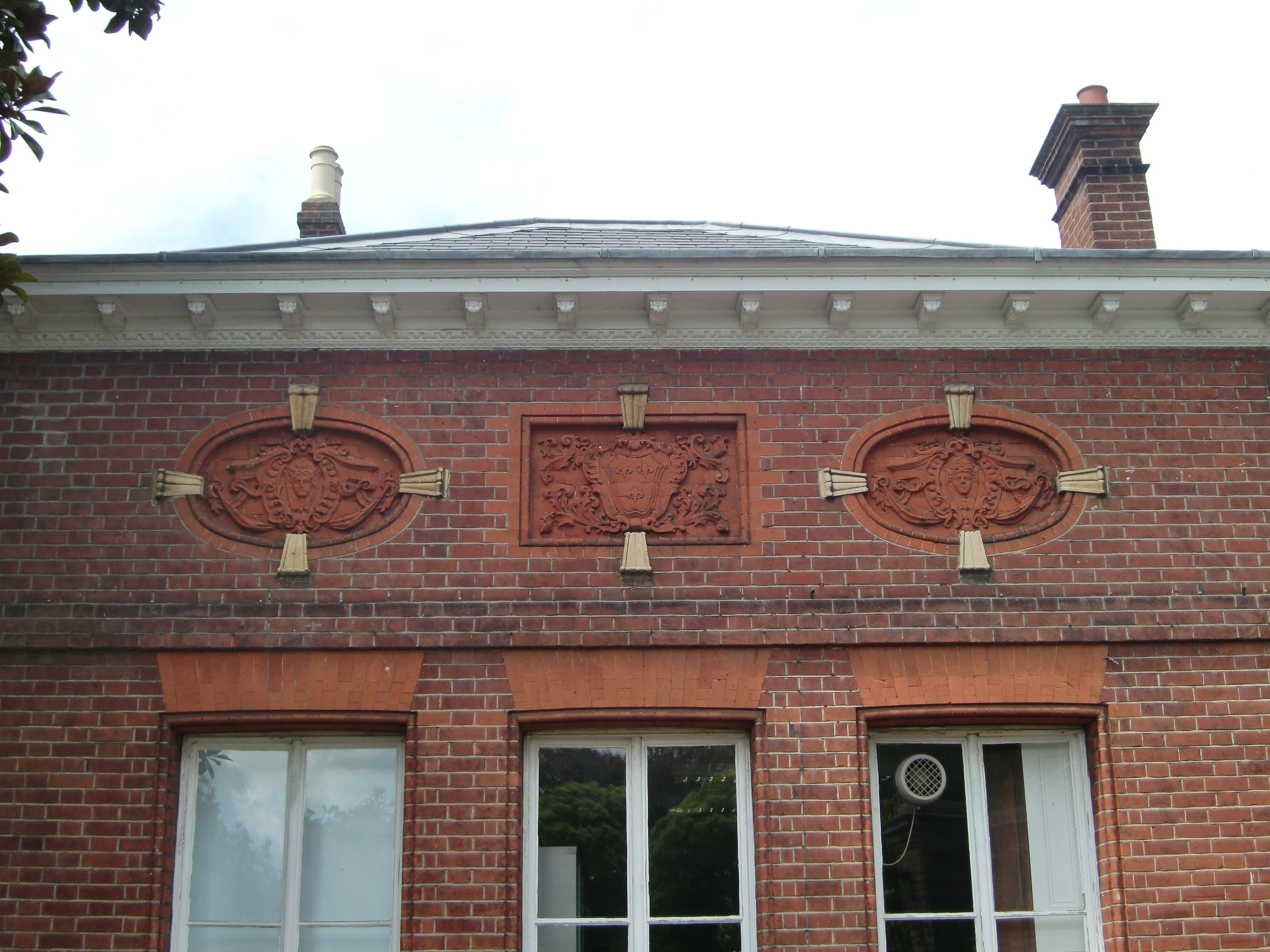
Fleur de lis detail on loggia marks an extension made by the Orleanist pretender.

In 1864 the property was acquired by two directors of Coutts Bank on behalf of the Orleans Pretender, Philippe, comte de Paris. Three of his four children were born in York House. He and his family returned to France following the defeat and fall of Napoleon III as a result of the Franco-Prussian War of 1869–71.

The house then remained empty until 1876 when it was bought by Sir Mountstuart Elphinstone Grant Duff (1829–1906), a Scottish MP, junior minister in Gladstone's first government, and from 1881 to 1887 Governor of Madras. A notable guest, Laurence Oliphant, died at York House on 23 December 1888.

The link with the Orleanists was renewed for a decade from 1896 to 1906 when the then Orleanist pretender Philippe, duc d'Orléans, reacquired the house he'd been born in.

=== Sir Ratan Tata ===
The last private owner was Sir Ratan Tata (1871–1918), a Parsi and a major industrialist in India. After acquiring the house in 1906 he had the riverside section of the gardens largely laid to lawn as an Italian style garden; which was a setting for garden parties and to show off a set of statues that he'd bought. A generous donor to charities, he entertained widely until 1914, when he returned to India. In 1917, on his way back to England, his ship was sunk in the Mediterranean. Now a sick man, he survived, only to die in 1918.

=== Twickenham Council ===
York House was acquired in 1924 by Twickenham Urban District Council and after major alterations became the council's offices. The new council chamber was formally opened by the then Duke of York (later King George VI) in 1926, the same year that the urban district became a municipal borough.

=== London Borough of Richmond upon Thames ===
Since 1965 York House has been the municipal offices of the London Borough of Richmond upon Thames. In 1990 the council moved most of its offices to a new purpose-built Civic Centre at 44 York Street, immediately west of York House. The Civic Centre was partly built behind the retained Victorian façade of a parade of shops at the corner of York Street and Church Street. Council meetings continue to be held in York House.

York House provided the setting for the sanatorium scenes in the film Alfie starring Michael Caine filmed in 1966.

It was also the location for the video for The Cure's "The Hanging Garden" single.

== Gardens ==
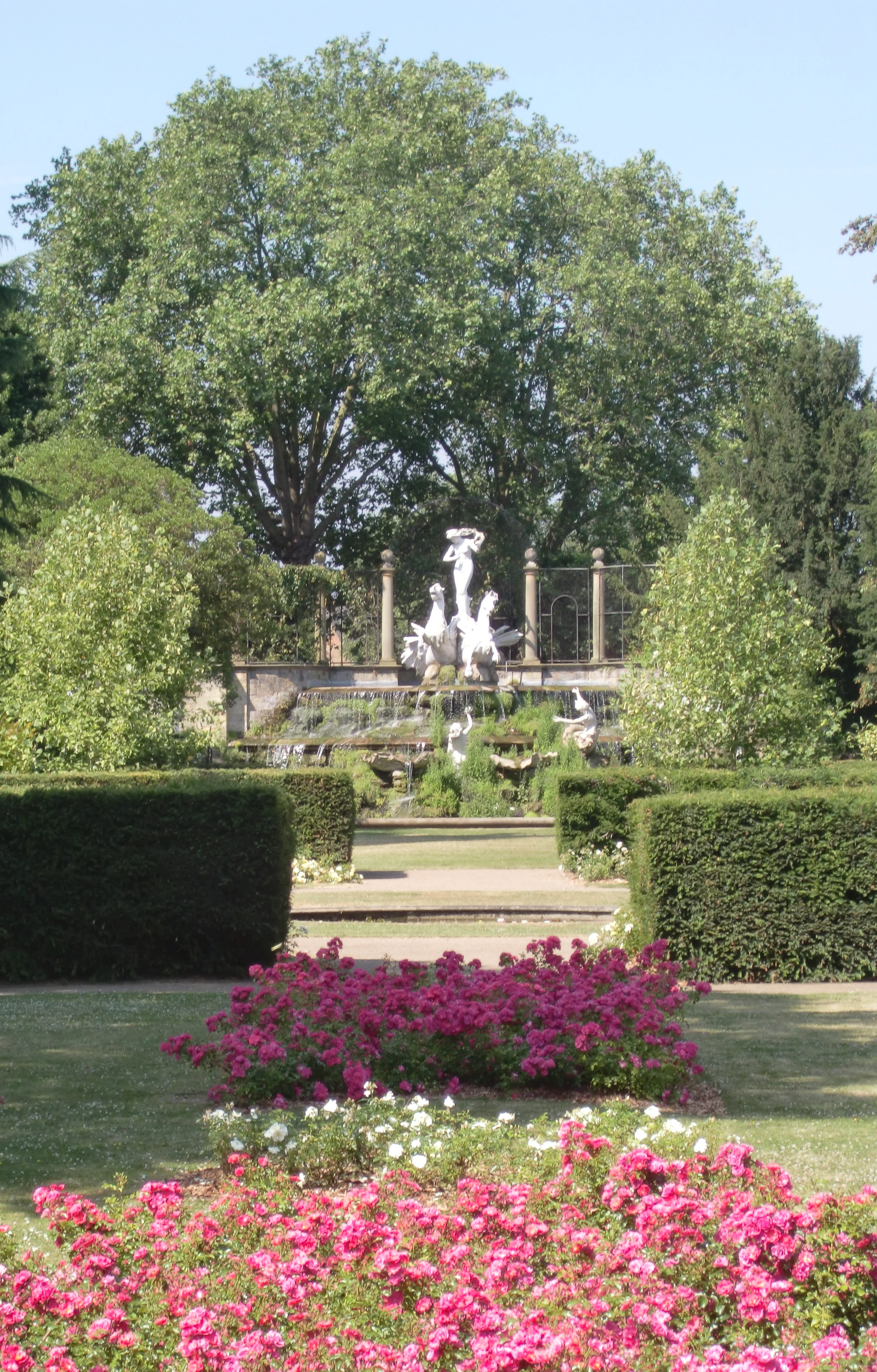
The Naked Ladies dominate the riverside lawns.

The front gardens are largely a public car park and tennis courts. The rear gardens are bisected by a public road but run to the River Thames and are open to the public, with the sunken lawn sometimes used for open-air theatre in the summer. A stone footbridge connects the two halves of the gardens.
