= Hampton Court Palace =

Historic royal palace in Greater London

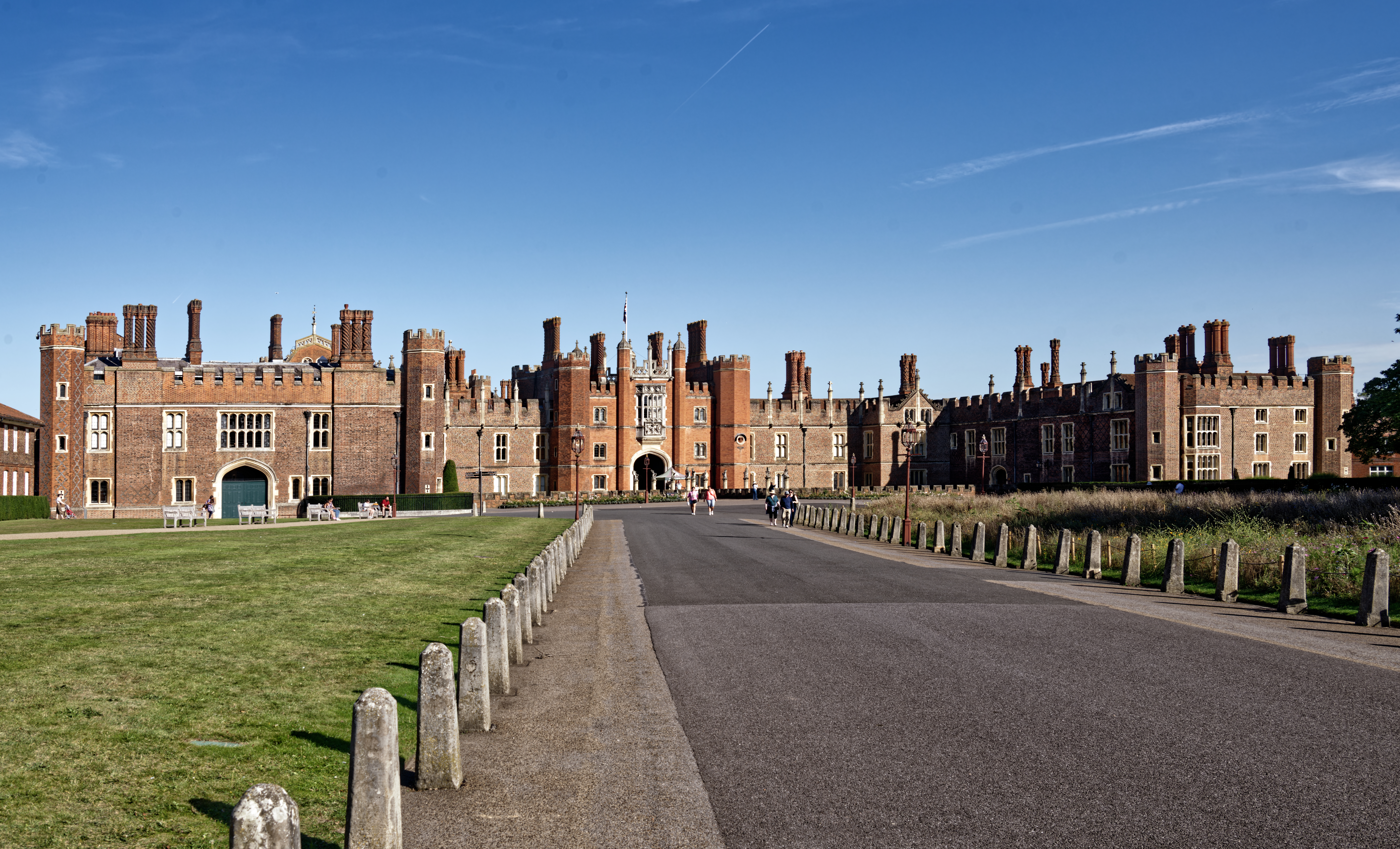
- Hampton Court Palace, west front, Richmond upon Thames

- Location within London Borough of Richmond upon Thames

General information
- Location: Hampton Court, Greater London, England
- Coordinates: 51°24′12″N 0°20′15″W
- Current tenants: Historic Royal Palaces
- Owner: Charles III in right of the Crown

Website
- www.hrp.org.uk/hampton-court-palace/

Listed Building – Grade I
- Official name: Hampton Court Palace
- Designated: 2 September 1952; 74 years ago
- Reference no.: 1193127

Hampton Court Palace is a Grade I listed royal palace in the London Borough of Richmond upon Thames, 12 miles (19 kilometres) southwest and upstream of central London on the River Thames.

The building of the palace began in 1514 for Cardinal Thomas Wolsey, Archbishop of York and the chief minister of Henry VIII. In 1529, as Wolsey fell from favour, the cardinal gave the palace to the king to try to save his own life, which was in danger due to Henry VIII's deepening frustration and anger. The palace became one of Henry's most favoured residences; soon after acquiring it, he enlarged it to accommodate his sizeable retinue of courtiers.

In the early 1690s, William III's massive rebuilding and expansion work, which was intended to rival the Palace of Versailles, destroyed much of the Tudor palace. His work ceased in 1703, leaving the palace in two distinct contrasting architectural styles, domestic Tudor and Baroque. While the palace's styles are an accident of fate, a unity exists due to the use of pink bricks and a symmetrical, if vague, balancing of successive low wings. George II was the last monarch to reside in the palace.

The palace structure and its grounds are cared for by an independent charity, Historic Royal Palaces, and are open to the public. The palace displays works of art from the Royal Collection. The palace gardens include the Hampton Court Maze, the royal tennis court, and the world's largest grape vine as of 2005. The palace is the site of the annual Hampton Court Palace Festival and the Hampton Court Garden Festival, held in the Home Park.

== History ==
=== Medieval ===
What would become Hampton Court Palace was originally a property of the Order of St John of Jerusalem. It was leased first to John Wode in the mid-15th century, and then to the statesman Sir Giles Daubeney in 1494. Daubeney expanded the previous structures, and built the Great Kitchens that still survive today (although much altered). After Daubeney's death in 1508, his 14 year-old heir, Henry Daubeney, had to wait until 1514 to inherit his father's possessions. A month later, he relinquished his lease, and the Order of St John of Jerusalem re-leased Hampton Court to Thomas Wolsey.

=== Tudor times ===
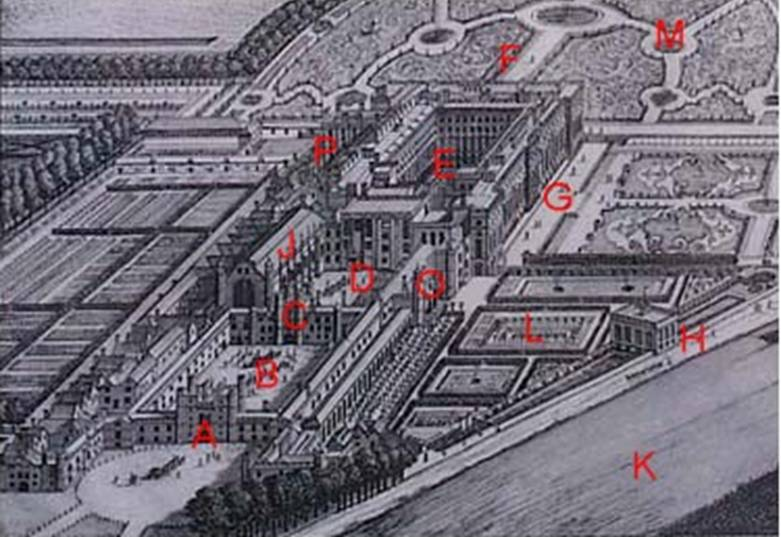
Hampton Court Palace, with marked reference points referred to on this page. A: West Front & Main Entrance; B: Base Court; C: Clock Tower; D: Clock Court, E: Fountain Court; F: East Front; G: South Front; H: Banqueting House; J: Great Hall; K: River Thames; L: Pond Gardens; M: East Gardens; O: Cardinal Wolsey's Rooms; P: Chapel.

Thomas Wolsey, Archbishop of York, chief minister to and a favourite of Henry VIII, took over the site of Hampton Court Palace in 1514. Over the following seven years, Wolsey spent lavishly (200,000 crowns) to build the finest palace in England at Hampton Court. Today, little of Wolsey's building work remains unchanged. The first courtyard, the Base Court, (B on plan), was his creation, as was the second, inner gatehouse (C) which leads to the Clock Court (D) (Wolsey's seal remains visible over the entrance arch of the clock tower) which contained his private rooms (O on plan). The Base Court contained forty-four lodgings reserved for guests, while the second court (today, Clock Court) contained the very best rooms – the state apartments – reserved for the king and his family. Henry VIII stayed in the state apartments as Wolsey's guest immediately after their completion in 1525.

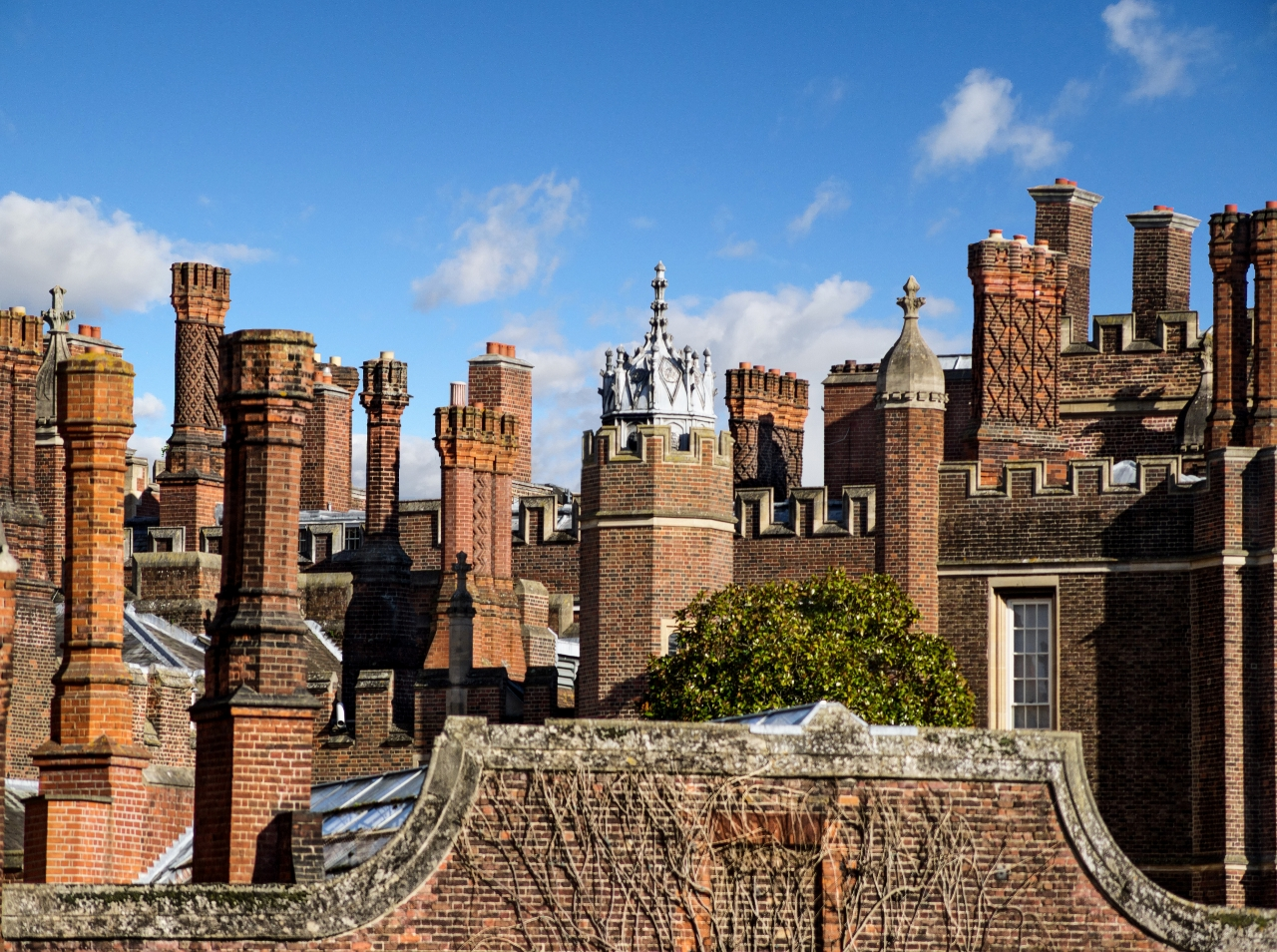
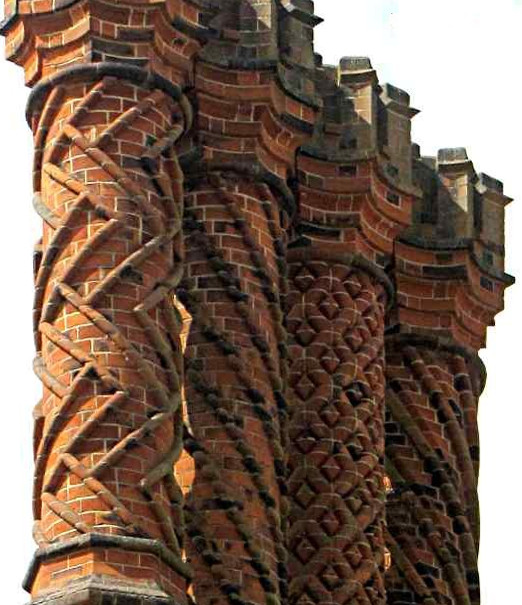
Decorative Tudor brick chimneys at Hampton Court Palace

In building his palace, Wolsey was attempting to create a Renaissance cardinal's palace of a rectilinear symmetrical plan with grand apartments on a raised piano nobile, all rendered with classical detailing. The historian Jonathan Foyle has suggested that it is likely that Wolsey had been inspired by Paolo Cortese's De Cardinalatu, a manual for cardinals that included advice on palatial architecture, published in 1510. The architectural historian Sir John Summerson asserts that the palace shows "the essence of Wolsey – the plain English churchman who nevertheless made his sovereign the arbiter of Europe and who built and furnished Hampton Court to show foreign embassies that Henry VIII's chief minister knew how to live as graciously as any cardinal in Rome." Whatever the concepts were, the architecture is an excellent and rare example of a thirty-year era when English architecture was in a harmonious transition from domestic Tudor, strongly influenced by perpendicular Gothic, to the Italian Renaissance classical style. Perpendicular Gothic owed nothing historically to the Renaissance style, yet harmonised well with it. This blending of styles was realised by a small group of Italian craftsmen working at the English court in the second and third decades of the sixteenth century. They specialised in the adding of Renaissance ornament to otherwise straightforward Tudor buildings. It was one of these, Giovanni da Maiano, who was responsible for the set of eight relief busts of Roman emperors which were set in the Tudor brickwork.

Henry VIII and his courtiers visited Wolsey at Hampton Court in masque costume in January 1527, disguised as shepherds to play mumchance and dance. Wolsey was only to enjoy his palace for a few years. In 1529, knowing that his enemies and the King were engineering his downfall, he passed the palace to the King as a gift. Wolsey died in 1530.

Within six months of coming into ownership, the King began his own rebuilding and expansion. Henry VIII's court consisted of over one thousand people. While the King owned over sixty houses and palaces, few of these were large enough to hold the assembled court, and thus one of the first of the King's building works (in order to transform Hampton Court to a principal residence) was to build the vast kitchens. These were quadrupled in size in 1529, enabling the King to provide bouche of court (free food and drink) for his entire court. The architecture of King Henry's new palace followed the design precedent set by Wolsey: perpendicular Gothic-inspired Tudor with restrained Renaissance ornament. This hybrid architecture was to remain almost unchanged for nearly a century, until Inigo Jones introduced strong classical influences from Italy to the London palaces of the first Stuart kings.

The hammerbeam roof of the Great Hall, together with the Abraham Tapestries

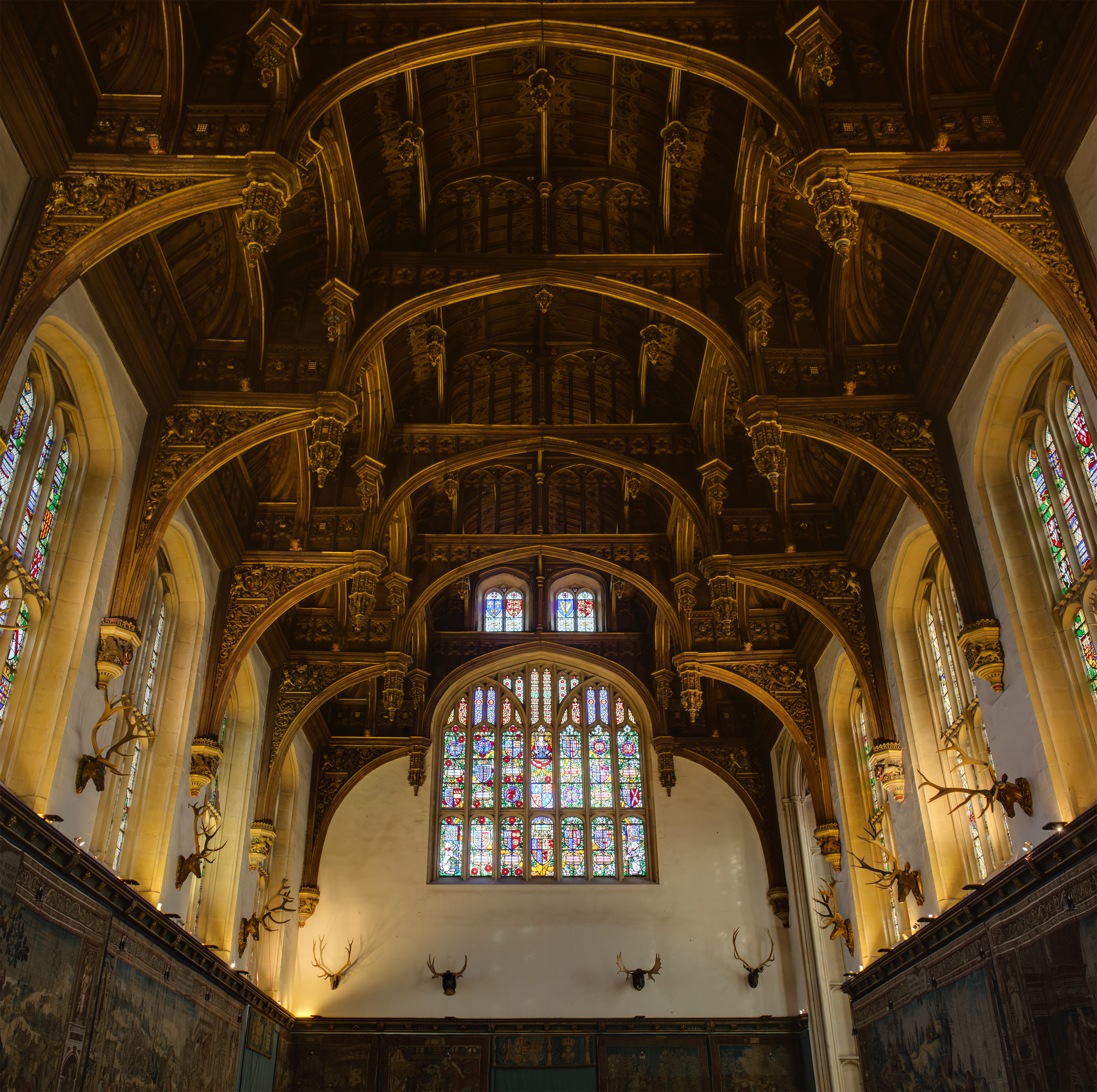

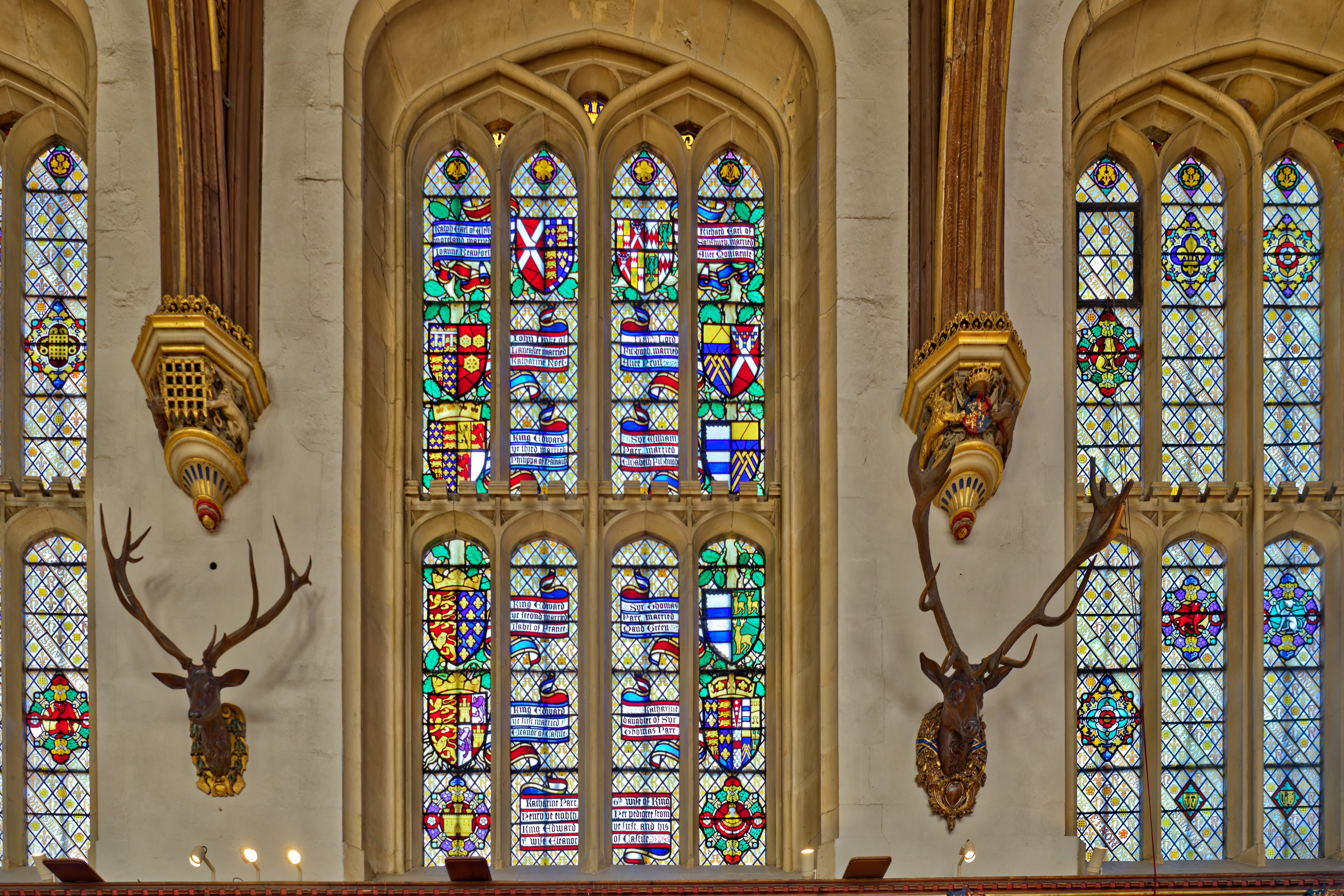

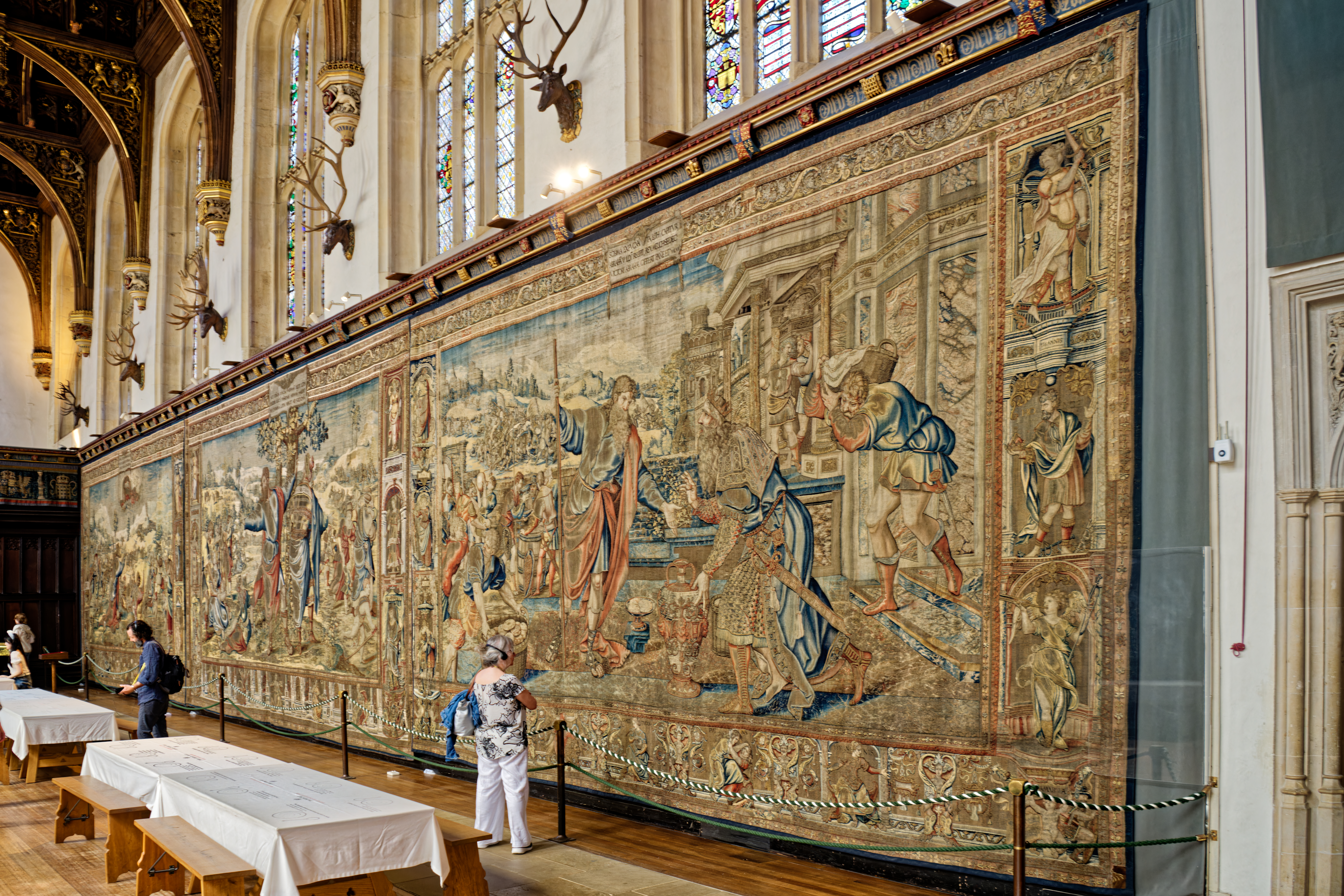

Between 1532 and 1535 Henry added the Great Hall (the last medieval great hall built for the English monarchy) and the Royal Tennis Court. The Great Hall has a carved hammerbeam roof. During Tudor times, this was the most important room of the palace: here, the King would dine in state seated at a table upon a raised dais. The hall took five years to complete; so impatient was the King for completion that the masons were compelled to work throughout the night by candlelight.

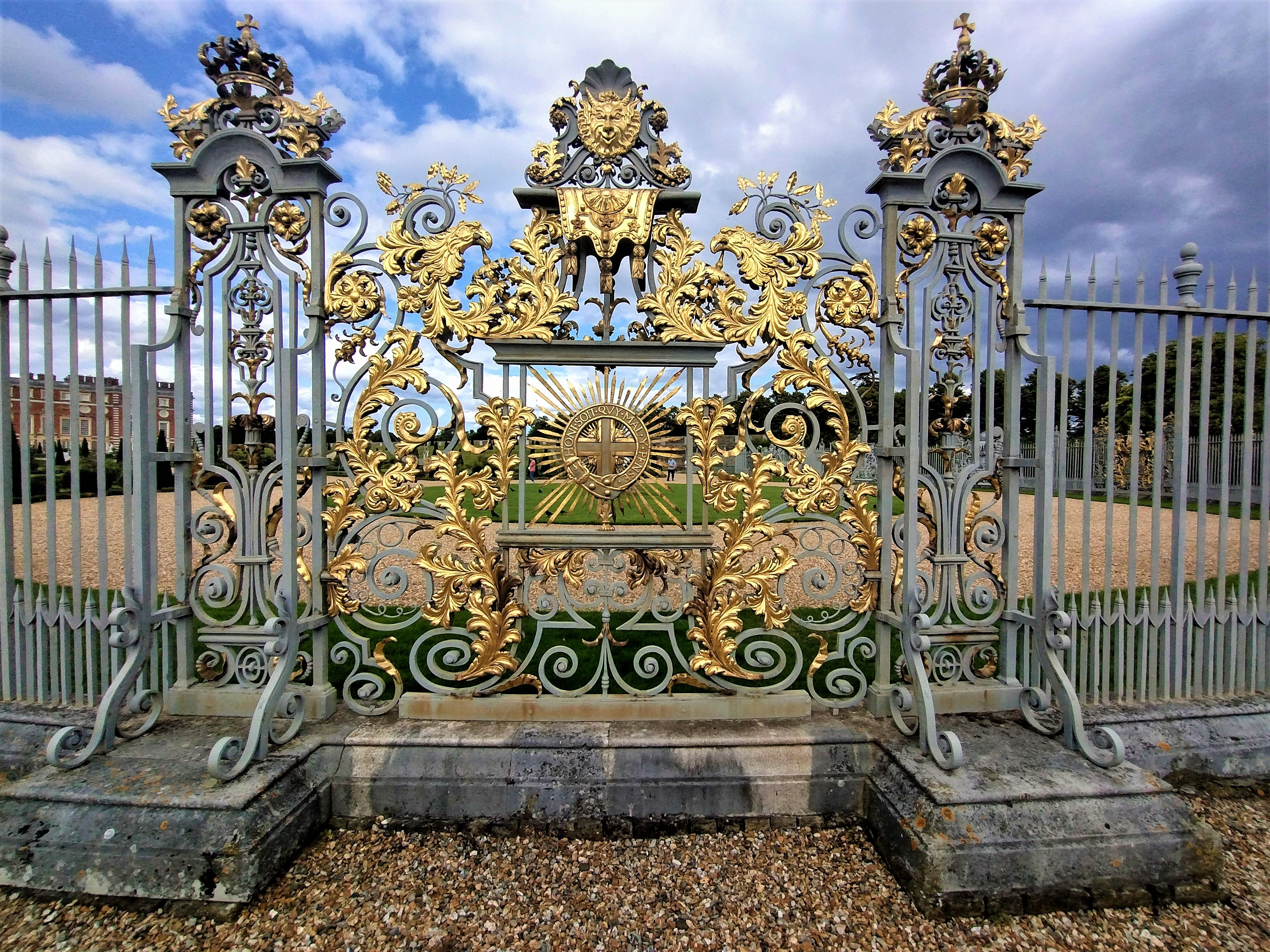
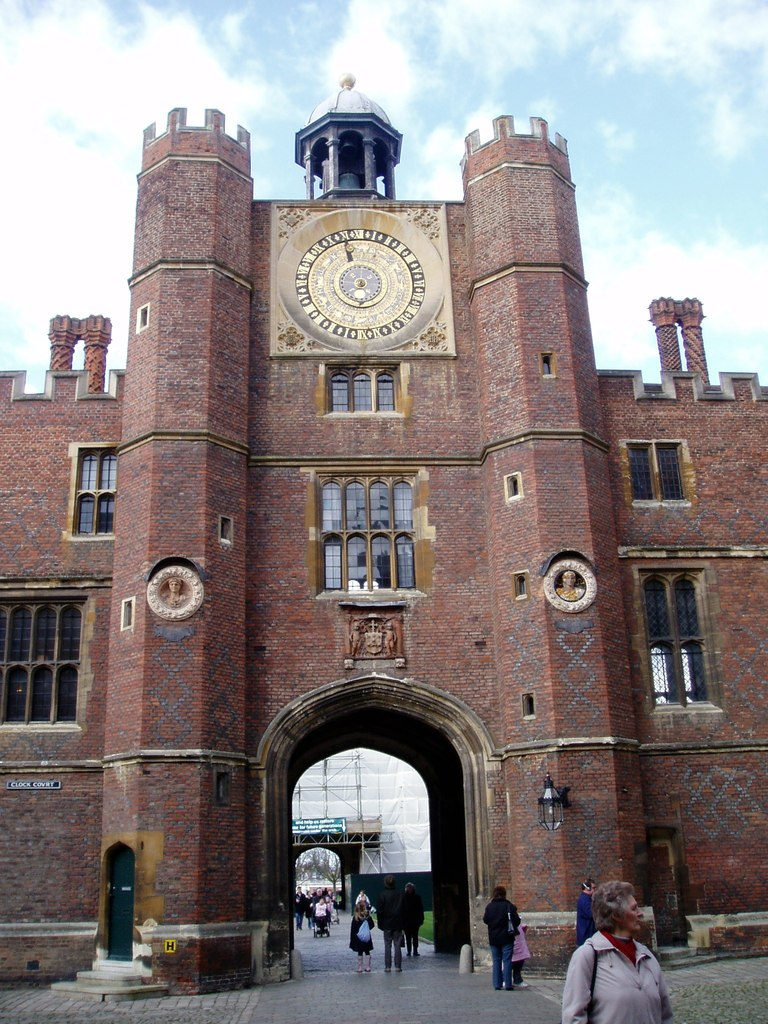
Thames riverside gate, now closed. August 2023 (left) Anne Boleyn's Gate. The Tudor gatehouse and astronomical clock, made for Henry VIII in 1540 (C on plan above). Two of the Renaissance bas reliefs by Giovanni da Maiano can be seen set into the brickwork. (right)

The gatehouse to the second, inner court was adorned in 1540 with the Hampton Court astronomical clock, an early example of a pre-Copernican astronomical clock. Still functioning, the clock shows the time of day, the phases of the moon, the month, the quarter of the year, the date, the sun and star sign, and high water at London Bridge. This last item was of great importance to those visiting this Thames-side palace from London, as the preferred method of transport at the time was by barge, and at low water London Bridge created dangerous rapids. This gatehouse is also known today as Anne Boleyn's gate, after Henry's second wife. Work was still under way on Anne Boleyn's apartments above the gate when Boleyn was beheaded.

During the Tudor period, the palace was the scene of many historic events. In 1537, the King's much desired male heir, the future Edward VI, was born at the palace, and the child's mother, Jane Seymour, died there two weeks later. Four years afterwards, whilst attending Mass in the palace's chapel, the King was informed of the adultery of his fifth wife, Catherine Howard. She was then confined to her room for a few days before being sent to Syon House and then on to the Tower of London. Legend claims she briefly escaped her guards and ran through the Haunted Gallery to beg Henry for her life but she was recaptured.

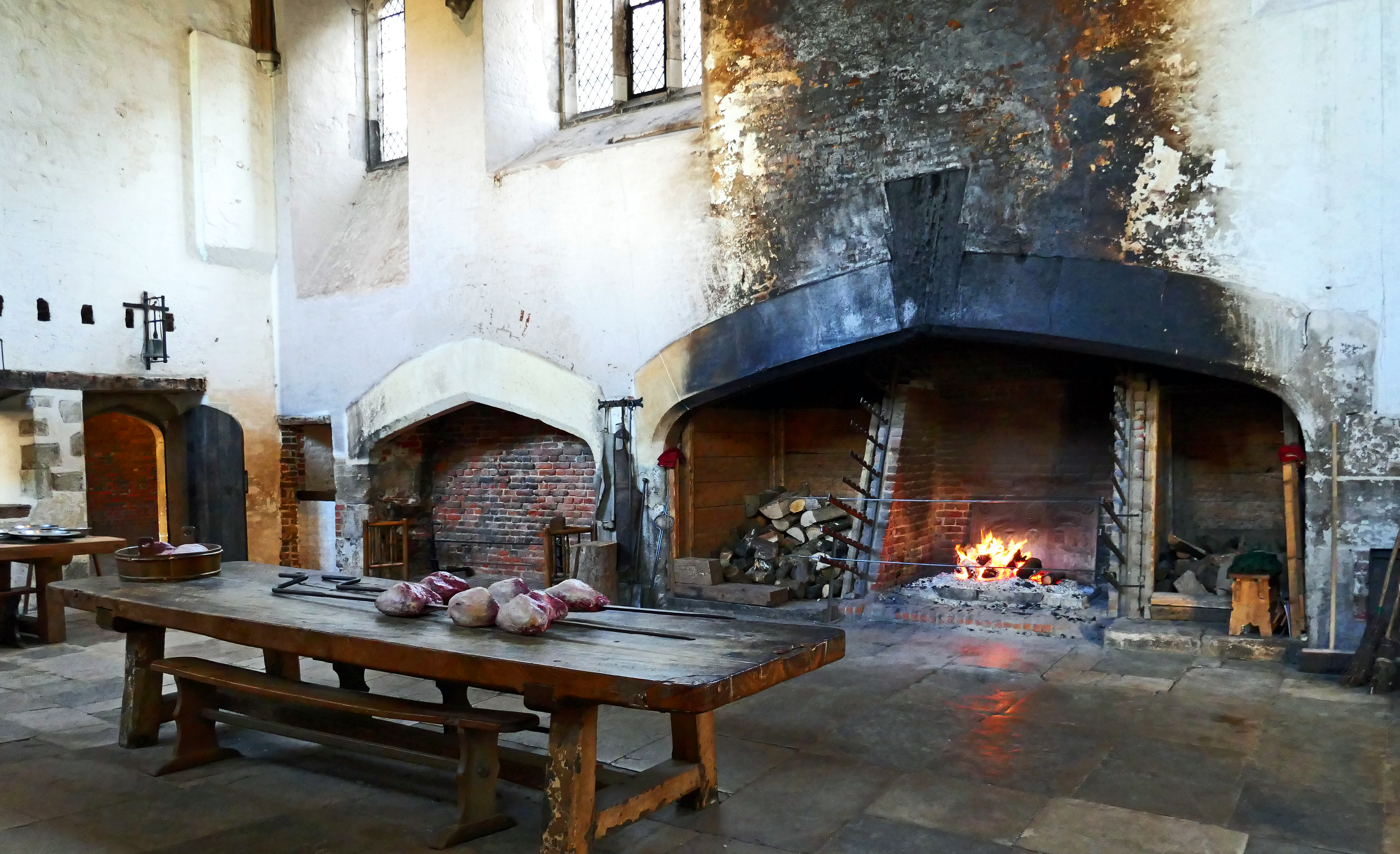
An original Tudor roasting hearth in the Great Kitchens

King Henry died in January 1547 and was succeeded by his son Edward VI, and then by both his daughters in turn. It was to Hampton Court that Queen Mary I (Henry's elder daughter) retreated with King Philip to spend her honeymoon, after their wedding at Winchester. Mary chose Hampton Court as the place for the birth of her first child, which turned out to be the first of two phantom pregnancies. Mary had initially wanted to give birth at Windsor Castle as it was a more secure location, and she was still fearful of rebellion. But Hampton Court was considerably larger and could accommodate the entire court and more besides. Mary stayed at the palace awaiting the birth of the "child" for over five months, and only left because of the uninhabitable state of the palace due to the court being kept in the one location for so long. Her court departed for the much smaller Oatlands Palace. Mary was succeeded by her half-sister, Elizabeth I, and it was Elizabeth who had the eastern (privy) kitchen built; today, this is the palace's public tea room.

=== Stuarts and early Hanoverians ===
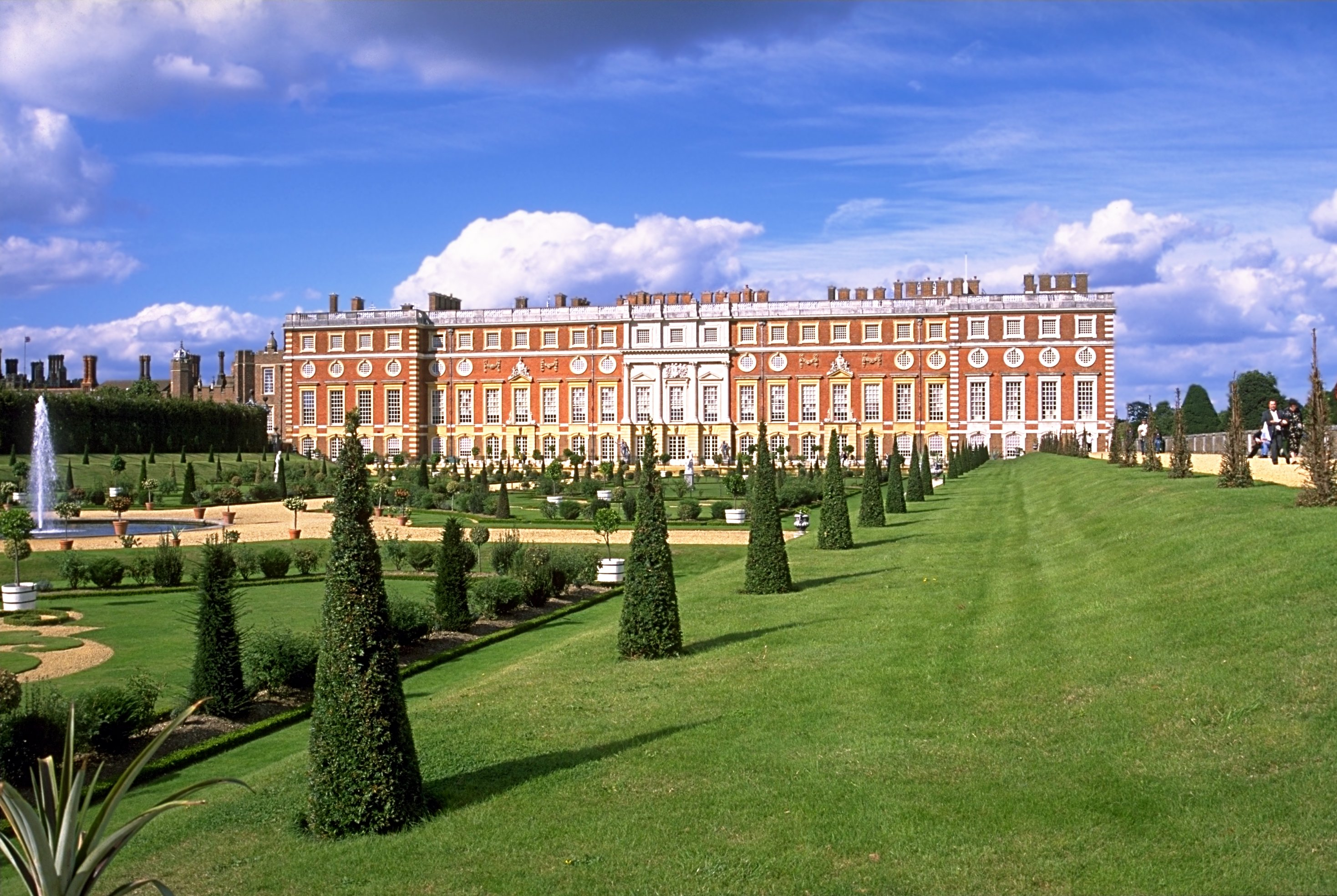
Christopher Wren's south front (G on plan), built for William III and Mary II, viewed from the Privy Garden

The Tudor period came to an end when Elizabeth I died in 1603. She was succeeded as monarch by her first cousin-twice-removed, James I of the House of Stuart, an event known as the Union of the Crowns.

Two entertainments for the Stuart court were staged in the Great Hall in January 1604, The Masque of Indian and China Knights and The Vision of the Twelve Goddesses. On 6 January, Scottish courtiers performed a sword dance for Anne of Denmark. Their dance was compared to a Spanish matachin. Later in 1604, the palace was the site of King James' meeting with representatives of the English Puritans, known as the Hampton Court Conference; while an agreement with the Puritans was not reached, the meeting led to James's commissioning of the King James Version of the Bible.

King James was succeeded in 1625 by his son, the ill-fated Charles I. Hampton Court was to become both his palace and his prison. It was also the setting for his honeymoon with his fifteen-year-old bride, Henrietta Maria in 1625. Following King Charles' execution in 1649, the palace became the property of the Commonwealth presided over by Oliver Cromwell. Unlike some other former royal properties, the palace escaped relatively unscathed. While the government auctioned much of the contents, the building was ignored.

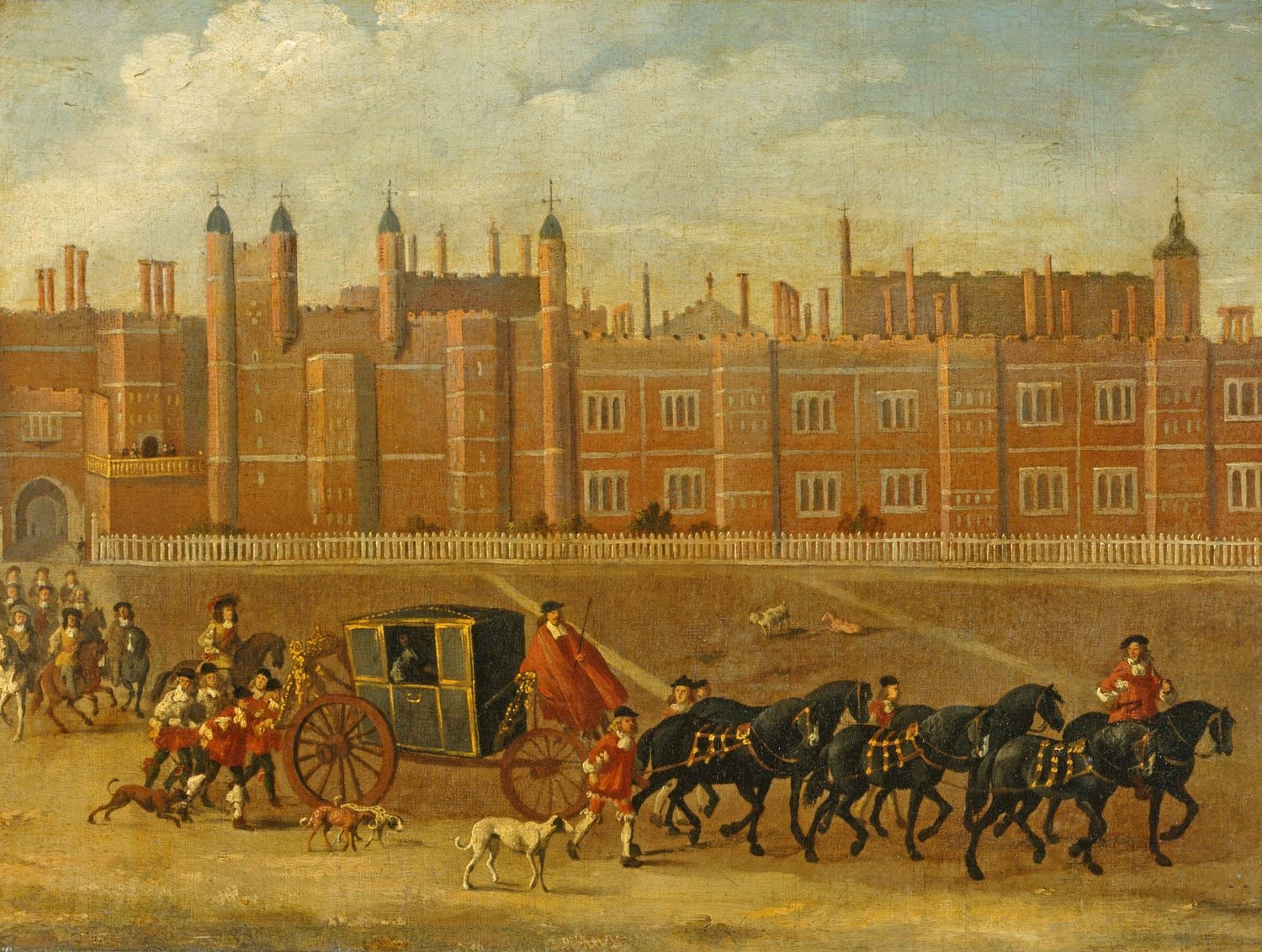
Charles II leaving Hampton Court

After the Restoration, King Charles II and his successor James II visited Hampton Court but largely preferred to reside elsewhere. By current French court standards, Hampton Court now appeared old-fashioned. It was in 1689, shortly after Louis XIV's court had moved permanently to Versailles, that the palace's antiquated state was addressed. England had joint monarchs, William III and Mary II. Within months of their accession, they embarked on a massive rebuilding project at Hampton Court. The intention was to demolish the Tudor palace a section at a time while replacing it with a huge modern palace in the Baroque style retaining only Henry VIII's Great Hall.

The country's most eminent architect, Sir Christopher Wren, was called upon to draw the plans, while the master of works was to be William Talman. The plan was for a vast palace constructed around two courtyards at right angles to each other. Wren's design for a domed palace bore resemblances to the work of Jules Hardouin-Mansart and Louis Le Vau, both architects employed by Louis XIV at Versailles. It has been suggested, though, that the plans were abandoned because the resemblance to Versailles was too subtle and not strong enough; at this time, it was impossible for any sovereign to visualise a palace that did not emulate Versailles' repetitive Baroque form. However, the resemblances are there: while the façades are not so long as those of Versailles, they have similar, seemingly unstoppable repetitive rhythms beneath a long flat skyline. The monotony is even repeated as the façade turns the corner from the east to the south fronts. However, Hampton Court, unlike Versailles, is given an extra dimension by the contrast between the pink brick and the pale Portland stone quoins, frames and banding. Further diversion is added by the circular and decorated windows of the second-floor mezzanine. This theme is repeated in the inner Fountain Court, but the rhythm is faster and the windows, unpedimented on the outer façades, are given pointed pediments in the courtyard; this has led the courtyard to be described as "Startling, as of simultaneous exposure to a great many eyes with raised eyebrows."

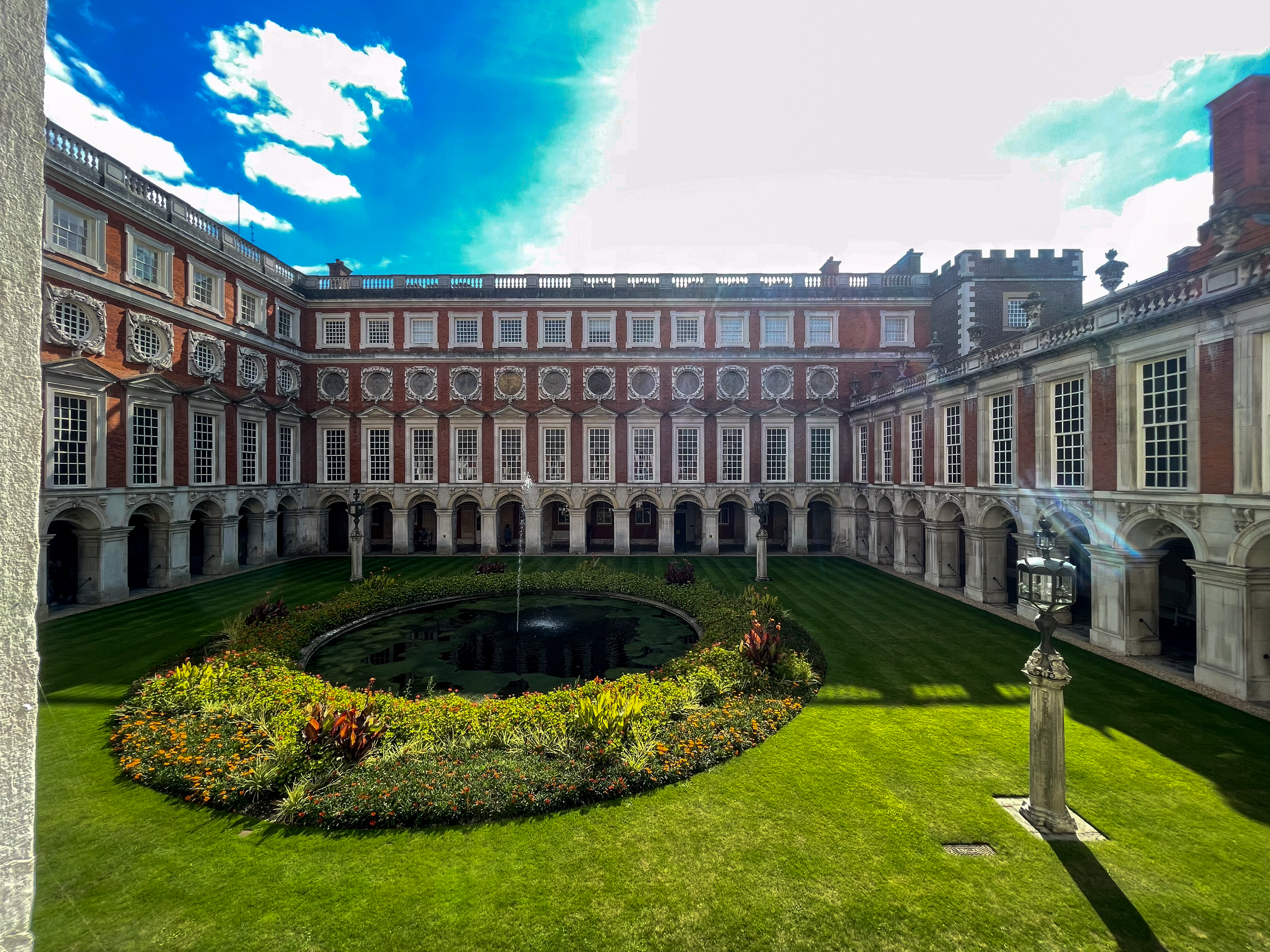
The Fountain Court designed by Sir Christopher Wren (E on plan): "Startling, as of simultaneous exposure to a great many eyes with raised eyebrows"

During this work, half the Tudor palace was replaced and Henry VIII's staterooms and private apartments were both lost; the new wings around the Fountain Court contained new state apartments and private rooms, one set for the King and one for the Queen. Each suite of state rooms was accessed by a state staircase. The royal suites were of completely equal value in order to reflect William and Mary's unique status as joint sovereigns. The King's Apartments face south over the Privy Garden, the Queen's east over the Fountain Garden. The suites are linked by a gallery running the length of the east façade, another reference to Versailles, where the King and Queen's apartments are linked by the Hall of Mirrors. However, at Hampton Court, the linking gallery is of more modest proportions and decoration. The King's staircase was decorated with frescos by Antonio Verrio and delicate ironwork by Jean Tijou. Other artists commissioned to decorate the rooms included Grinling Gibbons, Sir James Thornhill and Jacques Rousseau; furnishings were designed by Daniel Marot.

The King's staircase, originally called The Great Staircase. The murals on the walls were painted by Antonio Verrio.

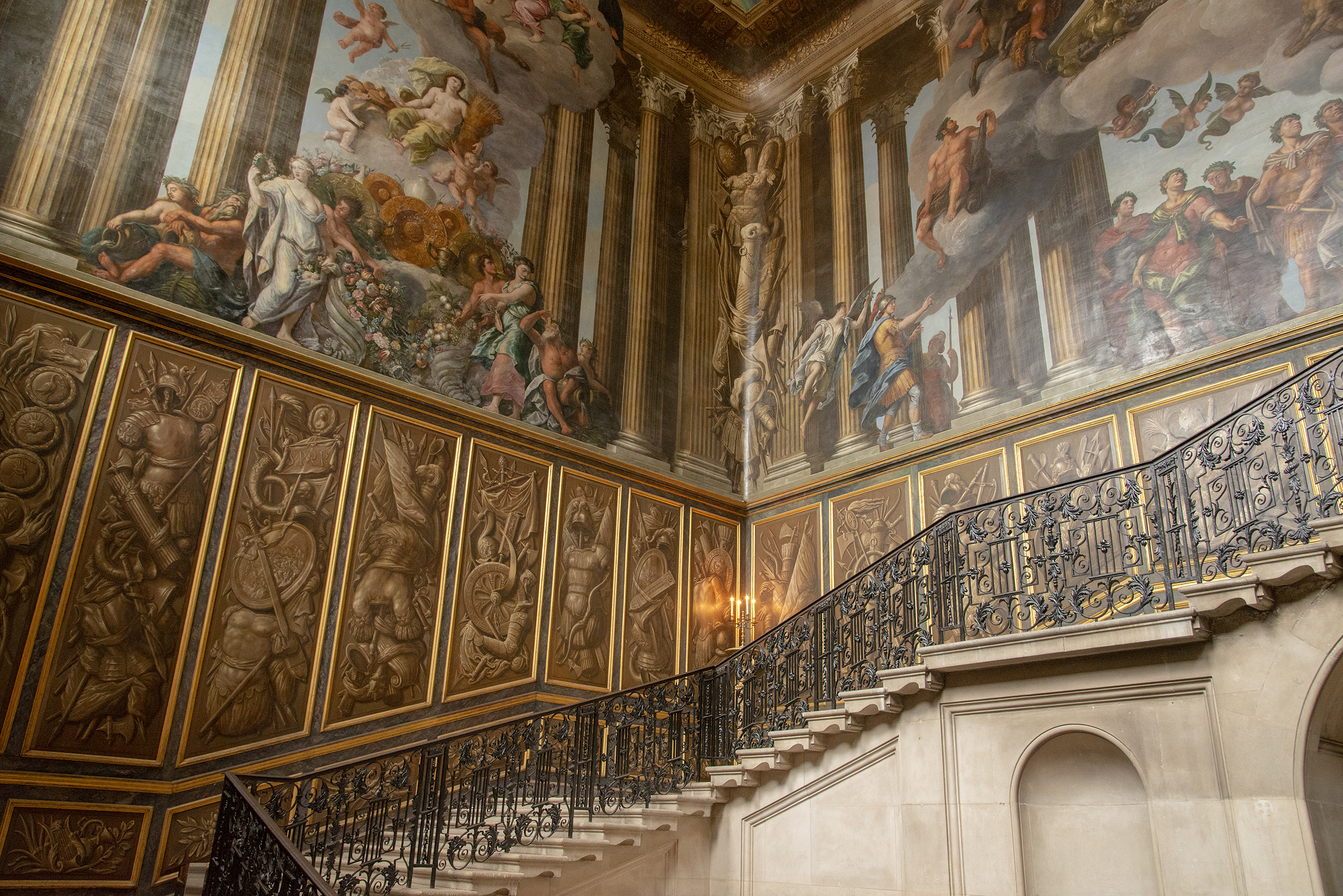

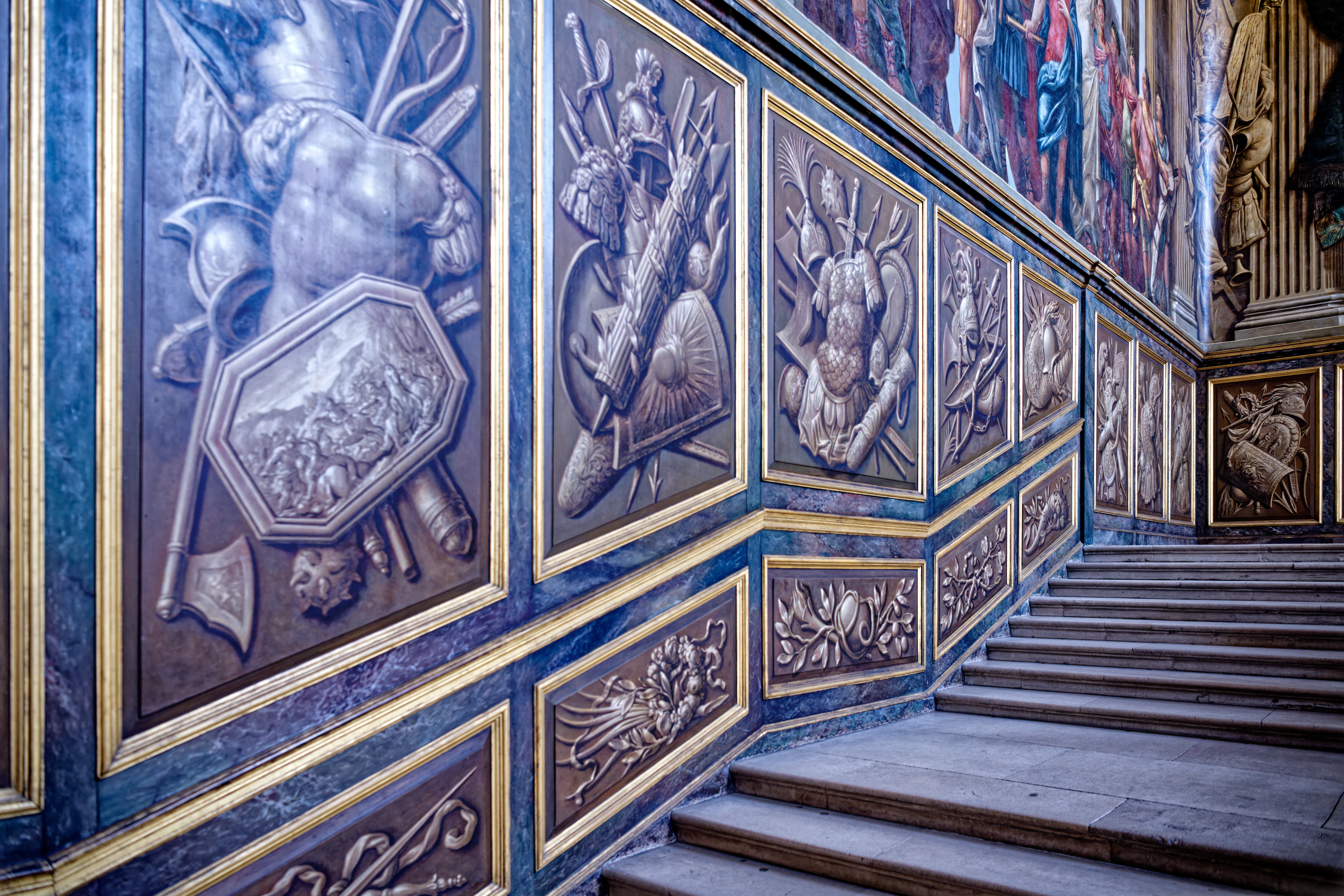

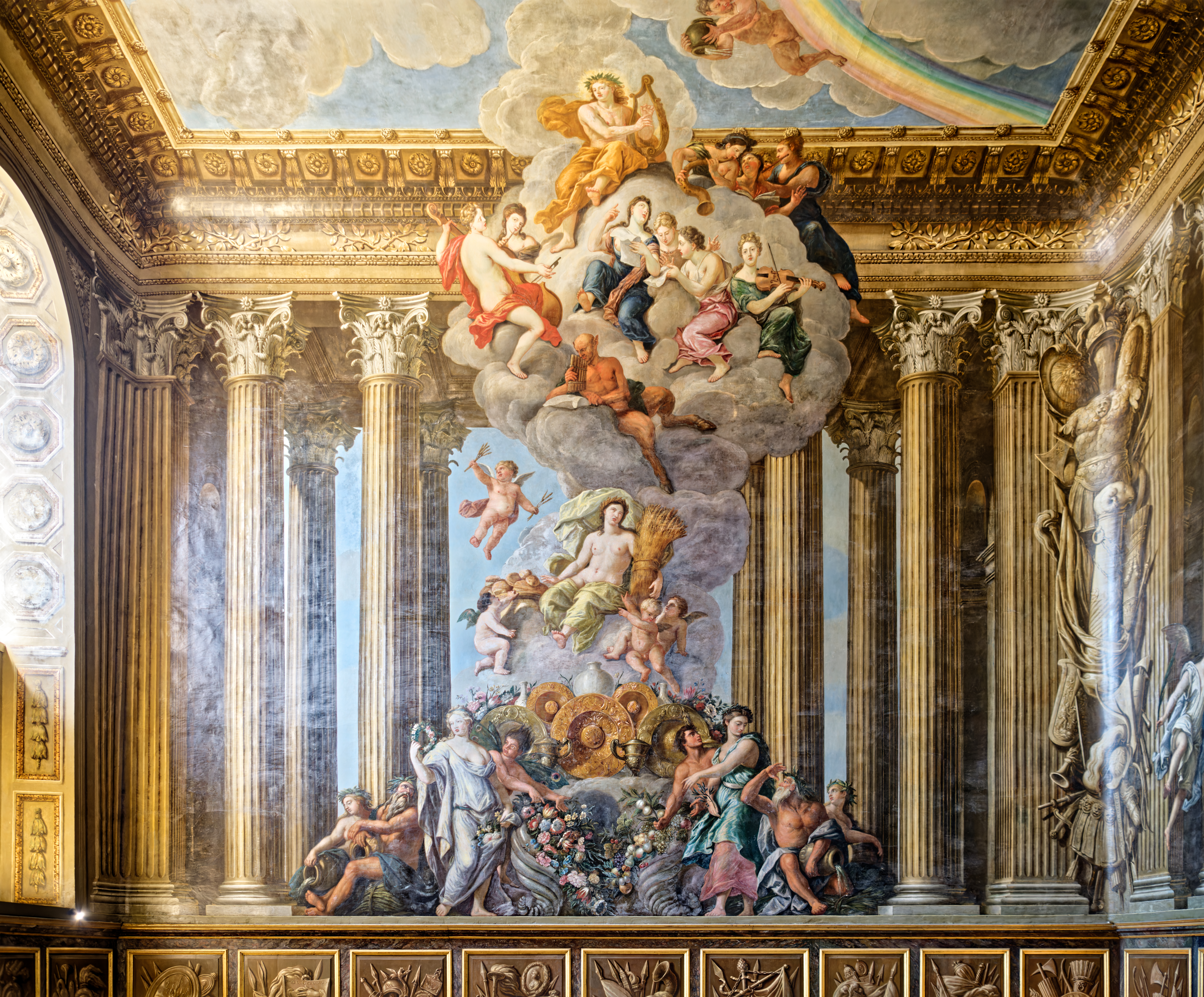

After the death of Queen Mary, King William lost interest in the renovations, and work ceased. However, it was in Hampton Court Park in 1702 that he fell from his horse, later dying from his injuries at Kensington Palace. He was succeeded by his sister-in-law Queen Anne who continued the decoration and completion of the state apartments. On Queen Anne's death in 1714 the House of Stuart's rule came to an end.

Queen Anne's successor was George I; he and his son George II were the last monarchs to reside at Hampton Court. Under George I six rooms were completed in 1717 to the design of John Vanbrugh. Under George II and his wife, Caroline of Ansbach, further refurbishment took place, with the architect William Kent employed to design new furnishings and décor including the Queen's Staircase, (1733) and the Cumberland Suite (1737) for the Duke of Cumberland. Today, the Queen's Private Apartments are open to the public.

=== Later use ===
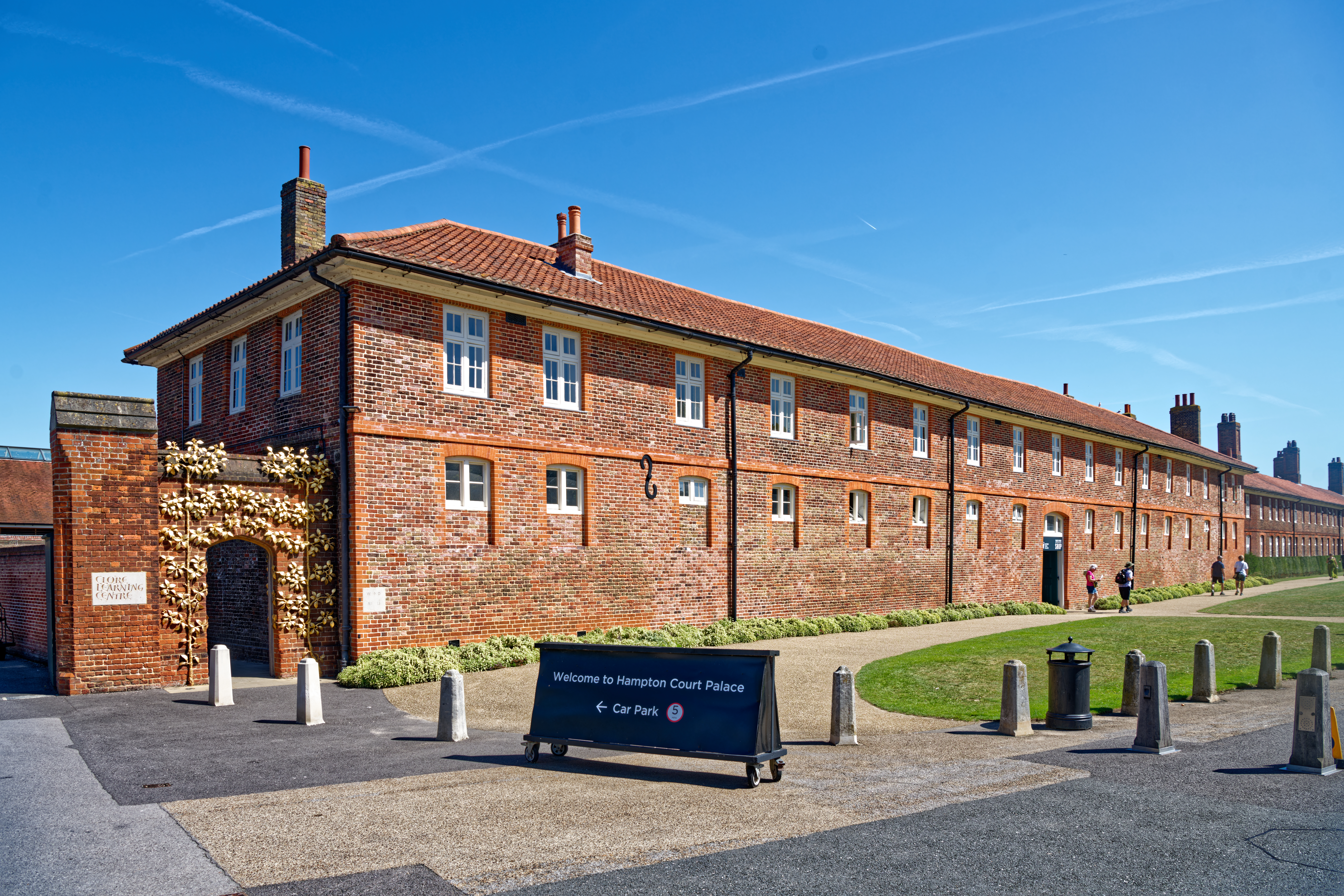
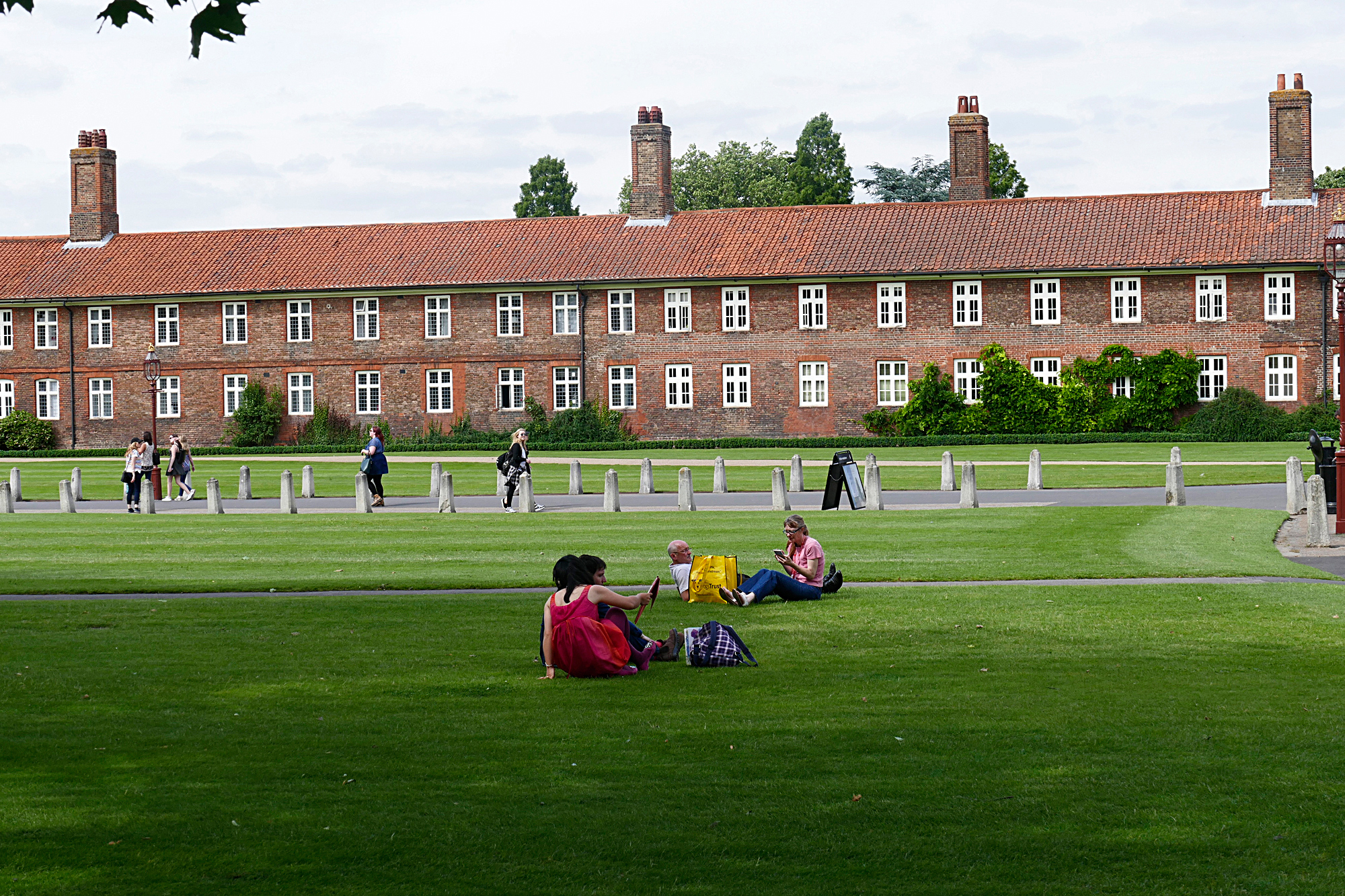
The Barrack Block, which housed several Grace and Favour apartments, at Hampton Court

Since the reign of King George II, no monarch has resided at Hampton Court. In fact, George III, from the moment of his accession, never set foot in the palace: he associated the state apartments with a humiliating scene when his grandfather, George II, had once struck him following an innocent remark. He did however have the Great Vine planted there in 1763 and had the top two storeys of the Great Gatehouse removed in 1773.

From the 1760s, the palace was used to house grace and favour residents. Many of the palace rooms were adapted to be rent-free apartments, with vacant ones allocated by the Lord Chamberlain to applicants to reward past services rendered to the Crown. From 1862 to his death in 1867, the scientist and pioneer of electricity Michael Faraday lived here. William V was granted the Cumberland Suite of rooms, the Queen's Guard Chamber, and the Queen's Presence Chamber from his exile in 1795 until his return to Europe in 1802. In 1896, Princess Sophia Duleep Singh was granted Michael Faraday's old lodgings, by then known as Faraday House, and lived there until her death in 1948. Grand Duchess Xenia Alexandrovna of Russia lived in Wilderness House, in the palace gardens, from 1937 to 1960. From the 1960s the number of new residents declined, with the last admitted in the 1980s. However existing residents could continue to live there. In 2005 three remained, with none by 2017.

In 1796, the Great Hall was restored and in 1838, during the reign of Queen Victoria, the restoration was completed and the palace opened to the public. The heavy-handed restoration plan at this time reduced the Great Gatehouse (A), the palace's principal entrance, by two storeys and removed the lead cupolas adorning its four towers. Once opened, the palace soon became a major tourist attraction and, by 1881, over ten million visits had been recorded. Visitors arrived both by boat from London and via Hampton Court railway station, opened in February 1849.

On 2 September 1952, the palace was given statutory protection by being Grade I listed. Other buildings and structures within the grounds are separately Grade I listed, including the early 16th-century tilt yard tower (the only surviving example of the five original towers); Christopher Wren's Lion gate built for Anne and George I; and the Tudor and 17th-century perimeter walls.

In 1986, the palace was damaged by a major fire, which spread to the King's Apartments. The fire claimed the life of Lady Daphne Gale, widow of General Sir Richard Gale, who resided in a grace and favour apartment. She was in the habit of taking a lighted candle to her bedroom at night, which is thought to have started the fire. The Hampton Court fire led to a new programme of restoration work which was completed in 1990. The Royal School of Needlework moved to premises within the palace from Princes Gate in Kensington 1987, and the palace also houses the headquarters of Historic Royal Palaces, a charitable foundation.

=== 21st century ===
The location was used for a performance of The Six Wives of Henry VIII by rock keyboardist Rick Wakeman in 2009.

The palace was the venue for the Road Cycling Time Trial of the 2012 Summer Olympics and temporary structures for the event, including a set of thrones for time trialists in the medal positions, were installed in the grounds.

In 2015, Hampton Court celebrated the 500th anniversary of the groundbreaking of construction of the palace. The celebrations included daily dramatised historical scenes. The palace's construction began on 12 February 1515.

On 9 February the following year, Vincent Nichols, the Catholic archbishop of Westminster, celebrated vespers in the Chapel Royal. This was the first Catholic service held at the palace for 450 years, and the first since the Elizabethan Religious Settlement established Protestantism as the national denomination.

== Contents ==
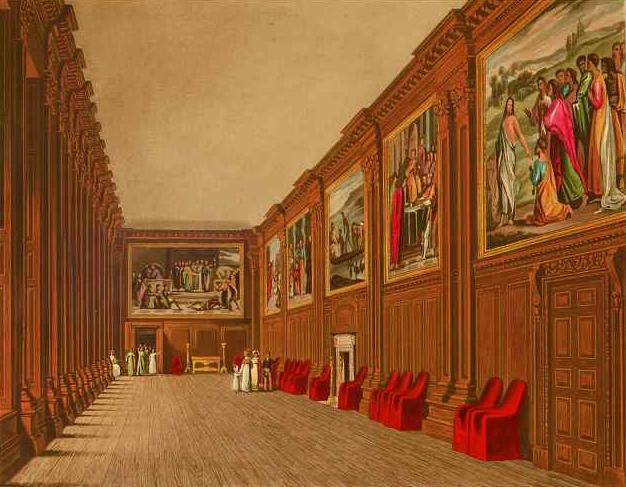
The Cartoon Gallery at Hampton Court

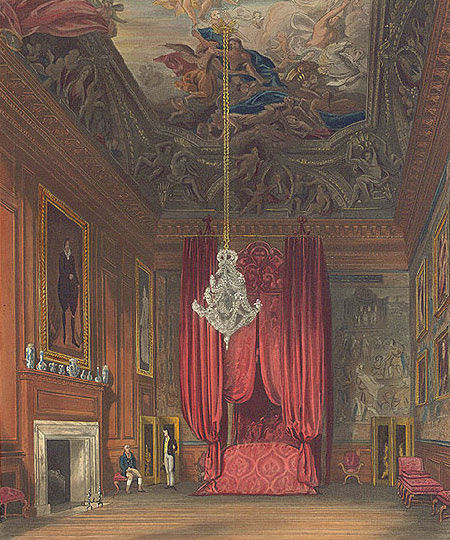
Queen Mary II's Bedchamber, also known as Queen Caroline's State Bedchamber

The palace houses many works of art and furnishings from the Royal Collection, mainly dating from the two principal periods of the palace's construction, the early Tudor (Renaissance) and the late Stuart to the early Georgian period. In September 2015, the Royal Collection recorded 542 works (only those with images) as being located at Hampton Court, mostly paintings and furniture, but also ceramics and sculpture. The full current list can be obtained from their website. The single most important work is Andrea Mantegna's Triumphs of Caesar housed in the Lower Orangery. The palace once housed the Raphael Cartoons, now kept at the Victoria and Albert Museum. Their former home, the Cartoon Gallery on the south side of the Fountain Court, was designed by Christopher Wren; copies painted in the 1690s by a minor artist, Henry Cooke, are now displayed in their place. Also on display are important collections of ceramics, including numerous pieces of blue and white porcelain collected by Queen Mary II, both Chinese imports and Delftware.

Much of the original furniture dates from the late 17th and early 18th centuries, including tables by Jean Pelletier, "India back" walnut chairs by Thomas Roberts and clocks and a barometer by Thomas Tompion. Several state beds are still in their original positions, as is the Throne Canopy in the King's Privy Chamber. This room contains a crystal chandelier of c. 1700, possibly the first such in the country.

The King's Guard Chamber contains a large quantity of arms: muskets, pistols, swords, daggers, powder horns and pieces of armour arranged on the walls in decorative patterns. Bills exist for payment to a John Harris, dated 1699, for an arrangement believed to be that still seen today.

In addition, Hampton Court holds the majority of the Royal Ceremonial Dress Collection, with a smaller amount being held at Kensington Palace, where it is displayed. The collection of over 10,000 items includes clothing, sketches, letters, prints, photographs, diaries and scrapbooks. The dress collection has designated status from Arts Council England.

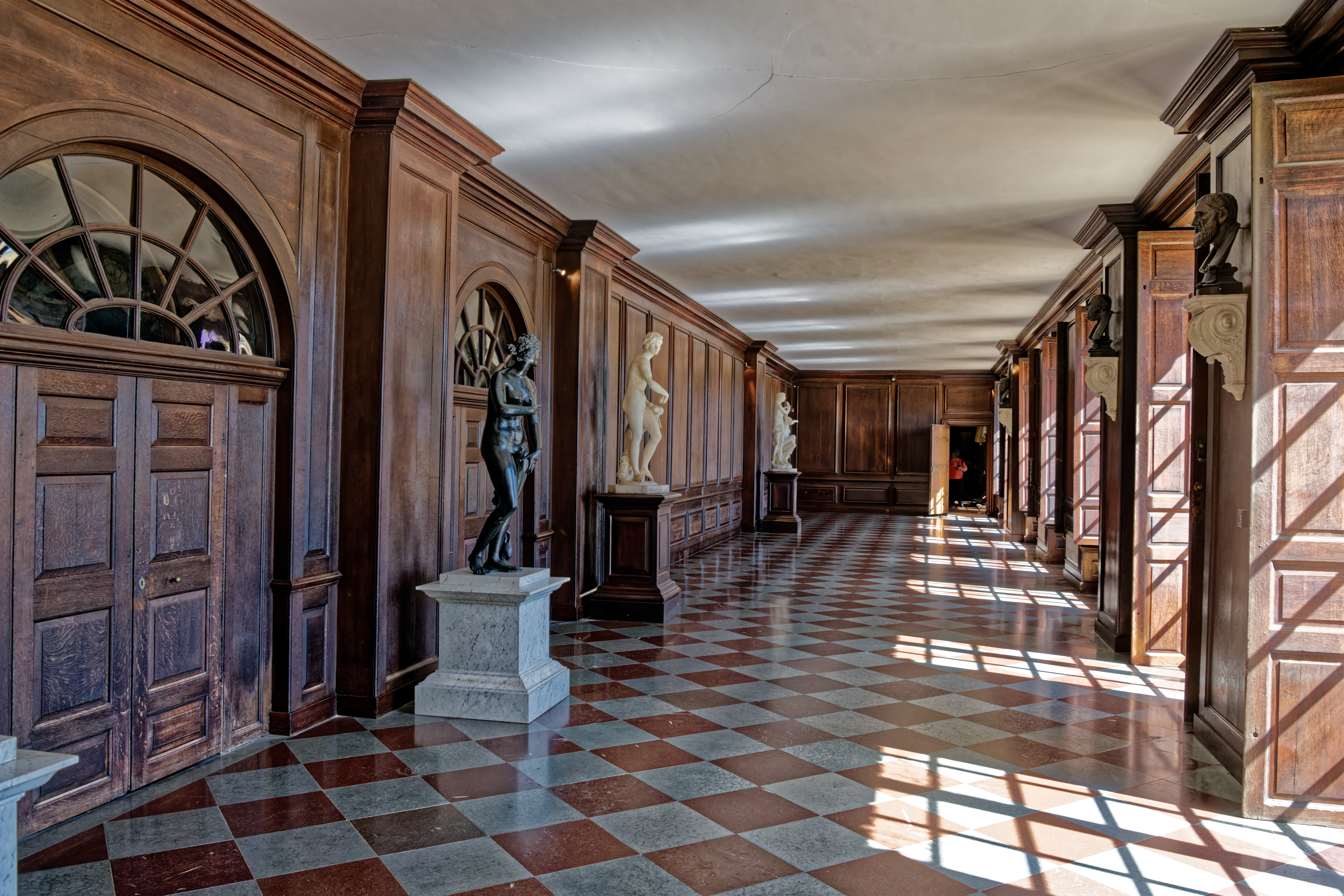
Interior view of William III's Apartments

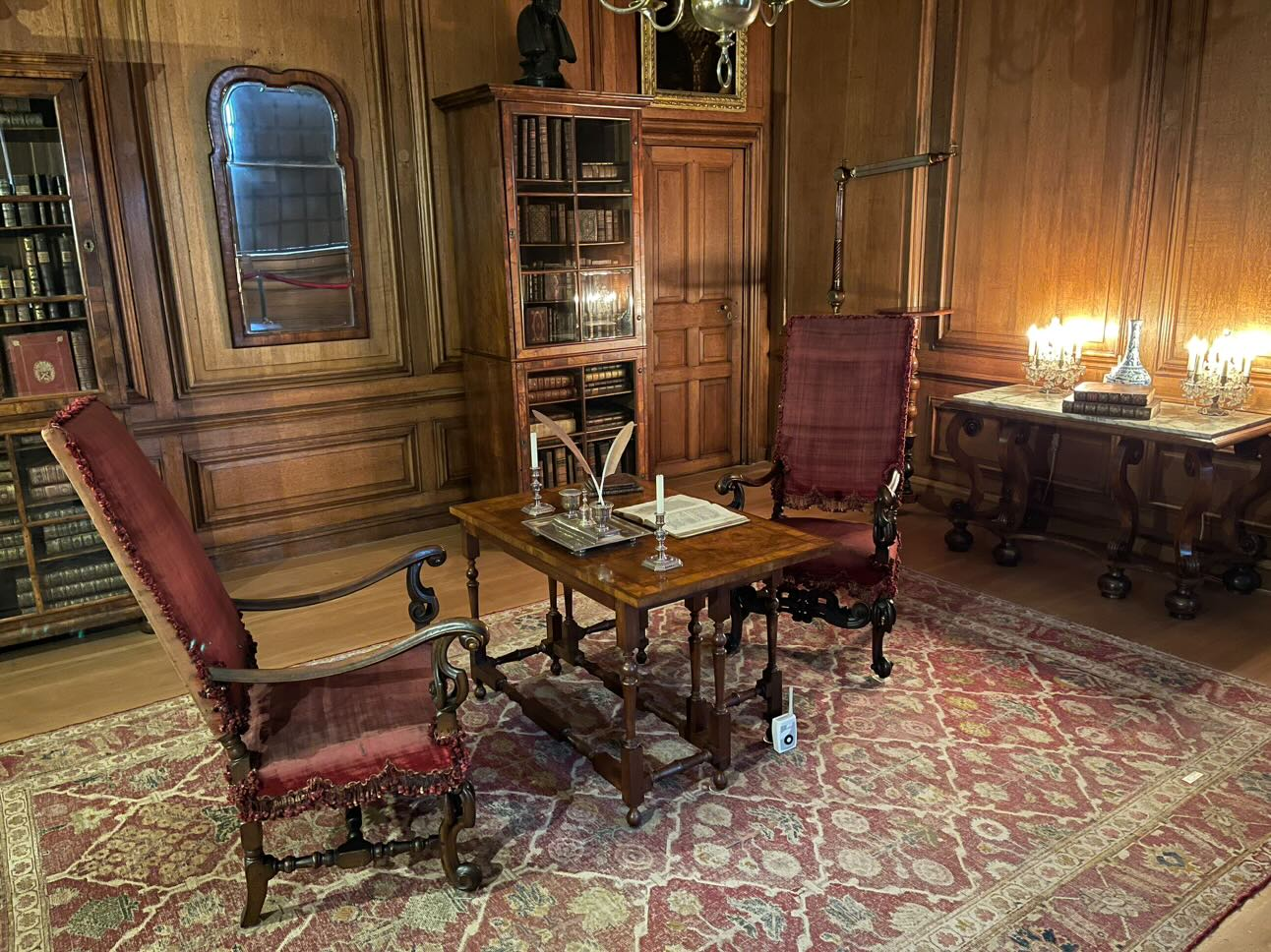
One of the Closets in the Private Apartments of King William III

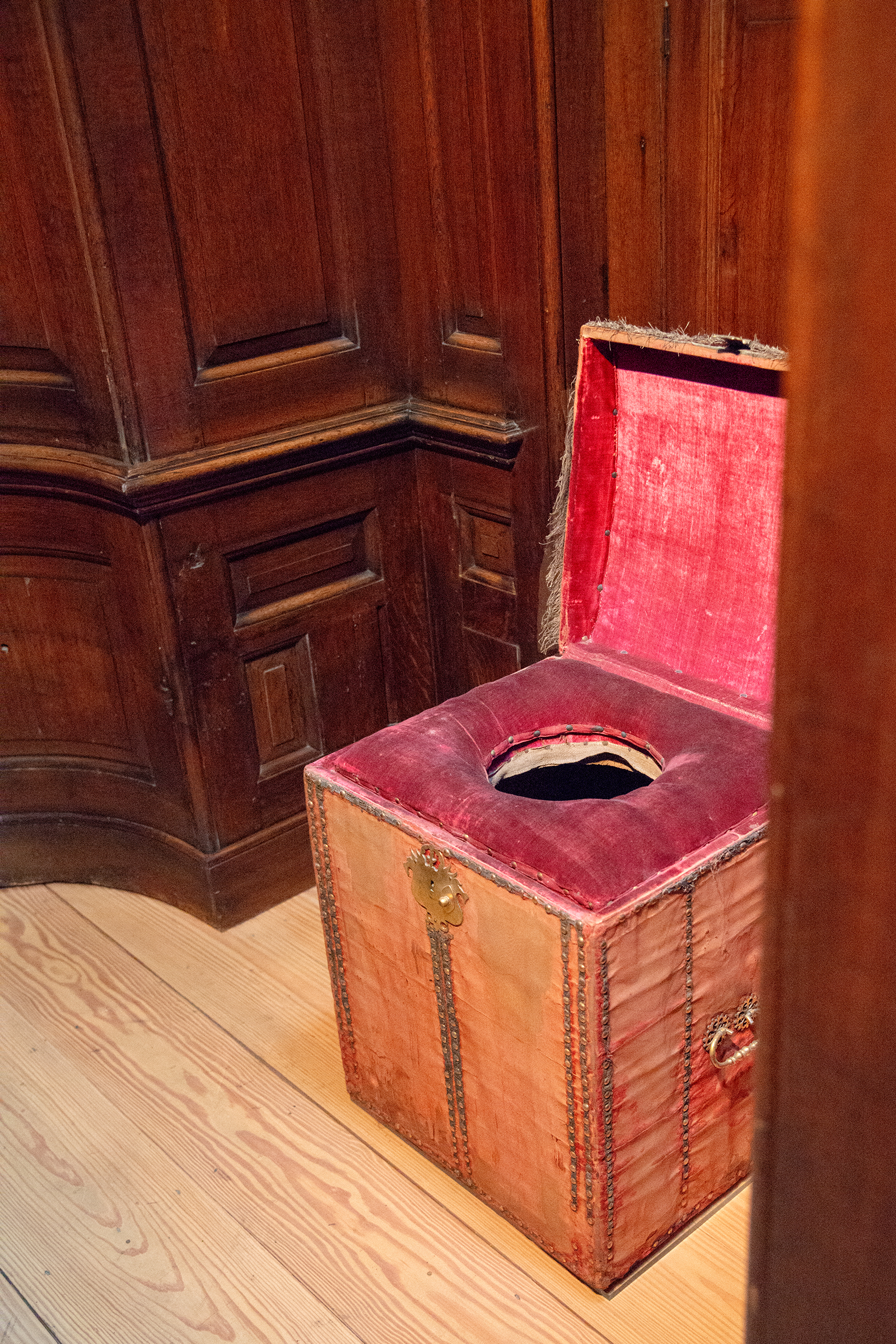
William III's close stool

== The Chapel ==
The timber and plaster ceiling of the chapel is considered the "most important and magnificent in Britain", but is all that remains of the Tudor decoration, after redecoration supervised by Sir Christopher Wren. The altar is framed by a massive but plain oak reredos with garlands carved by Grinling Gibbons during the reign of Queen Anne. Opposite the altar, at first-floor level, is the royal pew where the royal family would attend services apart from the general congregation seated below.

The clergy, musicians and other ecclesiastical officers employed by the monarch at Hampton Court, as in other English royal premises, are known collectively as the Chapel Royal; properly used the term does not refer to a building.

== Grounds ==
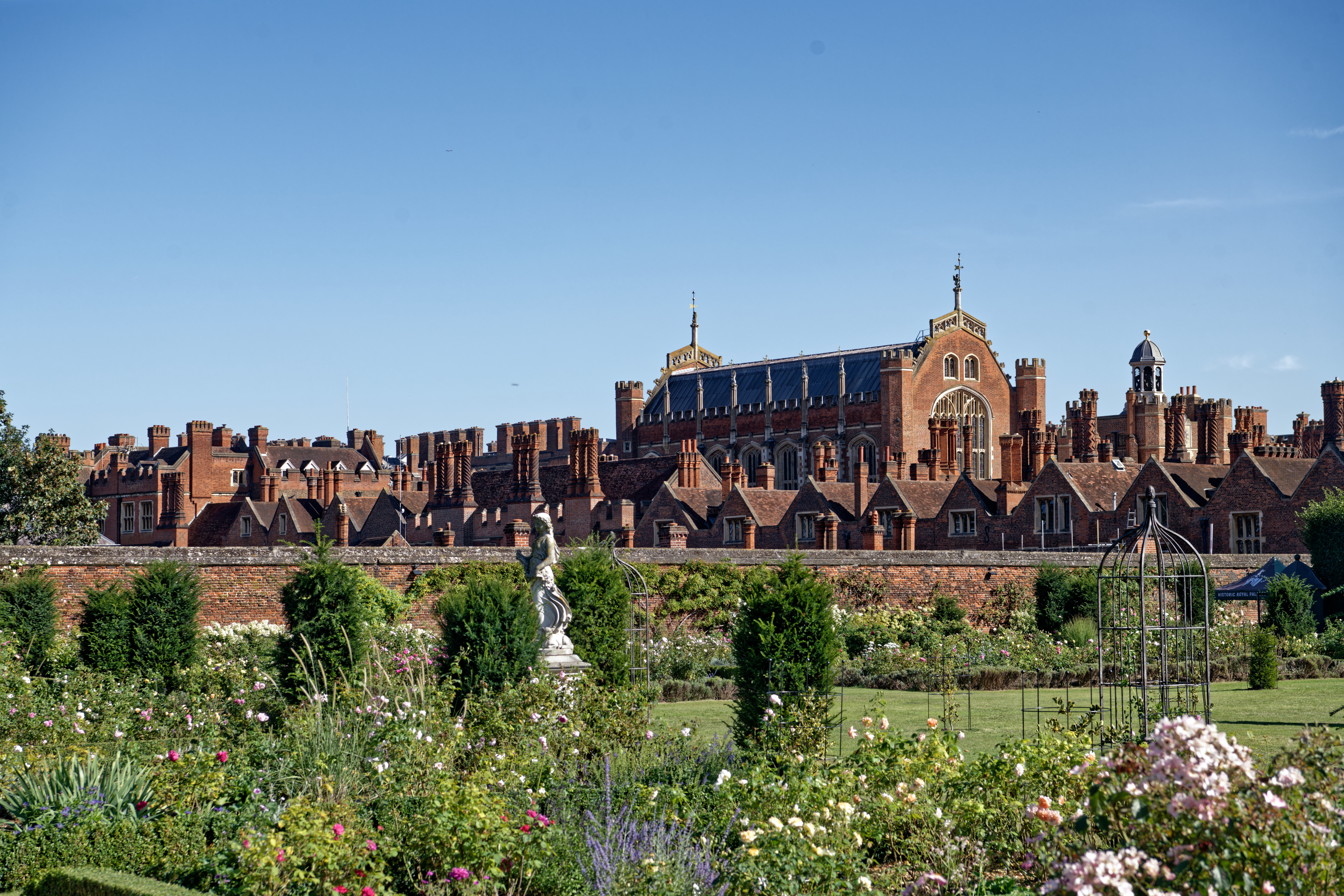
Hampton Court Palace, view from the flower garden

The grounds as they appear today were laid out in grand style in the late 17th century. There are no authentic remains of Henry VIII's gardens, merely a small knot garden, planted in 1924, which hints at the gardens' 16th-century appearance. Today, the dominating feature of the grounds is the great landscaping scheme constructed for Sir Christopher Wren's intended new palace. From a water-bounded semicircular parterre, the length of the east front, three avenues radiate in a crow's foot pattern. The central avenue, containing not a walk or a drive, but the great canal known as the Long Water, was excavated during the reign of Charles II, in 1662. The design, radical at the time, is another immediately recognizable influence from Versailles and was indeed laid out by pupils of André Le Nôtre, Louis XIV's landscape gardener.

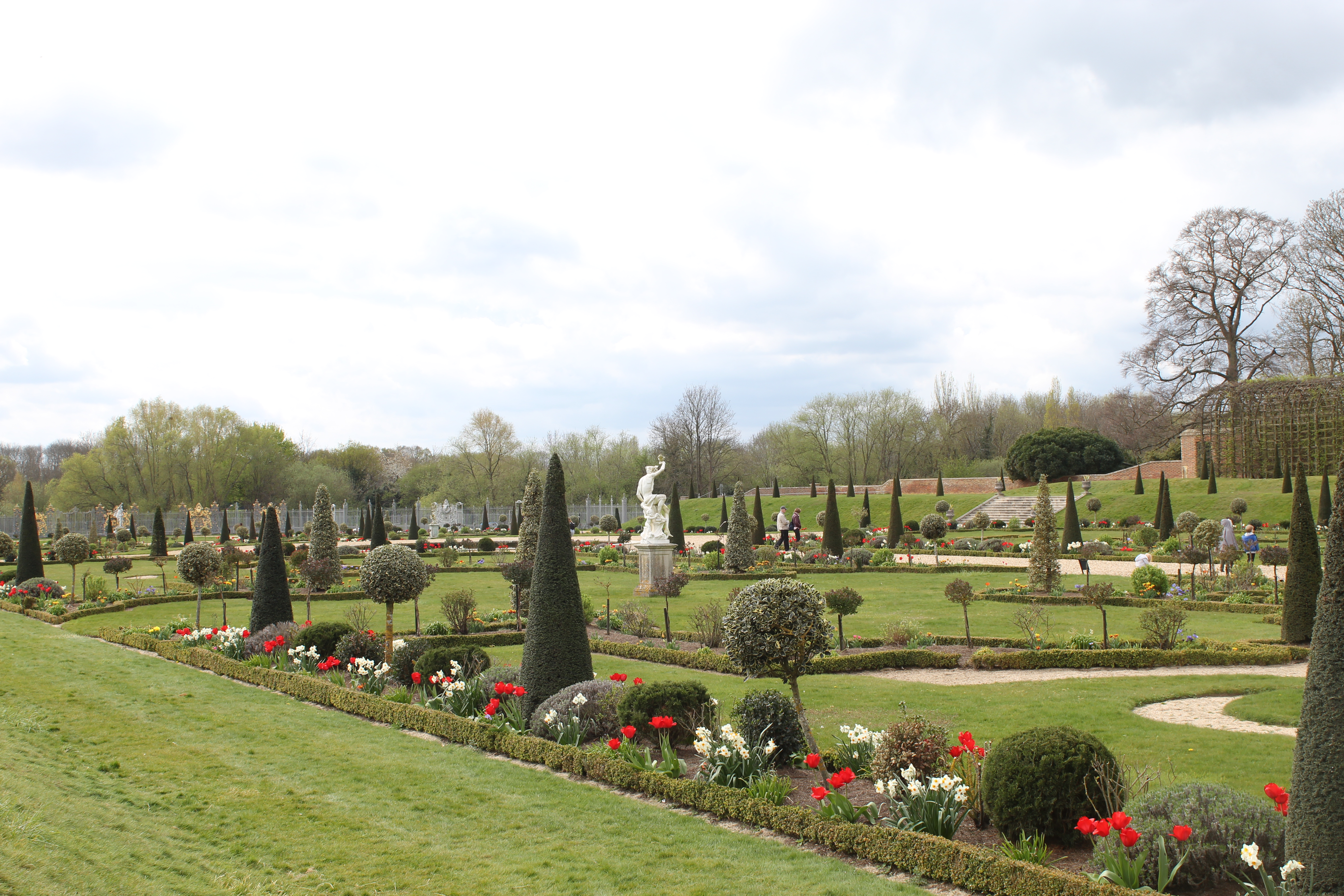
The Privy Garden

On the south side of the palace is the Privy Garden bounded by semi-circular wrought iron gates by Jean Tijou. This garden, originally William III's private garden, was replanted in 1992 in period style with manicured hollies and yews along a geometric system of paths.

On a raised site overlooking the Thames is a small pavilion, the Banqueting House. This was built c. 1700, for informal meals and entertainments in the gardens rather than for the larger state dinners which would have taken place inside the palace itself. A nearby conservatory houses the "Great Vine", planted in 1769; by 1968 it had a trunk 81 inches (2,100 mm) thick and has a length of 100 feet (30 m). It still produces an annual crop of grapes.

The palace included apartments for the use of favoured royal friends. One such apartment is described as being in "The Pavilion and situated on the Home Park" of Hampton Court Palace. This privilege was first extended about 1817 by Prince Edward, Duke of Kent and Strathearn, to his friend, Lieutenant General James Moore, and his new bride, Cecilia Watson. George IV continued this arrangement following the death of Prince Edward on 23 January 1820. Queen Victoria continued the arrangement for the widow of General Moore, following his death on 24 April 1838. This particular apartment was used for 21 years or more and spanned three different sponsors.

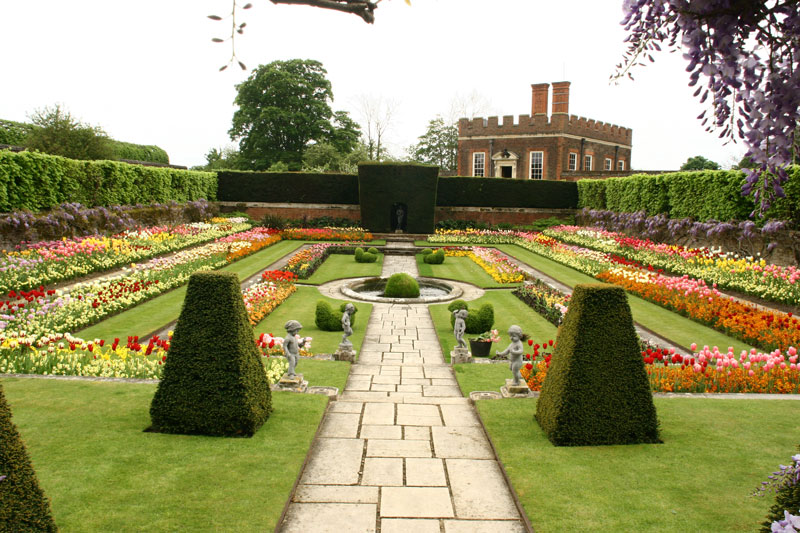
One of the palace's sunken gardens. In the background is William III's Banqueting House (H on plan) of 1700.

A well-known curiosity of the palace's grounds is Hampton Court Maze; planted in the 1690s by George London and Henry Wise for William III. It was originally planted with hornbeam; it has been repaired latterly using many different types of hedge. There is a 3D simulation of the maze, see the external links section.

Inspired by narrow views of a Tudor garden that can be seen through doorways in a painting, The Family of Henry VIII, hanging in the palace's Haunted Gallery, a new garden in the style of Henry VIII's 16th-century Privy Gardens, has been designed to celebrate the anniversary of that King's accession to the throne. Sited on the former Chapel Court Garden, it has been planted with flowers and herbs from the 16th century and is completed by gilded heraldic beasts and bold green and white painted fences. The garden's architect was Todd Longstaffe-Gowan.

The formal gardens and park are Grade I listed on the Register of Historic Parks and Gardens.

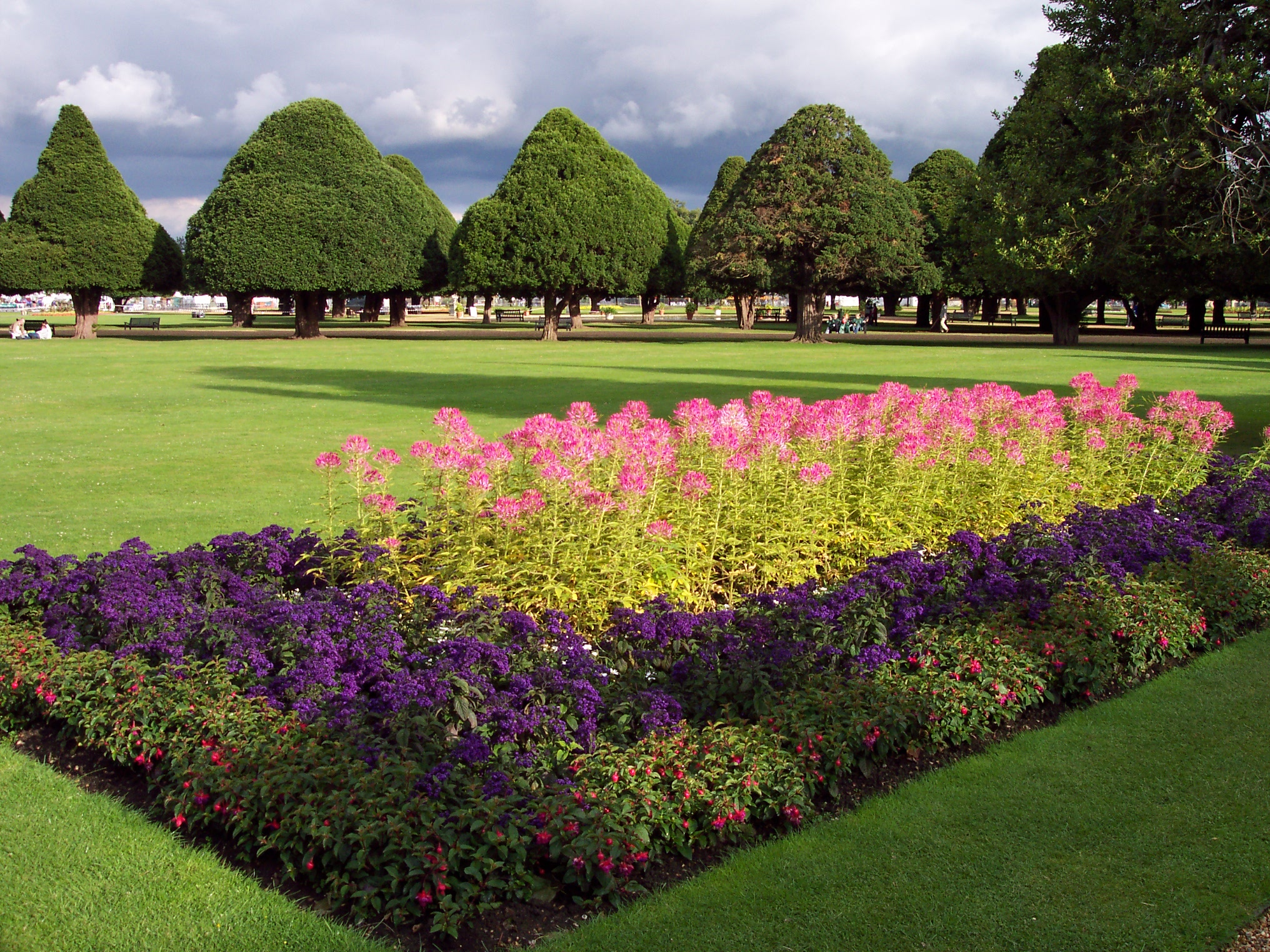
Flowers and trees in the Great Fountain Garden

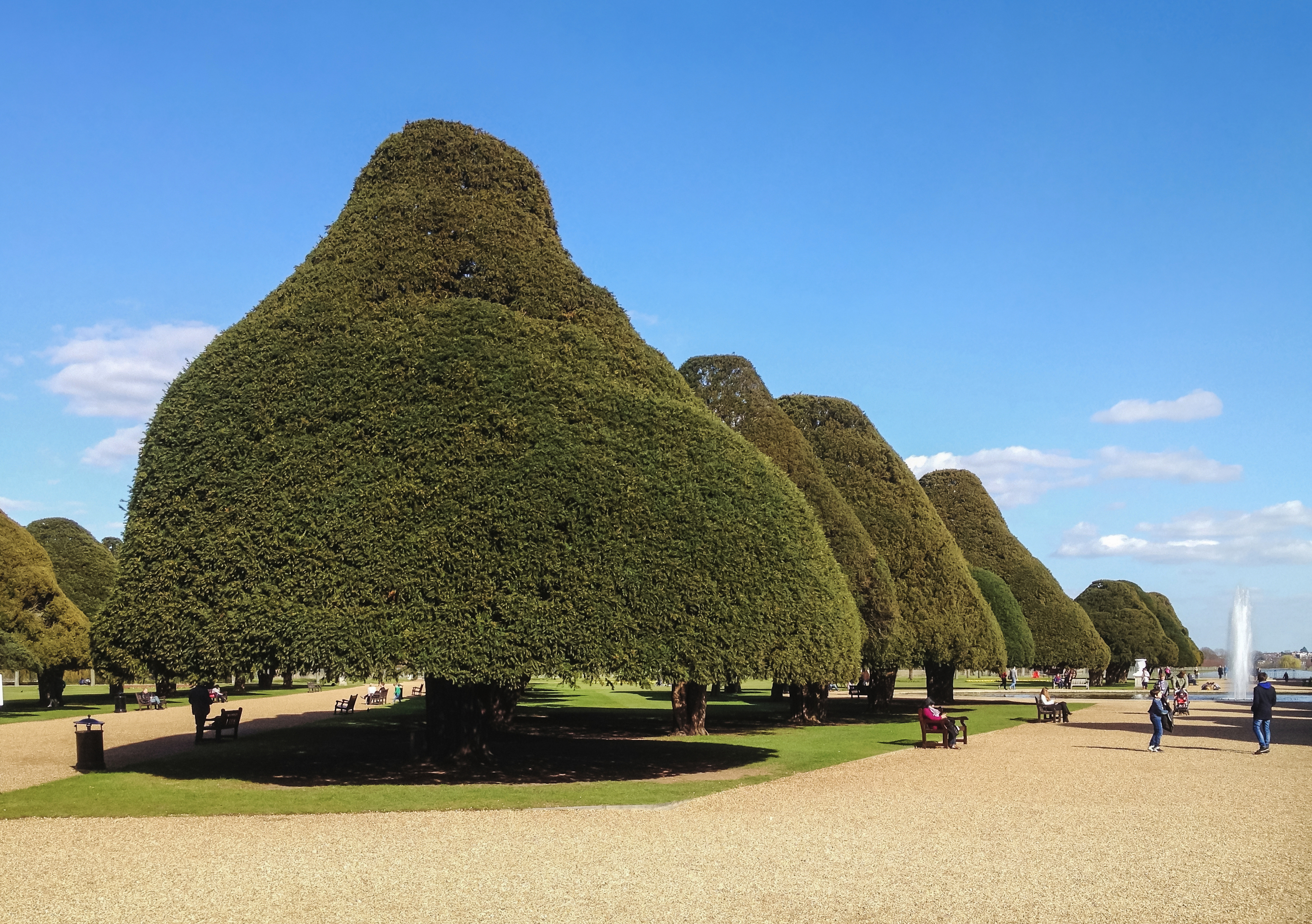
Shaped trees in the Great Fountain Garden

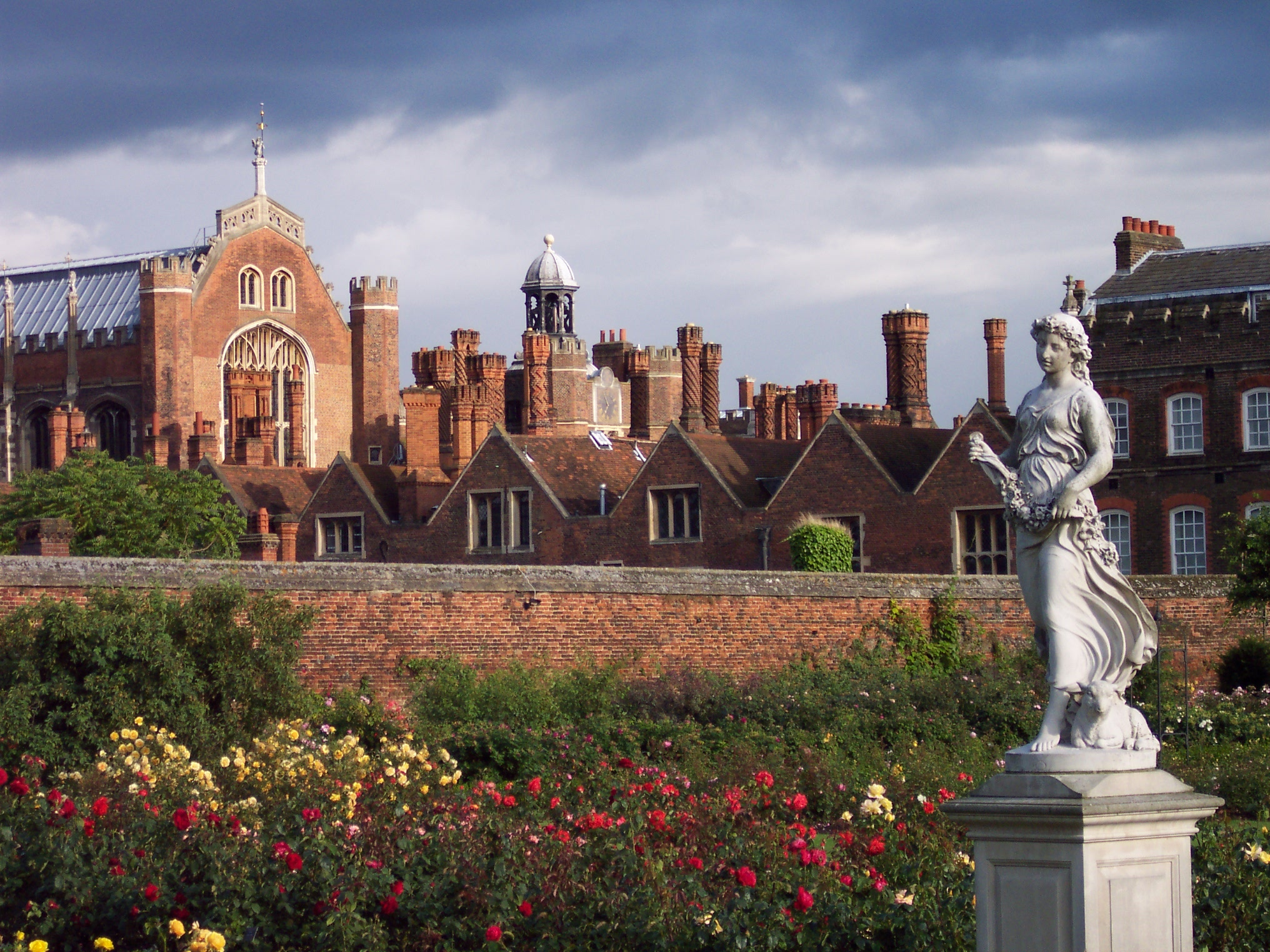
Rose garden of the Palace

=== King's Beasts ===
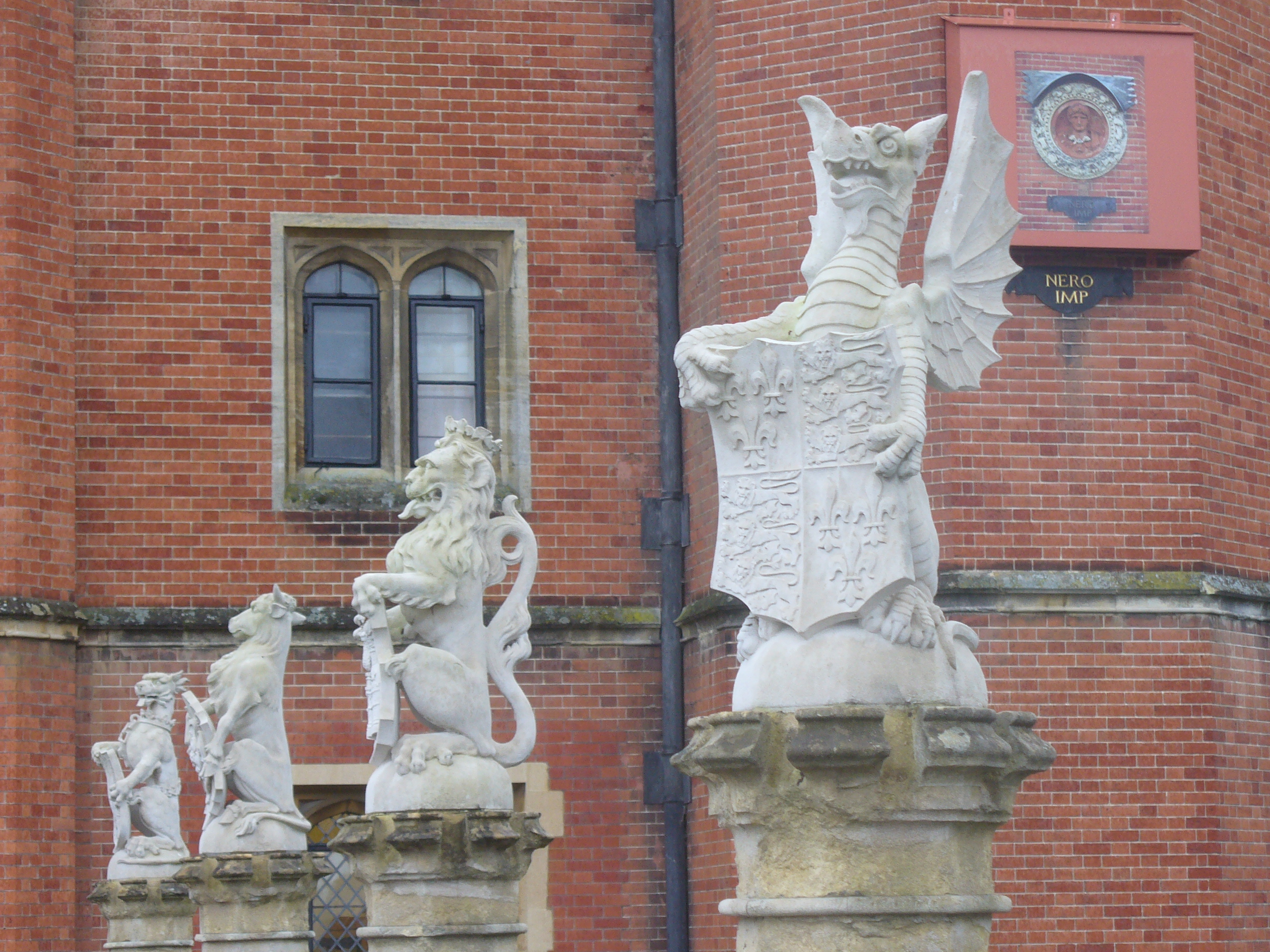
The King's Beasts, on the bridge before the Great Gatehouse

There are ten statues of heraldic animals, called the King's Beasts, that stand on the bridge over the moat leading to the great gatehouse. Unlike the Queen's Beasts in Kew Gardens, these statues represent the ancestry of King Henry VIII and his third wife Jane Seymour. The animals are: the lion of England, the Seymour lion, the royal dragon, the black bull of Clarence, the yale of Beaufort, the white lion of Mortimer, the White Greyhound of Richmond, the Tudor dragon, the Seymour panther, and the Seymour unicorn. The set of Queen's Beasts at the coronation of Queen Elizabeth II replaced the three Seymour items and one of the dragons by the gryphon of Edward III, the horse of Hanover, the falcon of the Plantagenets, and the unicorn of Scotland.

In 2009 to celebrate the 500th anniversary of the accession to the throne of King Henry VIII, a new "Tudor Garden" was created in Chapel Court, Hampton Court, designed by Todd Longstaffe-Gowan. To decorate the garden eight small wooden King's Beasts were carved and painted in bright colours, each sitting atop a 6-foot-high painted wooden column. The heraldic beasts, carved by Ben Harms and Ray Gonzalez of G&H Studios, include the golden lion of England, the white greyhound of Richmond, the red dragon of Wales, and the white hart of Richard II, all carved from English oak. The historically correct colours were researched by Patrick Baty, paint/colour consultant at Hampton Court. The beasts are of a different design to those on the bridge, based on period drawings in the College of Arms.

== Cultural appearances and influence ==
=== Florham, United States ===
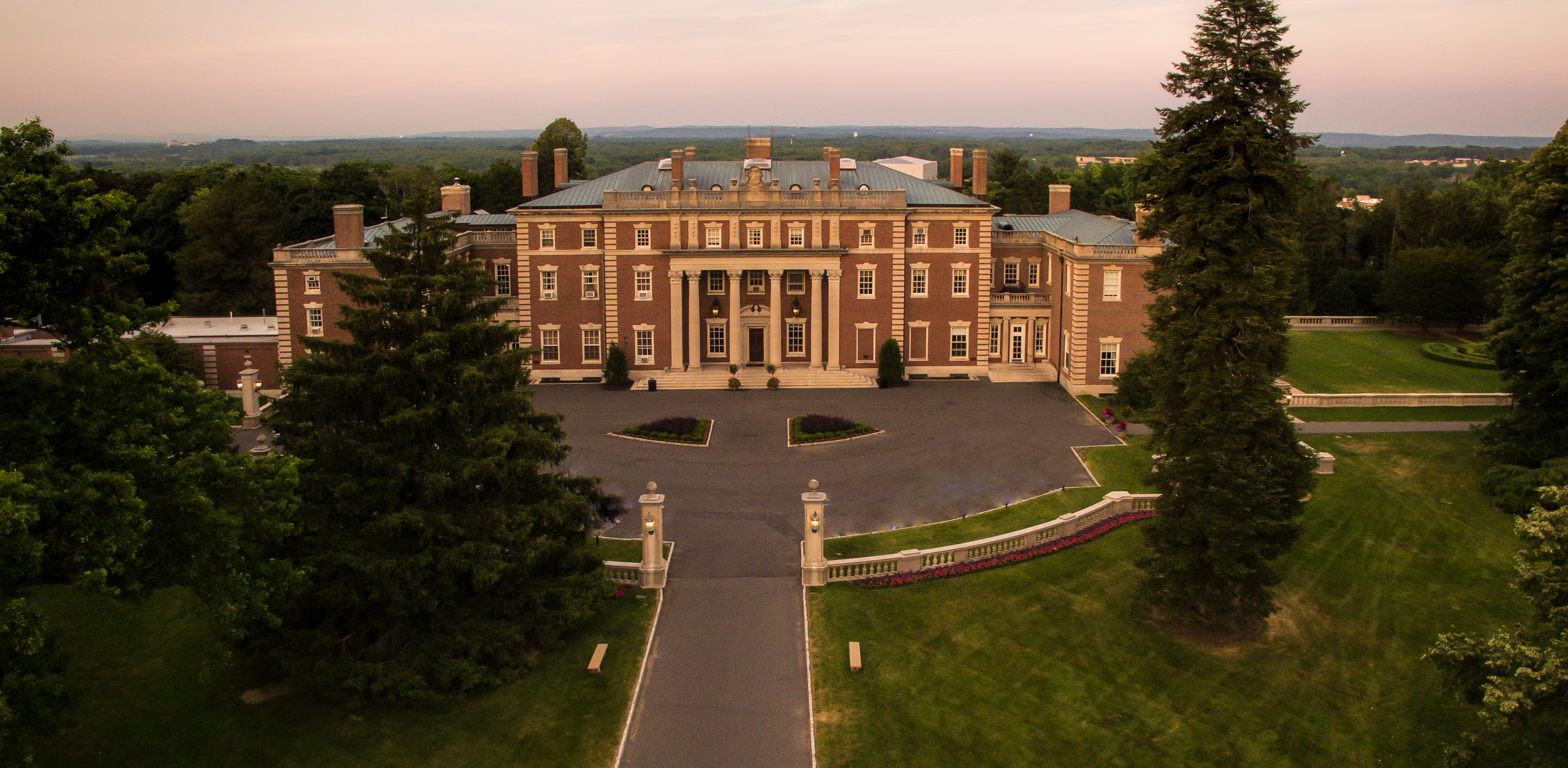
Wren's Hampton Court inspired Florham, a Vanderbilt family house in Madison, New Jersey.

Inspired by Wren's work at Hampton Court, the American Vanderbilt family modelled their estate known as Florham, in Madison, New Jersey, after it. Florham was commissioned by Florence Adele Vanderbilt Twombly and Hamilton McKown Twombly from McKim, Mead & White. It was built in 1893.

=== Film location ===
The palace has been used as a location for filming film and television shows, including The Private Life of Henry VIII, Three Men In A Boat, A Man For All Seasons, Vanity Fair, Little Dorrit, John Adams (2008), The Young Victoria, Pirates of the Caribbean: On Stranger Tides, Sherlock Holmes: A Game of Shadows, The Theory of Everything, Cinderella, Mamma Mia: Here We Go Again!, The Favourite, Belgravia, The Great, Bridgerton, and Taskmaster. Some scenes of the spin-off series, Queen Charlotte: A Bridgerton Story, were also filmed at the palace, as was the King's staircase in The Sandman and Renegade Nell.

=== Poetry ===
Lydia Sigourney's poem Hampton Court records a visit to the palace with the bridal party following a wedding in March 1841. It was published in her Pleasant Memories of Pleasant Lands in 1842.

== See also ==
- Coughton Court in Warwickshire
- Het Loo Palace in the Netherlands
- List of works of art at Hampton Court Palace
- Treaty of Hampton Court (1562), also known as the Treaty of Richmond, signed on 22 September 1562 between Queen Elizabeth and Huguenot leader Louis I, Prince of Condé
- Hampton Court ghost

== General and cited references ==
- Dynes, Wayne (1968). Palaces of Europe. London: Hamlyn. OCLC 37658.
- Copplestone, Trewin (1963). World Architecture. London: Hamlyn.
- Summerson, John (1969). Great Palaces (Hampton Court. pp. 12–23). London: Hamlyn Publishing Group Ltd. ISBN 0-600-01682-X.
- Thurley, Simon (1996). Hampton Court Palace. London: Historic Royal Palaces.
- Williams, Neville (1971). Royal Homes. Lutterworth Press. ISBN 0-7188-0803-7.
