= Hampton Court ghost =

2003 image in CCTV footage

Hampton Court ghost refers to a figure seen in a CCTV footage/image near Hampton Court Palace in October 2003. The figure was seen in a long robe-like cloth allegedly haunting the place for a couple of days or months.

The figure was first reported in early-2001. A similar incident happened in 2015 but was later debunked.

== See also ==
- Solway Firth Spaceman
