= John Pelletier =

French Huguenot carver and gilder

John (Jean) Pelletier (fl. ca 1681 – 1704) was a French Huguenot carver and gilder, who emigrated from Paris, where he had trained, and worked in London. He provided high-style Baroque furniture for the court of William III and Mary II, specializing in carved, gessoed and gilded furniture of the highest quality. He was also employed in providing carved and gilded picture and looking-glass frames and in gilding the work of other carvers.

After John Pelletier's death in 1704, his sons René and Thomas continued the workshop until they split in 1711, René pursuing a second career as a mounter of drawings, and Thomas, who was appointed cabinetmaker in ordinary to Queen Anne in 1704, as an auctioneer. Tessa Murdoch suggests, from Jean Pelletier's shaky handwriting in 1702, that he was already working in a supervisory capacity at that date.

== Career ==
With his wife and their son, René and infant son Thomas (born 1680), Jean Pelletier emigrated from France in the period of increasing intolerance that led up to the Revocation of the Edict of Nantes, 1685. By December 1681 he was briefly in Amsterdam, where he became a member of the Huguenot church; the following 8 March he applied for denization in London, giving him legal status as an English subject. His son René followed him in 1688.

Pelletier's name first appears in the English Lord Chamberlain's accounts in 1690; during William III's reign he supplied the Crown with carved and gilded table frames, stands, screens and mirrors. Two sets of candlestands at Hampton Court Palace are attributed to him on the evidence of his accounts in 1699/1700 and 1701:

1699/1700 For carving and guilding [sic] six pairs of large stands at £30 per pair— £180.
1701 For carving and guilding two pairs of large stands— £70

A firescreen en suite is securely attributed to Pelletier. A pair of carved and gilded candlestands in the same style are in the collection at Temple Newsam, Leeds. The pairs of tall torchères, intended to flank pier tables owe their inspiration to the solid silver furniture of Louis XIV's Hall of Mirrors at Versailles.

Pelletier supplied over £600 worth of furnishings for the State Apartments at Hampton Court Palace, 1699–1702. Three pairs of carved and gilded side tables at Windsor Castle, long attributed to the royal cabinetmaker Benjamin Goodison and dated circa 1730 have been re-attributed to Pelletier, 1699, by Tessa Murdoch, who noted their similarity to contemporary cabinet stands at Versailles engraved by Pierre Lepautre.

John Pelletier's name also appears in the accounts of Ralph Montagu, 1st Duke of Montagu, William III's Master of the Great Wardrobe for supplying carved and gilded frames for Montagu House, Bloomsbury, London, from 1698 to his death in 1704. Montagu had served as Charles II's ambassador to the court of Louis XIV, and his own taste was distinctly French Baroque.
