= Denis Alva Parsons =

English sculptor and carver

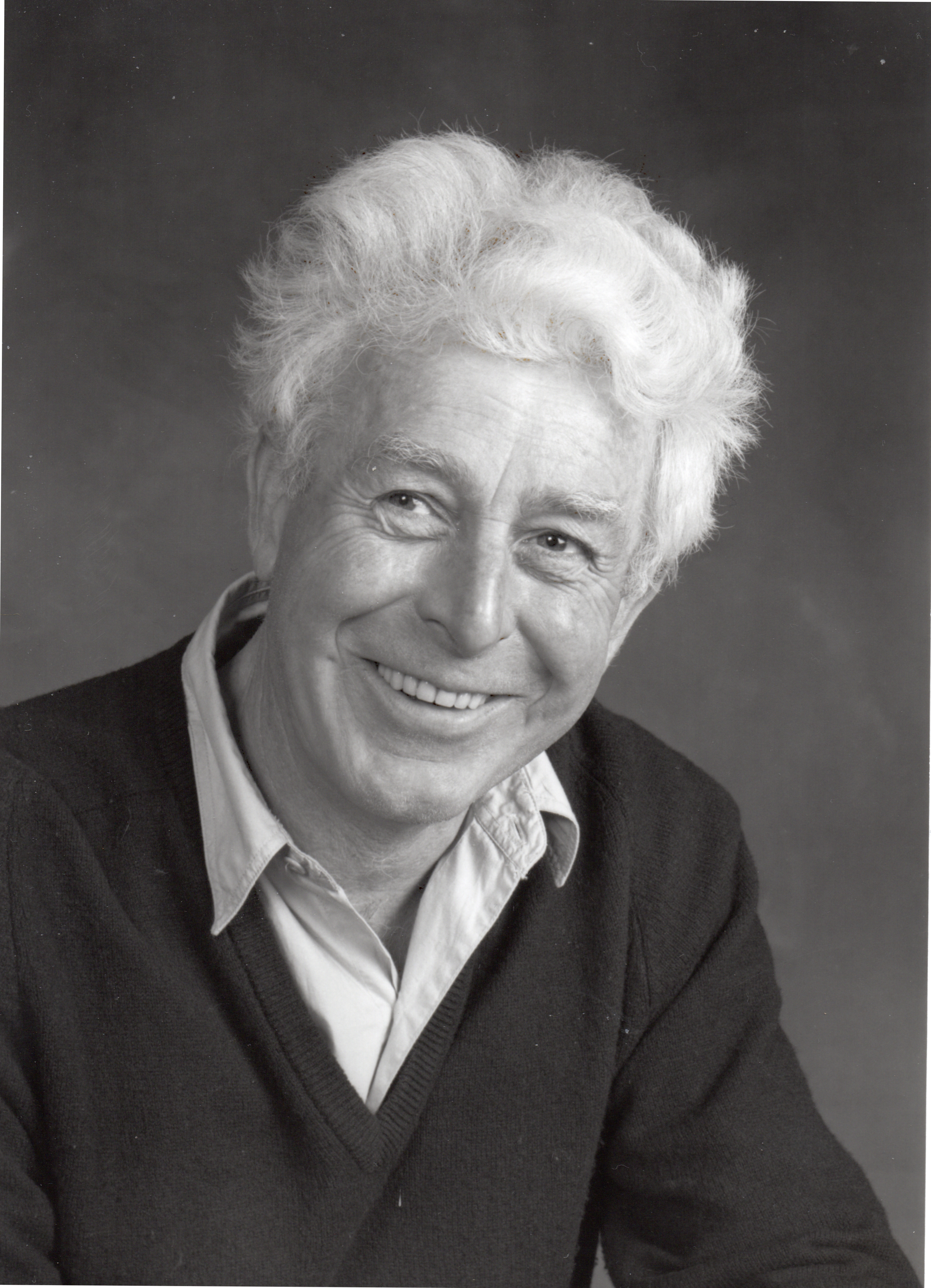
- Denis Alva Parsons
- Born: 14 November 1934; Polesworth, Warwickshire, UK
- Died: 4 April 2012 (aged 77); Sutton Coldfield, West Midlands, UK
- Education: Seven year apprenticeship, Robert Bridgeman & Sons, Lichfield, UK
- Known for: Sculpture, carving, letter cutting, gilding
- Awards: MBE (Member of the Most Excellent Order of the British Empire), ARBS (Associate of the Royal British Society of Sculptors, Membership Number 161)

Denis Alva Parsons, MBE, ARBS (14 November 1934 – 4 April 2012), was an English sculptor and carver in wood and stone, working in the tradition of "direct carving" technique and figurative bronzes.

== Career ==
Parsons was a sculptor, one of the last traditionally schooled craftsmen in a long British carving tradition. He was accomplished in "direct carving" – cutting figures out of a block of stone or wood. This was seen as a primary test of the artist's abilities in releasing the figures "hidden" in the inert materials.

Born near Polesworth, Warwickshire, Parsons spent his whole working career in the Midlands. In the 1950s, he served a seven-year apprenticeship with Robert Bridgeman and Sons, Lichfield, later to become Linford Bridgeman a company concentrating on architectural and ecclesiastical carving and sculpture. At the time, the company employed a substantial team of carvers, each with a specialist skill in figurative sculpture, foliage carving and letter cutting. From each craftsman, Parsons was fortunate to acquire traditional skills that had been developed and handed down over many generations. Later he became the company's head sculptor before setting up his own studio near Lichfield.

In a career lasting over fifty years, Denis Parsons established a reputation in the field of wood and stone carving, both figurative and architectural. A range of his figurative work can be found in locations worldwide. St Joseph's R.C. Church at Darlaston, Wednesbury, West Midlands, features four of his figures. The Samuel Johnson Birthplace Museum in Lichfield, Staffordshire, exhibits a figure of Dr Johnson in the round created by Parsons. St Ambrose R.C. Church, Kidderminster displays Parsons' interpretation of St Ambrose in lime wood. The crypt chapel at St Marylebone Parish Church in London, contains a crucifix by Parsons. His work is to be found in many of the great buildings across the UK – including St Paul's Cathedral, the Houses of Parliament, Westminster Abbey where Parsons was responsible for the restoration/replacement of eight large figures and decorative stonework on the north transept. He worked on major conservation projects for the National Trust including Little Moreton Hall, which is featured in The Building Conservation Directory of 1994.

Parsons demonstrated carving on behalf of The Royal Fine Art Commission (now known as the Commission for Architecture and the Built Environment) at the Royal Academy in July 1989 in the presence of Princess Margaret and an exhibition titled "On the Side of the Angels" at the commission's head office in St James's Square, London, in March 1992 in the presence of The Queen and the Duke of Edinburgh representing Linford Bridgeman, Lichfield.

In 1992, he was elected an Associate of the Royal British Society of Sculptors, as member 161.

In 1993, he was awarded the MBE in recognition of his services to conservation. In 2013, The Denis Parsons Foundation was created under the auspices of The City of Lichfield Worshipful Company of Smiths to provide funds to assist local apprentices in practical skills. A tribute to Parsons was published in the Lichfield Gazette in June 2013 and again shortly afterwards when they featured the establishment of the Denis Parsons Foundation.

Parsons contributed an article to Practical Woodworking magazine in 1992. Parsons has been featured in many publications, including Public Sculpture of Staffordshire and the Black Country. Parsons talks to Marion Hancock about his career in The Architects' Journal. Parsons is featured in Country Life Magazine, where he was referred to as "one of the country's most expert architectural sculptors".

== Gallery ==
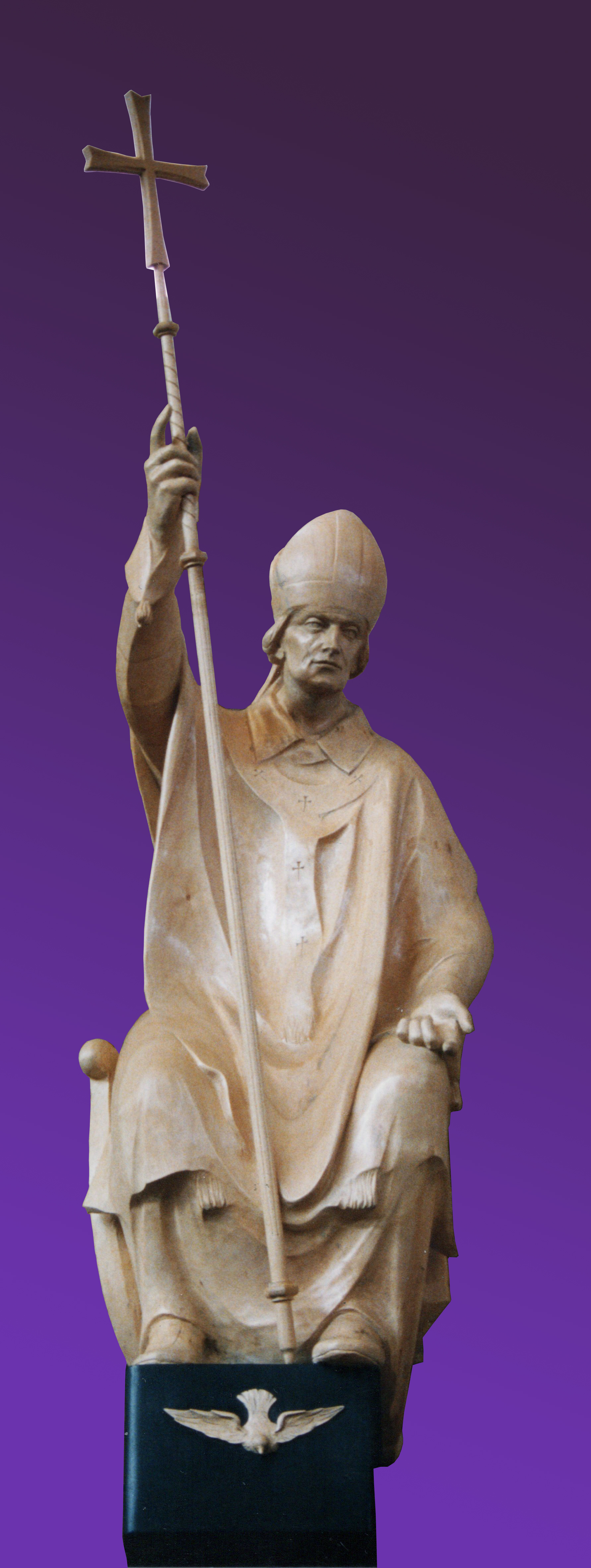
St Dunston
Lime wood
St Dunstans RC Church, Kings Heath, Birmingham

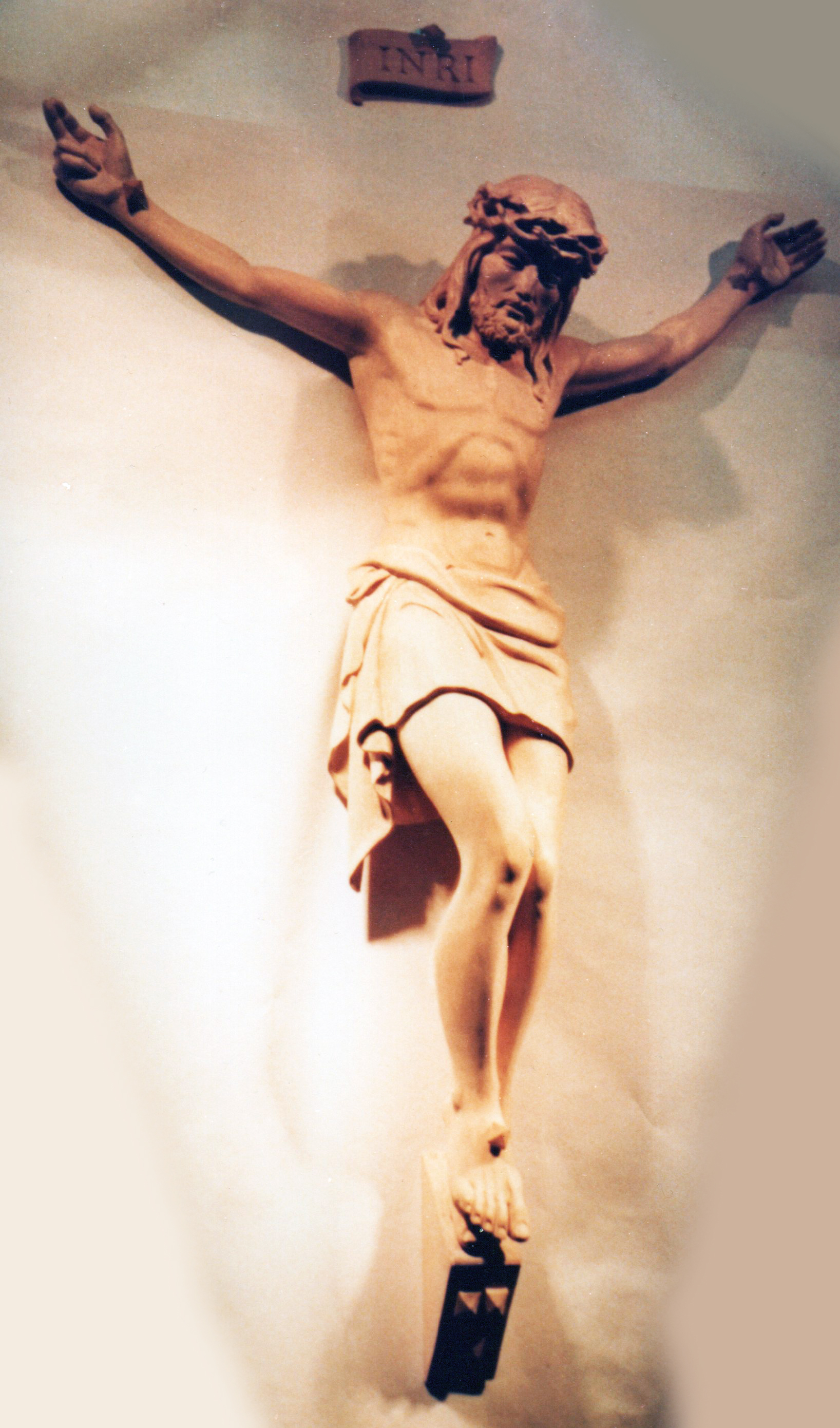
Crucifix
Ash
Crypt Chapel, St Marylebone Parish Church, London

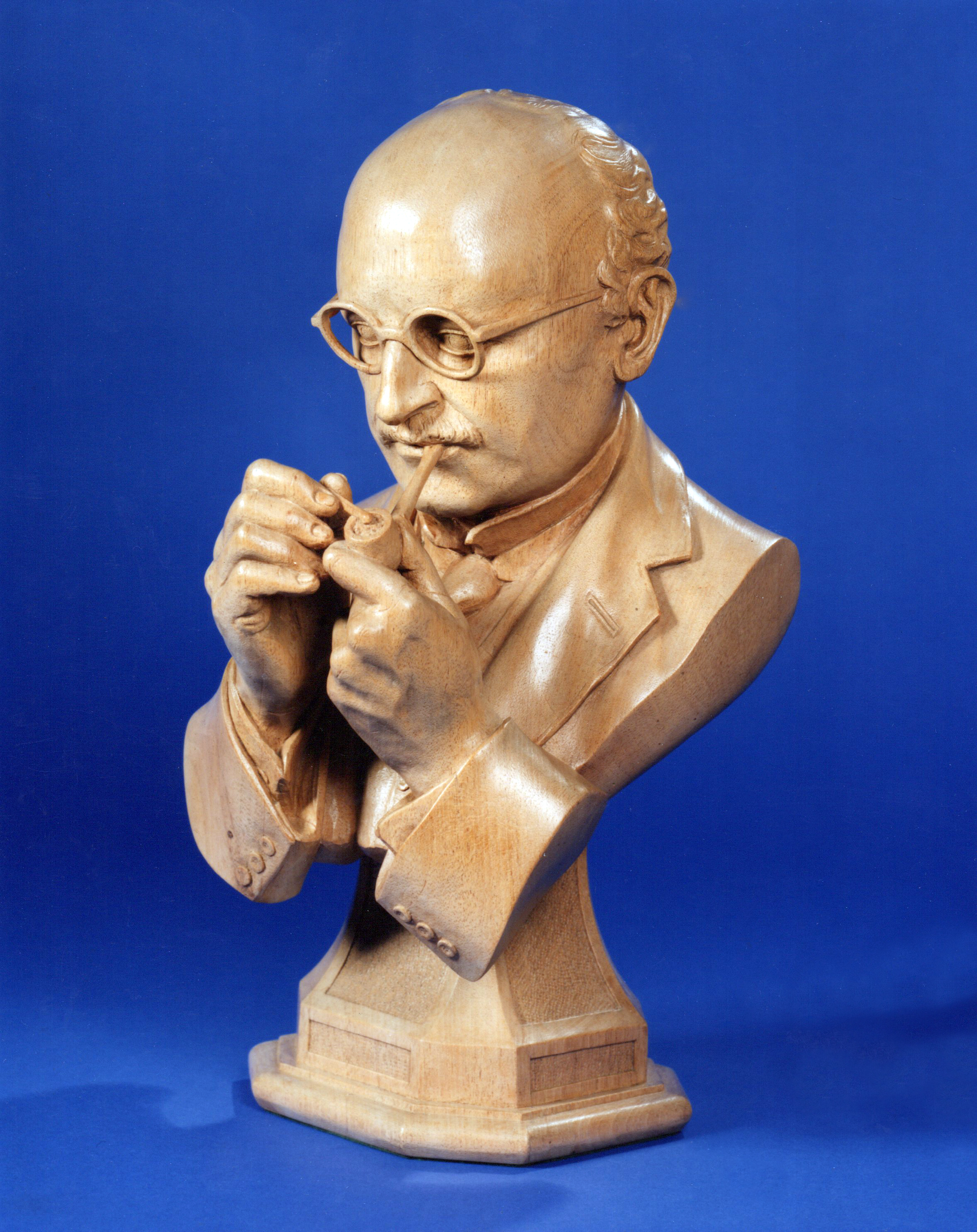
Sir Edwin Landseer Lutyens
Bleached Brazilian mahogany
Private collection

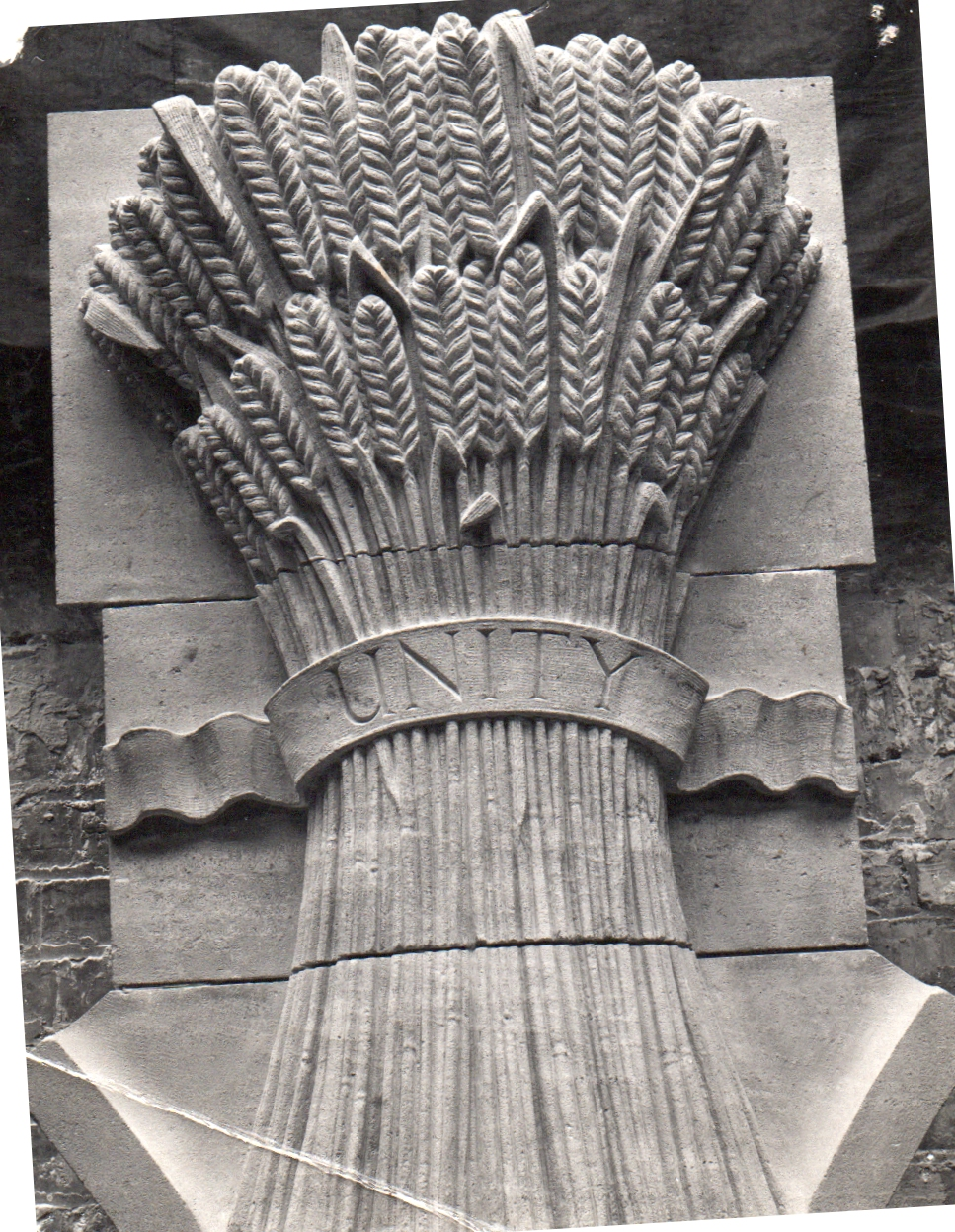
NFU Logo
Clipsham Stone
Entrance foyer of the new head office, Tiddington, Stratford-upon-Avon

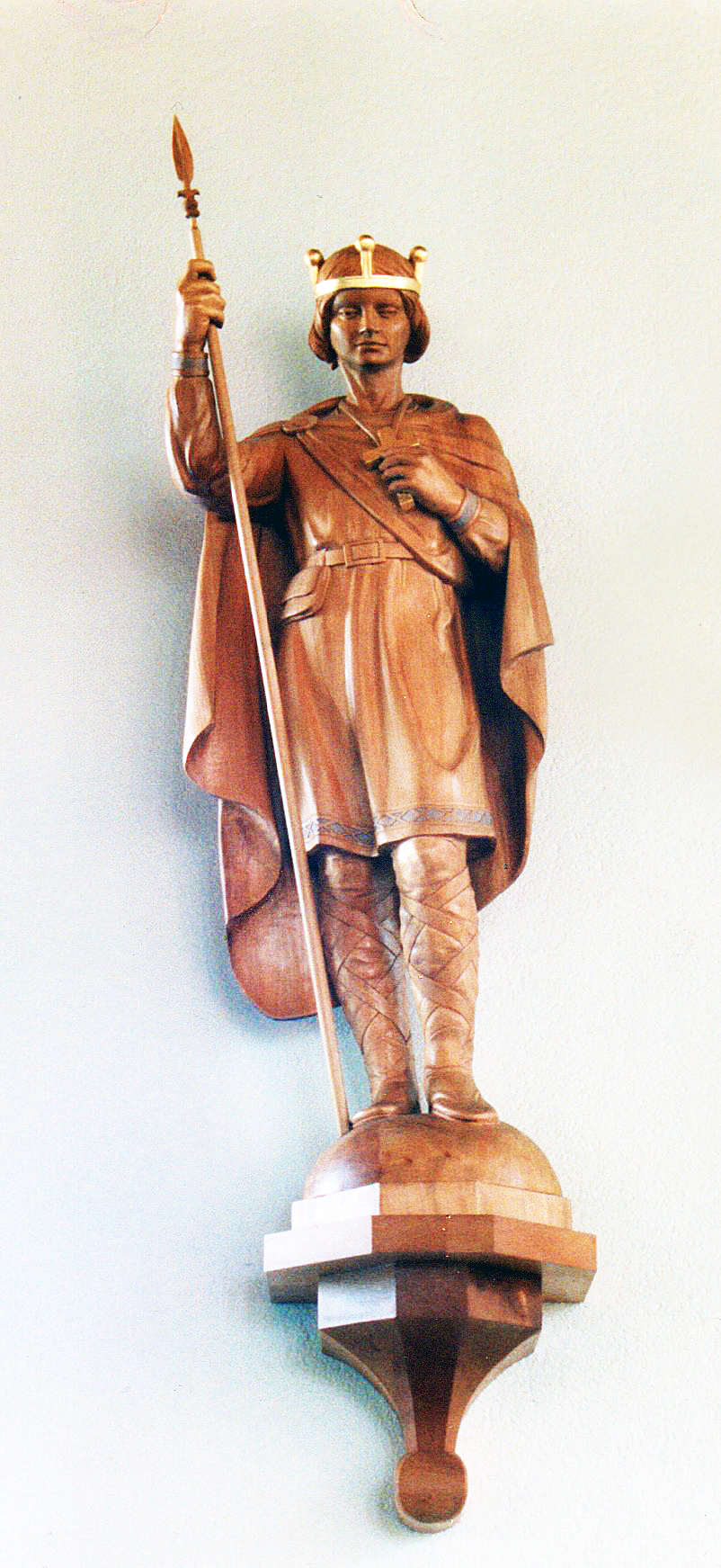
St Kenelm
Lime Wood
Our Lady and St Kenelm RC Church, Halesowen, West Midlands

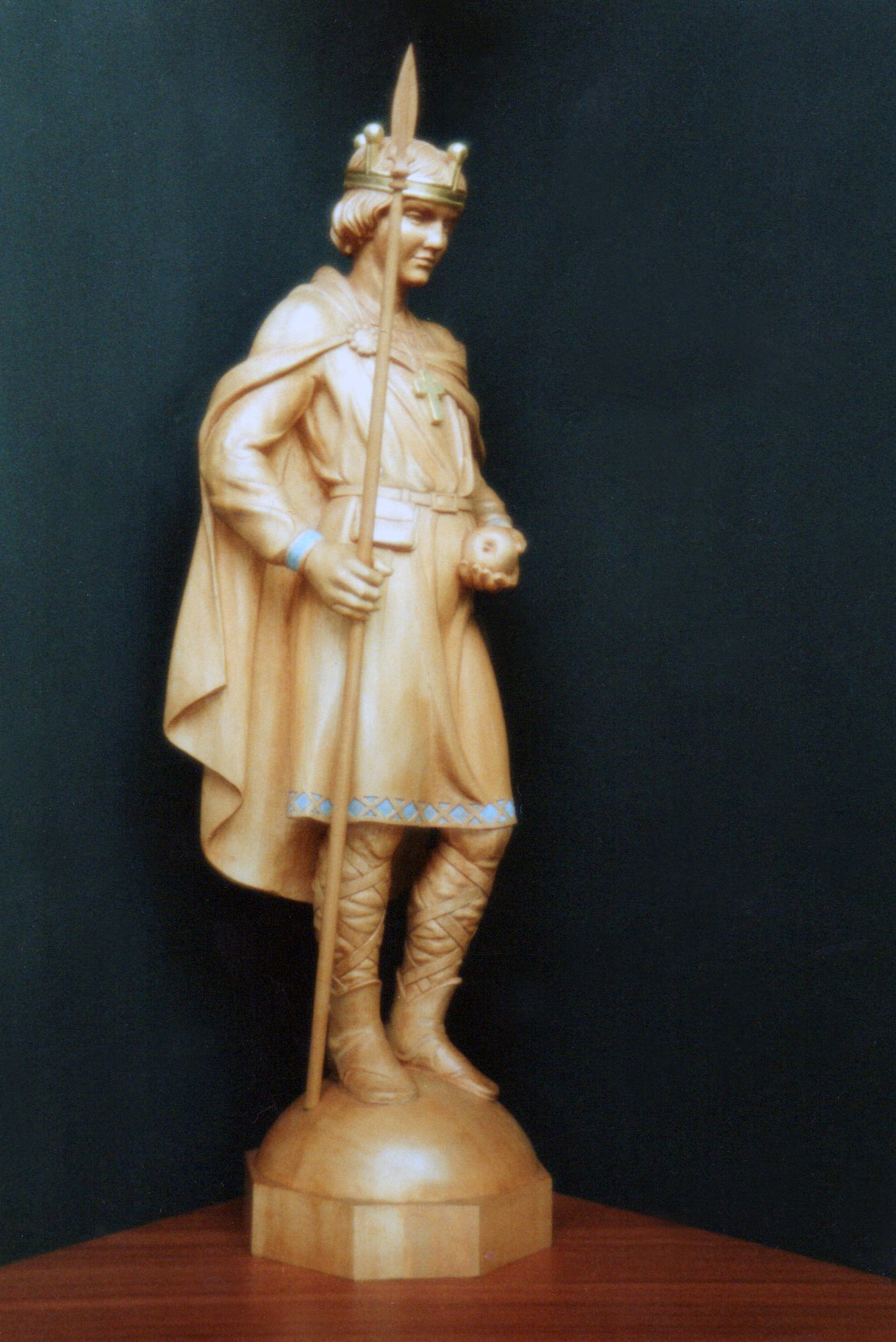
St Kenelm
Lime Wood
Our Lady and St Kenelm RC School, Halesowen, West Midlands

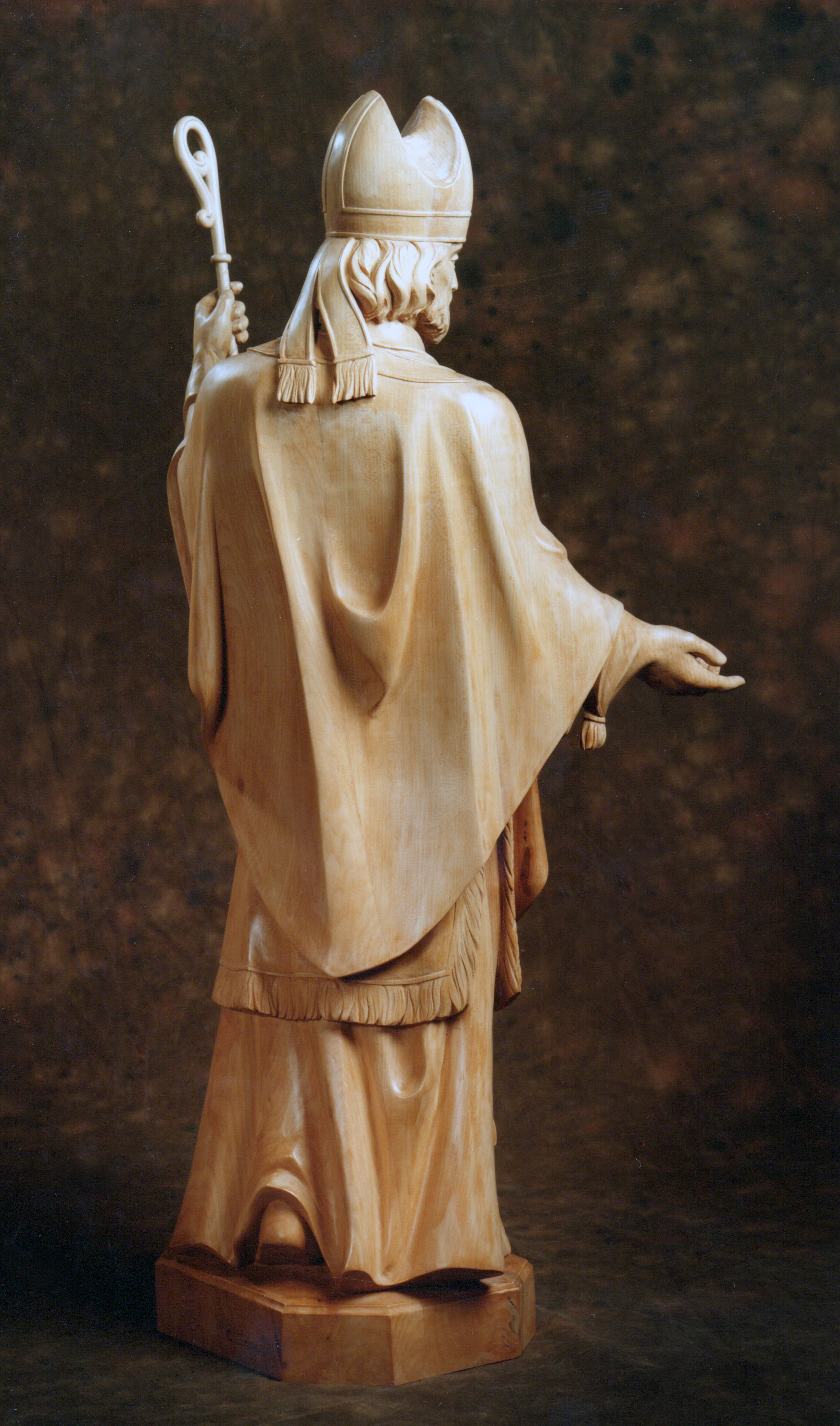
St Ambrose – rear view
Lime wood
St Ambrose RC Church, Kidderminster

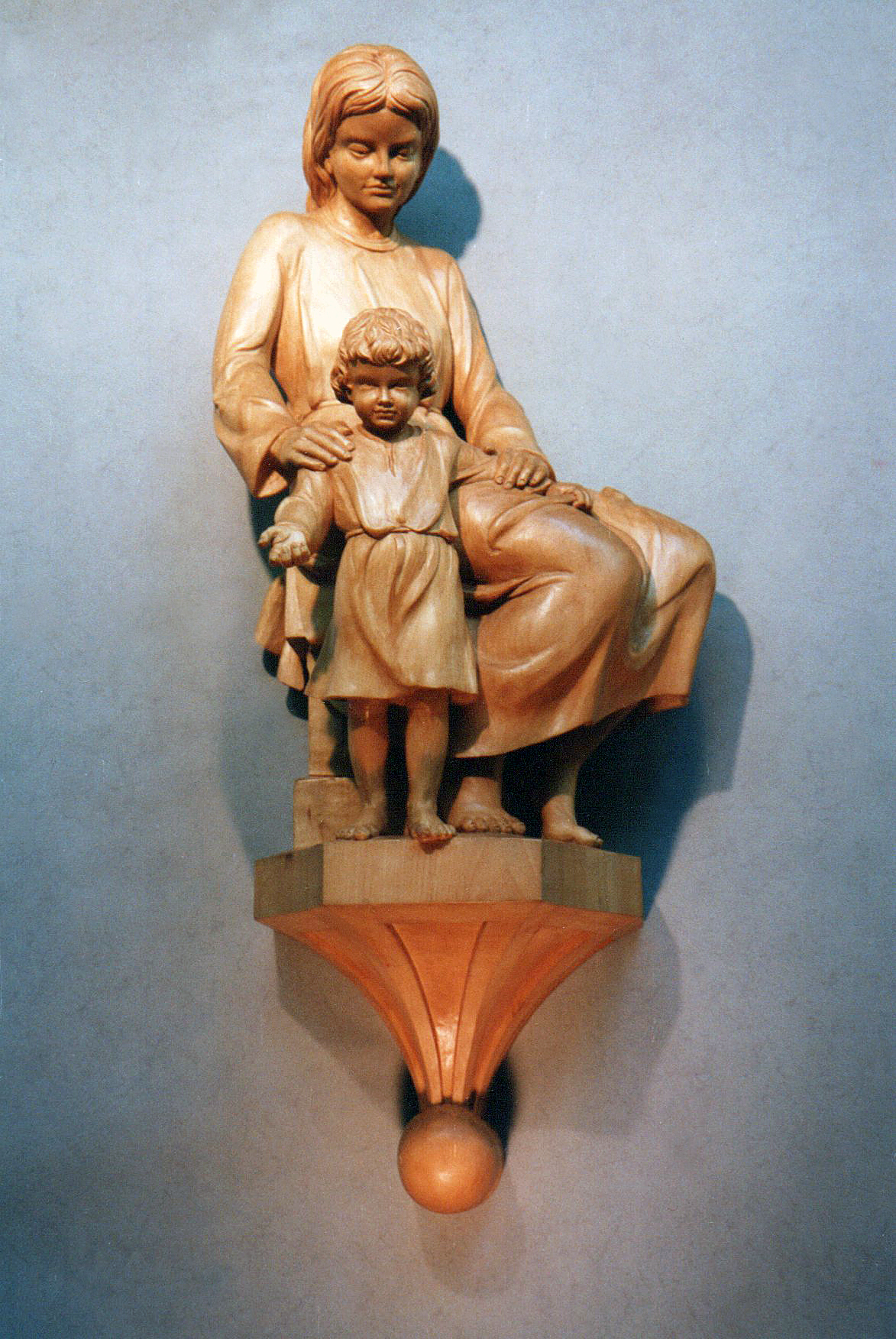
St Mary and Child Christ
Lime wood
St Mary's Hospital Chapel, London

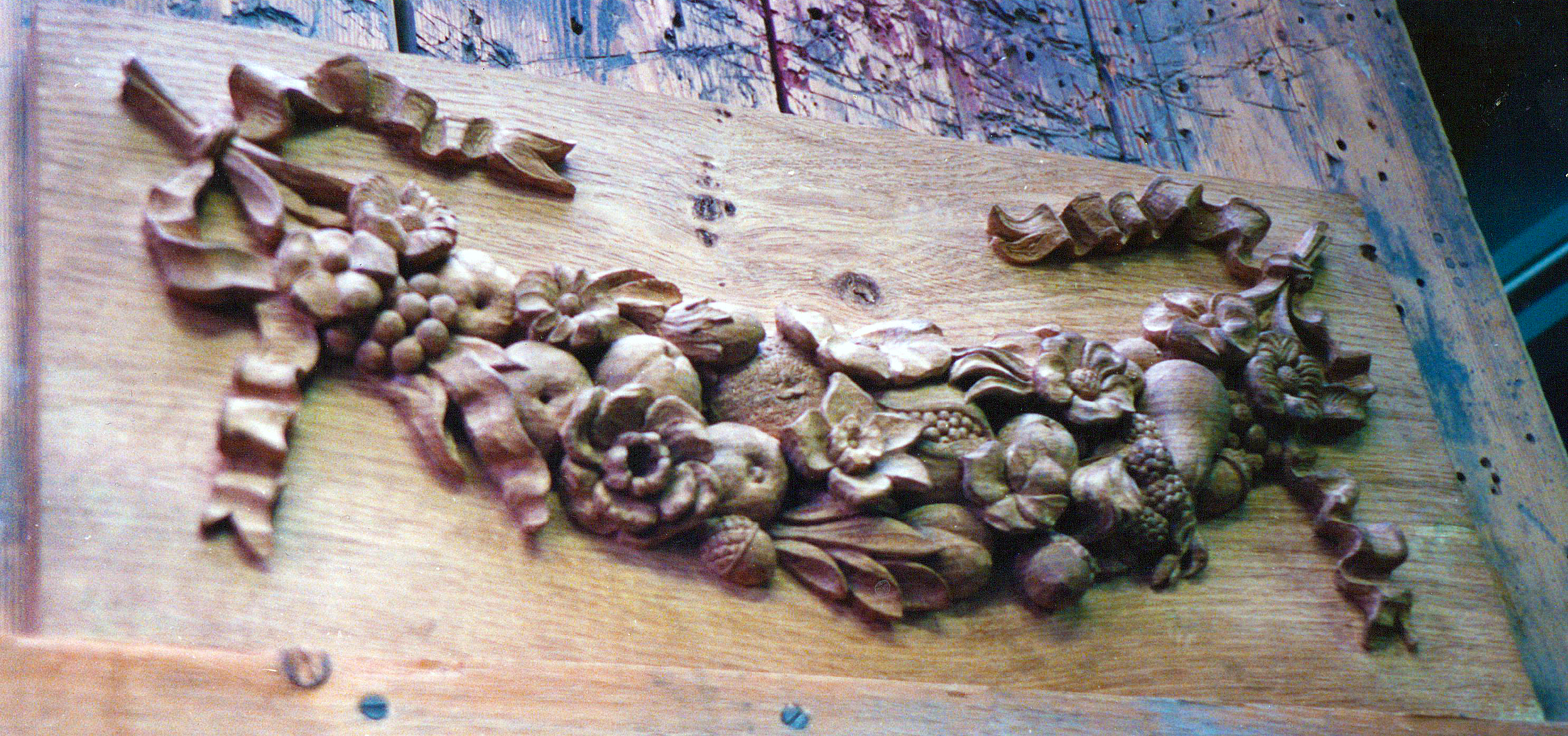
Decorative carving
Oak
Location unknown

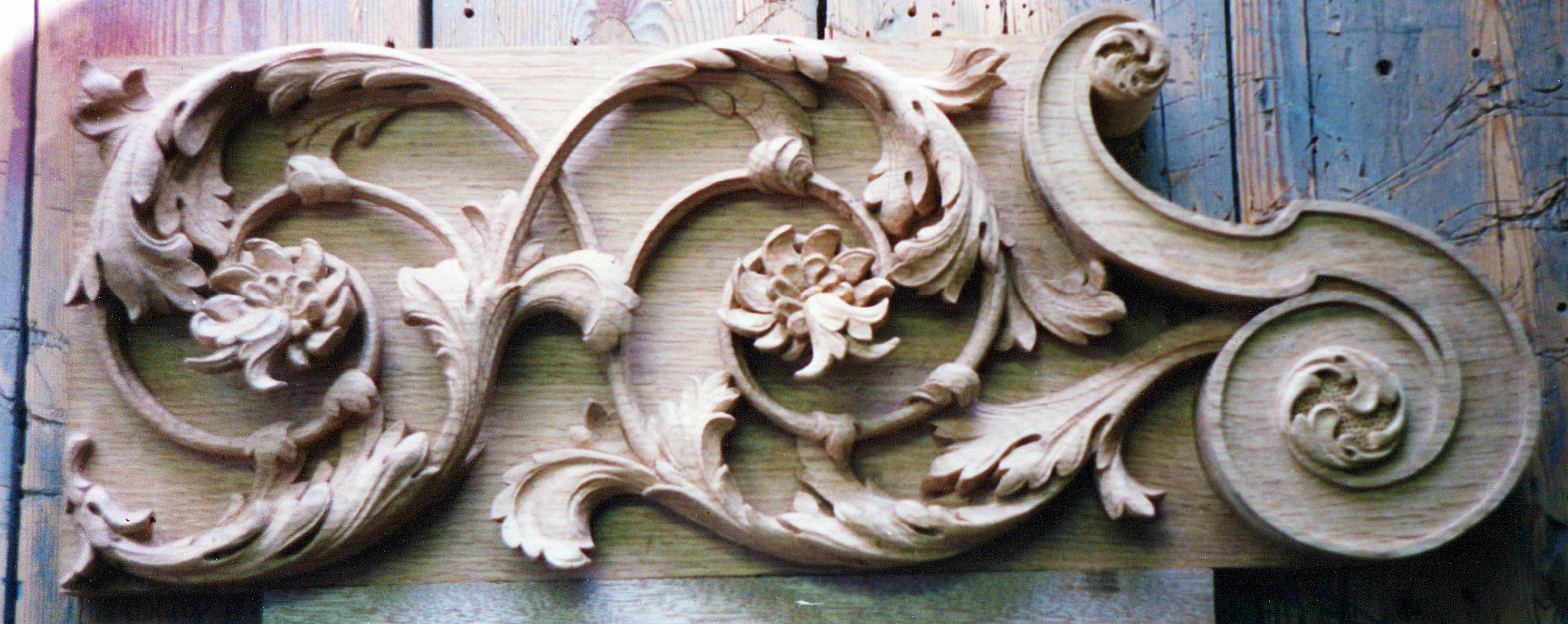
Decorative carving
Oak
Location unknown

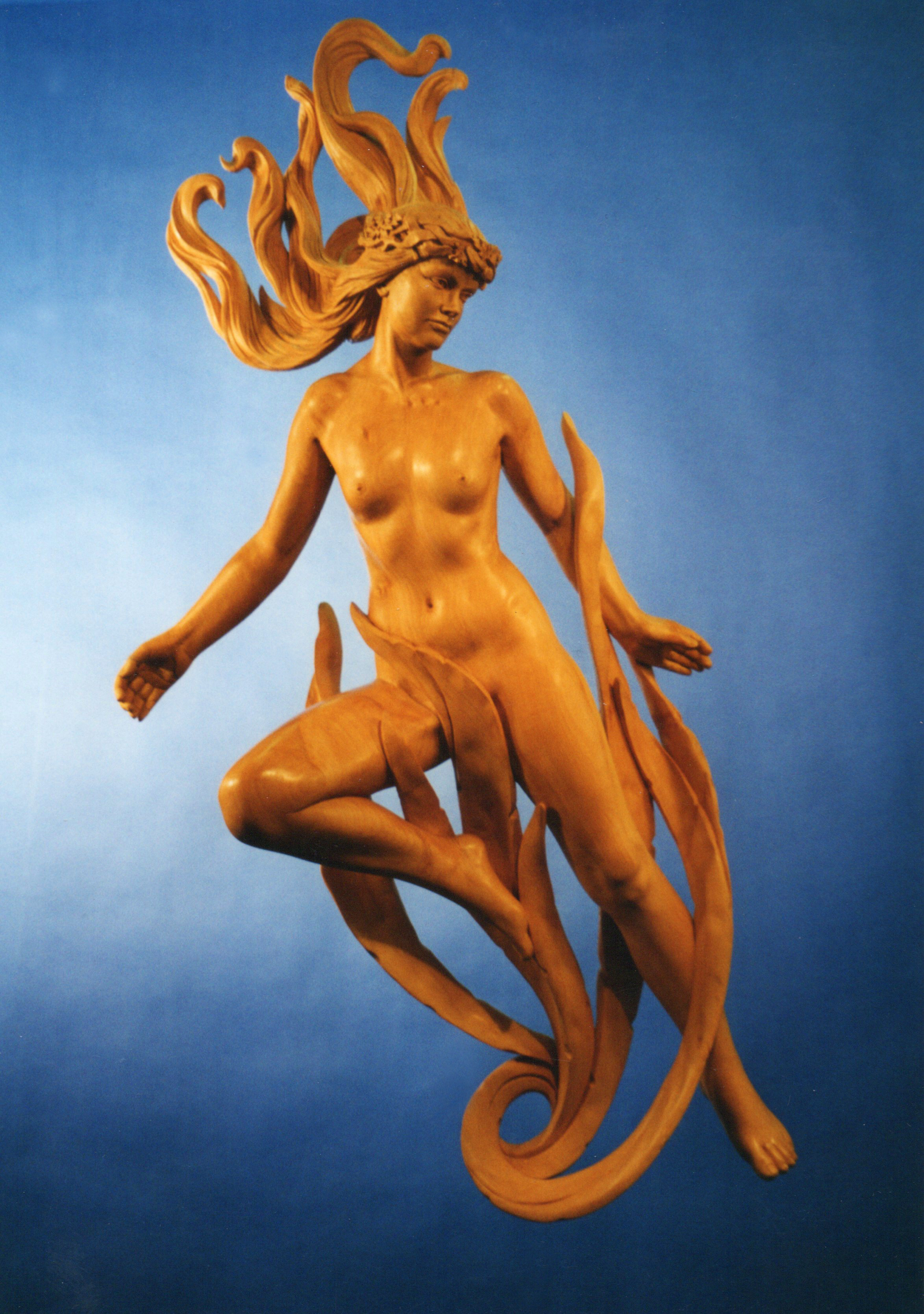
Salacia, Queen of the Ocean
Lime Wood
Private Commission

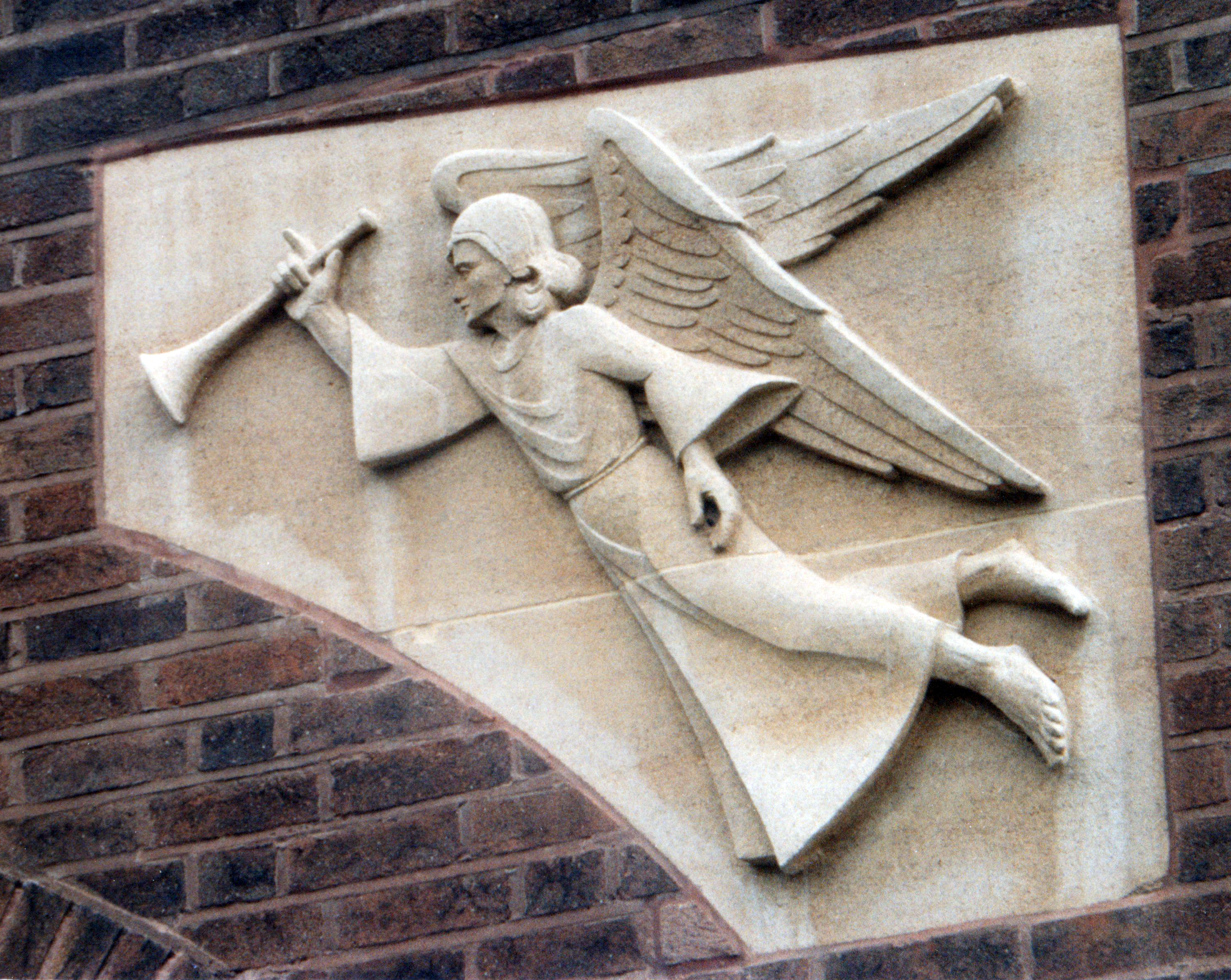
Archangel Gabriel
Clipsham stone
St Gabriel's RC Church, Walsall

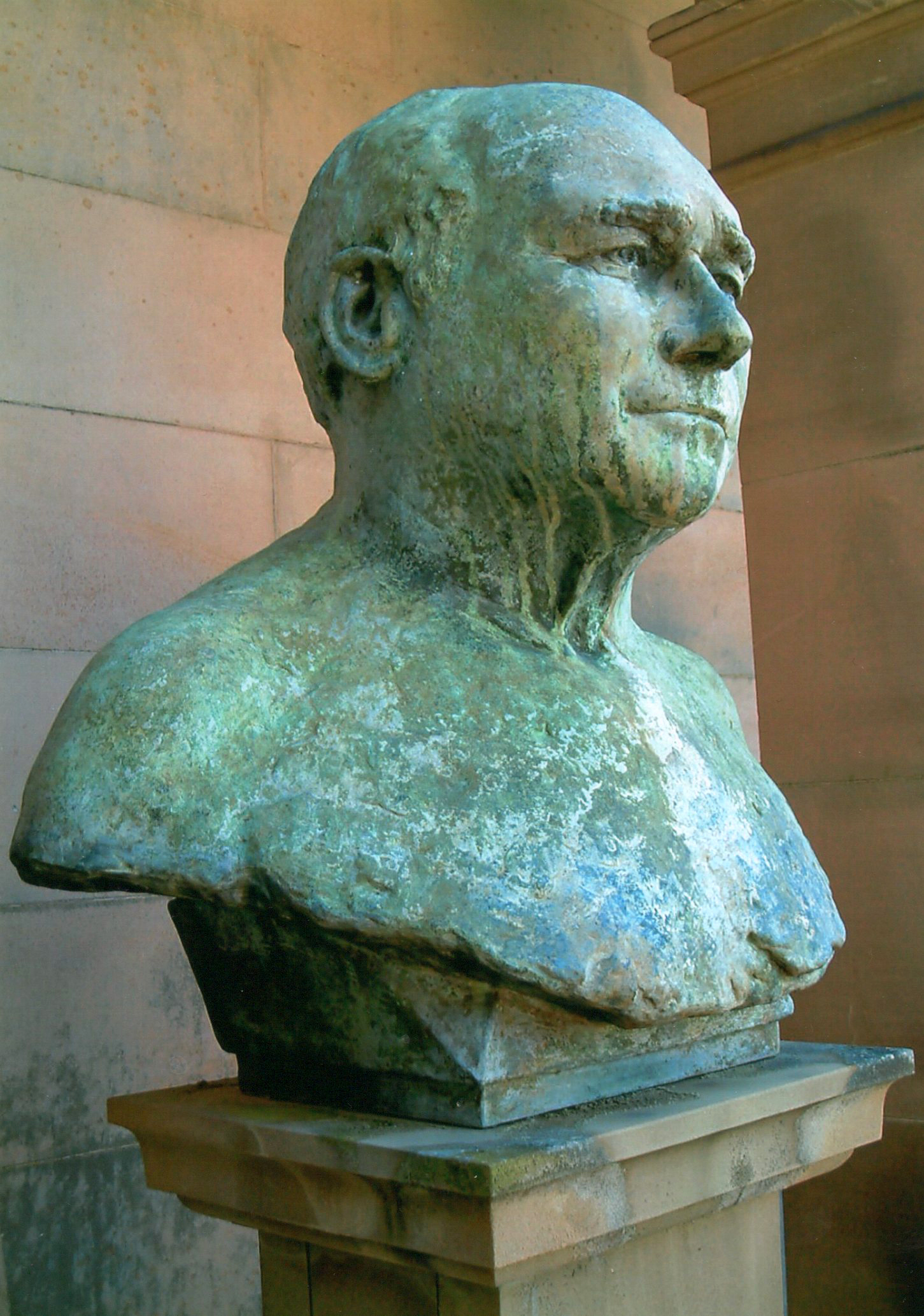
Sir William Dugdale, Bt
Bronze bust
Merevale Hall, Atherstone, Warwickshire

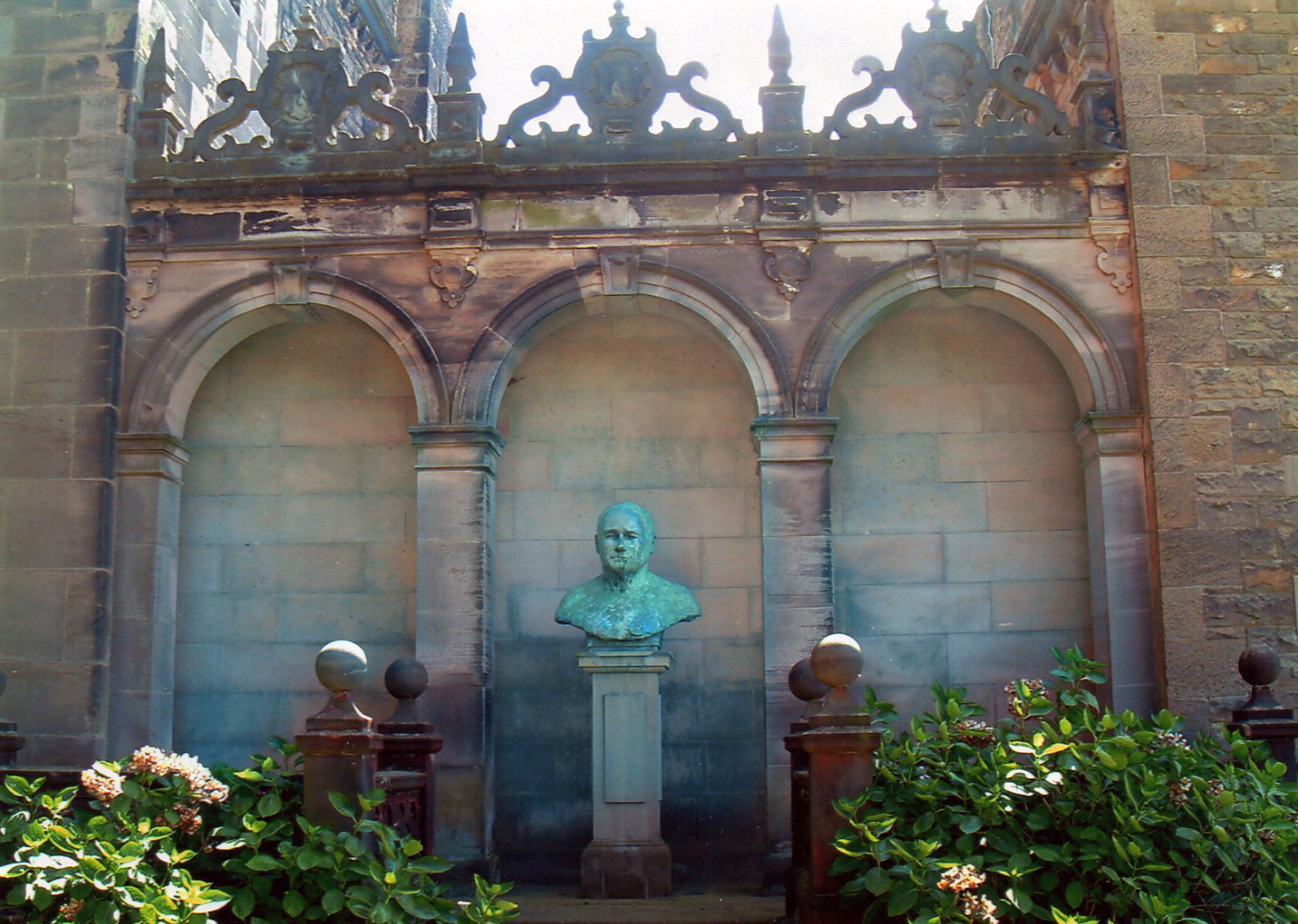
Sir William Dugdale, Bt
Bronze bust
Merevale Hall, Atherstone, Warwickshire

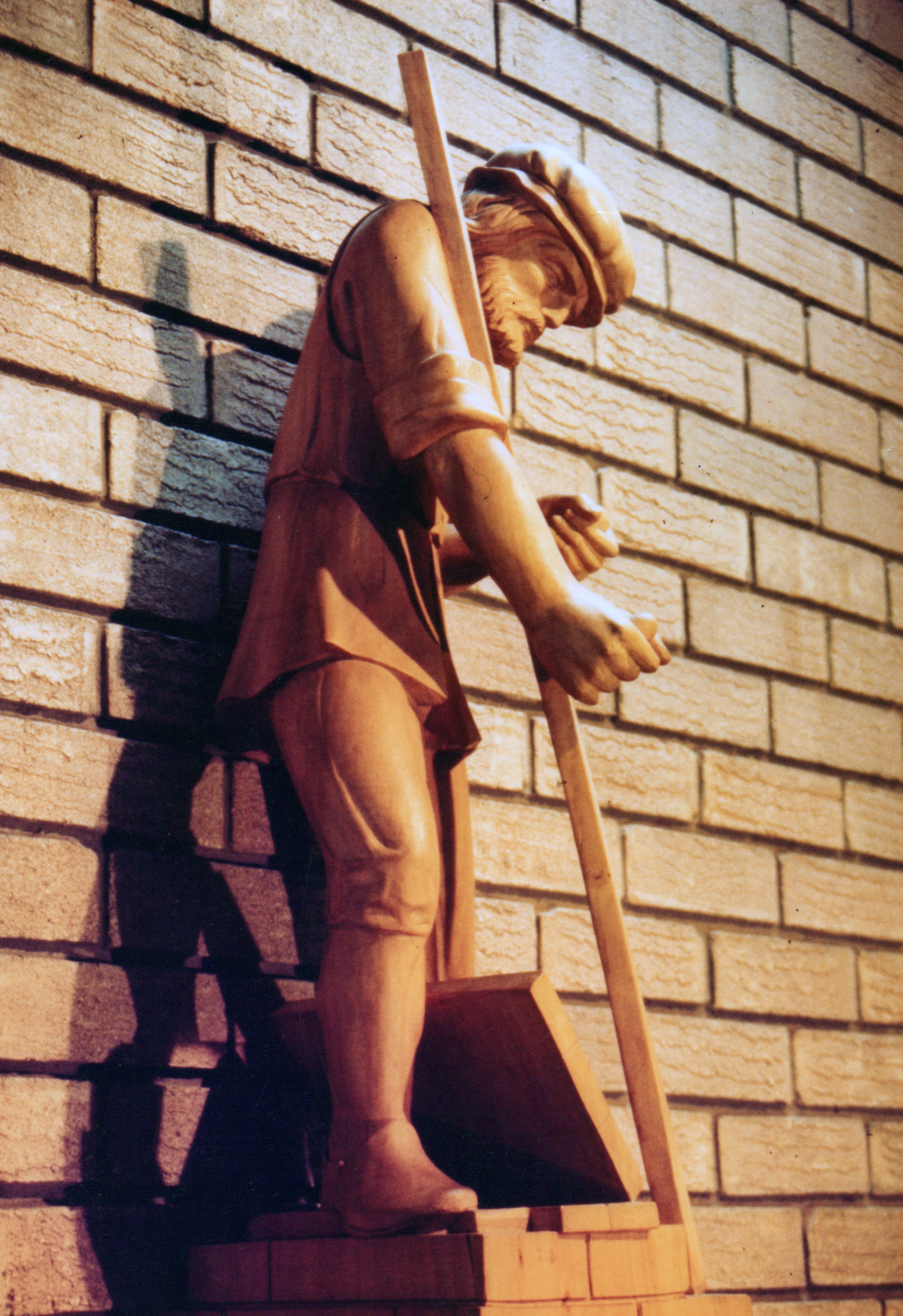
St Nicholas Owen
Lime wood
St Joseph's RC Church, Darlaston, Wednesbury

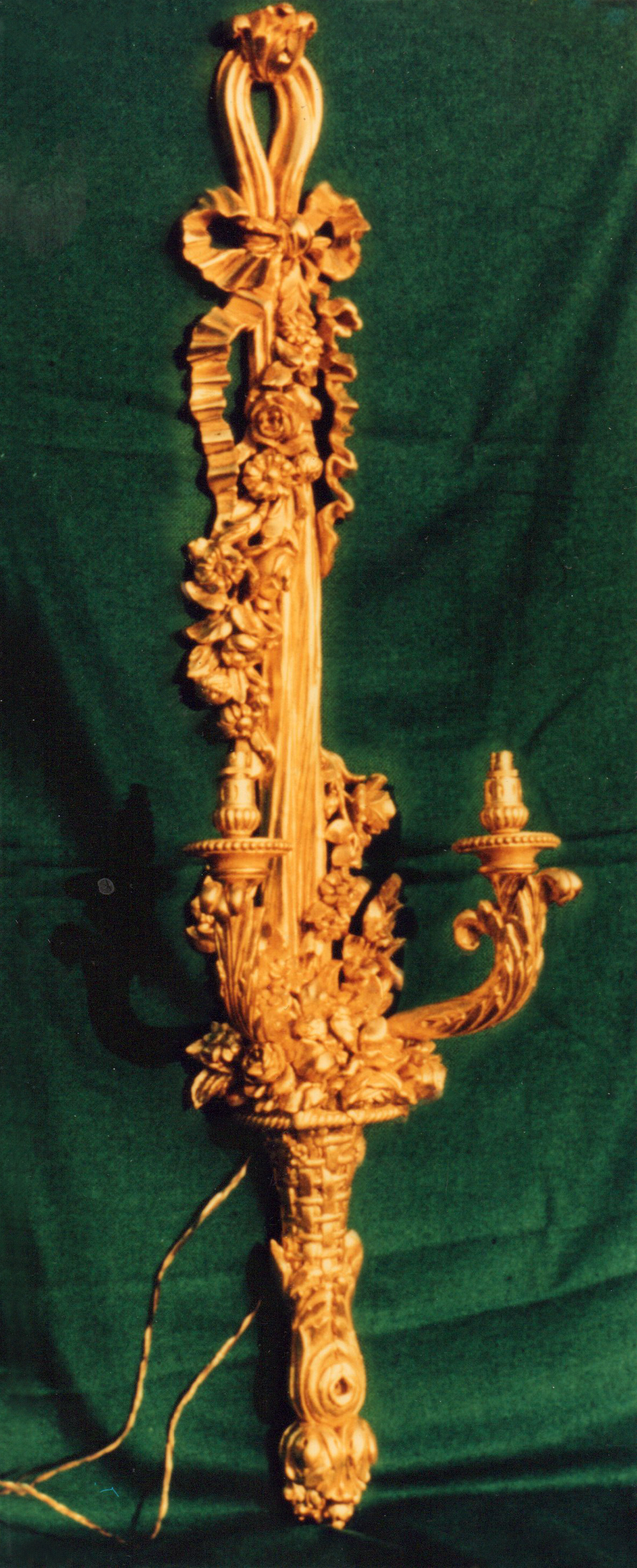
Wall Sconce
Lime wood, gilded
Private collection

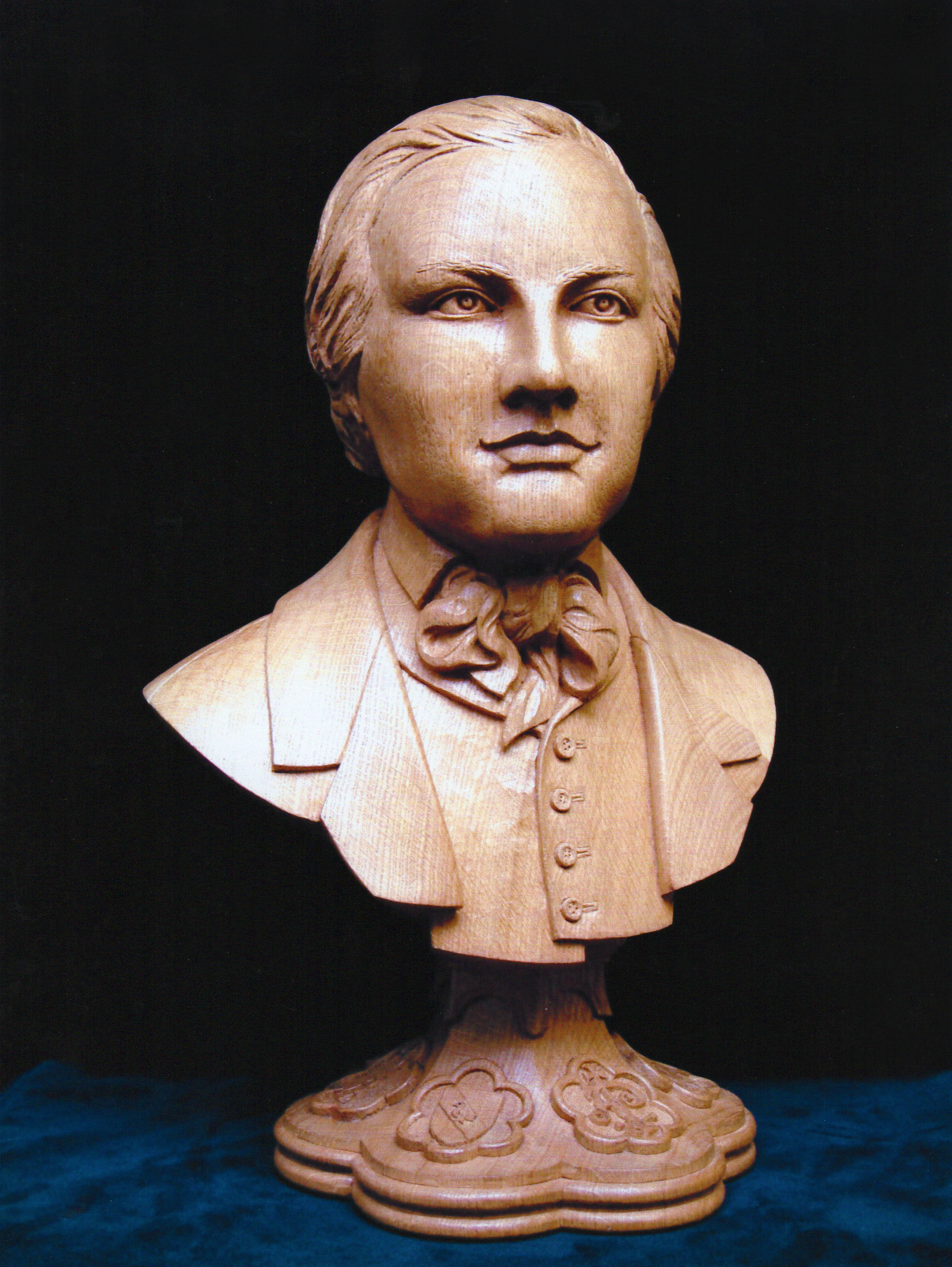
Augustus Pugin
Japanese Oak
Private collection

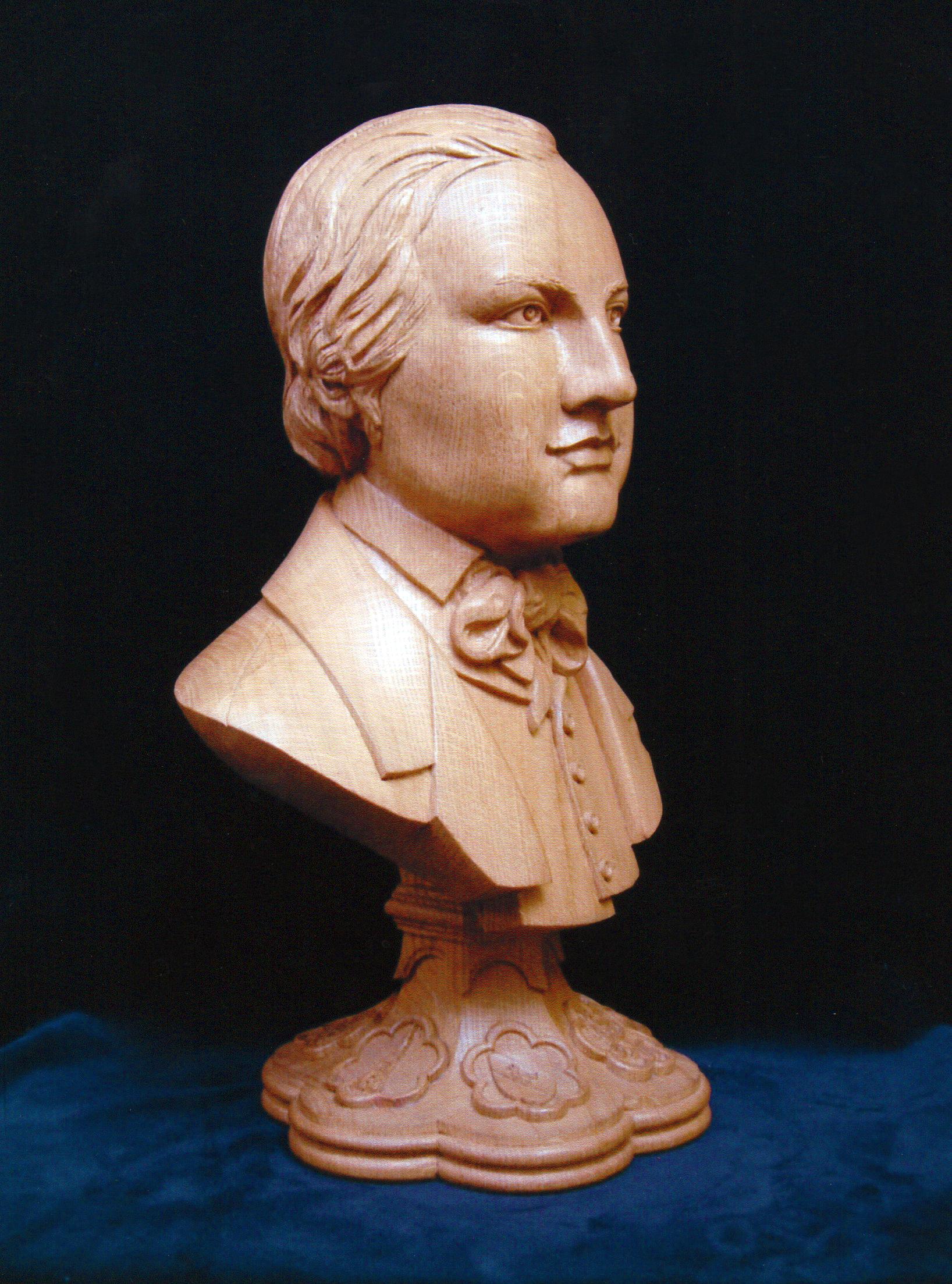
Augustus Pugin
Japanese Oak
Private collection

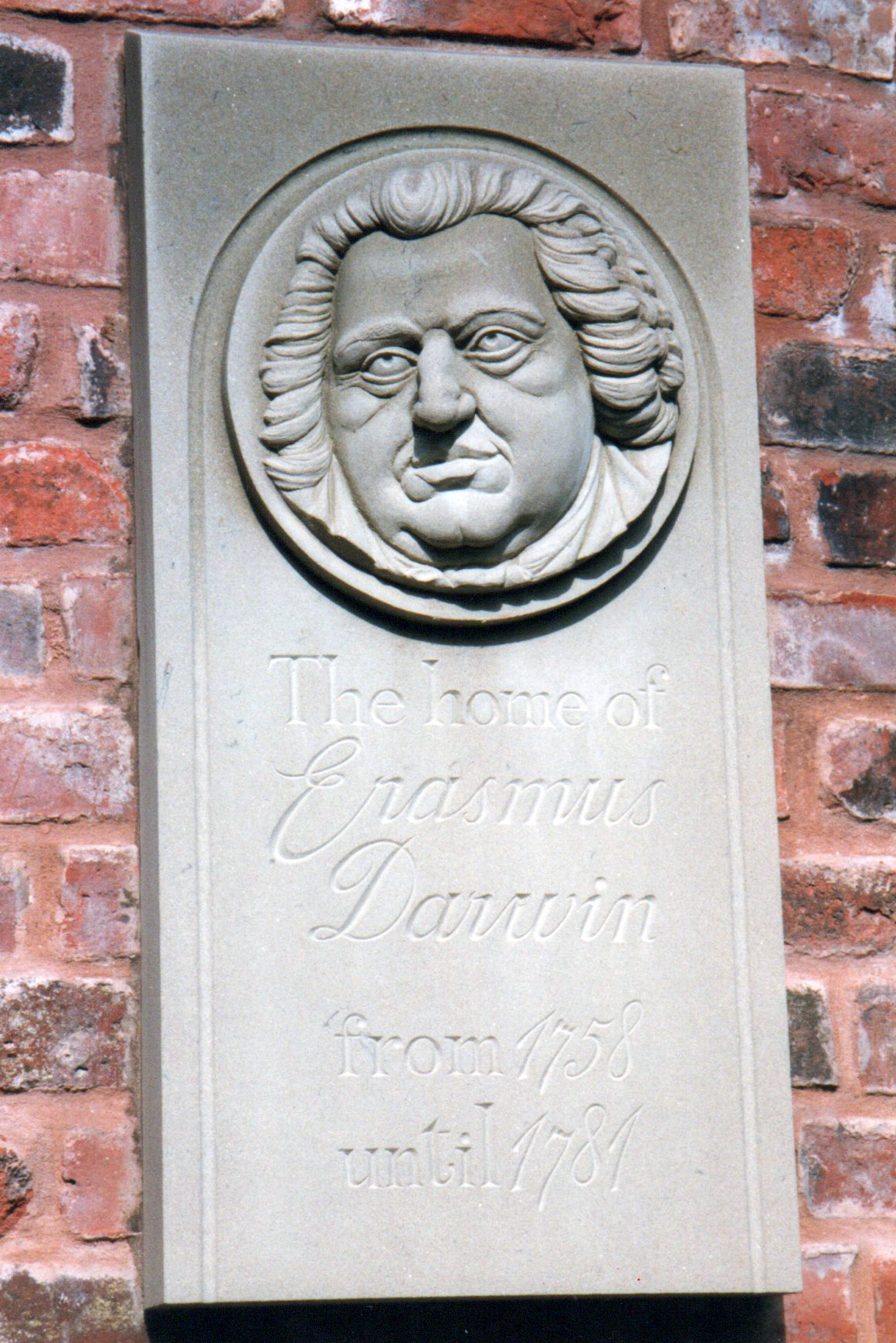
Erasmus Darwin
Stone
Erasmus Darwin House, Lichfield

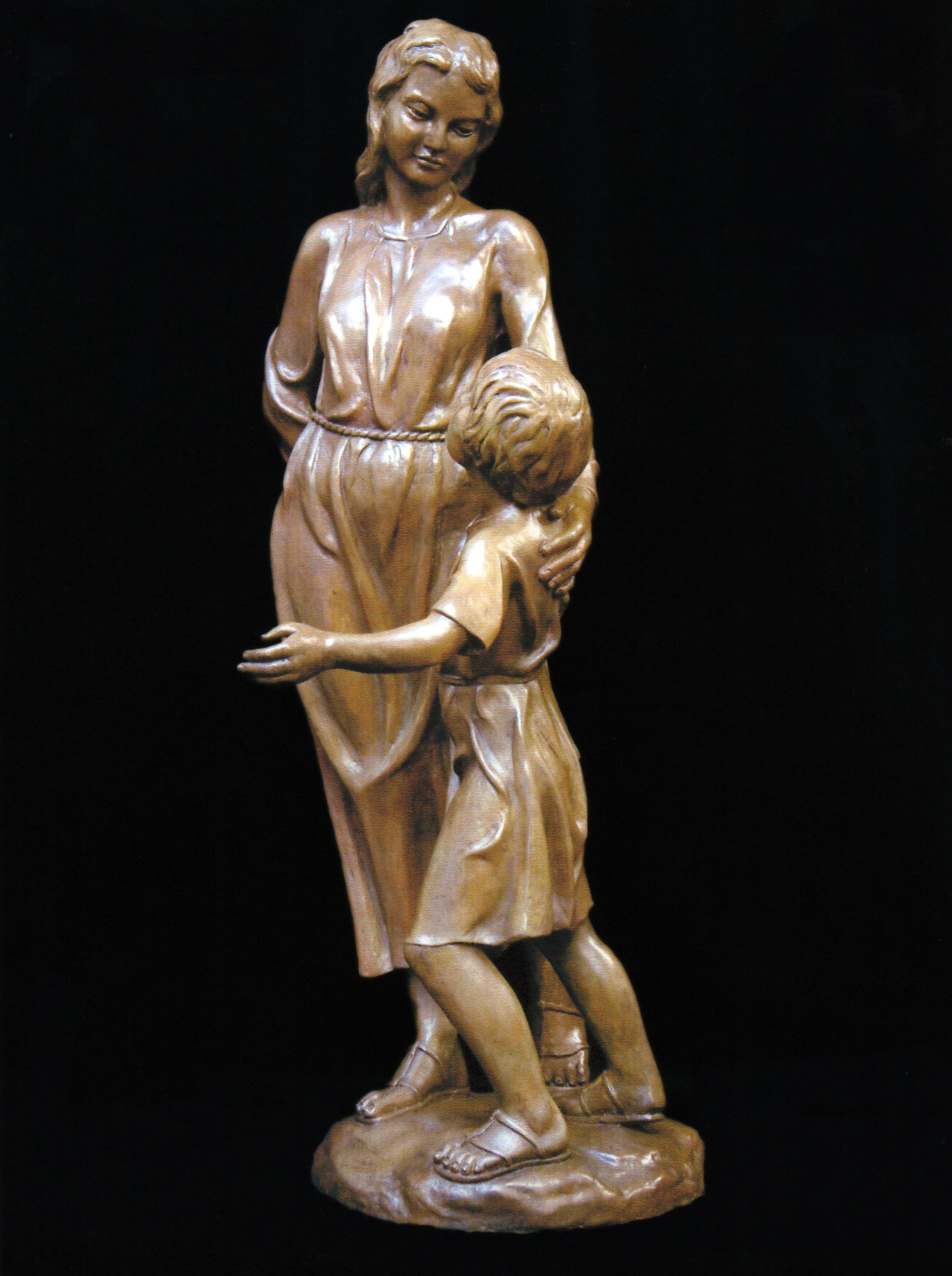
Blessed Virgin Mary and Child Christ
Bronze
Church of Our Lady, Merevale, Warwickshire

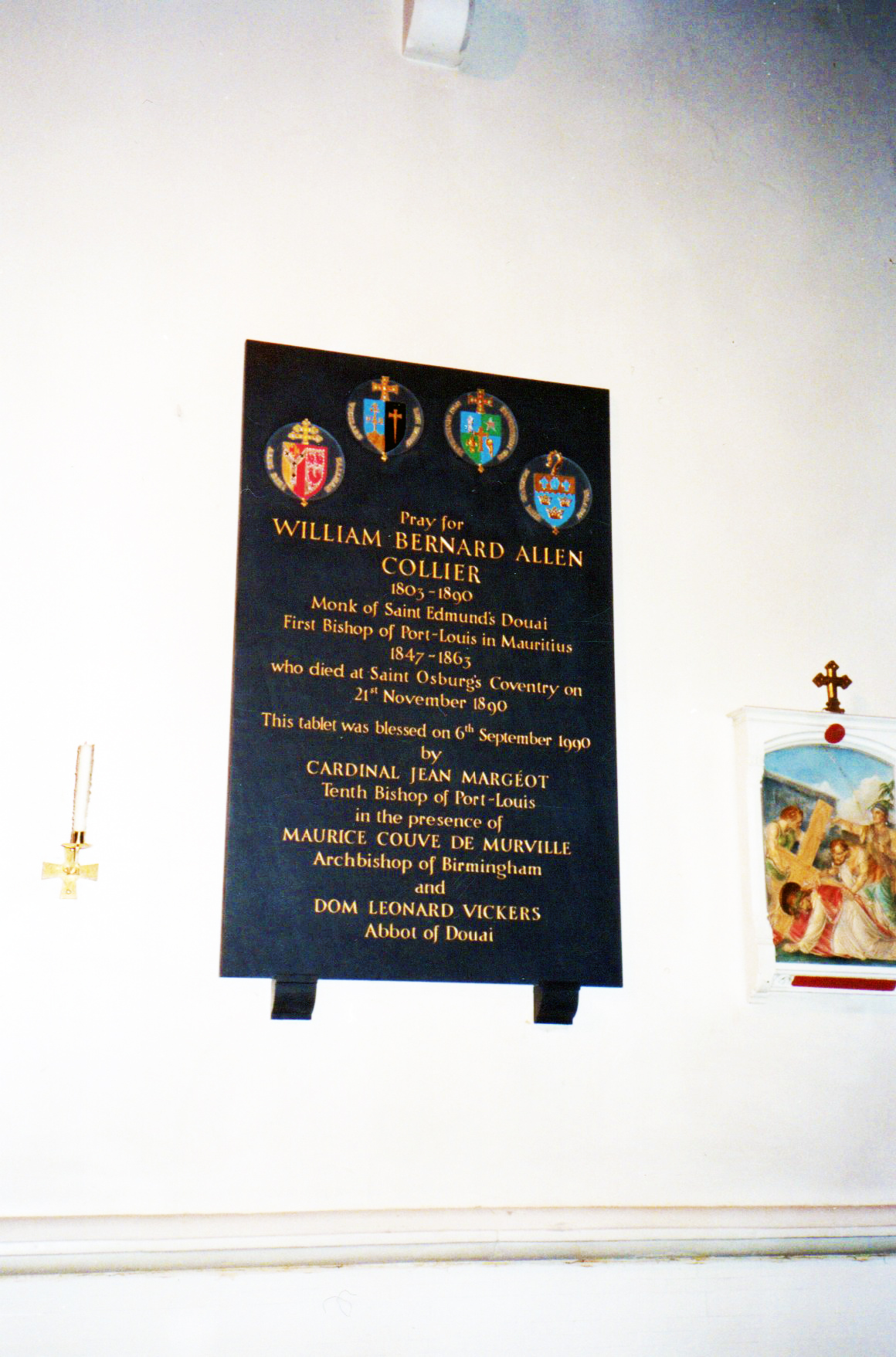
Memorial Tablet
Welsh blue slate
St Osburg's RC Church, Coventry

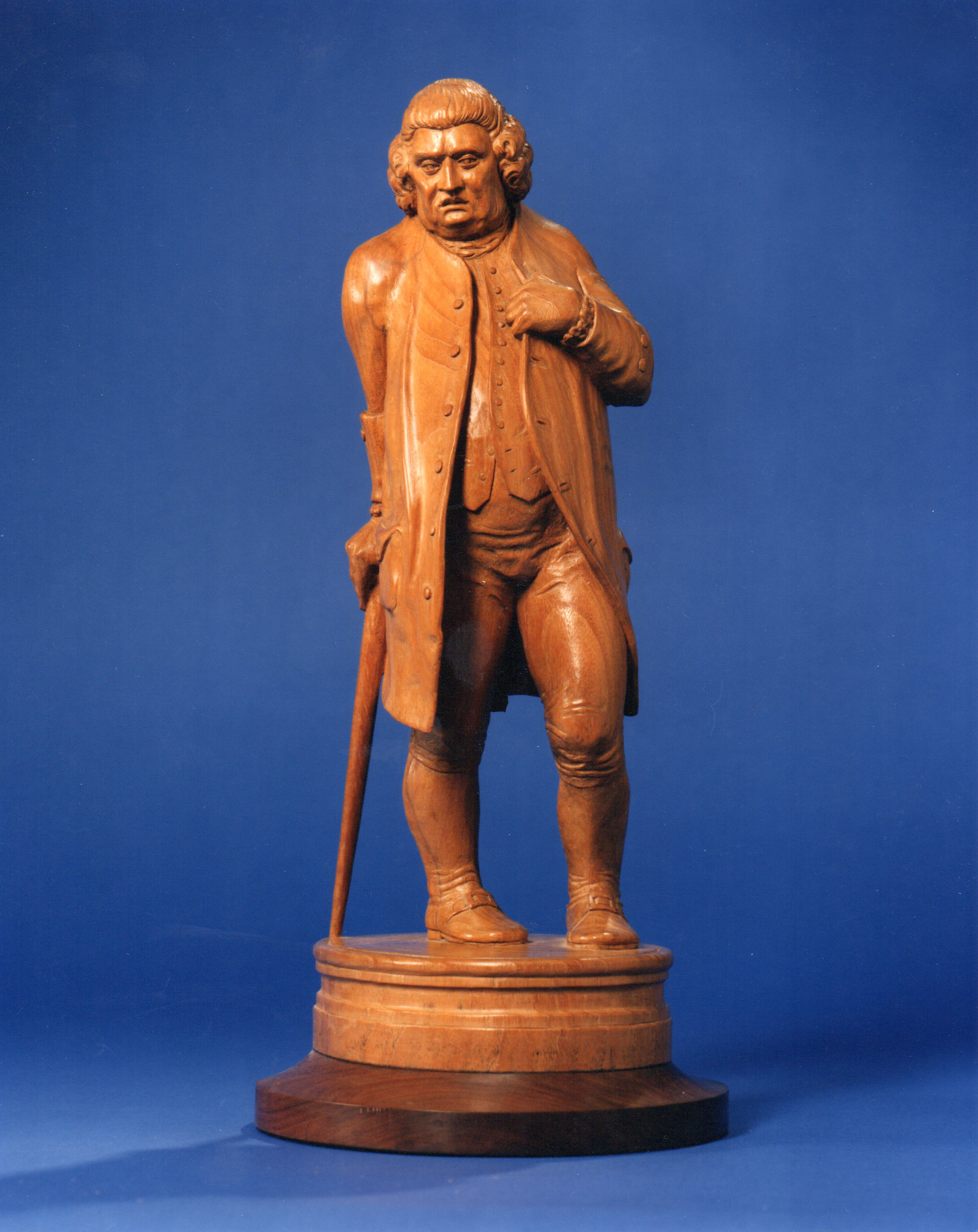
Dr Samuel Johnson
Burmese teak
Samuel Johnson Birthplace Museum, Lichfield

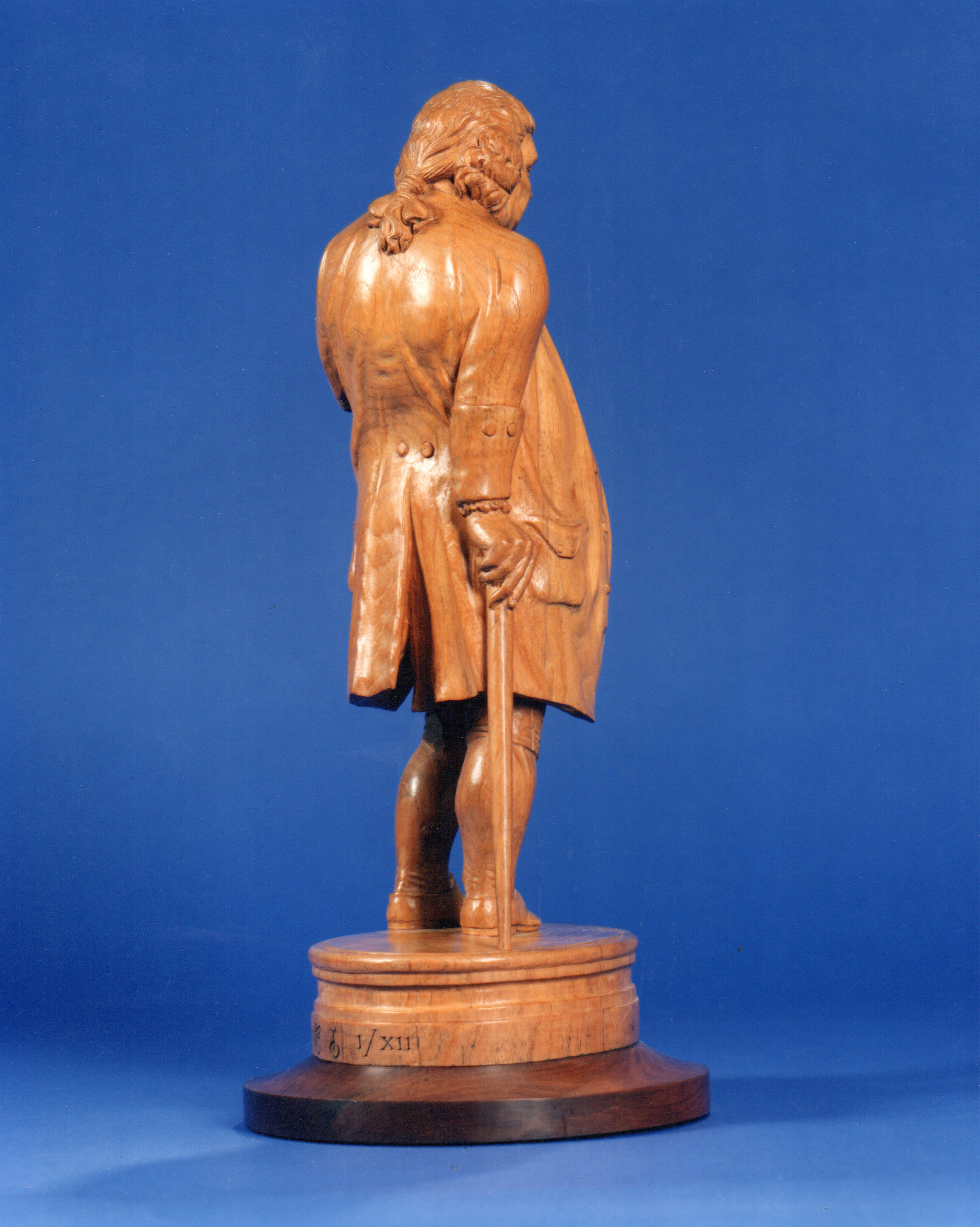
Dr Samuel Johnson
Burmese teak
Samuel Johnson Birthplace Museum, Lichfield

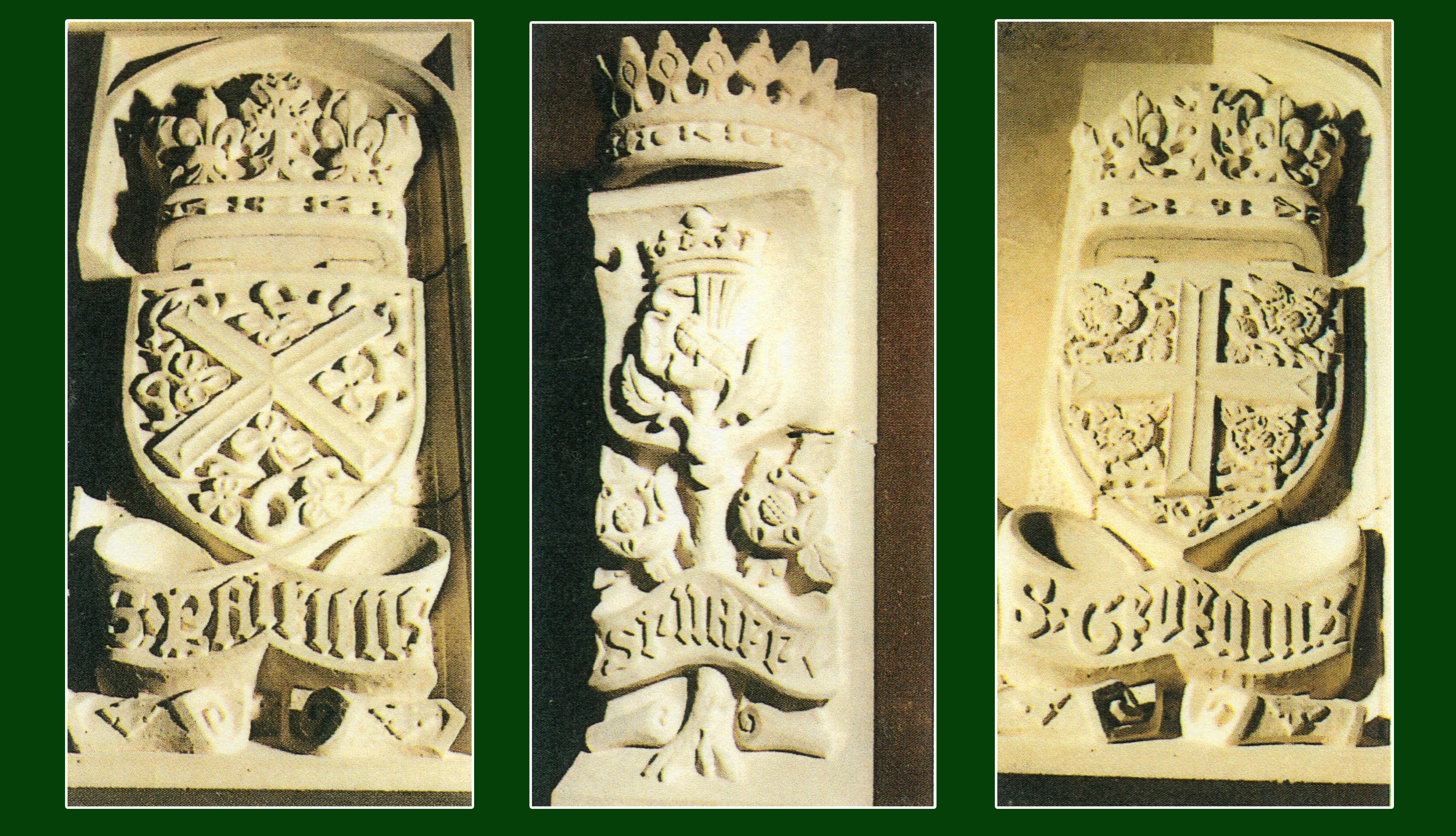
Heraldic Symbols
Stone
Palace of Westminster

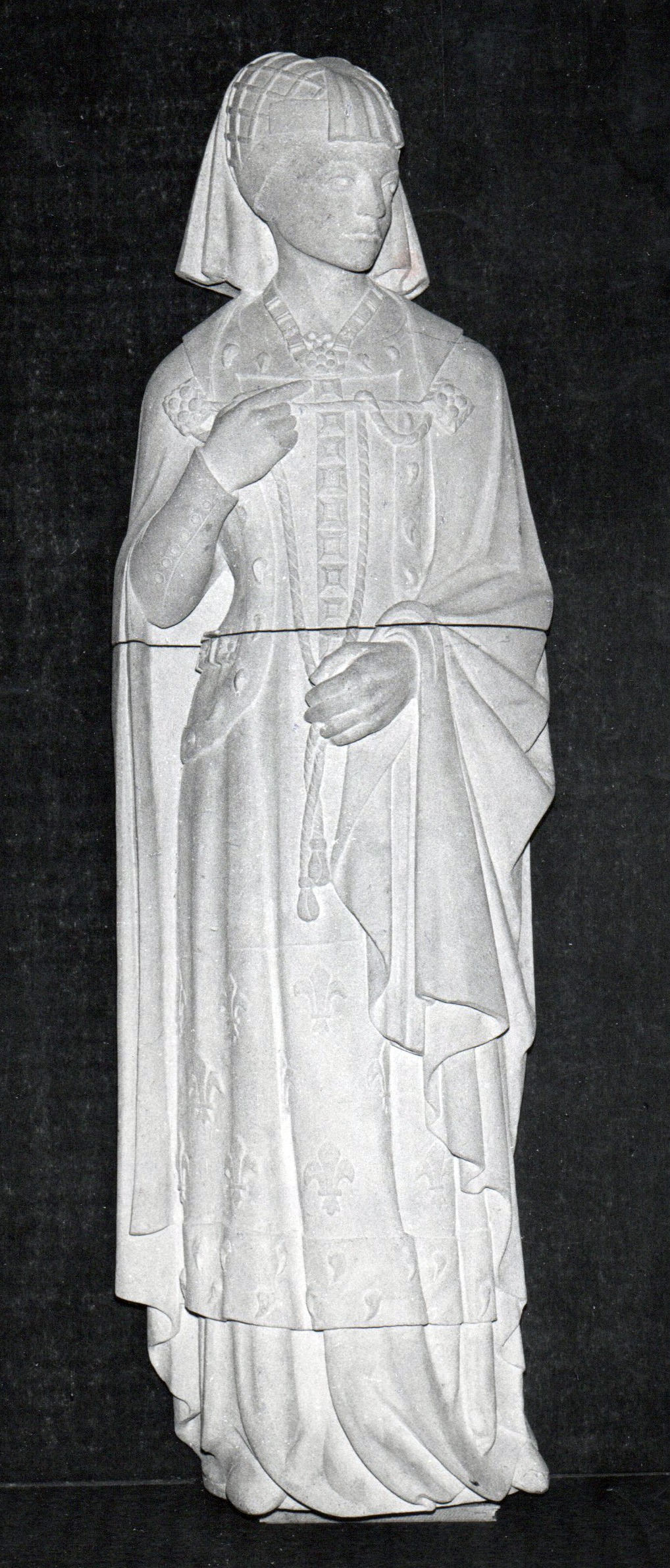
Catherine of Valois
Portland Stone
Westminster Abbey, north transept

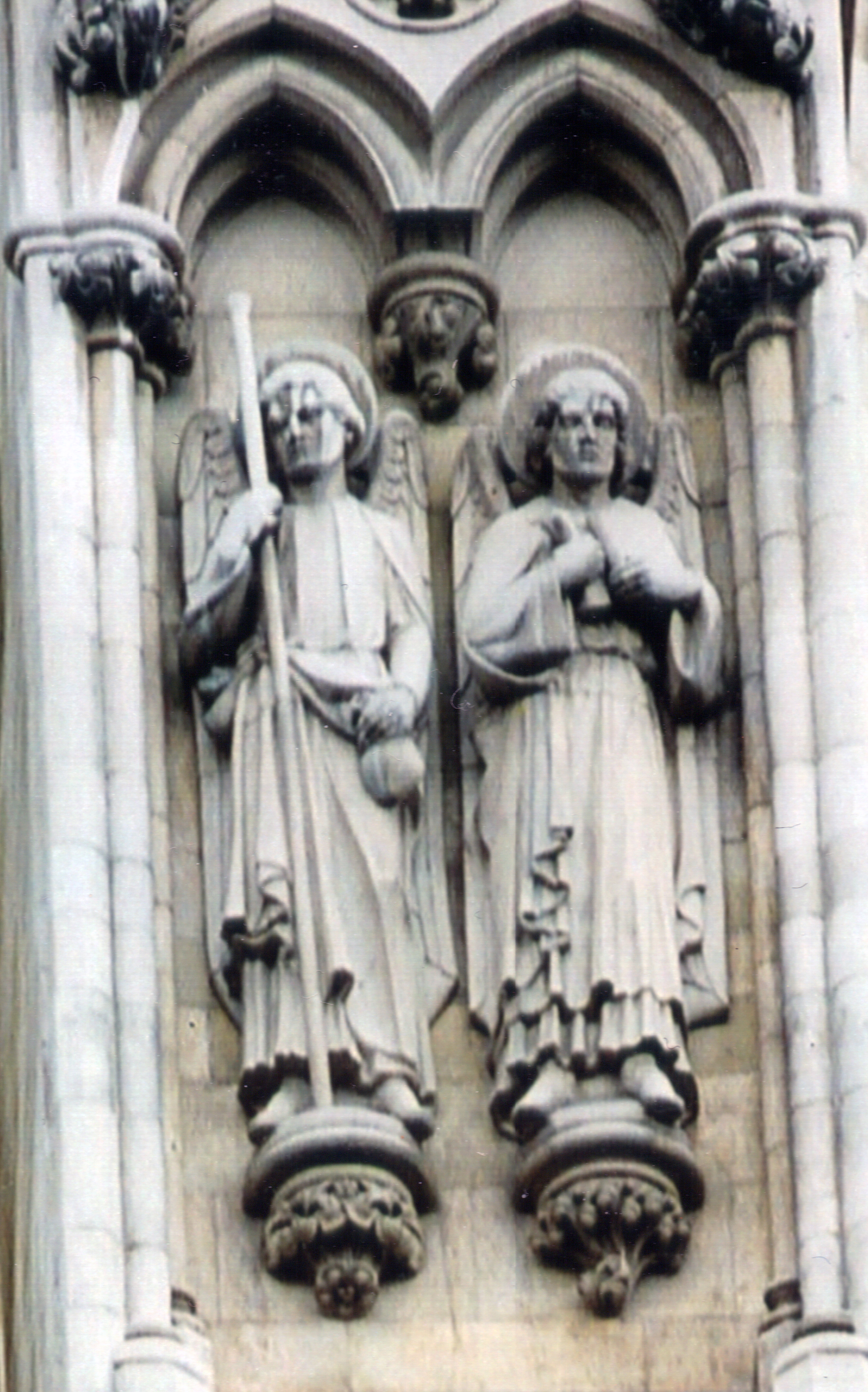
Archangel Raphael & Uriel
Portland Stone
Westminster Abbey – Upper part of the north transept

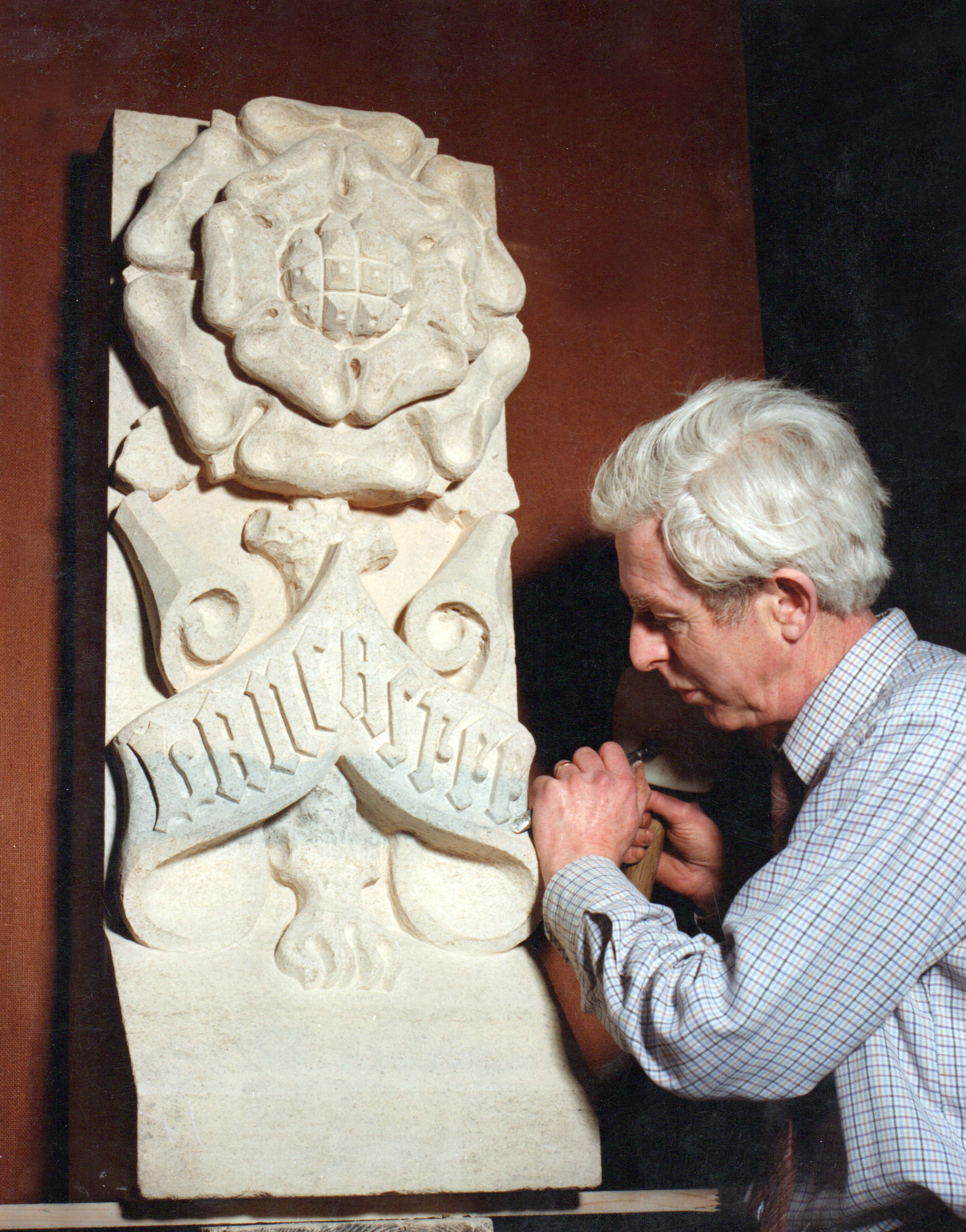
Heraldic Symbols
Guiting Stone
Palace of Westminster

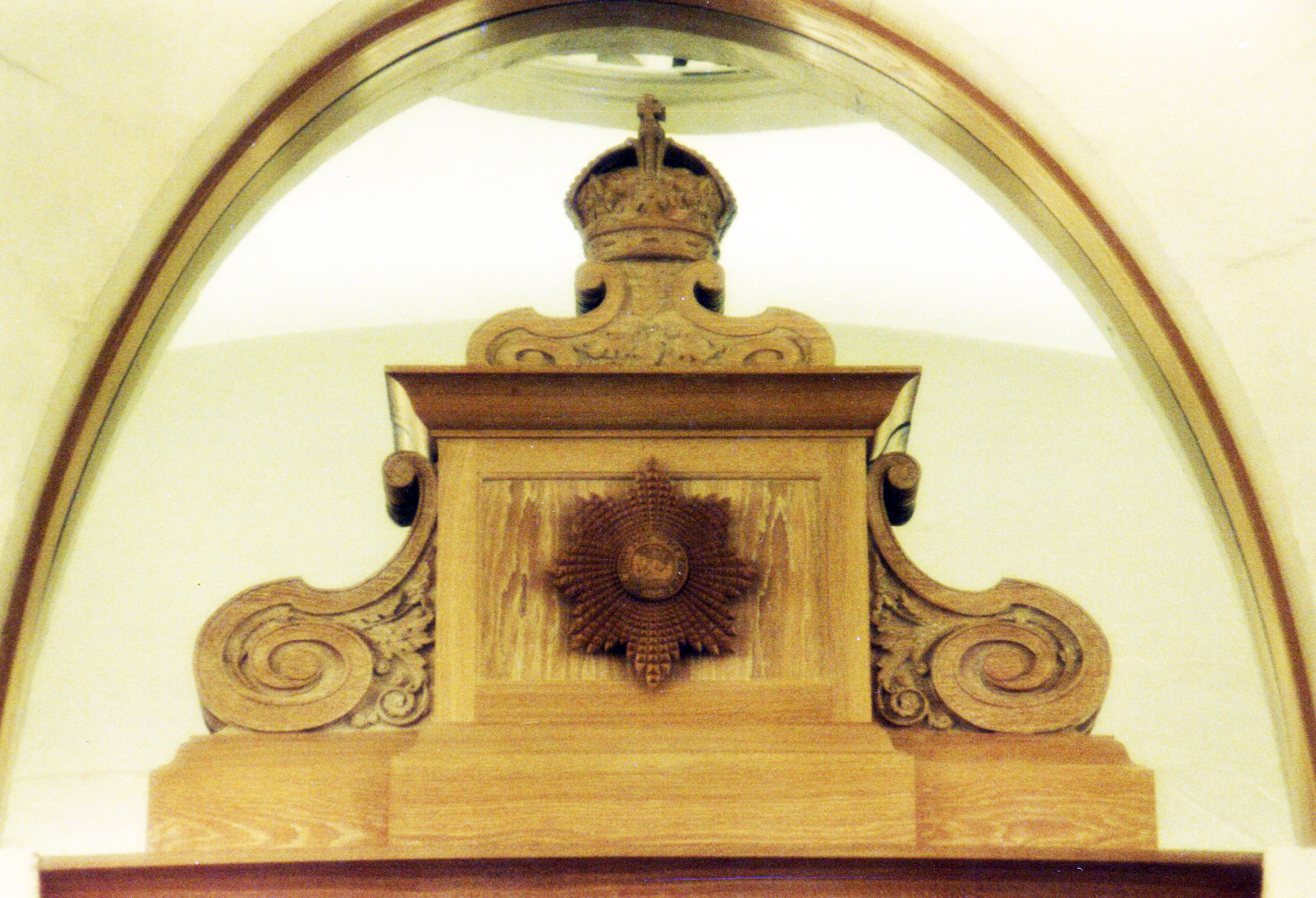
Trophy Box
Oak
Order of the British Empire Chapel, St Paul's Cathedral, London

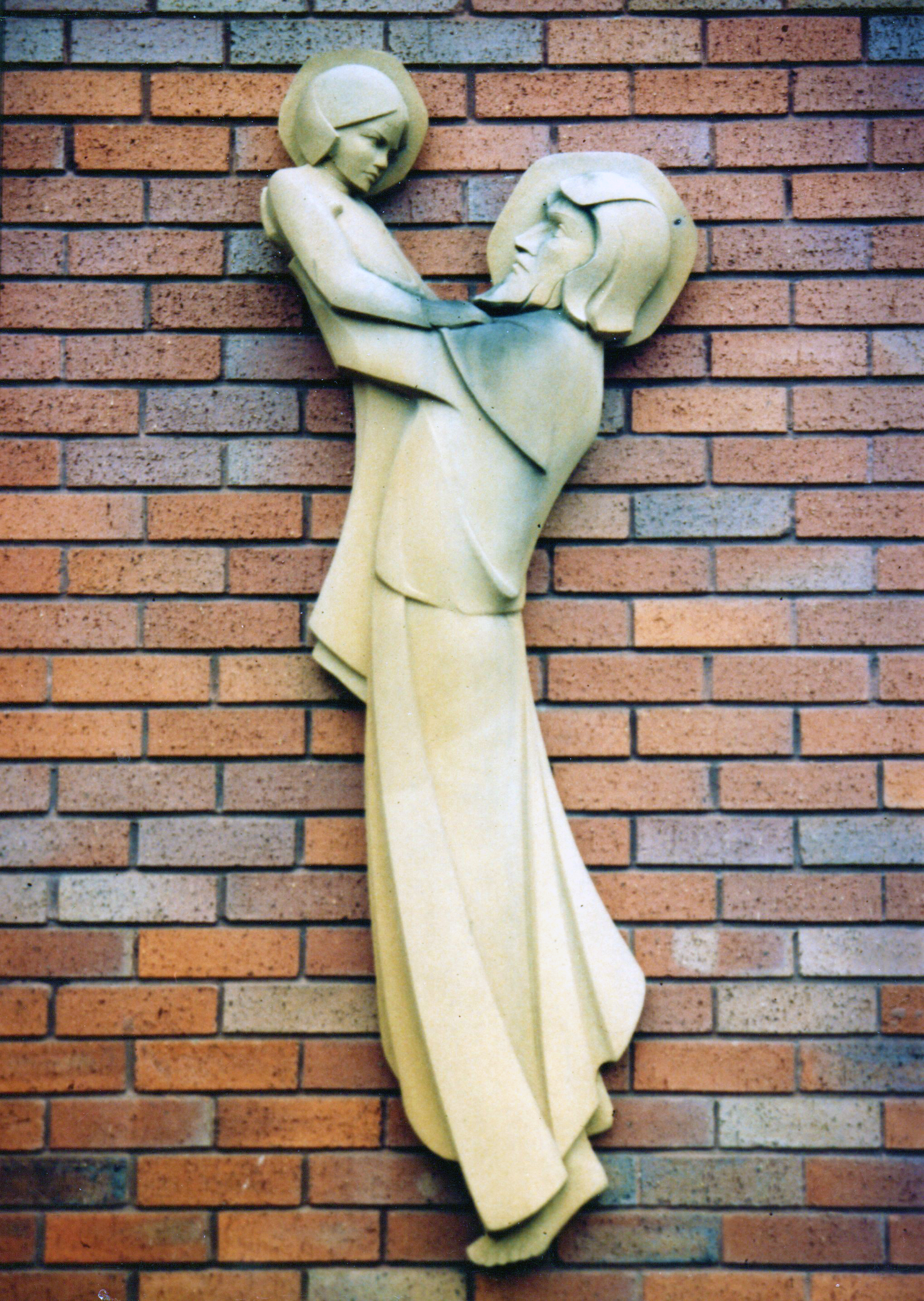
St Joseph and Child Christ
York Stone
St Joseph's RC Church, Darlaston

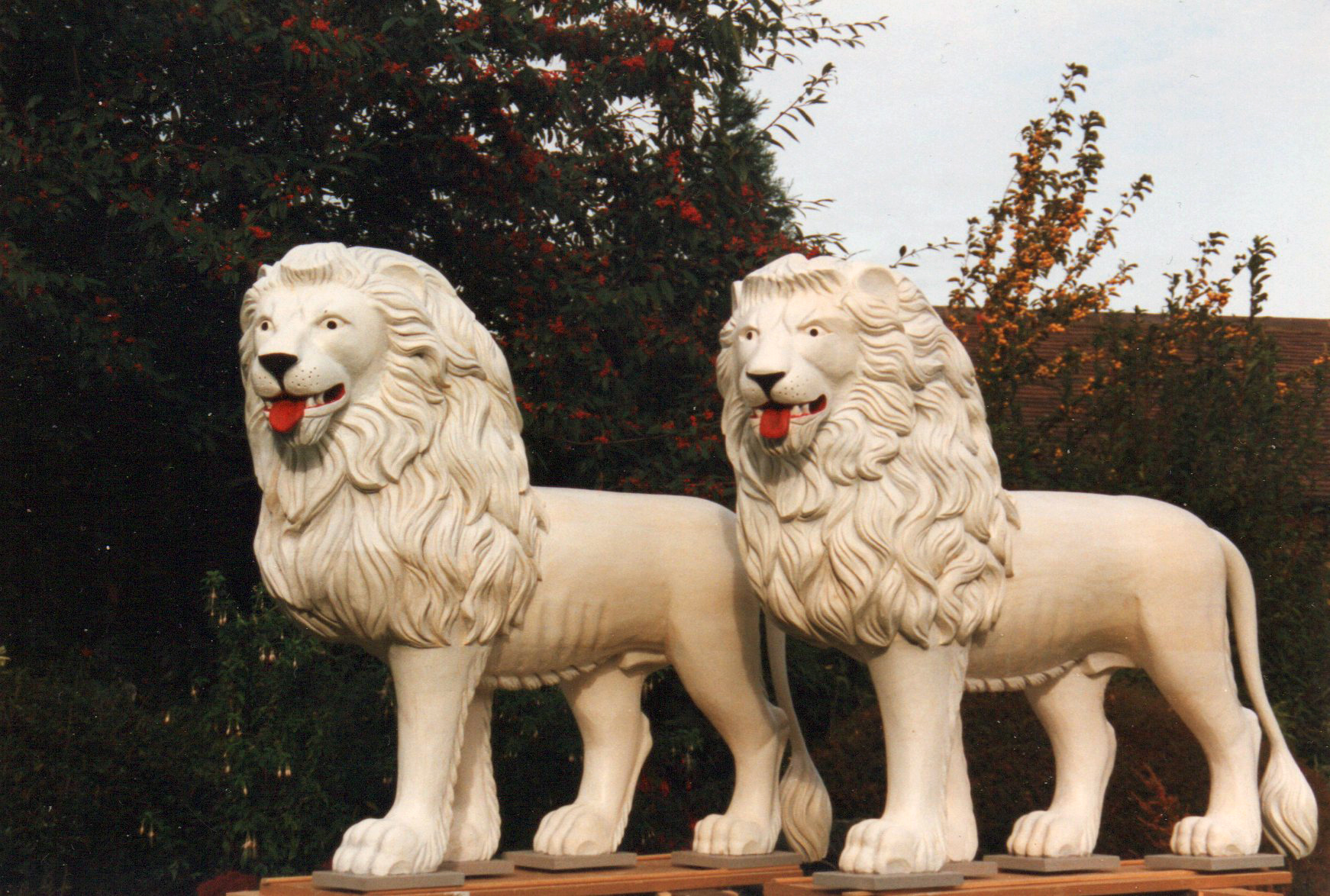
White Lions
Cedar
White Lion Hotel, Banbury

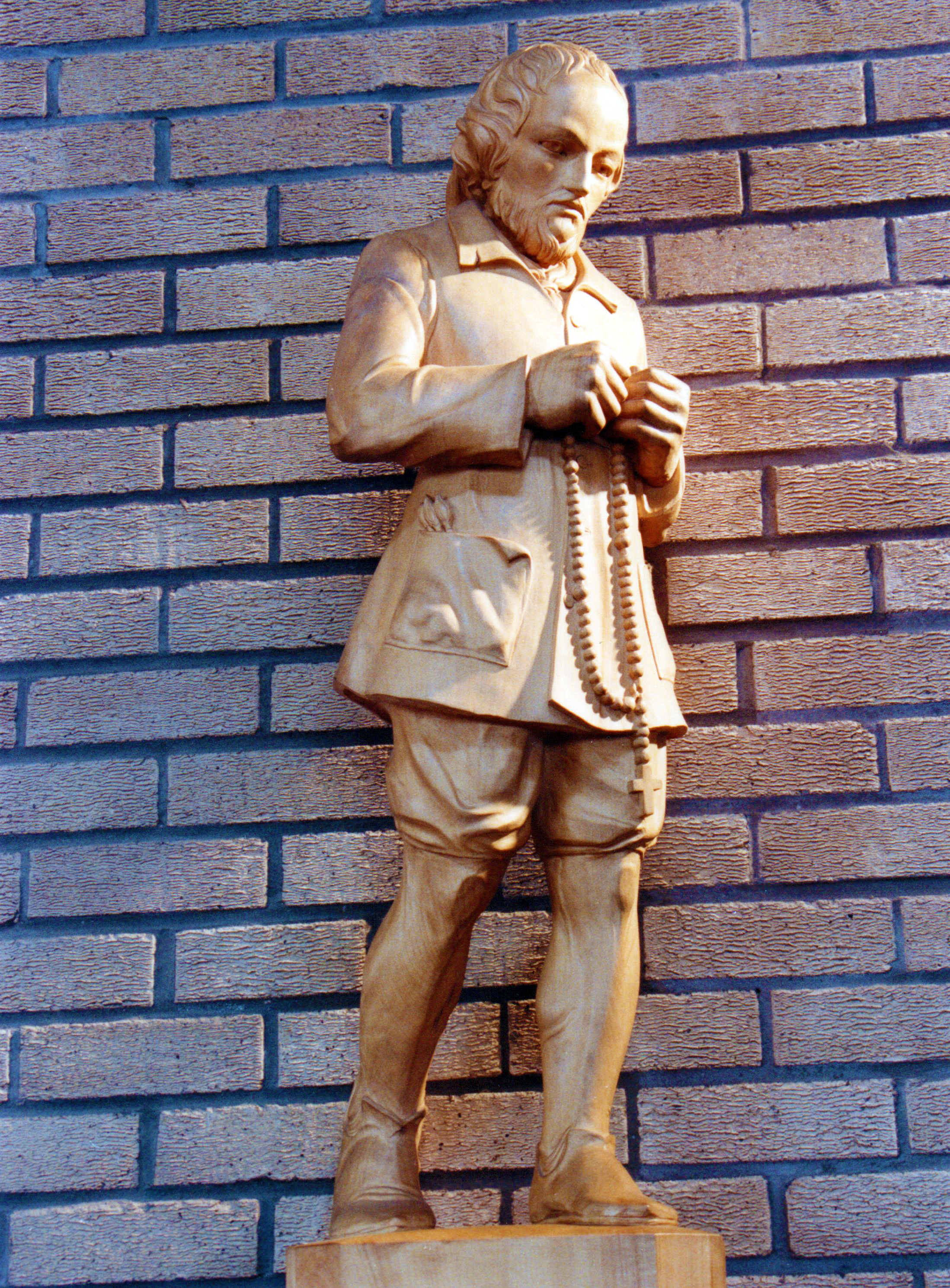
St Ambrose Barlow
Lime wood
St Ambrose Barlow RC Church, Birmingham, UK

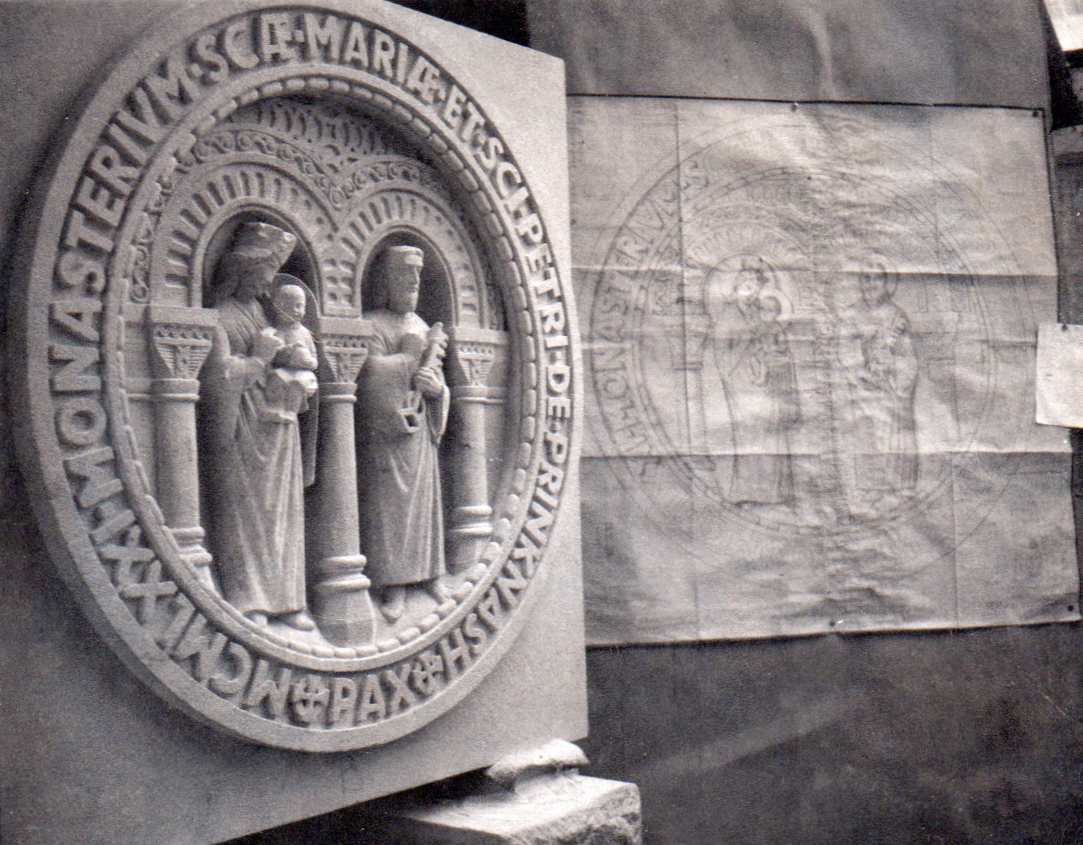
Rondel, Our Lady & St Peter
Cotswold Stone
Prinknash Abbey, Cranham, Gloucester

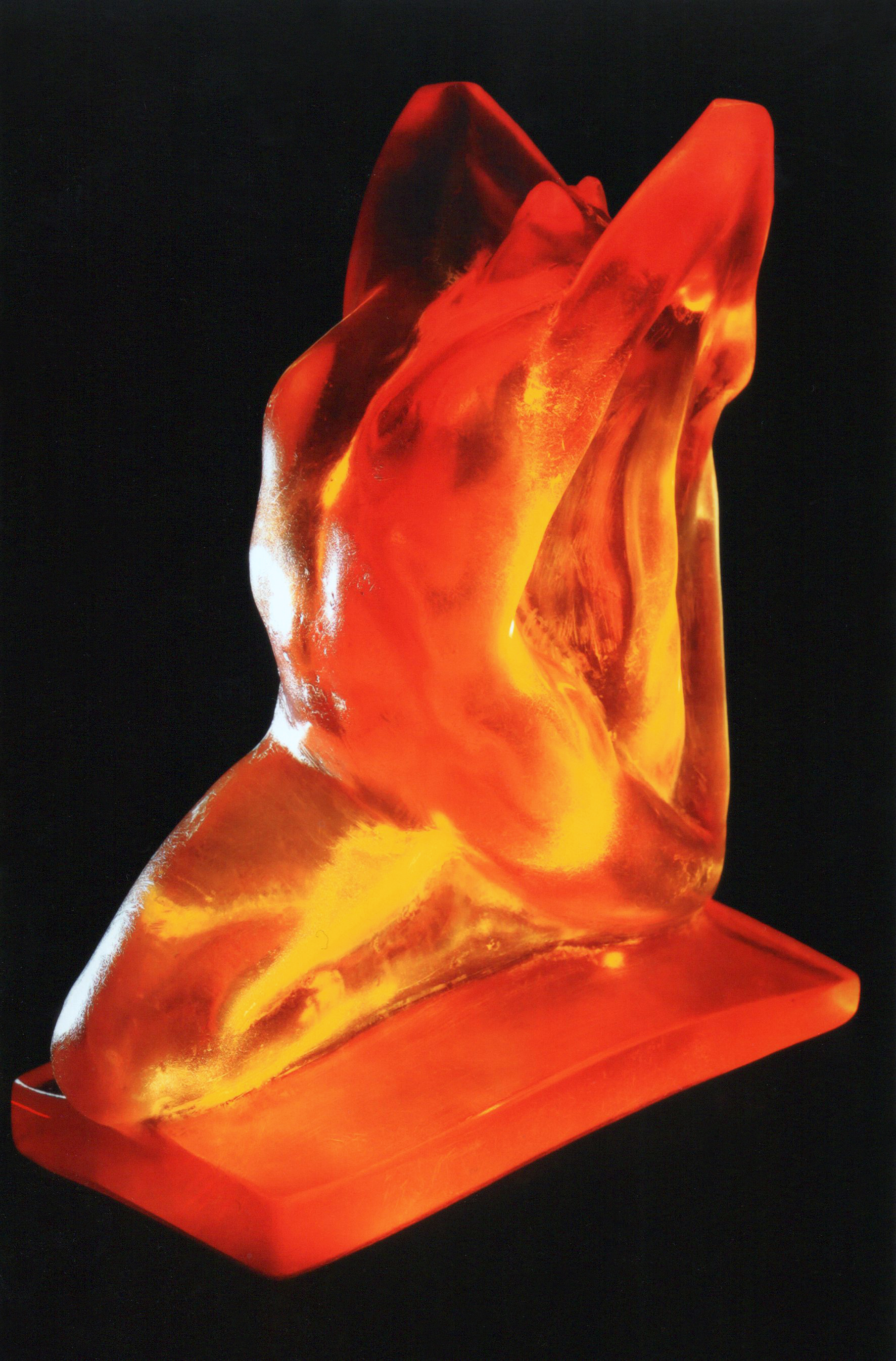
Yoga figure
Resin
Sculptors collection

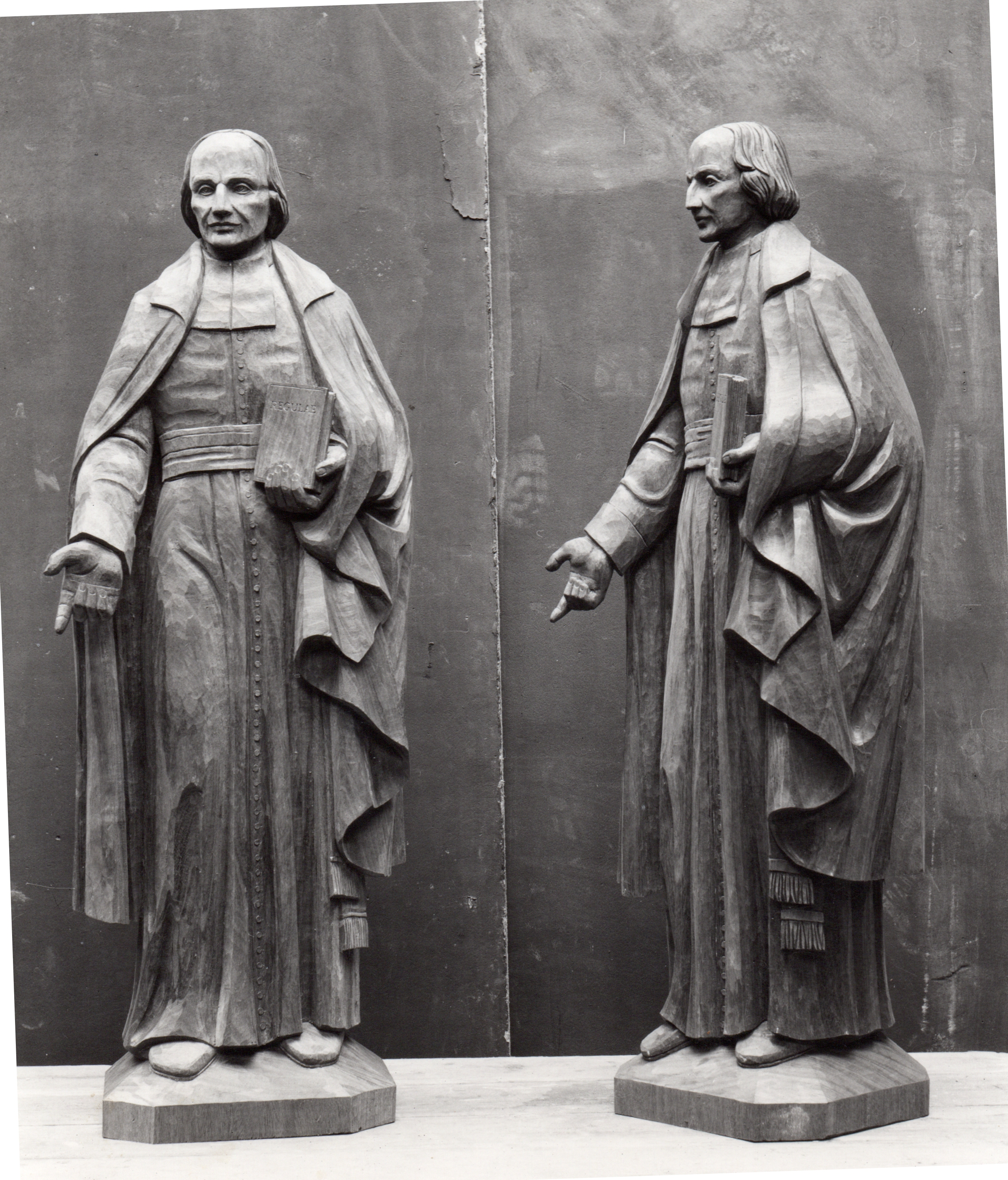
St John Vianney
Mahogany
Location believed to be Ontario, Canada

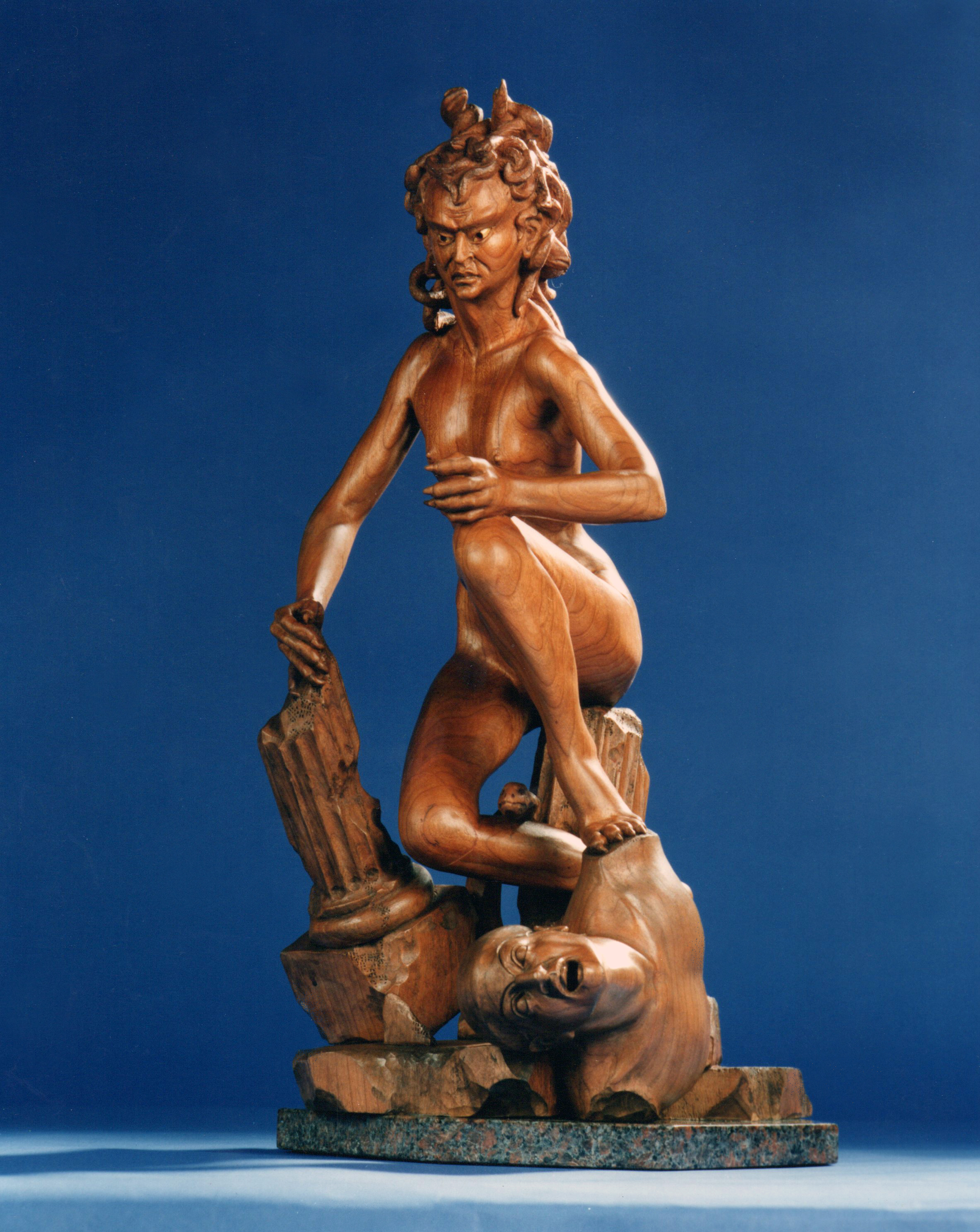
Medusa
American Cherry
Sculptors collection

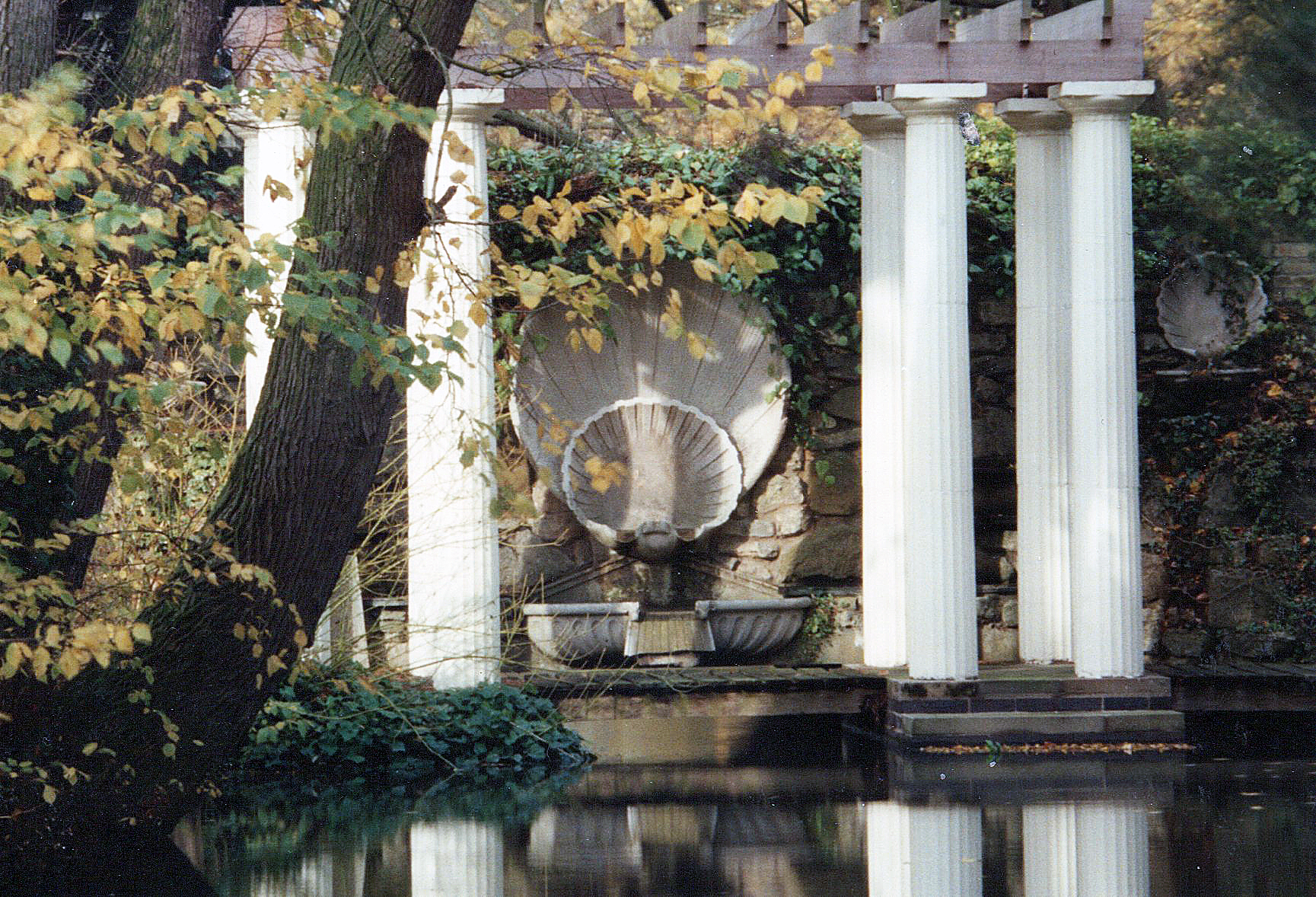
Triple Shell Fountain
Portland Stone
Abbots Ripton Hall, Huntingdonshire

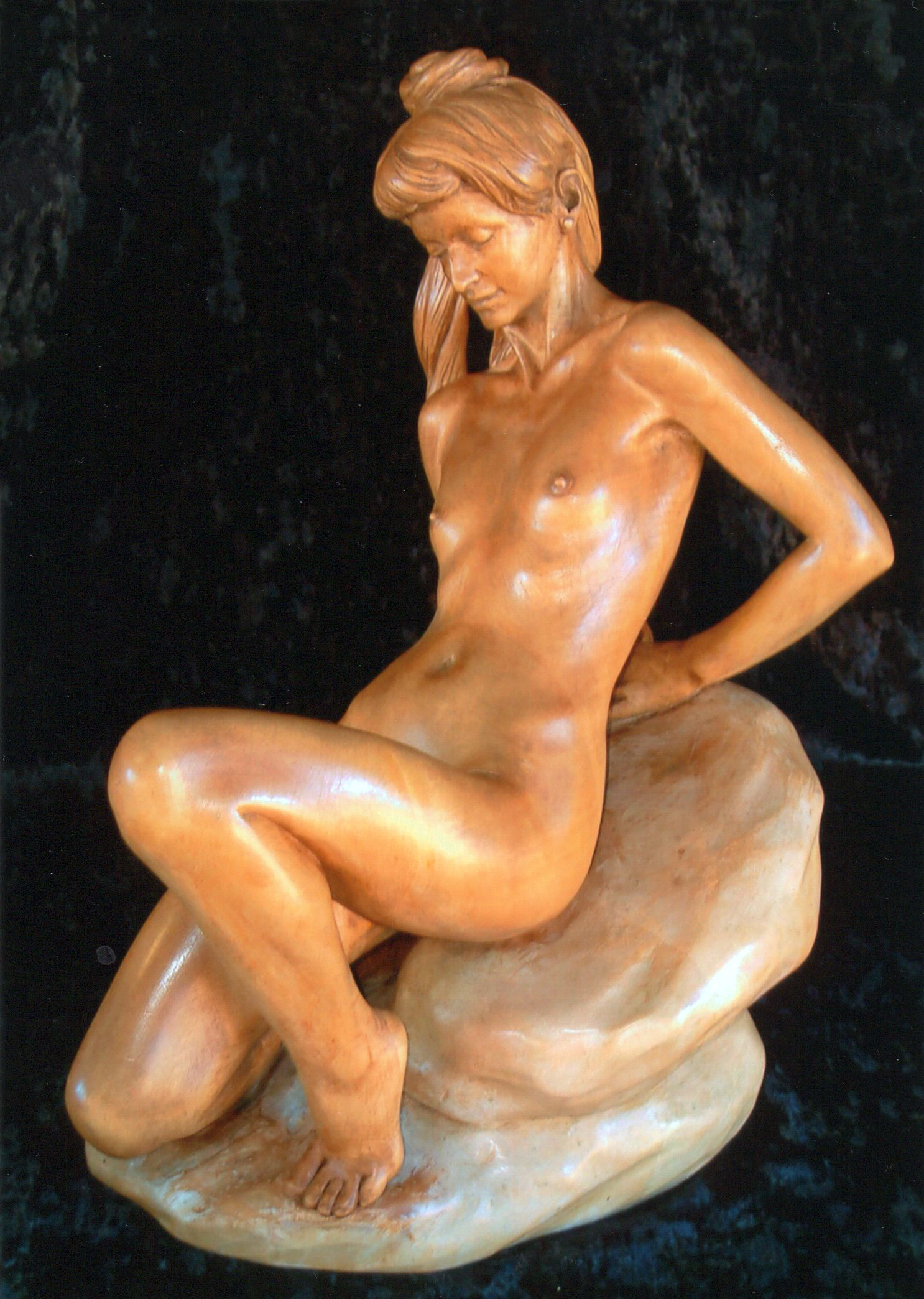
Amphitrite
Lime wood
Sculptors collection

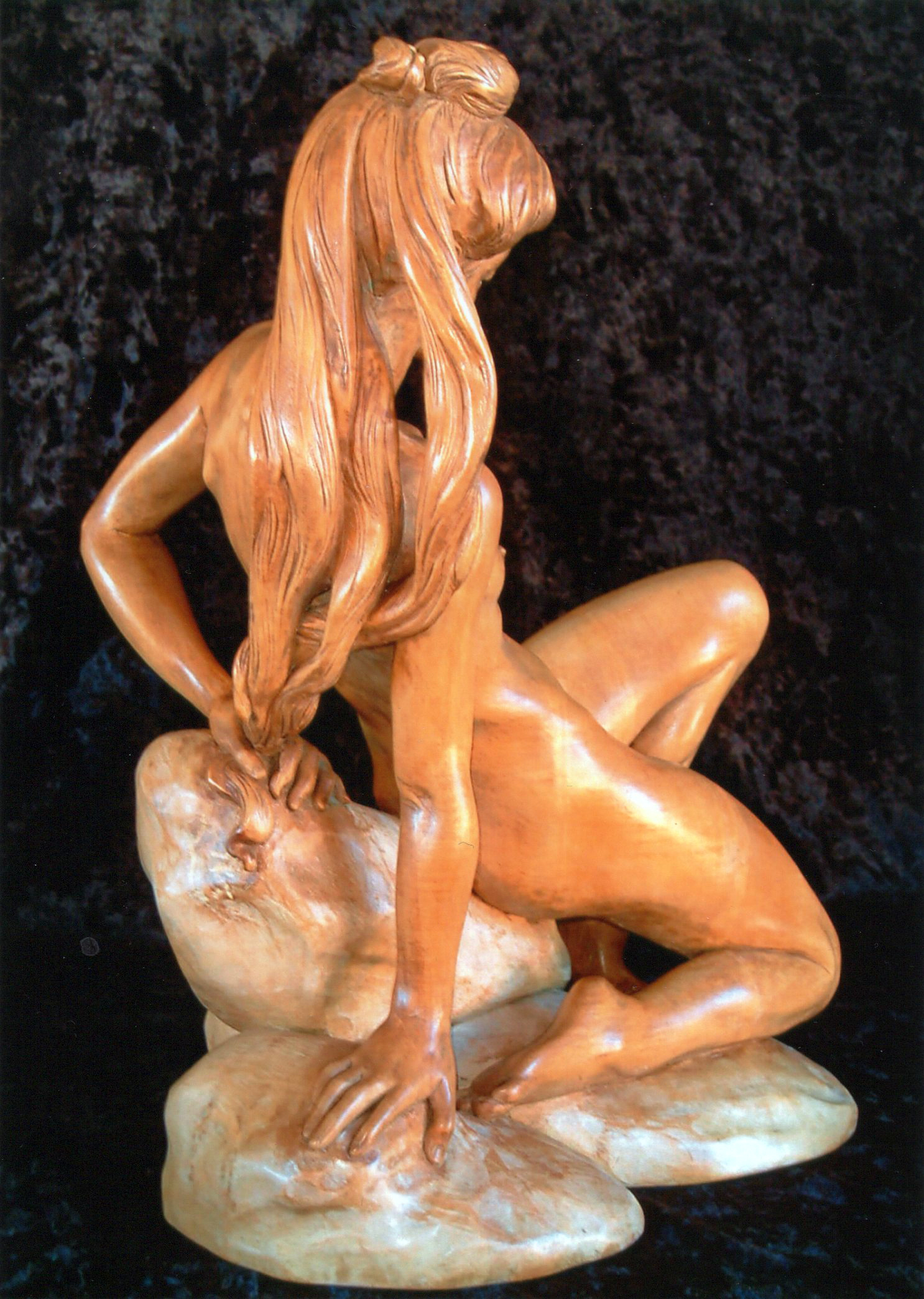
Amphitrite rear view
Lime wood
Sculptors collection

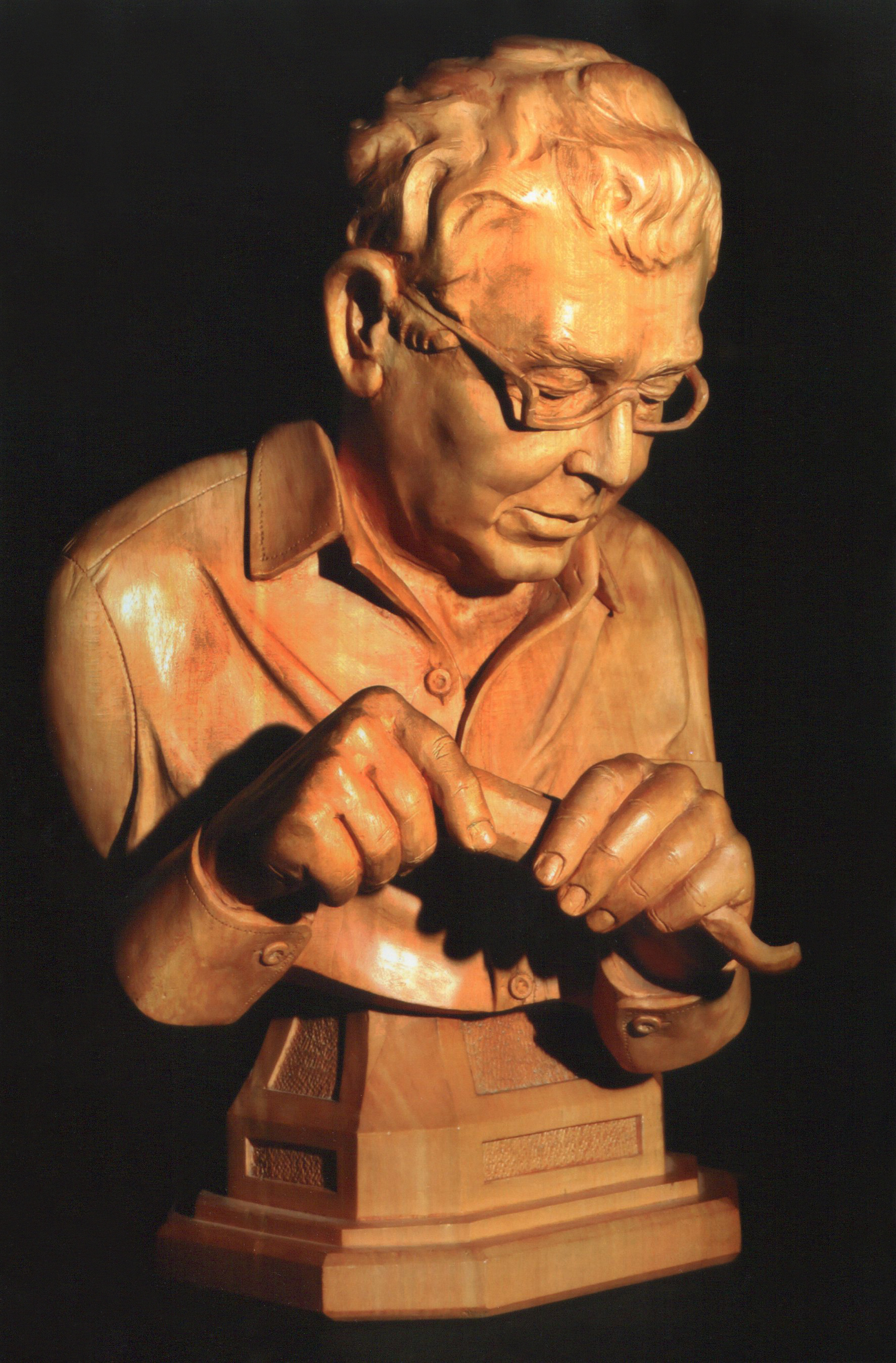
Denis Parsons self-portrait
Lime wood
Sculptors collection

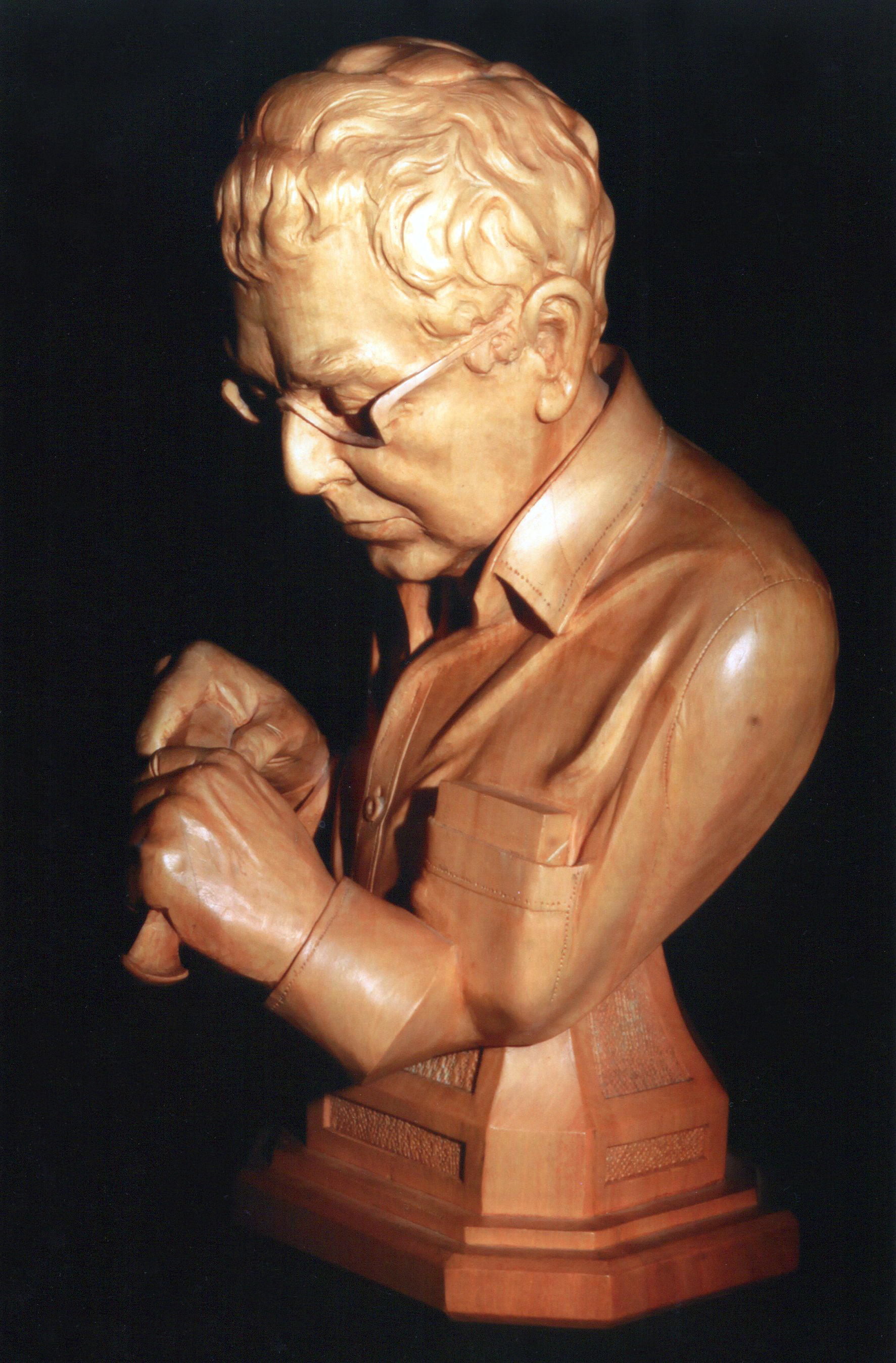
Denis Parsons self-portrait
Lime wood
Sculptors collection

== Selected works ==
Date	Work	Material	Location
1955c.	St Michael the Archangel	Oak	Unknown
1960c.	Canon Jenkins Workshop	Stone	Lichfield Cathedral, North West tower
1960c.	Coat of Arms – Pope John XXIII	Portland Stone	Unknown
1960c.	Wheatsheaf	Clipsham Stone	NFU, Stratford-upon-Avon
1960c.	Jean-Baptiste-Marie Chapaghat	Bay Wood	Ontario, Canada
1965c.	Crucifix	Teak	Coventry
1965c.	Christ in Glory	Lime Wood	Unknown
1965c.	St Nicholas of Myra, Turkey	Mahogany	St Nicholas C of E Church, Droitwich
1965c.	St Chad	Honduras Mahogany	Unknown
1967c.	Madonna and Child	Material unknown	Unknown
1969c.	St Leonard	Hollington Stone	Unknown
1969	Blue Coat Boy	Portland Stone	Blue Coat School, Walsall
1971	Rondel, Our Lady and St Peter Work in progress	Cotswod Stone	Prinknash Abbey, Cranham, Gloucester
1972	The Good Shepherd	Lime Wood	St Joseph's RC College, Stoke-on-Trent
1973	Sir Thomas More in workshop On site Close up	Mahogany	Thomas Moor RC School, Willenhall, Walsall
1973	Venerable Francis Leveson Rear view Close up	Mahogany	Thomas Moor RC School, Willenhall, Walsall
1973	St Nicholas Owen Work in progress	Lime Wood	St Joseph's RC Church, Darlaston, Wednesbury
1973c.	The 'Blessed' John Henry Cardinal Newman	Portland Stone	Unknown
1974	Yoga Figure	Resin	Sculptors Collection
1975	Processional Cross	Oak/Gilded	Christ Church Cathedral, Stanley, Falkland Islands
1976	St Catherine of Alexandria	Clipsham Stone	Church of St Mary the Virgin, Higham Ferrers, Northamptonshire
1978	St Thomas Becket	Clipsham Stone	Church of St Mary the Virgin, Higham Ferrers, Northamptonshire
1978	Archangel Raphael & Archangel Uriel Raphael being worked Uriel being worked Uriel completed	Portland Stone	North transept, Westminster Abbey
1978	Henry V & Catherine of Valois Carving Demonstration Catherine of Valois completed	Portland Stone	North transept, Westminster Abbey
1978	Triple Shell Fountain Workshop Close up Side Shells	Portland Stone	Abbots Ripton Hall, Huntingdonshire
1978	St Joseph and Child Christ Church	York stone	St Joseph's RC Church, Darlaston, West Midlands
1984	Talbot Hound	Grinsill stone	Alton Towers, Staffordshire
1985	Royal Achievement Coat of Arms	Pawsons York Stone	County Court Buildings, Burton-on-Trent
1985	Crucifix	Wood, Decorated and Gilded	St Agatha's Church, Llanymynech, Oswestry
1986	Crucifix In Workshop	Ash	Crypt Chapel, St Marylebone Parish Church, London
1986	Heraldic Symbols: Staff of Life – Lancaster Rose	Guiting Stone	Houses of Parliament, Riverside exterior
1986	Heraldic Symbols	Guiting Stone	Houses of Parliament, Riverside exterior
1989	Archangel Gabriel	Clipsham Stone	St Gabriels Church, Walsall
1990	Commemorative Tablet Work in progress	Welsh Blue Slate	St Osburg's RC Church, Coventry
1990	Dr Samuel Johnson Work in Progress Work in Progress RA Demonstration Completed figure front Completed figure rear	Burmese Teak	The Samuel Johnson Birthplace Museum, Lichfield
1991	Little Moreton Hall South elevation Original post Carving in workshop Carving in situ	English Green Oak	Little Moreton Hall, Cheshire
1991	Amphitrite Rear view Close up Blocking in 1 Blocking in 2 Finishing	Lime wood	Sculptors Private Collection
1992	Sir Edwin Lutyens Blocking in 1 Blocking in 2 Carving Demonstration	Bleached Brazilian mahogany	Private Collection
1992	St Dunstan	Lime wood	St Dunstans RC Church, Kings Heath, Birmingham
1993	Pope St Gregory the Great	Lime wood	St Gregory's RC Church, Stoke-on-Trent
1993	Trophy boxes Trophy Box Working drawing Grand Cross Star Centre panel Crown Grand Cross Star in situ	Oak	Order of the British Empire Chapel, St Paul's Cathedral, London
1994	Sir William Dugdale, 2nd Baronet In situ Profile Clay maquette	Bronze	Merevale Hall, Warwickshire
1994	Dean John Lang & Francis Lang Work in progress	Stone	Lichfield Cathedral
1995	St Ambrose Working drawing Rear view	Lime Wood	St Ambrose RC Church, Kidderminster
1996	Salacia – Queen of the Ocean In workshop	Lime Wood	Private Collection
1998	Erasmus Darwin relief Incised Paving Slabs	Stone	Erasmus Darwin House, Lichfield
1998	St Kenelm Working Drawing In Workshop	Lime Wood	Our Lady and St Kenelm RC Church, Halesowen, West Midlands
1998	A pair of white lions In workshop In situ	Cedar	White Lion Hotel, Banbury
1998	St Mary and Child Christ Work in progress Dedication	Lime Wood	St Mary's Hospital Chapel, London
1999	St Kenelm Working Drawing School visit	Lime Wood	Our Lady and St Kenelm RC School, Halesowen, West Midlands
2002	Denis Parsons self-portrait Side view	Lime wood	Sculptors collection
2003	Augustus Pugin Portrait Bust Side View Base Maquette	Japanese Oak	Private collection
2004	Blessed Virgin Mary and Child Christ 1, 2, 3	Bronze	Church of Our Lady, Merevale, Warwickshire
