= Bazalgette Mausoleum =

Mausoleum in Wimbledon, London

Coordinates: 51°25′43″N 0°12′37″W

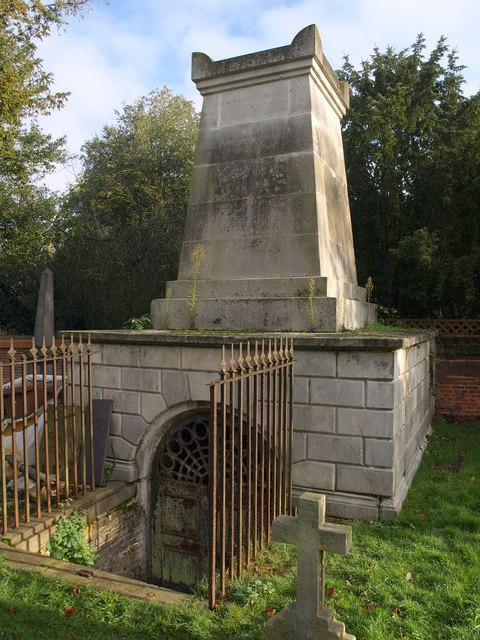
Sir Joseph Bazalgette's Mausoleum, St Mary's Church, Wimbledon

The Sir Joseph Bazalgette Mausoleum is a Grade II listed structure currently on Historic England’s Heritage-at-Risk Register. It stands in the grounds of St Mary's Church, Wimbledon, in the London Borough of Merton. The mausoleum is the final resting place of the noted Victorian engineer Sir Joseph Bazalgette and many members of his family.

It was built circa 1804 for John Anthony Rucker, a local merchant trader, businessman and slave-owner based at West Hill House, East Putney. Bazalgette acquired the mausoleum for his family towards the end of the 19th century as the churchyard was full.

== Architecture ==
The mausoleum is in a neo-classical style made of Portland stone. It consists of a rusticated base with decorated archway to the vault which has space for nine coffins. An obelisk sits atop the base, stating the names of the Bazalgette family interred there. It is believed the obelisk was an addition by Sir Joseph Bazalgette.

The mausoleum was built by Jesse Gibson, an architect based in Hackney, for John Anthony Rucker who died in 1804. Gibson was based in the City of London and is known for having rebuilt the now demolished St Peter le Poer in Broad Street, Vintner’s Company almshouses on Mile End Road and Saddlers Hall in Cheapside. Gibson also built West Hill House, in East Putney, for John Anthony Rucker (now the Royal Hospital for Neuro-Disability).

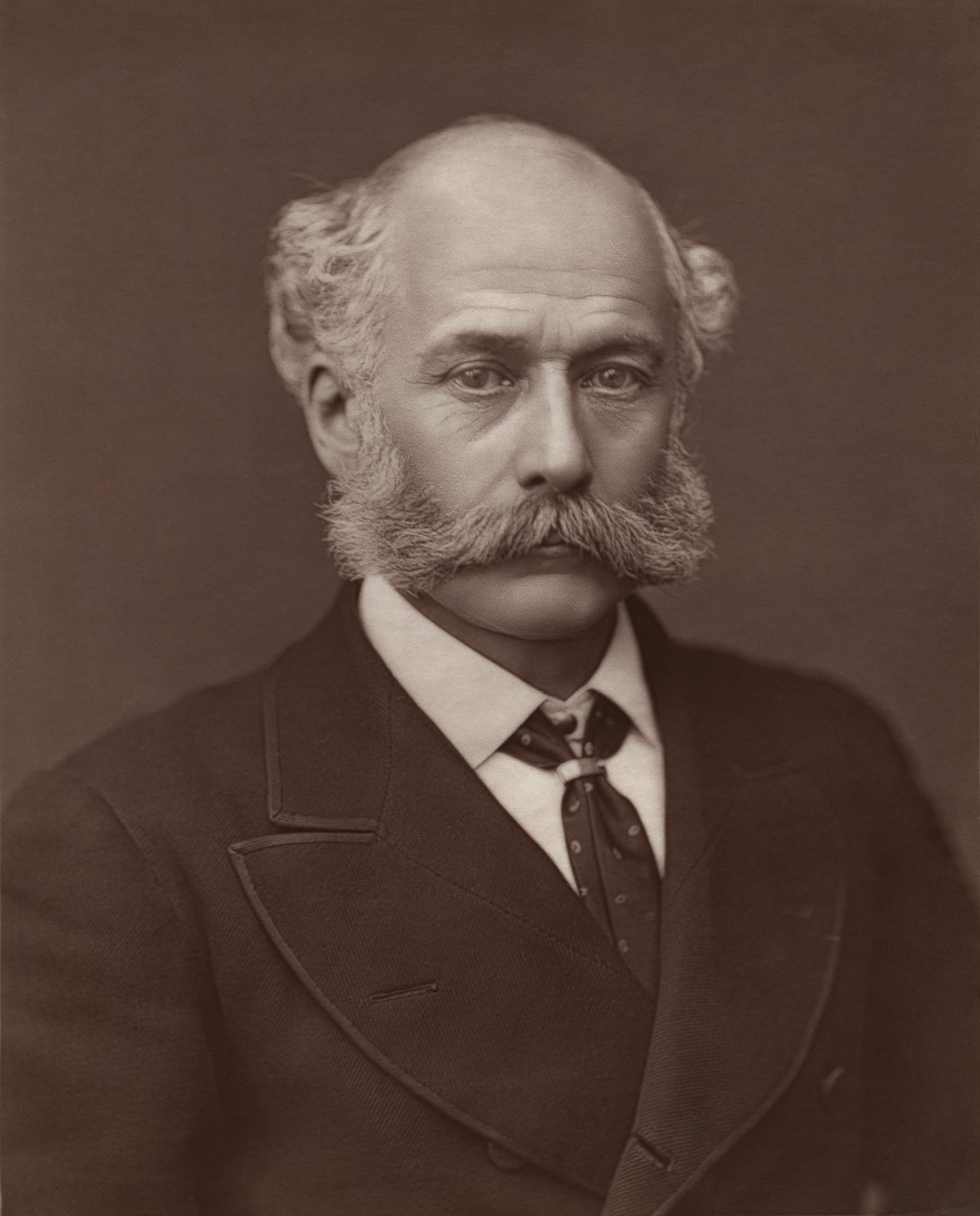
Sir Joseph Bazalgette

== Sir Joseph Bazalgette ==
Sir Joseph Bazalgette (1819-1891) was an eminent engineer, known for large infrastructural improvement that improved the sanitation of Victorian London. As the Chief Engineer for the Metropolitan Board of Works from 1856, Bazalgette was responsible for resolving the ‘Great Stink’ of 1858. His sewerage system helped to rid London of pollution and waterborne diseases such as cholera and typhoid. Crossness and Abbey Mills Pumping Stations were created as part of these designs.

Bazalgette created several bridges across the Thames, and designed the Victoria, Albert and Chelsea embankments. A memorial to Bazalgette by George Blackall Simonds is located on the Victoria Embankment, by the Hungerford Bridge.

Sir Joseph Bazalgette died on 15 March 1891. He is interred in the mausoleum alongside his wife Maria and five of their children.

== John Anthony Rucker ==
Joseph Anthony Rucker was a merchant originally from Hamburg. He bought property in South London including the West Hill estate and the Wandle Villa in the late eighteenth century. He owned slave estates in Grenada, Curacao and St Vincent, and was a witness for the 1789-90 Committee on the Slave Trade. Rucker’s estates and property were inherited by his nephew, Daniel Henry Rucker.

When Sir Joseph Bazalgette bought the mausoleum for his family towards the end of the 19th century, the tomb had been unattended for 84 years.

== Heritage ==
The mausoleum has been placed on Historic England’s Heritage-at-Risk Register due to internal collapse due to water ingress. The iron gates in front of the steps leading down to the vault are also missing.

As of 2023, Habitats & Heritage, a south-west London based charity, are currently working with the church to restore the mausoleum.
