= St Leonard's Court =

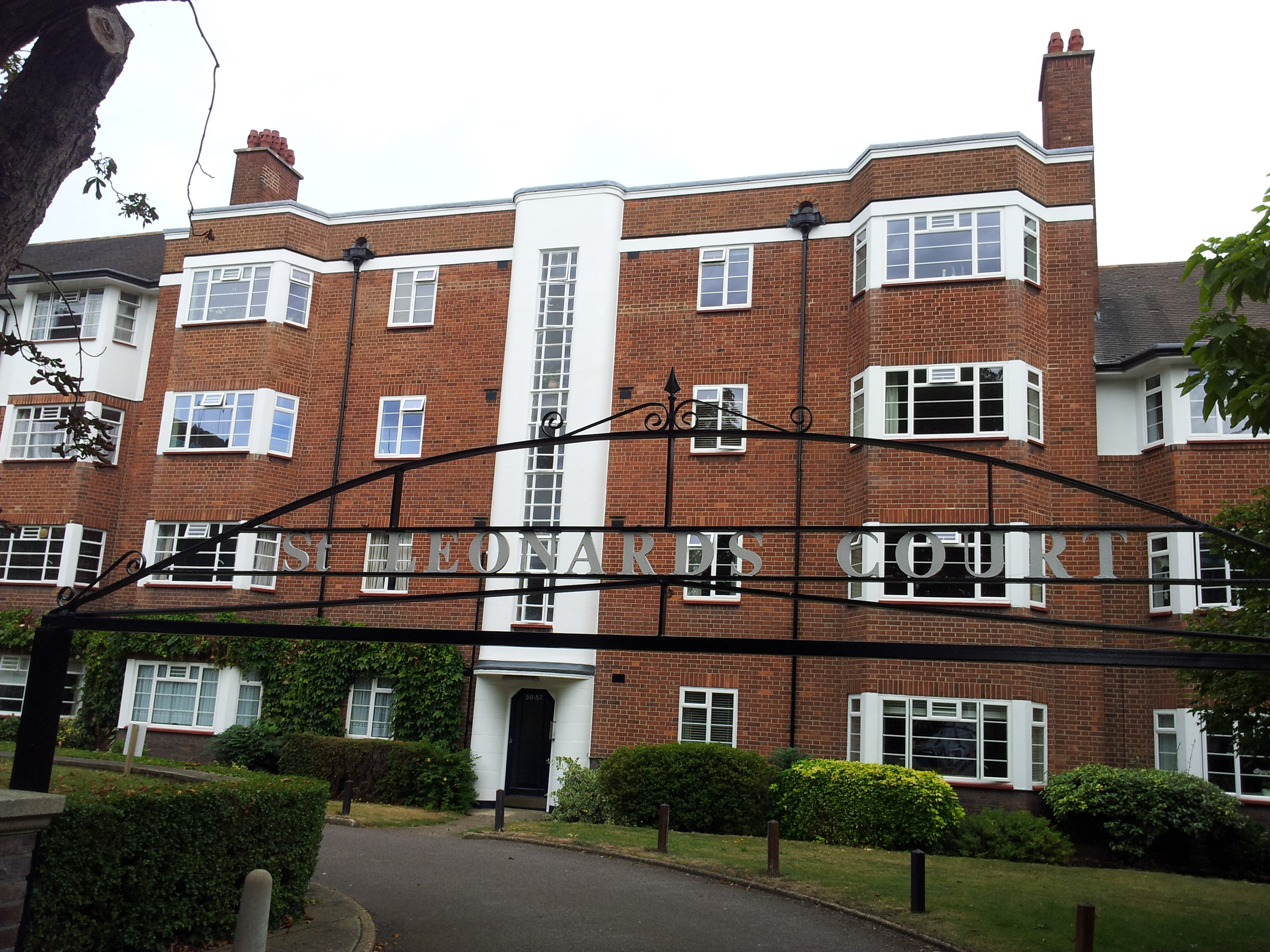

General information
- Type: Residential block of flats
- Location: Palmers Road, London SW14 7NG, East Sheen, London Borough of Richmond upon Thames, England
- Coordinates: 51°28′02″N 0°16′11″W
- Construction started: 1934
- Completed: 1938

Design and construction
- Architect: F G Fox

Air raid shelter at St Leonard's Court
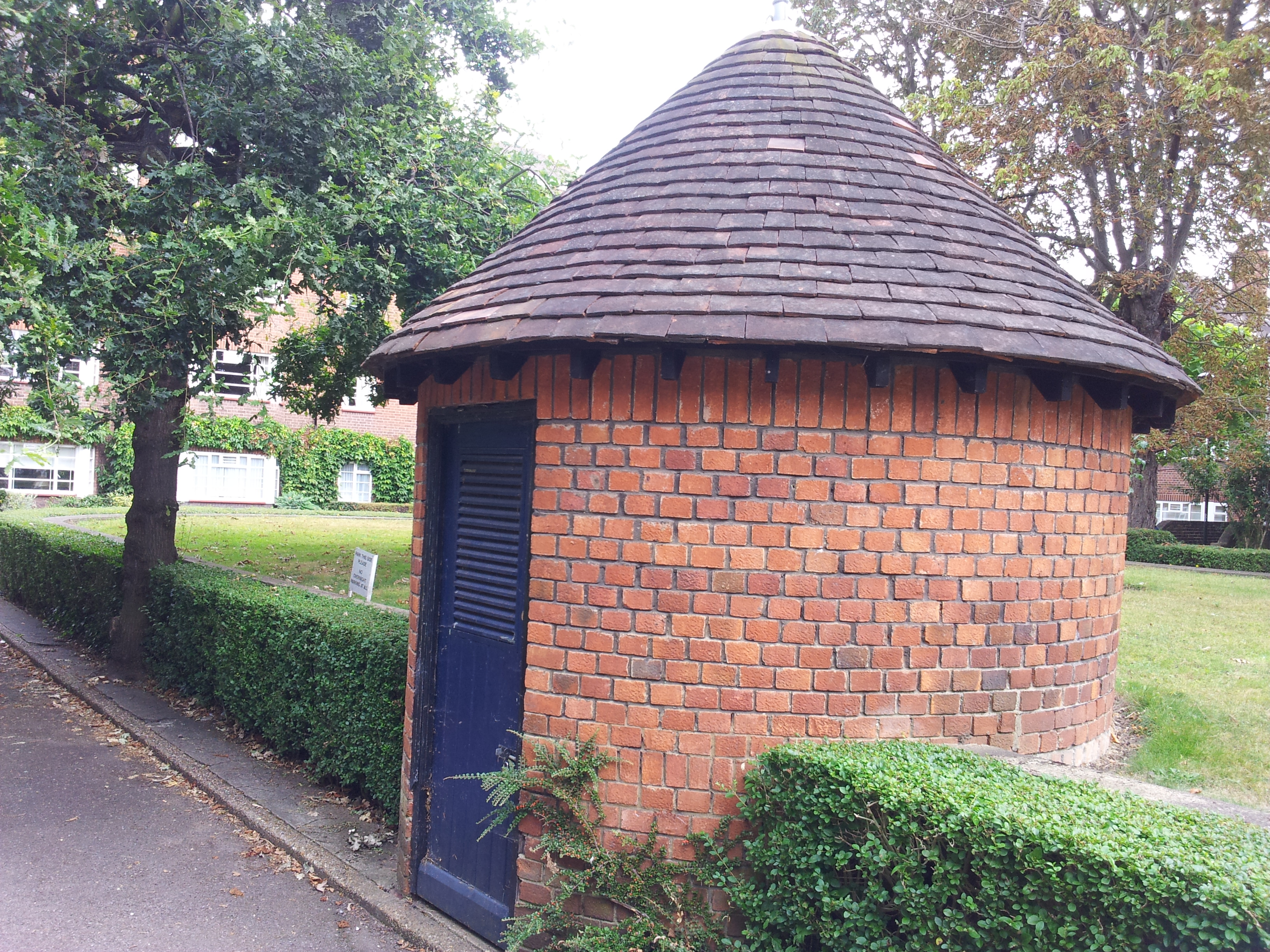
- Entrance to the air raid shelter
- Interactive map of Air raid shelter at St Leonard's Court
- Location: East Sheen (London Borough of Richmond upon Thames), London SW14 7NG, England

History
- Built: 1938–1941

Site notes
- Restored: ongoing
- Restored by: The Environment Trust; Mortlake with East Sheen Society; Barnes and Mortlake History Society, St Leonard’s Court Residents Association and Richmond upon Thames London Borough Council

Listed Building – Grade II
- Official name: Air Raid Shelter
- Designated: 29 October 2010
- Reference no.: 1395422

St Leonard's Court is a four-storey block of flats on Palmers Road, off St Leonard's Road in East Sheen, London SW14 in the London Borough of Richmond upon Thames, 0.2 miles from Mortlake railway station. It was constructed between 1934 and 1938 and is remarkable for its surviving underground air raid shelter, built in anticipation of the Second World War and now Grade II listed.

== Air raid shelter ==
The shelter is beneath the raised central courtyard in front of the flats, under a grass lawn which is surrounded by a hedge. The entrance, above ground, is via a brick conical turret which has a tiled roof. Steps lead down from inside the turret to the shelter below.

The shelter was designed to hold 48 people and, according to Habitats & Heritage, was built in 1938 and extended in 1941. It has four rooms (two for men and two for women, separated by a central corridor) and a particularly well-preserved interior with some original fittings. According to Historic England, it has some similarities to W. Braxton Sinclair's design of a sophisticated air raid shelter for flats at Queen's Gate, in South Kensington, London, which was published in The Builder in October 1938.

In 2007 Richmond upon Thames London Borough Council rejected a planning application, which had been opposed by local residents and councillors, to convert the shelter into two self-contained apartments. The Council's decision was upheld in 2008 on appeal.

In 2010 Historic England listed the shelter at Grade II and since then has identified it as a building at risk, in poor condition. Habitats & Heritage is working with other local organisations (Mortlake with East Sheen Society, Barnes and Mortlake History Society, St Leonard’s Court Residents Association and Richmond Borough Council) to conserve the building for the benefit of the community and for use as an educational resource. An interpretation board was installed in 2014.

== See also ==
- Air-raid shelter
- Heritage at Risk
- London deep-level shelters
- Subterranean London
