= Hospital for Incurables =

Hospital for Incurables may refer to:

- Ospedale degli Incurabili, the Neapolitan Hospital for Incurables
- Royal Edinburgh Hospital for Incurables
- Royal Hospital, Donnybrook
- Royal Hospital for Incurables
- Royal Hospital for Neuro-disability
- Hospital for Incurables (New York City) on Roosevelt Island
