= Our Lady Queen of Peace Church, Richmond =

Church in Richmond, England

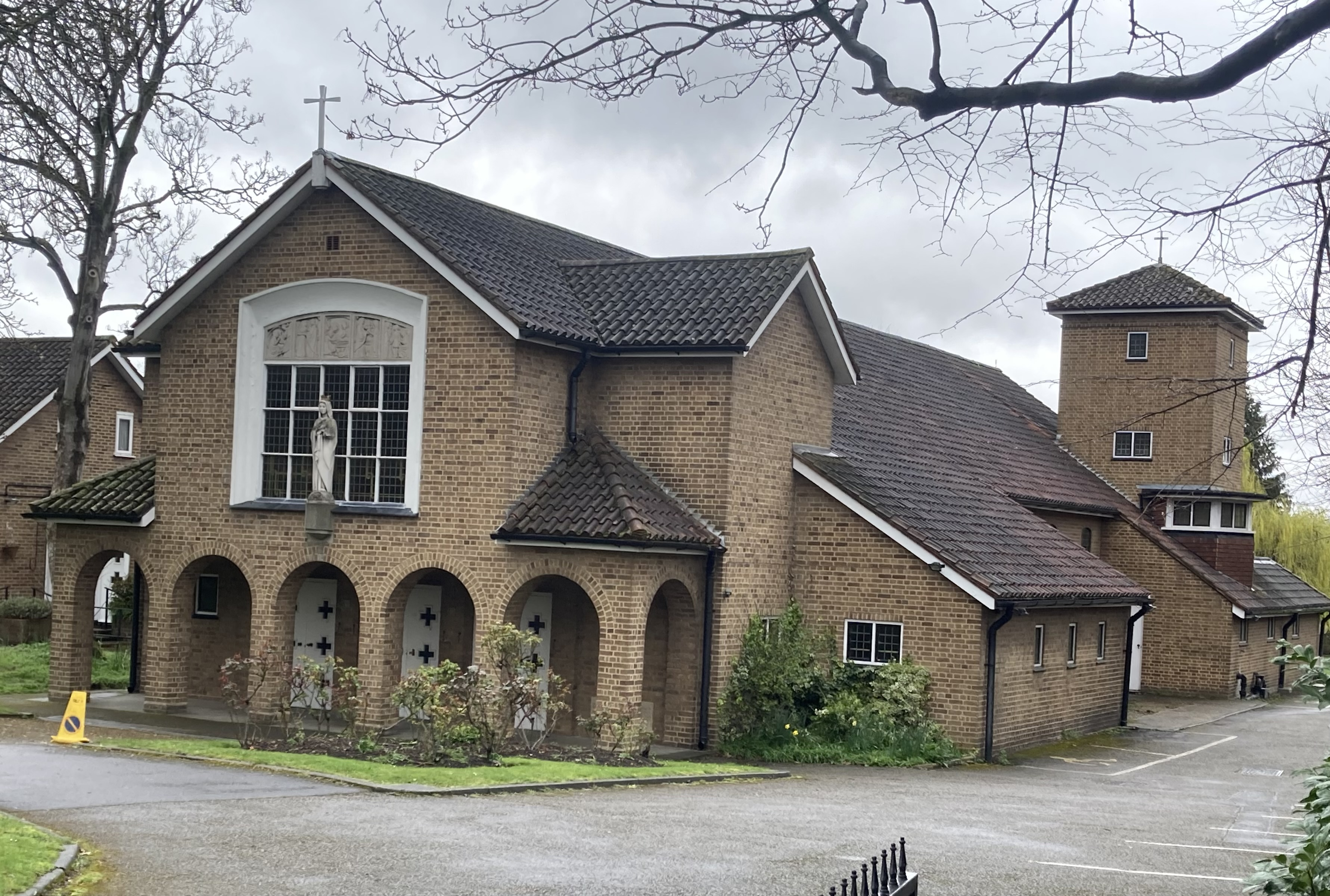
- Our Lady Queen of Peace Church, Richmond
- 51°27′44.8″N 0°17′6.7″W
- OS grid reference: TQ 19221 75113
- Location: 222 Sheen Road, Richmond TW10 5AN
- Country: England
- Denomination: Roman Catholic
- Website: www.olqp.info

History
- Founded: November 1953
- Dedicated: June 1971

Architecture
- Architect: Frank Broadbent of Goodhart-Rendel, Broadbent & Curtis
- Years built: 1953–54

Administration
- Diocese: Roman Catholic Archdiocese of Southwark
- Deanery: Mortlake
- Parish: East Sheen

Clergy
- Priest: Monsignor William Saunders

Our Lady Queen of Peace Church, Richmond is a Roman Catholic church in Sheen Road, Richmond, London. It serves the East Sheen parish in the Roman Catholic Archdiocese of Southwark and, as it is close to Richmond's boundary with East Sheen, is often known as Our Lady Queen of Peace Church, East Sheen.

It was the first church to be designed by architect F G (Frank) Broadbent (1909–1983) (of Goodhart-Rendel, Broadbent and Curtis).

The foundation stone was laid in November 1953 by the Rt Reverend Monsignor Cyril Cowderoy, Roman Catholic Bishop of Southwark. The church opened on 9 May 1954 and was expanded in 1963. The consecration, by Archbishop Cyril Cowderoy, did not take place until June 1971. A new parish hall was built in 1992.

The church became a parish in its own right in 1959. Its priest is Monsignor William Saunders.
