= Frank Broadbent =

English architect

Francis George Broadbent
- Born: 27 August 1909; Fulham, London, England
- Died: 13 January 1983 (aged 73); Wandsworth, London, England
- Occupation: Architect
- Practice: Goodhart-Rendel Broadbent & Curtis

Francis George Broadbent (27 August 1909 – 13 January 1983) was a 20th-century English architect known for his work in designing churches and schools for the Roman Catholic Church. He was educated at Mount St. Mary's College in Derbyshire and throughout his life maintained close connections with the school, both as an Old Mountaineer and as the college's architect.

== Career ==
Broadbent studied at the Northern Polytechnic School of Architecture and worked in Sir Herbert Baker's office on drawings for the Bank of England. He joined H.S. Goodhart-Rendel as senior assistant in 1936, becoming an Associate of the Royal Institute of British Architects in 1938, and a Fellow in 1948. He became a partner in the architectural firm Goodhart-Rendel Broadbent & Curtis in 1947, working initially on war damage repairs and designing a number of private houses. He took over the practice when Harry Stuart Goodhart-Rendel died. Subsequently, he became senior partner in Broadbent Hastings Reid & New, retiring in 1980.

He saw military service during WW2, joining The Royal Engineers in 1939 and working on camouflage for Southern Command. He returned to architectural practice in 1945 having gained the rank of Major.

Frank was Consultant Architect to Southwark Cathedral and was created a Knight of the Holy Sepulchre for his work for the Diocese. He was made a Knight of St. Gregory for his work at Prinknash Abbey.

== Works ==
Broadbent completed the restoration work on Prinknash Abbey, which had been started by Goodhart-Rendel in 1939. He also restored the Tyburn convent (1962). He worked, from 1959 to 1960, with Goodhart-Rendel on the design and construction of St Martin and St Ninian Catholic Church in Whithorn, Wigtownshire, Scotland.

The churches he designed include:

- Our Lady Queen of Peace Church, Richmond, London (1953–54)
- The Church of the Holy Name, Esher (1960)
- St Ann's, Kingston Hill (1960)
- St Thomas More, Knebworth (1961)
- The Holy Name, Claygate (1961)
- St John Fisher, Cannon Hill Lane, Merton (1962)
- St John the Evangelist, Tadworth (1966)
- The Holy Spirit, Fetcham
- St Pius X, New Malden
- St Theodore, Cranbrook
- Our Lady of Dover, Buckland (1960s)

== Personal life ==
Broadbent lived at 71 Christchurch Road, East Sheen. with his wife Ena Broadbent. They had three children.

He is the great-grandson of Liverpool architect, John Broadbent (1803–1842), whose most important works included the churches of St. Augustine, Shaw Street, St. Anthony's on the Scotland Road and the tower of St. Mary's, Walton-on-the-Hill.

== Death and legacy ==
Broadbent died on 13 January 1983, aged 73.

His correspondence with Harry Stuart Goodhart-Rendel from 1941 to 1959 is held by the Royal Institute of British Architects in its Archives and Drawings Collection.
