= Parkside Christian Centre, East Sheen =

Pentecostal church in London, England

- Parkside Christian Centre, East Sheen
- 51°27′53.9″N 0°15′30.6″W
- Location: 173 Upper Richmond Road (West), East Sheen, London SW14 8DU
- Country: England
- Denomination: Pentecostal
- Website: Parkside Christian Centre

History
- Status: Active

Clergy
- Pastor: No pastor at the moment

Parkside Christian Centre, East Sheen, previously known as Elim Pentecostal Church, East Sheen, is a Pentecostal church in the London Borough of Richmond upon Thames at 173 Upper Richmond Road (West), in East Sheen.

== See also ==
- Elim Pentecostal Church
