= East Sheen =

Suburb of London in the London Borough of Richmond upon Thames

Coordinates: 51.464°N 0.266°W

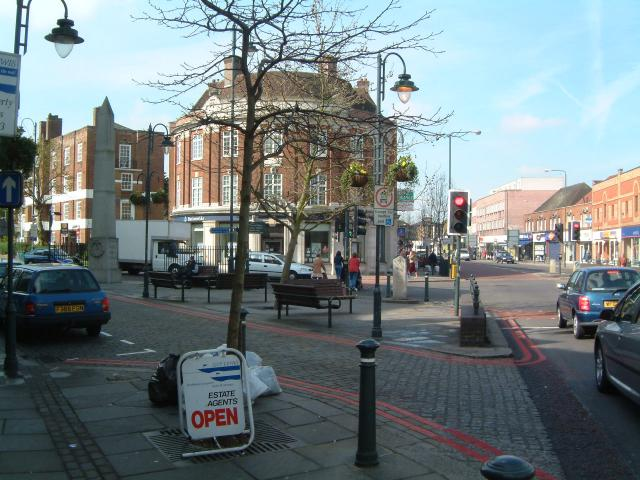
- The Triangle and Upper Richmond Road

- Location within Greater London
- Area: 5.84 km^{2} (2.25 sq mi)
- Population: 10,348 (East Sheen ward 2011)
  - Density: 1,772/km^{2} (4,590/sq mi)
- OS grid reference: TQ205753
- London borough: Richmond
- Ceremonial county: Greater London
- Region: London
- Country: England
- Sovereign state: United Kingdom
- Post town: LONDON
- Postcode district: SW14
- Dialling code: 020
- Police: Metropolitan
- Fire: London
- Ambulance: London
- UK Parliament: Richmond Park
- London Assembly: South West

East Sheen, also known as Sheen, is a suburb in south-west London in the London Borough of Richmond upon Thames.

Its long high street has shops, offices, restaurants, cafés, pubs and suburban supermarkets and is also the economic hub for Mortlake of which East Sheen was once a manor. This commercial thoroughfare, well served by public transport, is the Upper Richmond Road West which connects Richmond to Putney. Central to this street is The Triangle, a traffic island with a war memorial and an old milestone dating from 1751, marking the 10 miles (16 km) distance to Cornhill in the City of London.

The main railway station serving the area, Mortlake, is centred 300 metres (980 ft) north of this. Sheen has a mixture of low-rise and mid-rise buildings and it has parks and open spaces including its share of Richmond Park, accessed via Sheen Gate; Palewell Common, which has a playground, playing fields, tennis courts and a pitch and putt course; and East Sheen Common which is owned by the National Trust and leads into Bog Gate, another gate of Richmond Park.

Sheen Lane runs south from the junction of Mortlake High Street and Lower Richmond Road, over the level crossing at Mortlake station and the crossroads at Upper Richmond Road West, and up the hill to East Sheen Gate.

== Etymology ==
The earliest recorded use of the name is c. 950 as Sceon, meaning "shed" or "shelters". The area was designated separately from Sheen (an earlier name for Richmond) from the 13th century, as the southern manor of Mortlake.

== Local politics ==
East Sheen is in the Richmond Park constituency. The Member of Parliament is Sarah Olney of the Liberal Democrats.

East Sheen Ward borders the railway at Mortlake station, and includes a large slice of Richmond Park, extending south to Robin Hood Gate by the A3 road. Every four years, residents elect three councillors to Richmond upon Thames Council. East Sheen was traditionally a safe Conservative ward, but the Liberal Democrats won all three of the ward's seats on the Council in 2022 and again in 2026.

== History ==
=== Manor and hamlet status ===
East Sheen was a hamlet in the parish of Mortlake:

East-Sheen is a pleasant hamlet in this parish, situated on a rising ground considerably above the level of the river. It contains about ninety houses. Here are several handsome villas; the vicinity to Richmond-park, and the beauty of the surrounding country, making it a desirable situation.

— 'Mortlake', The Environs of London 1792, Daniel Lysons

Earliest references specifically to the present area of land, rather than references to parts of Mortlake, emerge in the 13th century, generally under its early name of Westhall. Originally one carucate, it was sold in 1473 by Michael Gaynsford and Margaret his wife in the right of Margaret to William Welbeck, citizen and haberdasher, of London. The Welbecks held it until selling in 1587. Later owners of what remained, the Whitfields, Juxons and Taylors were equally not titled, as with Mortlake's manorial owners, nor had an above average size or lavish manor house.

=== Development of the Temple Grove, Palmerston country estate ===
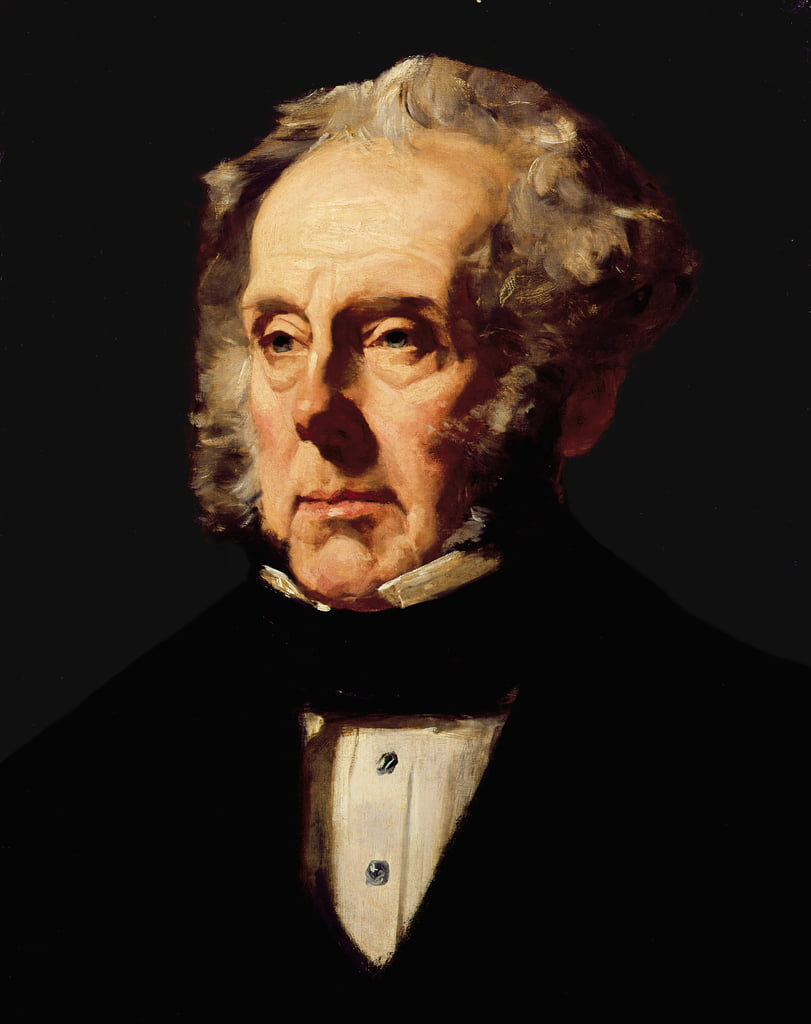
Prime Minister Henry Temple, 3rd Viscount Palmerston sold the southern purported manor to private developers as a young man.

The southern estate of Temple Grove, East Sheen, first belonged to Sir Abraham Cullen, who was created a baronet in 1661. He died in 1668, and his first son Sir John in 1677. His second son Sir Rushout Cullen seems to have sold the estate shortly afterwards to Sir John Temple, attorney-general of Ireland, brother to Sir William Temple, diplomat and author, who was earlier of adjoining West Sheen, giving the home his name. It belonged to the Temples until Henry Temple, 3rd Viscount Palmerston, who later would serve as Foreign Secretary and Prime Minister, sold it soon after coming of age in 1805. It was bought by Sir Thomas Bernard, who rebuilt the Jacobean style front of the house shown in a drawing hung in the house of 1611. Sir Thomas sold it about 1811 to Rev. William Pearson who founded the Temple Grove Preparatory School for boys. The school moved in 1907 to Eastbourne and the estate was given over to house and apartment builders.

=== Administration ===
East Sheen was included in the Metropolitan Police District in 1840. Before 1900, Mortlake developed a secular vestry to help administer poor relief, maintain roads, ditches and other affairs. From 1892 to 1894 Mortlake (including East Sheen) formed part of the expanded Municipal Borough of Richmond. In 1894, nearby North Sheen was created as a civil parish, being split off from Mortlake and remaining in the Municipal Borough of Richmond. The remainder of Mortlake (including East Sheen) was instead transferred to the Barnes Urban District, which became the Municipal Borough of Barnes in 1932.

In 1965 North Sheen was incorporated into Kew which, with the rest of the Municipal Borough of Richmond, joined the Municipal Borough of Twickenham and the Municipal Borough of Barnes to form the London Borough of Richmond upon Thames.

== Economy ==
East Sheen concentrates its commercial area to the main through street: its long high street has transport/furniture/hardware shops, convenience services, offices, restaurants, cafés, pubs and suburban supermarkets and is also the economic hub for Mortlake of which East Sheen was once a manor. This wide-footpath street is the Upper Richmond Road West which connects Richmond to Putney. Central to this street is The Triangle, a tree-lined traffic island with a war memorial and an old milestone at the intersection of Upper Richmond Road West with Sheen Lane. The main railway station serving the area, Mortlake, is centred 300m north of this.

== Churches ==
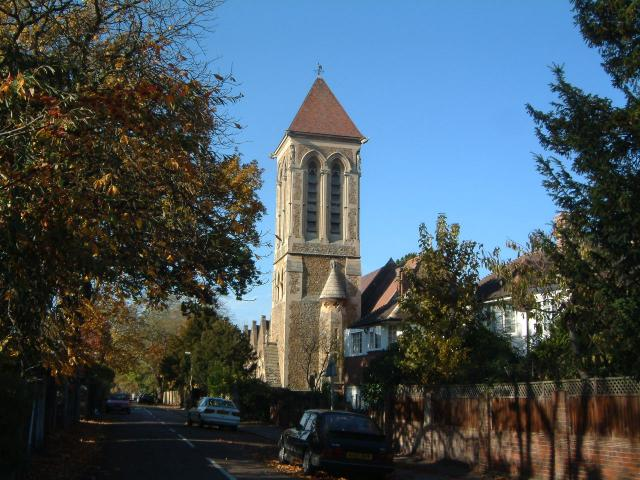
Christ Church, East Sheen

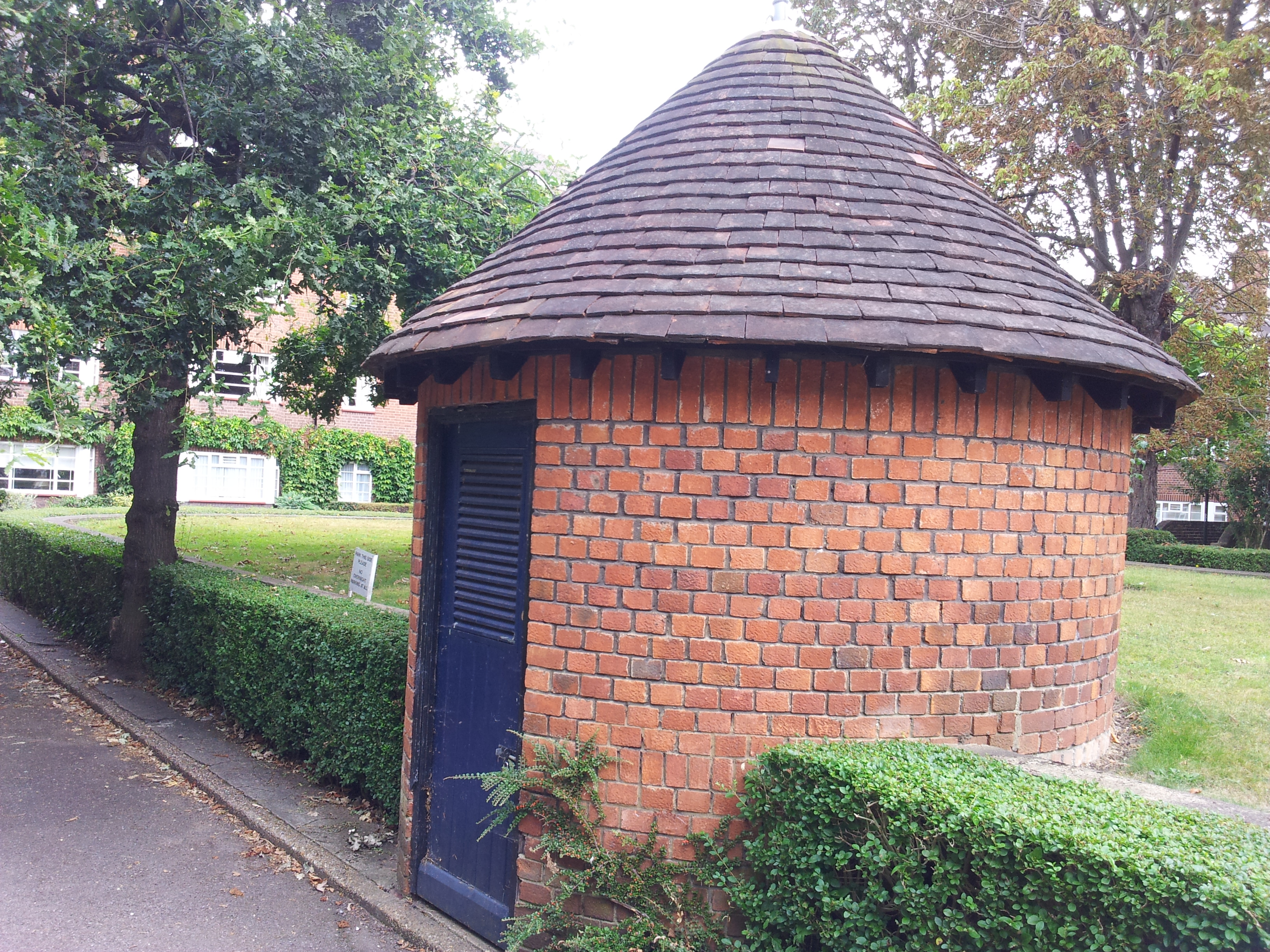
Entrance to air-raid shelter at St Leonard's Court

East Sheen lies in the ecclesiastical parish of Mortlake with East Sheen. In addition to the Parish Church of St Mary the Virgin the district has two daughter churches: Christ Church, and All Saints. Christ Church, situated near the crossroads of Christchurch Road and West Temple Sheen, was built by Arthur Blomfield on land formerly part of a farm at the entrance to Sheen Common in the 1860s. It was originally planned to be opened in April 1863; however, the tower collapsed shortly before completion and had to be rebuilt. The church was finally completed and consecrated nine months later, on 13 January 1864.

All Saints was built on land bequeathed under the will of Major Shepherd-Cross, MP for Bolton who lived at nearby Palewell Lodge from 1896 until his death in 1913. The church was consecrated on All Saints' Day 1929, a year and two days after the foundation stone was laid by Elizabeth, Duchess of York (later Queen Elizabeth the Queen Mother).

East Sheen has two other churches: East Sheen Baptist Church and Parkside Christian Centre. It has no separate Roman Catholic church; the church of St Mary Magdalen Mortlake and Our Lady Queen of Peace Church, Richmond also serve East Sheen.

== Other notable features ==
There is a Grade II-listed air raid shelter, dating from before the Second World War, at St Leonard's Court, a block of flats on St Leonard's Road, near Mortlake railway station.

== Notable residents ==
=== Living people ===
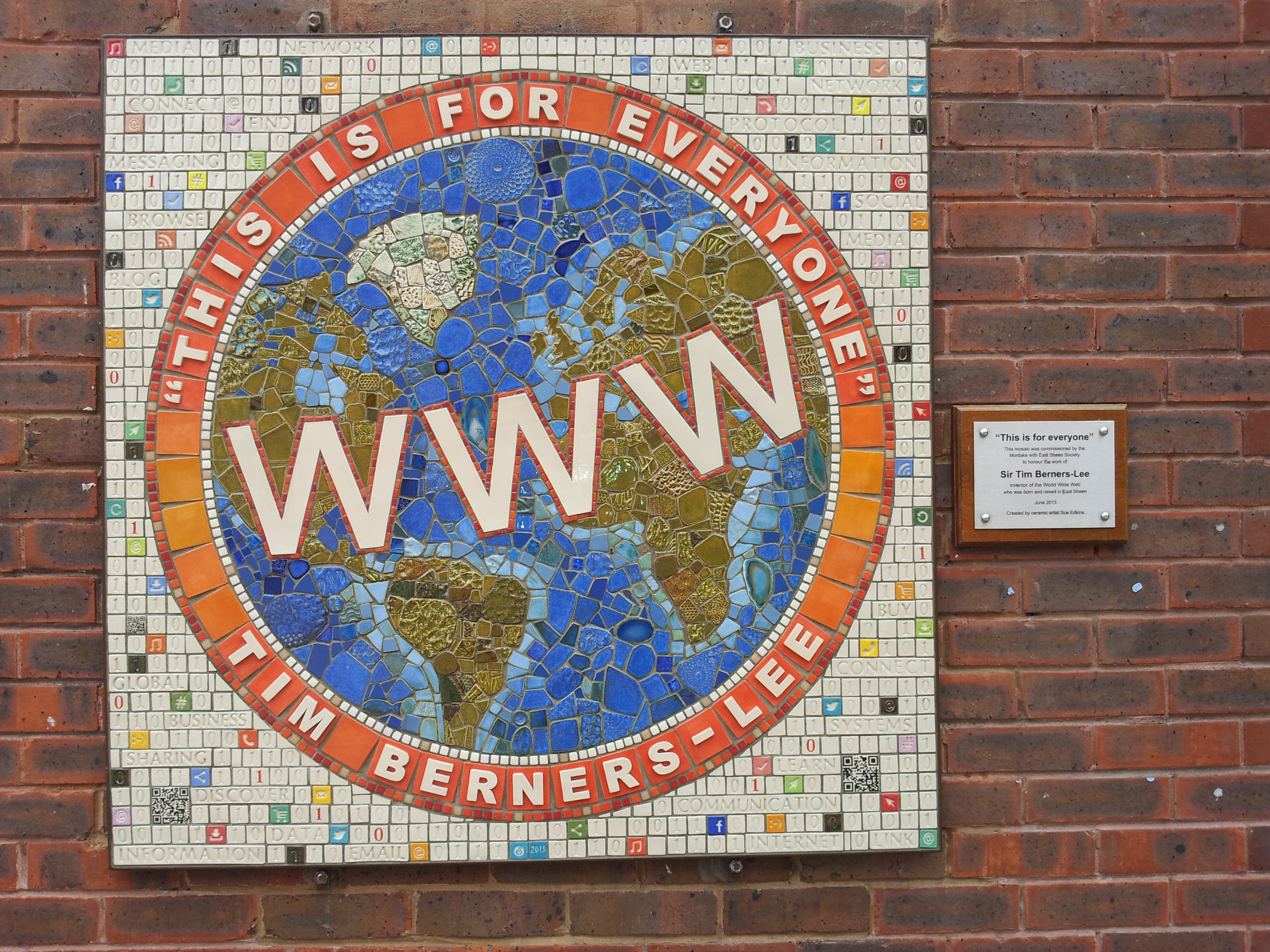
Mosaic by Sue Edkins at Sheen Lane Centre honouring Tim Berners-Lee

- Sir Tim Berners-Lee (born 1955), computer scientist and inventor of the World Wide Web, grew up in East Sheen and attended Sheen Mount Primary School. A mosaic by Sue Edkins was placed at Sheen Lane Centre in June 2013 to commemorate his association with East Sheen.
- Carol Cleveland (born 1942), actress and comedian, who worked with Monty Python, was born in East Sheen.
- Abigail Cruttenden (born 1968), actress, lives in East Sheen.
- Omid Djalili (born 1965), actor and comedian, lives in East Sheen.
- David Gandy (born 1980), model, lives in East Sheen.
- Philip Glenister (born 1963), and Beth Goddard (born 1969), actors, live in East Sheen.
- Tom Hardy (born 1977), actor, lives in East Sheen.
- Carrie Johnson (born 1988), conservationist and wife of Prime Minister Boris Johnson, was brought up in East Sheen.
- Andrew Marr (born 1959), political broadcaster, and Jackie Ashley (born 1954), political journalist, have lived in East Sheen.
- Sir Trevor McDonald (born 1939), broadcaster, lives in East Sheen.
- Steven Moffat (born 1961), television writer and producer, and his wife Sue Vertue (born 1960), television producer, live in East Sheen.
- Valerie Vaz (born 1954), politician and solicitor, Labour MP for Walsall and Bloxwich, was brought up in East Sheen.

=== Historical figures ===
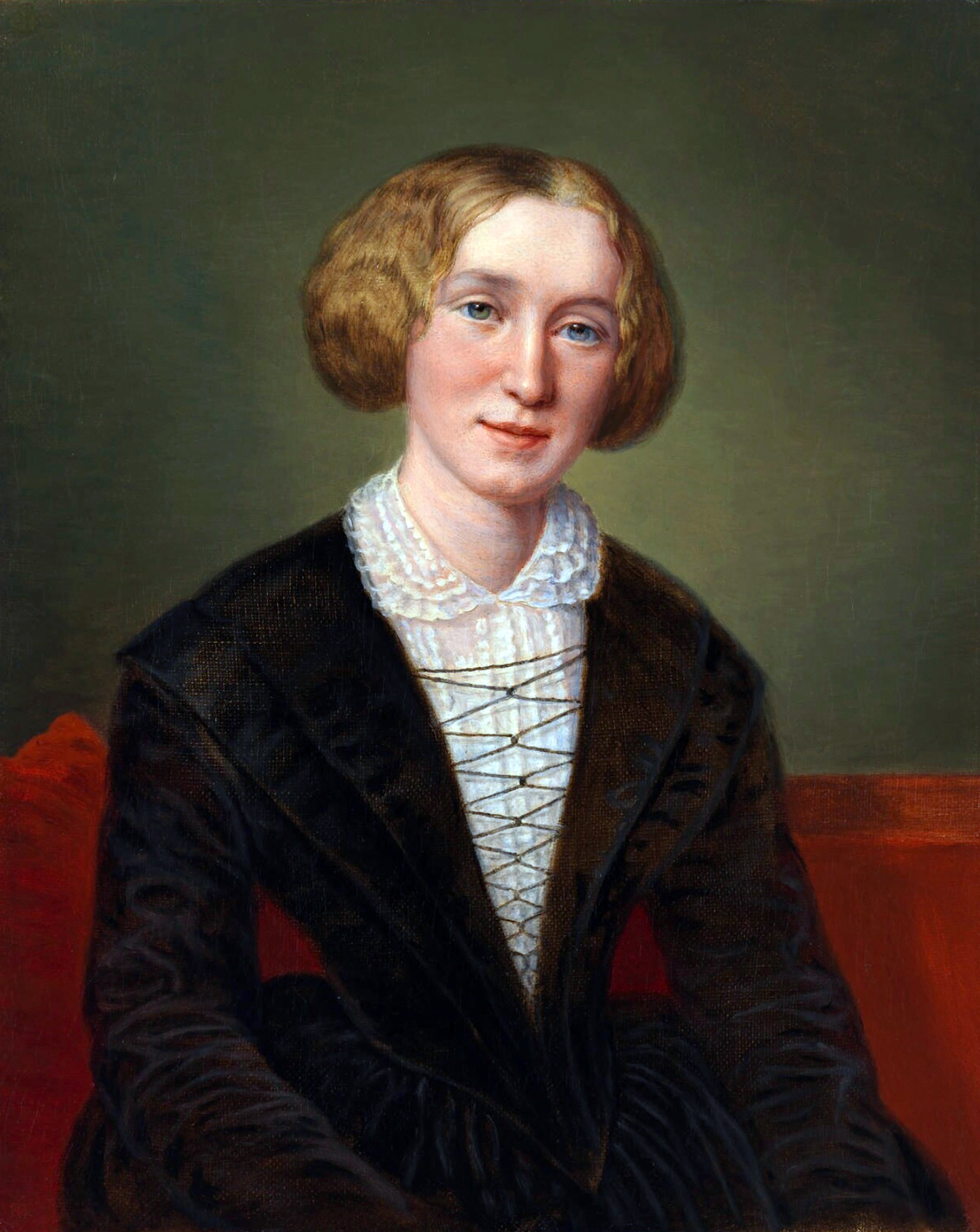
The novelist George Eliot lived in East Sheen in 1855.

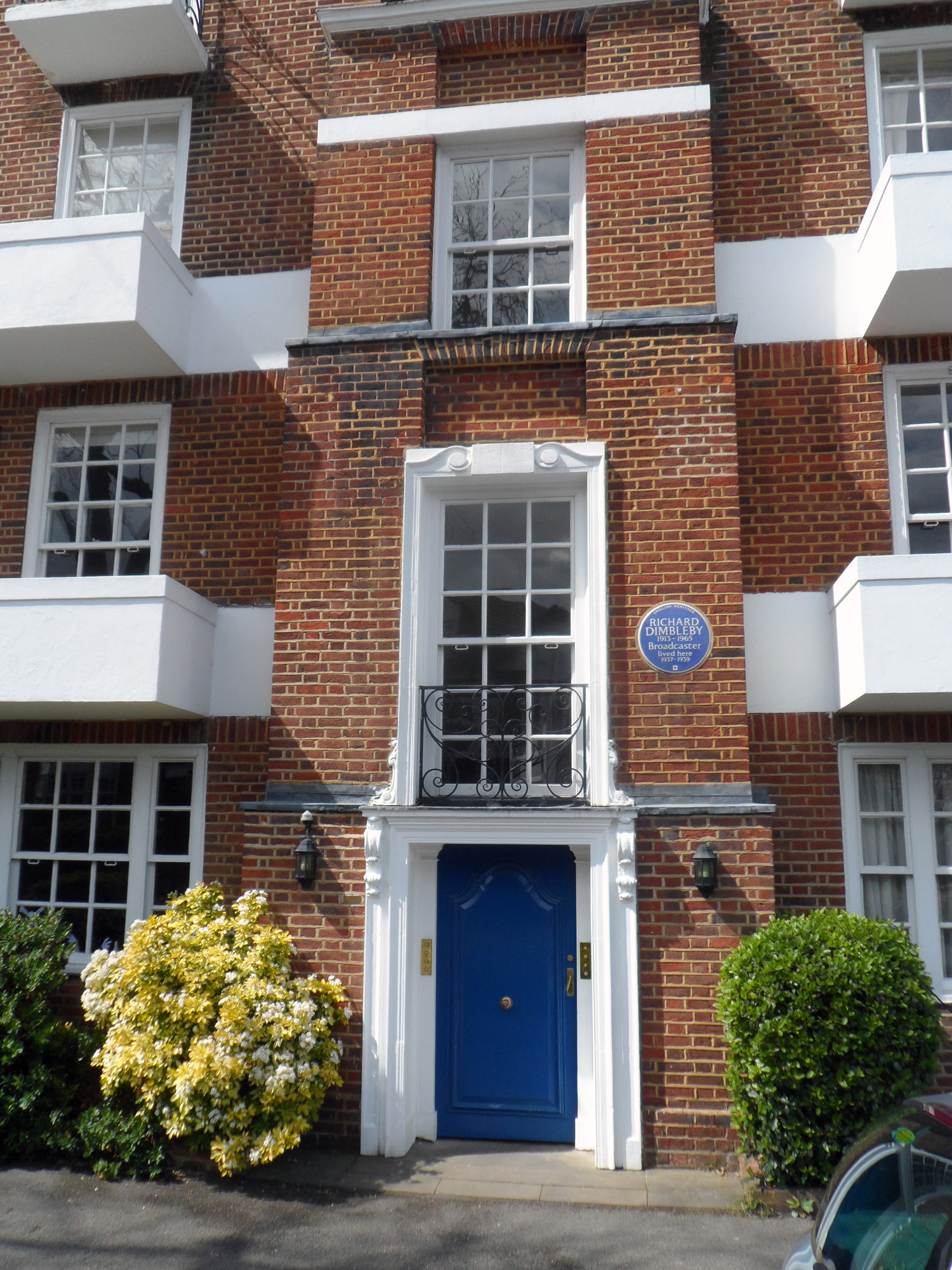
The broadcaster Richard Dimbleby lived in a flat at Cedar Court.

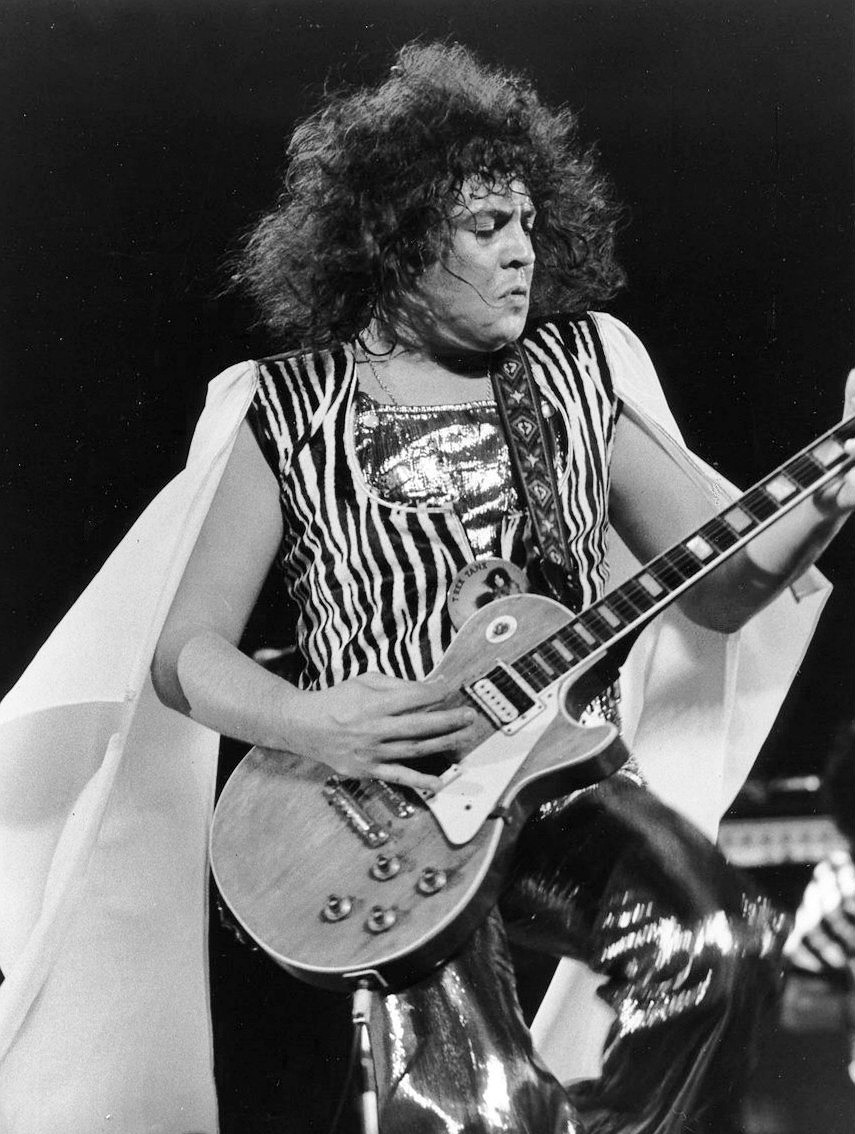
The rock musician Marc Bolan, pictured here in 1973, lived in East Sheen.

- John Partridge (1644–c.1714), astrologer, was born at East Sheen and apprenticed to a local shoemaker. He died in Mortlake and is buried there.
- Robert Shirley, 1st Earl Ferrers (1650–1717), peer and courtier, was born in East Sheen.
- Sir Charles Pole, 1st Baronet (1757–1830), Admiral of the Fleet, who married Henrietta Goddard, niece of Henry Hope of Sheen House, in 1792, lived at Sheen House from 1806 onwards.
- Charles Grey, 2nd Earl Grey (1764–1845), British Prime Minister from 1831 to 1834, rented Sheen House from the Marquess of Ailesbury during his premiership, for use as a country house near London.
- Robert Stewart, 2nd Marquess of Londonderry, usually known as Lord Castlereagh (1769–1822), British Foreign Secretary, rented Temple Grove, East Sheen, from Lord Palmerston's trustees, from 1802 to 1806. His wife's mother, the Countess of Buckinghamshire, lived next door, at The Firs.
- Joshua Bates (1788–1864), the Boston-born banker, had a villa in Sheen from 1841 to 1863.
- Edwin Chadwick (1800–1890), social reformer, died at Park Cottage, East Sheen.
- Sir Henry Parker (1808–1881), Premier of New South Wales, acquired Stawell House, East Sheen, on his return to England in 1868, and his family continued there until 1935.
- Thomas German Reed (1817–1888), composer, musical director, actor, singer and theatrical manager, died at St Croix, Upper East Sheen, and is buried at Old Mortlake Burial Ground. With his wife Priscilla Horton (1818–1895), he created the German Reed Entertainments.
- The novelist Mary Anne Evans, better known as George Eliot (1819–1880), took rooms at 7 Clarence Row, East Sheen (now demolished) from May to September 1855.
- Sir Arthur Blomfield (1829–1899), architect, one of whose early works was Christ Church, East Sheen, designed and lived in The Cottage, now divided into two as 53 and 55 Christ Church Road.
- Ralph Knott (1879–1929), architect of County Hall, the former London County Council building on the South Bank, Westminster, lived and died in East Sheen.
- Princess Alexandra, 2nd Duchess of Fife (1891–1959), granddaughter of King Edward VII and great-granddaughter of Queen Victoria, was born at East Sheen Lodge.
- Robert Watson-Watt (1892–1973), known as the 'father of radar’, is commemorated with a blue plaque at 287 Sheen Lane.
- Princess Maud, Countess of Southesk (1893–1945), granddaughter of King Edward VII, was born at East Sheen Lodge.
- Esmond Knight (1906–1987), actor, was born in East Sheen.
- Desmond Hawkins (1908–1999), author, editor and radio personality, was born in East Sheen.
- Frank Broadbent (1909–1983), architect, who designed churches and schools for the Roman Catholic Church, lived at 71 Christchurch Road, East Sheen.
- Richard Dimbleby (1913–1965), radio broadcaster, was born in the borough and lived in a flat at Cedar Court, East Sheen. This has been commemorated by an English Heritage blue plaque.
- Patricia Hornsby-Smith, Baroness Hornsby-Smith (1914–1985), Conservative Party politician, was born in East Sheen.
- John Chadwick (1920–1998), linguist and classical scholar, was born in East Sheen.
- Peter Graham Scott (1923–2007), film producer, director, editor and screenwriter, was born in East Sheen.
- Don Lawrence (1928–2003), comic book artist and author, was born in East Sheen.
- Marc Bolan (1947–1977), musician, lived on Upper Richmond Road West, East Sheen.

== Education ==
Schools in the area include: Richmond Park Academy; Tower House Boys' Preparatory School, a small independent prep-school for boys aged 4–13; East Sheen Primary School, a state school on Upper Richmond Road West; Sheen Mount School, a state primary school on West Temple; and Thomson House School, located on Vernon Road.

== Transport ==
Mortlake railway station is 300m north of The Triangle and can be accessed from Sheen Lane. Transport for London bus routes 33, 337 and 493 serve Upper Richmond Road West.

== Demography and housing ==
2011 Census homes
Ward	Detached	Semi-detached	Terraced	Flats and apartments	Caravans/temporary/mobile homes/houseboats	Shared between households
(ward)	471	1,129	1,310	1,192	0	49

2011 Census households
Ward	Population	Households	% Owned outright	% Owned with a loan	Hectares
(ward)	10,348	4,252	35	35	584

== East Sheen in art ==
The Triangle in East Sheen is the subject of a painting, The Triangle, Sheen Lane, East Sheen, Surrey by James Isaiah Lewis (1861–1934), which is in the Richmond upon Thames Borough Art Collection and is held at Orleans House Gallery in Twickenham.

== See also ==
- Barnes, London
- Mortlake
