= East Sheen Baptist Church =

Church in London, England

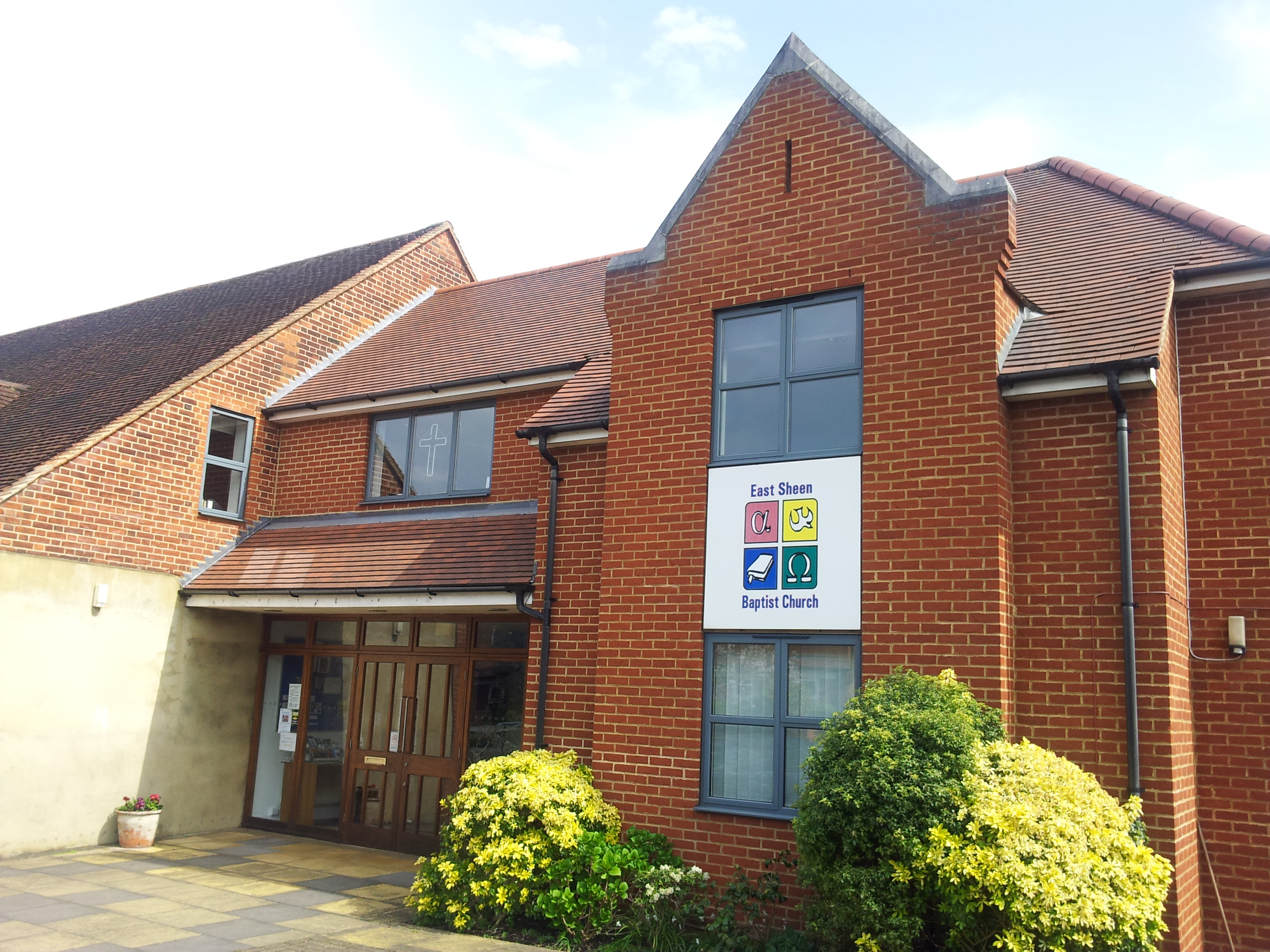
- Entrance to East Sheen Baptist Church
- East Sheen Baptist Church
- 51°27′49.3″N 0°16′18.1″W
- Location: Temple Sheen Road, East Sheen, London SW14 7PY
- Country: England
- Denomination: Baptist
- Website: eastsheenbaptist.co.uk

Clergy
- Pastor: Rev Dr Louise Hearn

East Sheen Baptist Church is an evangelical church in East Sheen in the London Borough of Richmond upon Thames. It is affiliated to the London Baptist Association. The pastor is Rev Dr Louise Hearn.

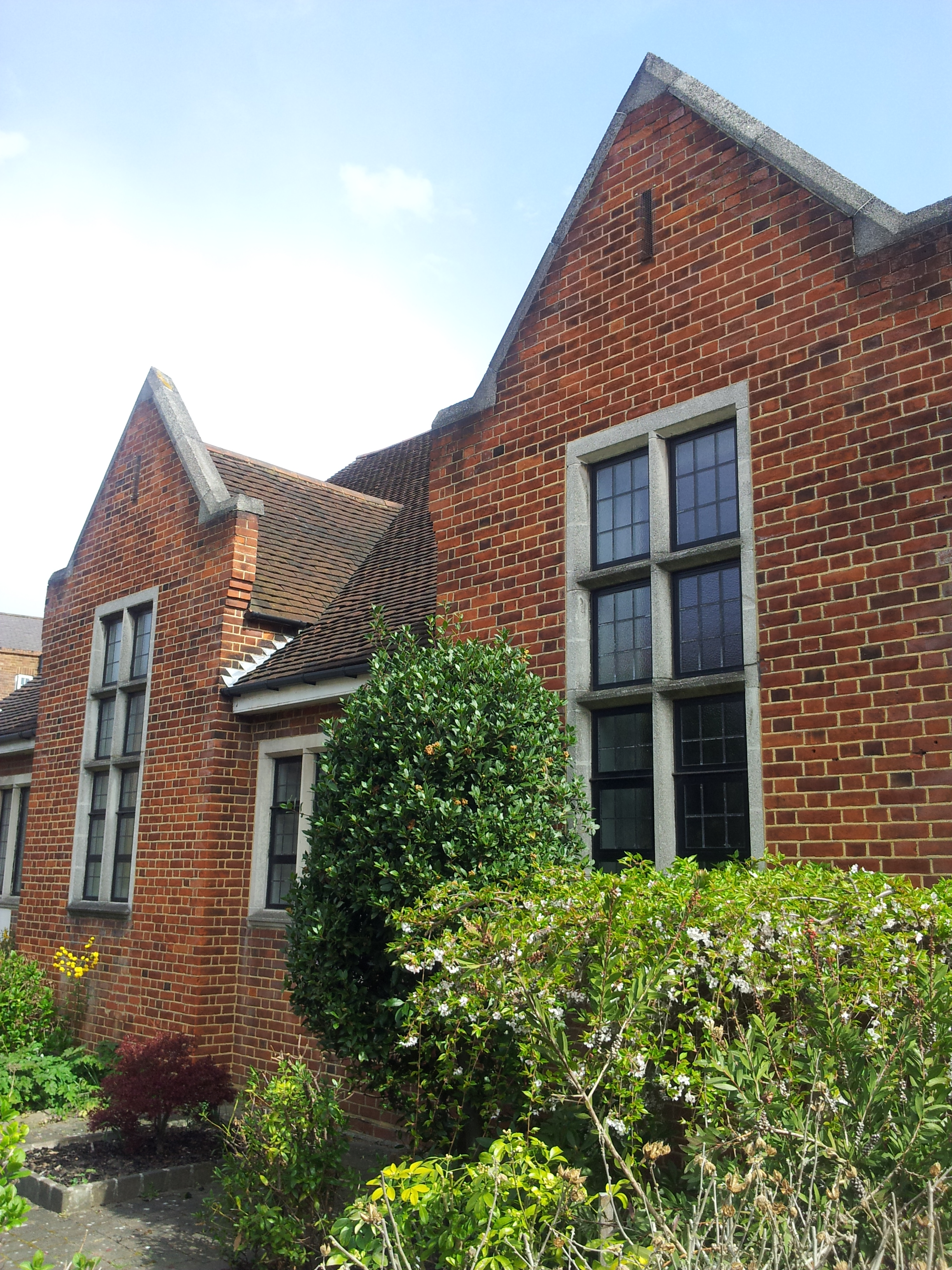
East Sheen Baptist Church

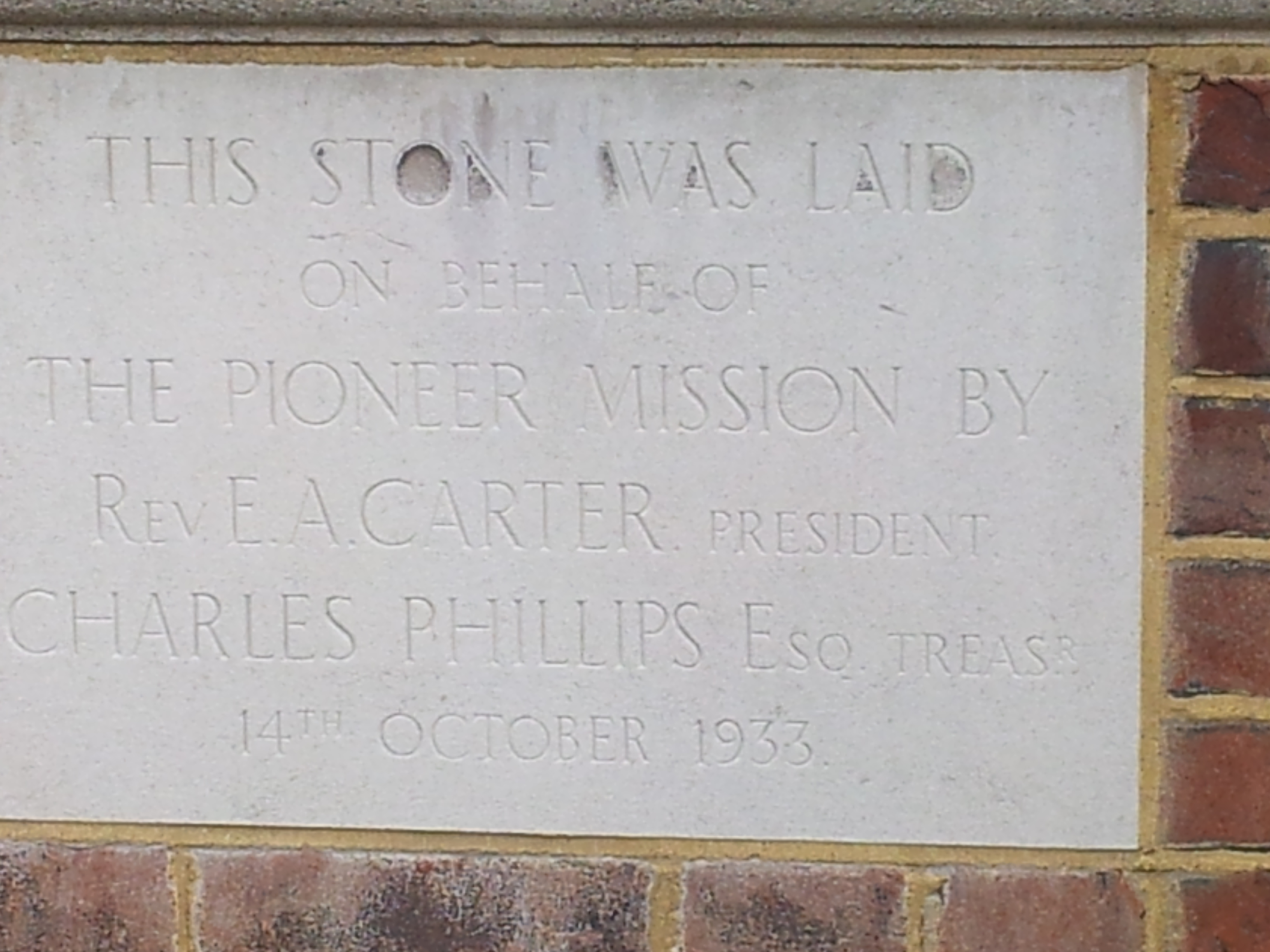
Foundation stone at East Sheen Baptist Church

The church holds services on Sunday mornings, which are also live-streamed.
