= Habitats & Heritage =

English charity

- Founded: 2020
- Legal status: Registered charity
- Location: ETNA Community Centre,13 Rosslyn Road, East Twickenham, TW1 2AR (London Borough of Richmond upon Thames), England, UK
- Region served: South and West London
- Key people: Paul Jennings (Chief Executive); Ann Hagell (Chair of Trustees)
- Website: habitatsandheritage.org.uk

Habitats & Heritage is a registered charity based at East Twickenham in the London Borough of Richmond upon Thames. It works in the London Boroughs of Richmond; Hounslow; Kingston; Wandsworth; Ealing; and Merton. It aims to understand the deep connection between urban nature and history by taking care of the local landscape; its wildlife, ecosystems and heritage.

The organisation was formed when the Environmental Trust for Richmond upon Thames merged with the South West London Environmental Network (SWLEN) in autumn 2020. It adopted its present name in November 2020.

Its chief executive is Paul Jennings.

Habitats & Heritage are guardians of several local buildings, including:

- Grove Gardens Chapel, Richmond Old Cemetery
- St Leonard's Court Air Raid Shelter, East Sheen
- Thames Eyot Boathouse, Twickenham
- The Burton Mausoleum, St Mary Magdalen's Church, Mortlake
- The Kilmorey Mausoleum, St Margarets
- The Bazalgette Mausoleum, St Mary's Church, Wimbledon
