= Christ Church, East Sheen =

- Christ Church, East Sheen
- 51°27′37.0″N 0°16′30.4″W
- Country: England
- Denomination: Church of England
- Website: www.christchurcheastsheen.org.uk

History
- Consecrated: 13 January 1864

Architecture
- Years built: 1862–64

Specifications
- Materials: stone

Administration
- Diocese: Southwark
- Archdeaconry: Wandsworth
- Deanery: Richmond & Barnes
- Parish: Mortlake with East Sheen

Clergy
- Bishop: Christopher Chessun
- Vicar: Rev Jonathan Haynes (Team Rector)
- Pastor: William Arnold

Listed Building – Grade II
- Designated: 25 June 1983
- Reference no.: 1080841

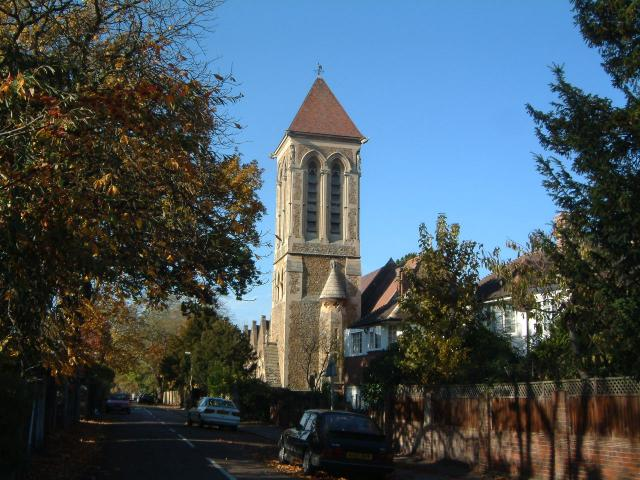
Christ Church East Sheen

Christ Church, East Sheen, is a Church of England church in East Sheen in the London Borough of Richmond upon Thames. The church has a weekly Eucharist at 10 am; weekly Messy Church from 3:30 pm on a Monday (term time), monthly Choral Evensong 5 pm on the 3rd Sunday and weekly Holy Communion (Communion, Coffee and Cake) according to the Book of Common Prayer 10:30 am Wednesdays and monthly on the 1st Sunday 8 am.

There is a full musical life at Christ Church, with regular adult choir, choristers and choral scholars, as well as a Spring/Summer recital series in June and July. The church welcomes numerous external groups and artists who rehearse and perform.

The adjacent Community Hall was built in 2016 and is used for parties, clubs and groups.

There is a defibrillator next to the south door.

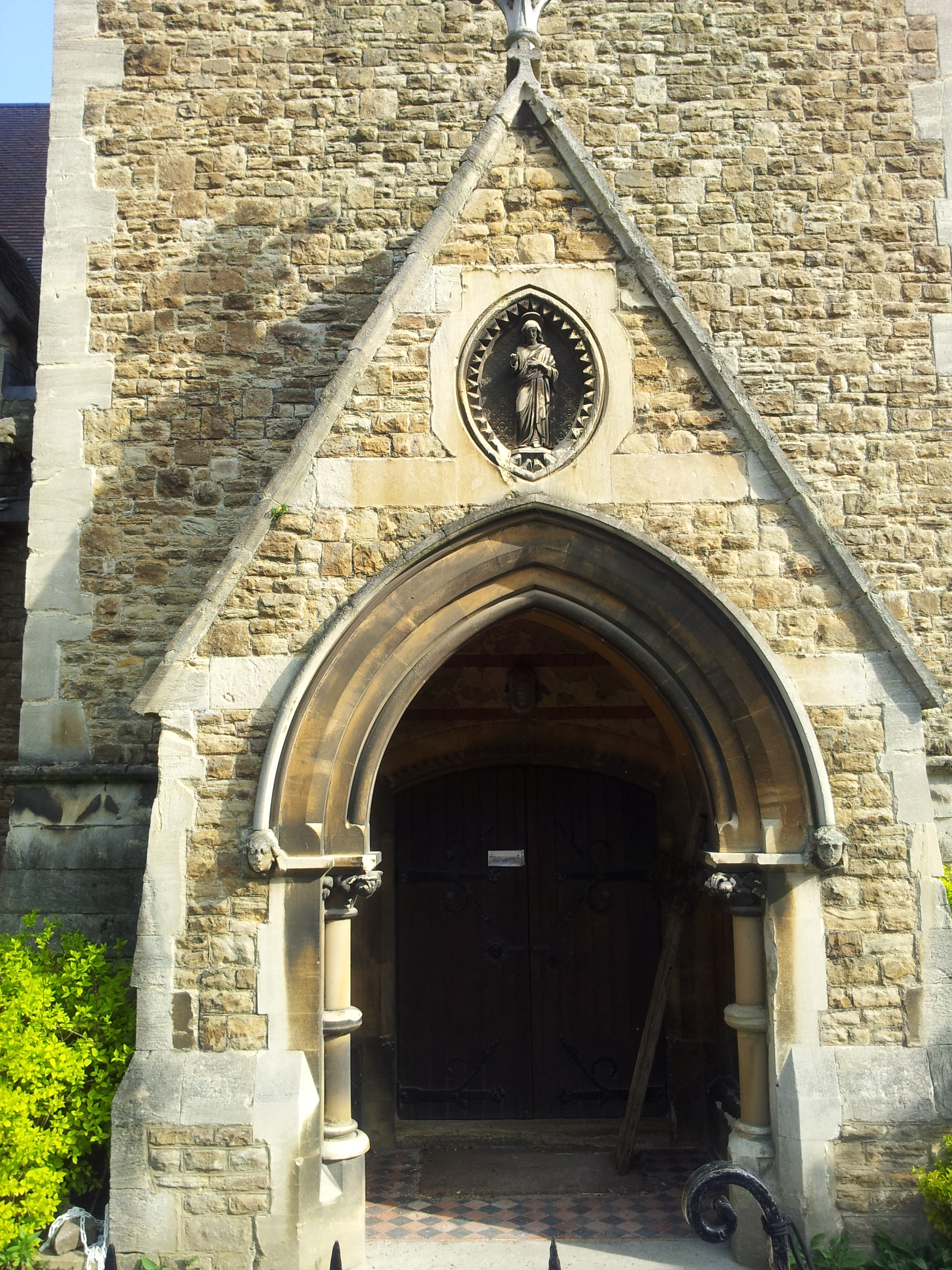
Church entrance

An early work of the architect Arthur Blomfield, who was assisted by the architect and author Thomas Hardy the church building, which is in stone, was erected between 1862 and 1864 and extended in 1887. It was built on farmland at the entrance of East Sheen Common. It was originally planned to be opened in April 1863; however, the tower collapsed shortly before completion and had to be rebuilt. The church was finally completed and consecrated nine months later, on 13 January 1864. The building is Grade II listed, as are the wrought iron railings around the building to the south and west. In 2024 the lighting system in the church was replaced thanks to a legacy from the late Edward Steers, former Reader of the parish.

Christ Church is part of the Mortlake with East Sheen Team Ministry which includes St Mary the Virgin, Mortlake and All Saints Church, East Sheen.

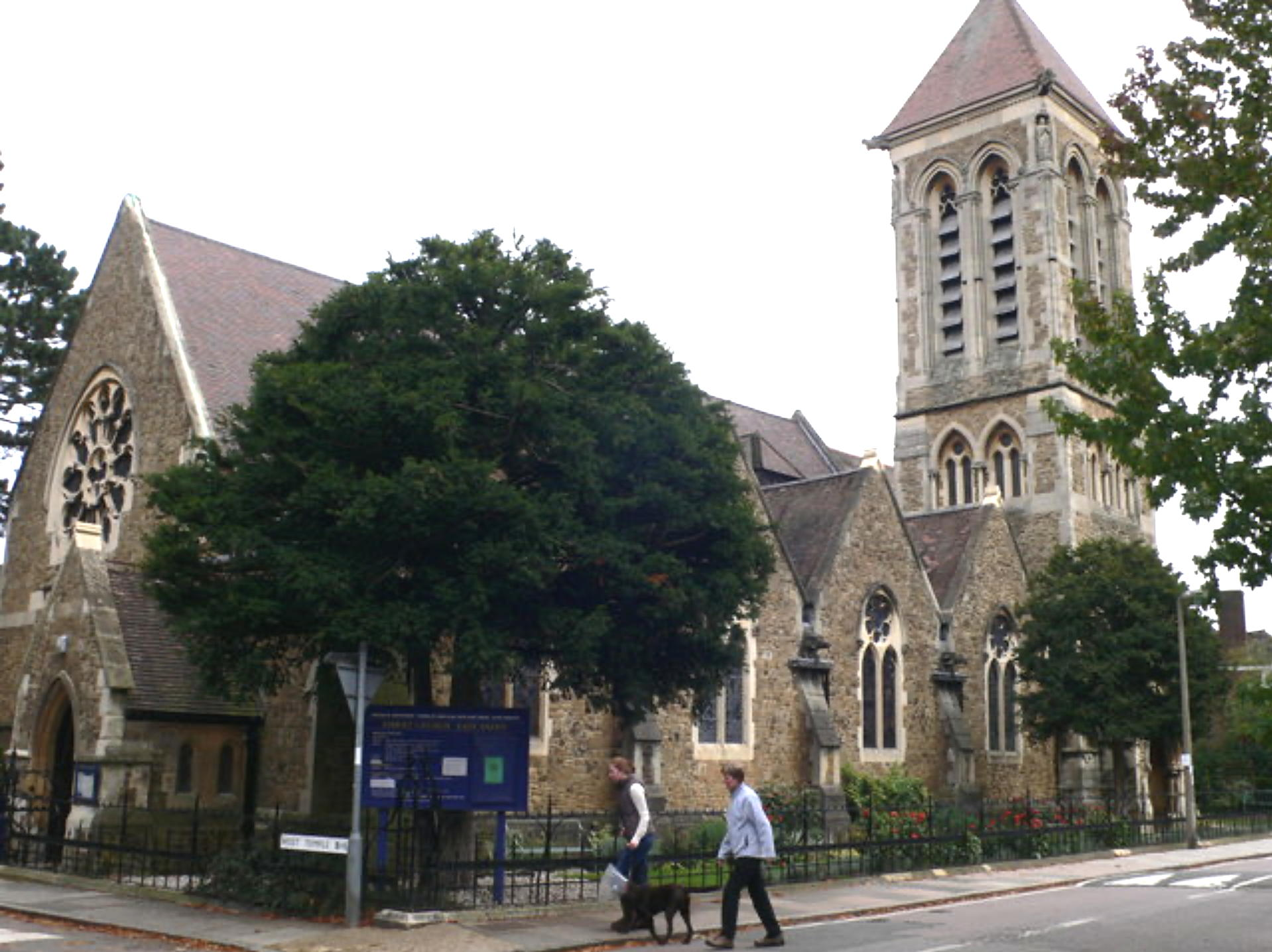
Christ Church

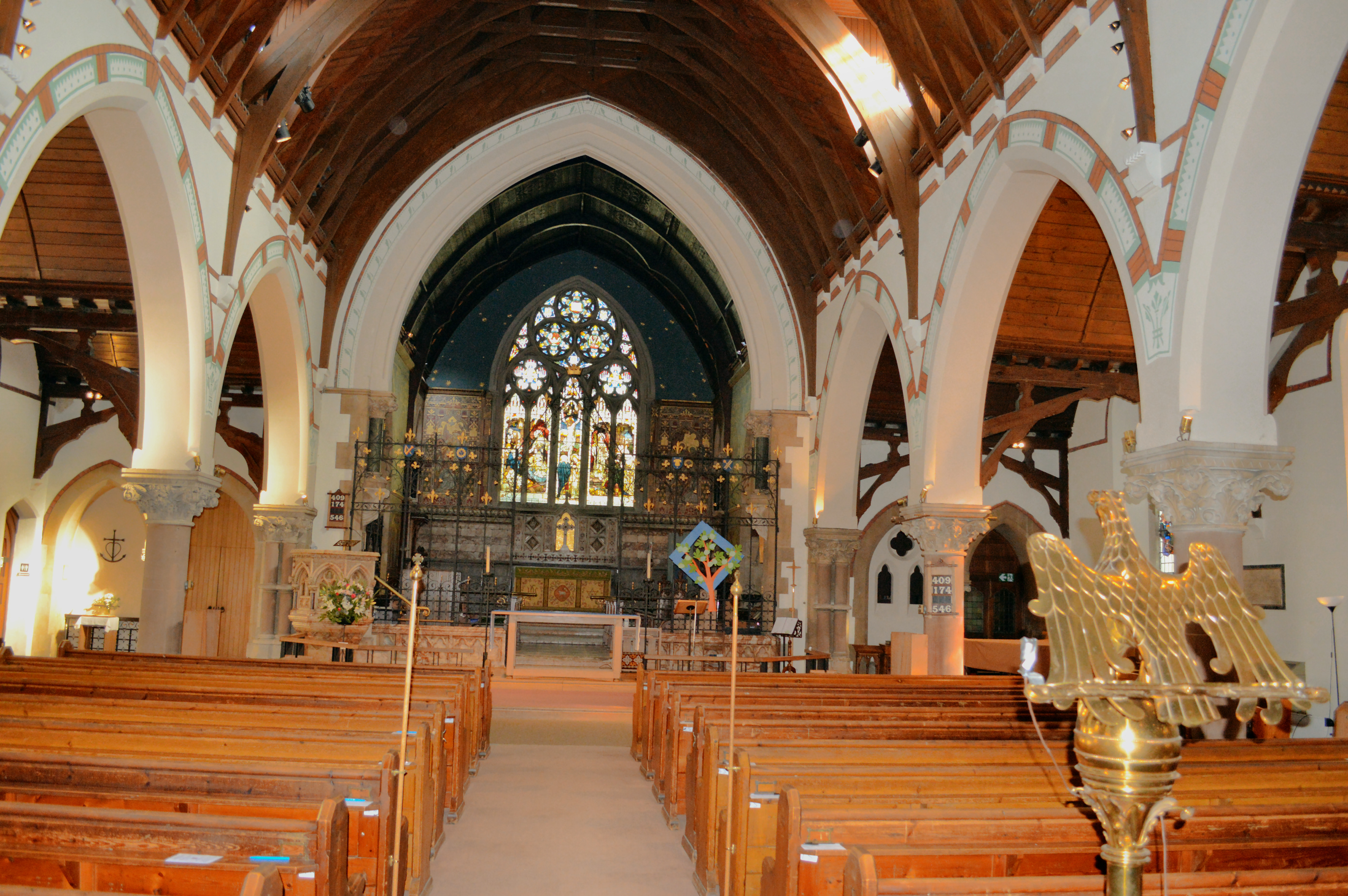
Interior

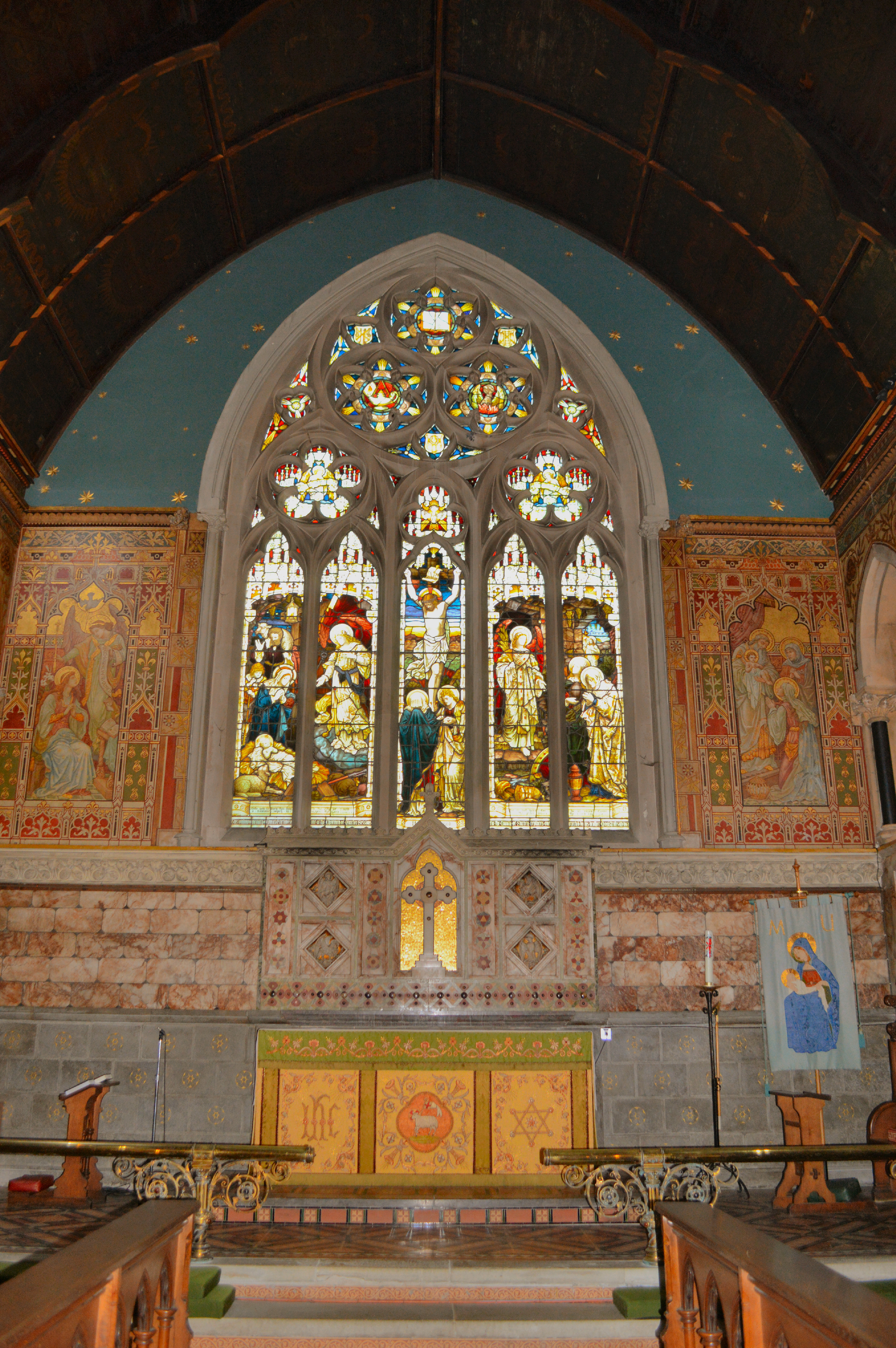
Frescos

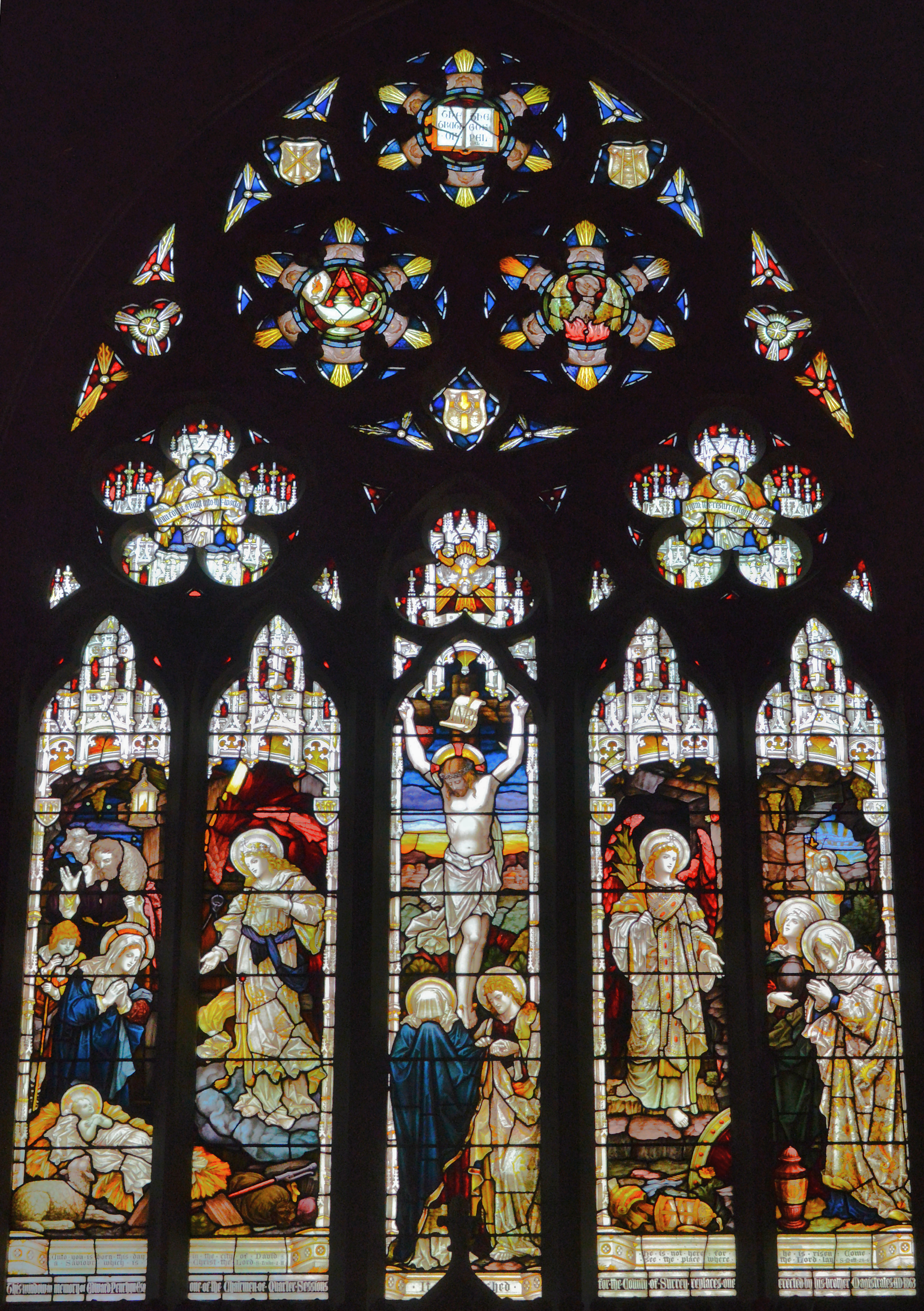
East window

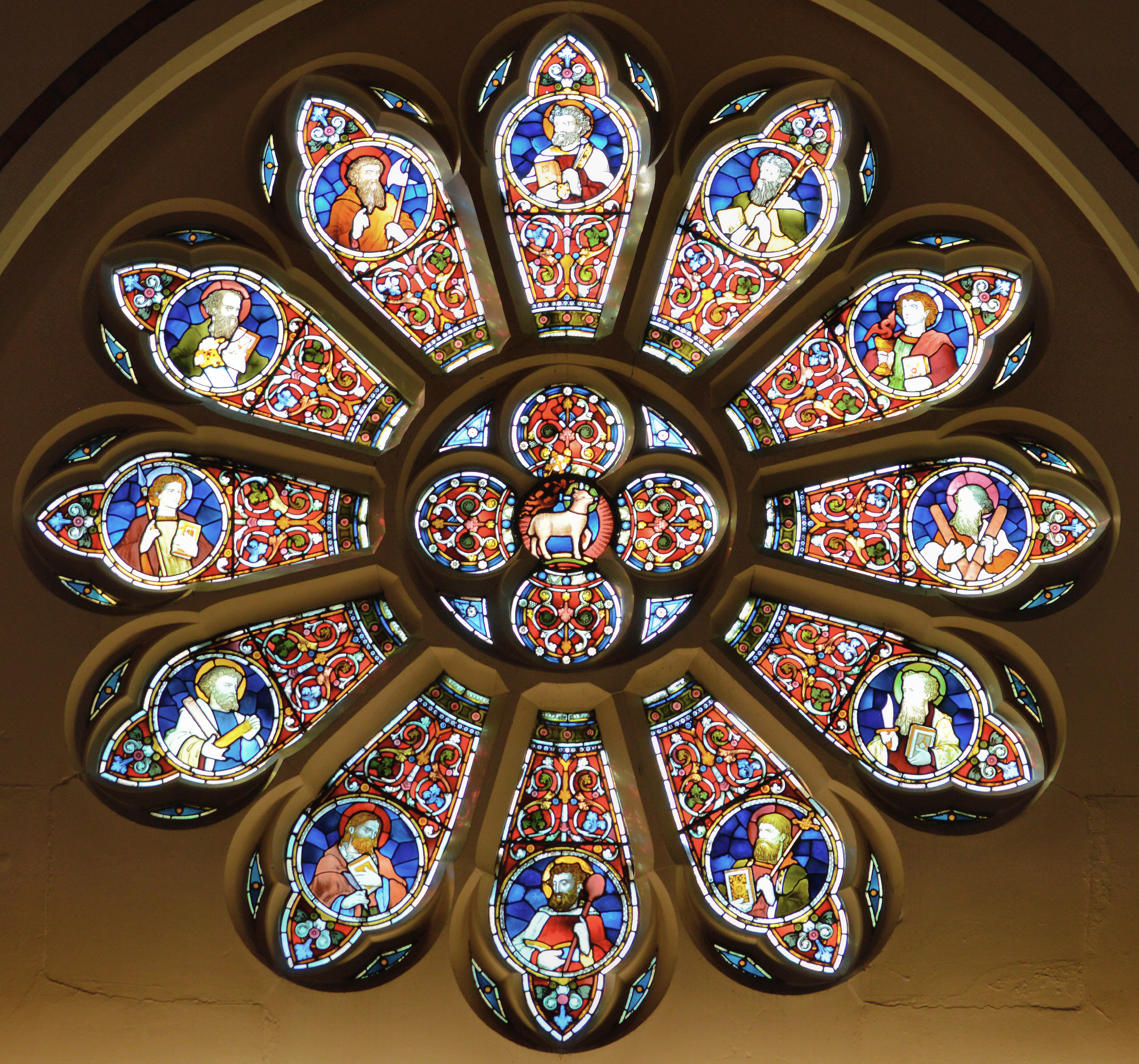
West window

Mortlake Quiet Gardens are based around the landscaped churchyard and are affiliated to The Quiet Garden Trust.
