= First Church of Christ, Scientist, Richmond =

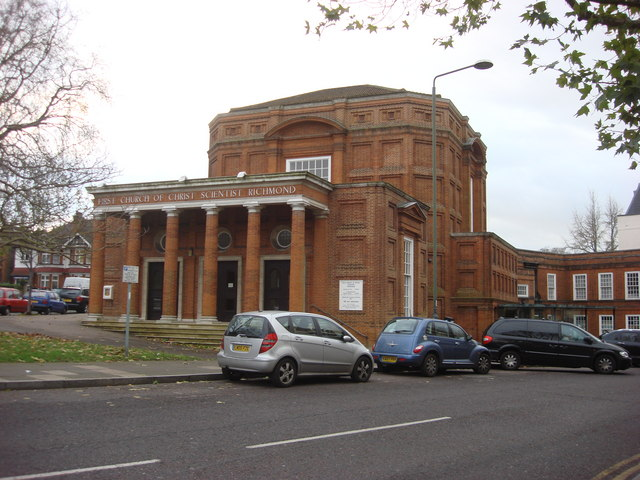
- The church from the northwest
- First Church of Christ, Scientist, Richmond
- 51.4609°N 0.3003°W
- OS grid reference: TQ 18176 74916
- Location: 35 Sheen Road, Richmond, London TW9 1AD
- Country: England
- Denomination: Christian Science
- Website: www.fccsrichmond.org.uk

Architecture
- Functional status: active
- Architect(s): W Braxton Sinclair and Barton
- Groundbreaking: 1939
- Completed: 1953

First Church of Christ, Scientist, Richmond, is a church on Sheen Road, Richmond, London. It is a branch of The First Church of Christ, Scientist in Boston, Massachusetts, founded in 1879.

== Architecture ==
It was built between 1939 and 1953; the architects were W. Braxton Sinclair (who also designed the Grade II listed First Church of Christ Scientist in Bromley) and Barton. Bridget Cherry and Nikolaus Pevsner describe it as having "heavily modelled red brickwork, with some free Baroque details".

== Services and activities ==
On Sunday mornings there is a church service and also a Sunday school for people under 20. A weekly testimony meeting is held on Wednesdays evenings.

The building includes a reading room.

The church is registered (number 81398) as a place of worship in accordance with the Places of Worship Registration Act 1855.

== See also ==
- Cadogan Hall, the former First Church of Christ, Scientist, London
- First Church of Christ, Scientist (Brighton)
- former First Church of Christ, Scientist, Fallowfield, Manchester
