= Elizabeth Hardin =

English composer and organist

Elizabeth Hardin (1750–1780) was an English composer and organist. As a teenager (c.1764) she was appointed as the organist of St Peter le Poer church on Broad Street, London; she likely worked there until her death in 1780 when she was aged 29. In 1770 she published "Six Lessons for the Harpsichord", a series of pieces primarily in binary form written in the classical style, which feature hand crossovers in the style of Scarlatti. Hardin's music has been recorded by composer and performer Barbara Harbach and was released on the CD Sonatas By Elizabeth alongside music by Elisabetta de Gambarini.
