= North Sheen railway station =

National Rail station in London, England

North Sheen
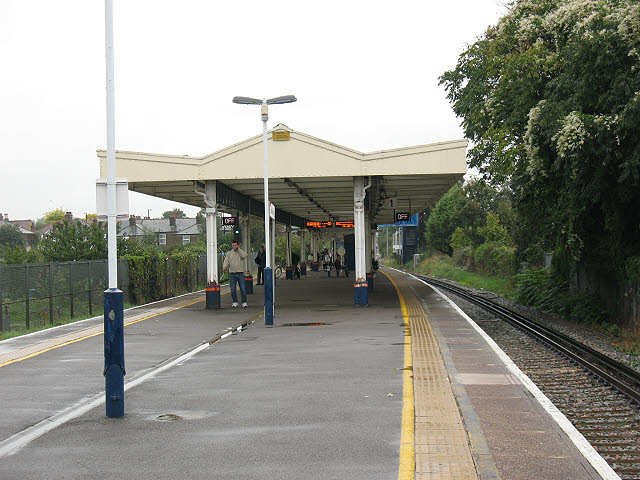
- Interactive map of North Sheen

General information
- Location: Richmond
- Local authority: Richmond upon Thames
- Managed by: South Western Railway
- Station code: NSH
- DfT category: E
- Number of platforms: 2
- Fare zone: 3

National Rail annual entry and exit
- 2020–21: ▼0.116 million
- 2021–22: ▲0.235 million
- 2022–23: ▲0.270 million
- 2023–24: ▲0.319 million
- 2024–25: ▲0.342 million

Key dates
- 6 July 1930: Opened

Other information
- External links: Departures; Facilities
- Coordinates: 51.4656°N 0.2865°W

North Sheen railway station is in the London Borough of Richmond upon Thames, in south-west London, and is in London fare zone 3. The station, on the eastern edge of Richmond, is named after the North Sheen area which, in 1965, was absorbed by Kew. It is 9 miles 3 chains (14.5 km) down the line from London Waterloo.

It was opened by the Southern Railway on 6 July 1930. The station and all trains serving it are now operated by South Western Railway.

North Sheen station serves the area between Mortlake and Richmond stations on the South Western Railway main line rail service.

== Footbridge ==
North Sheen station is just off Manor Road, where there is a level crossing. Originally, the railway was planned to run through a narrow cutting, allowing Green Lane (as Manor Road was then called) to be carried over the railway by a road bridge.

The station had a footbridge allowing access to the island platforms from both sides of the level crossing, but now only the northern half of that bridge remains. A new bridge, on the opposite side of the level crossing to the station, was opened in October 2013 after members of the public had been invited to submit designs. When the level crossing is closed, passengers wishing to gain access to the platforms from the south side of Manor Road have to use both bridges.

== Access ==
The station is not wheelchair-accessible, nor is the footbridge.

== Services ==
All services at North Sheen are operated by South Western Railway.

The typical off-peak service in trains per hour is:

- 2 tph to London Waterloo via Barnes
- 2 tph to Teddington, returning to London Waterloo via Kingston and Wimbledon

Additional services, including trains to and from London Waterloo via Hounslow call at the station during the peak hours.

Preceding station	National Rail	Following station
Mortlake	South Western Railway Kingston Loop Line	Richmond
