= All Saints Church, East Sheen =

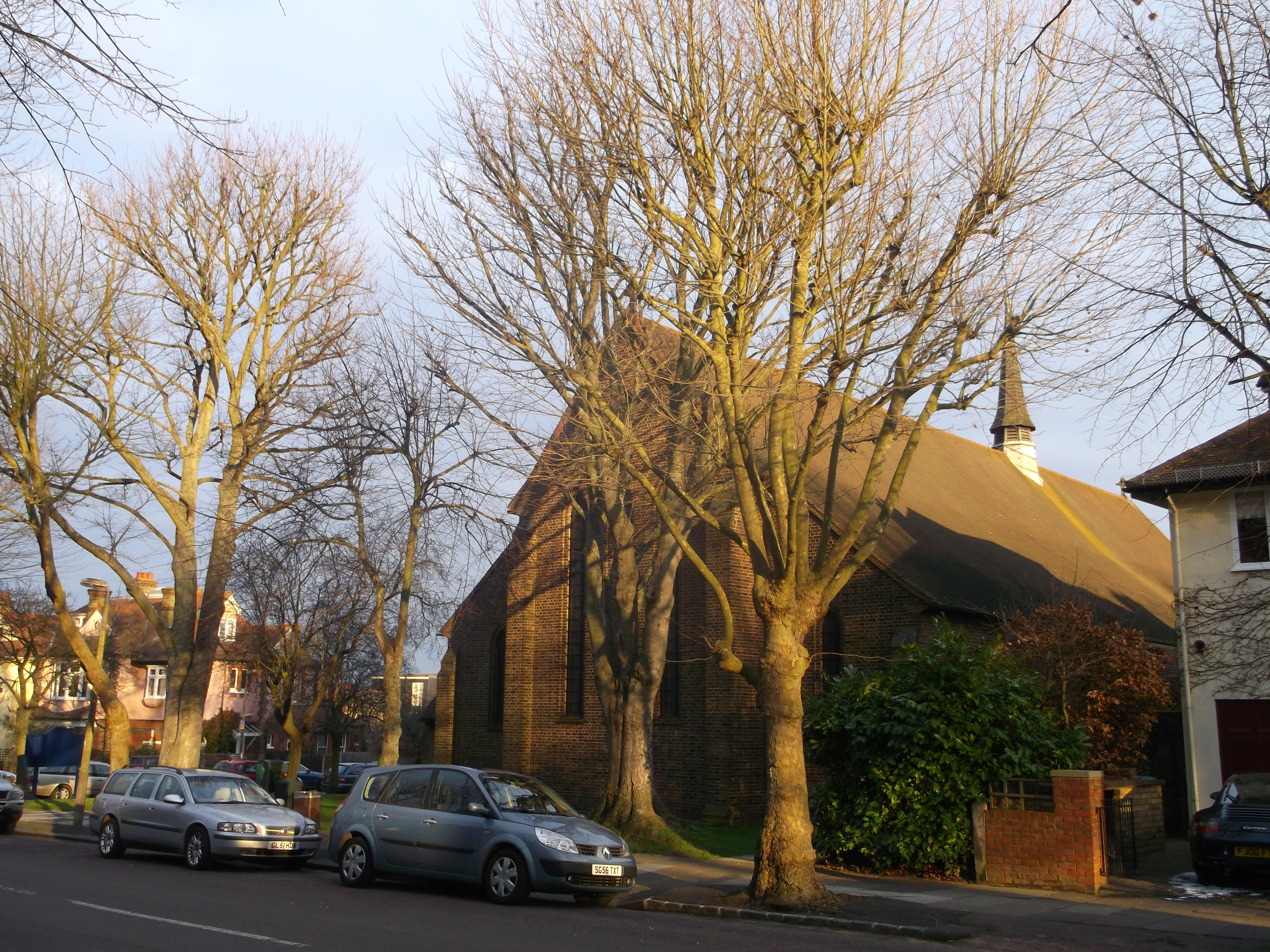
- All Saints Church, East Sheen
- All Saints Church, East Sheen
- 51°27′44.8″N 0°15′42.6″W
- Location: East Sheen Avenue, East Sheen, London SW14
- Country: England
- Denomination: Church of England
- Website: www.allsaintschurch.org.uk

History
- Founded: 1928
- Consecrated: All Saints' Day 1929

Architecture
- Architect(s): J E Newberry & C W Fowler
- Years built: 1929
- Groundbreaking: Foundation stone laid on 28 October 1928

Specifications
- Materials: red brick

Administration
- Diocese: SOUTHWARK
- Archdeaconry: Wandsworth
- Deanery: Richmond & Barnes
- Parish: Mortlake with East Sheen

Clergy
- Bishop: Christopher Chessun
- Vicar: Rev Alex Barrow

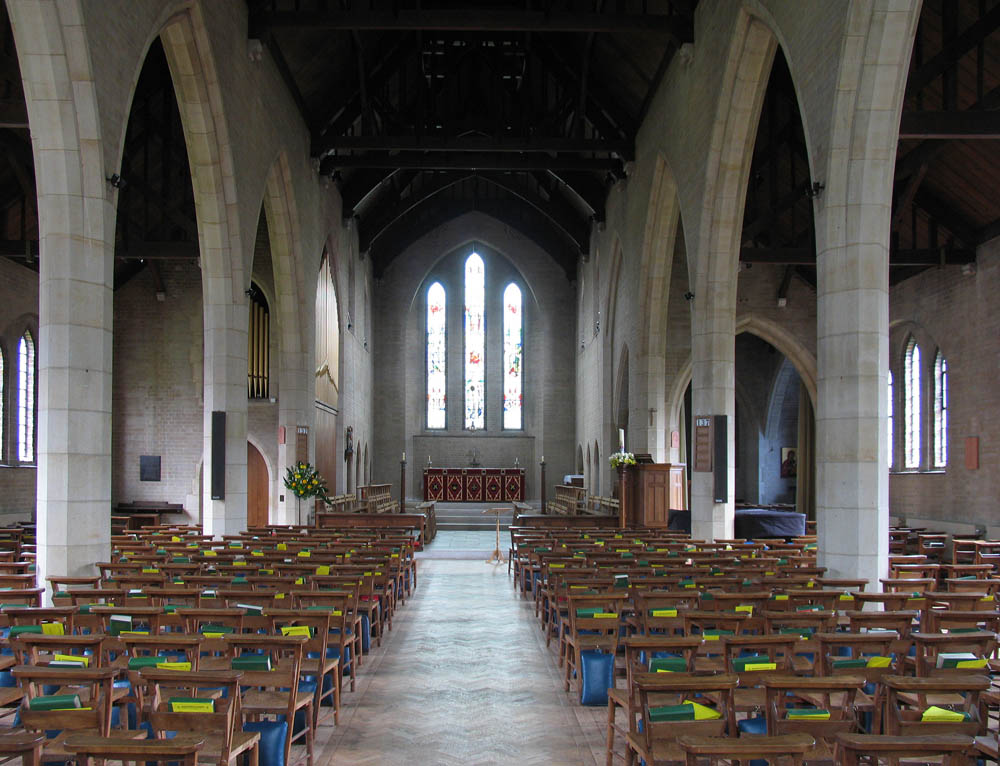
Interior of All Saints, East Sheen

All Saints Church, East Sheen, is a church in the London Borough of Richmond upon Thames, located at the junction of East Sheen Avenue and Park Avenue in East Sheen. All Saints Church is a member of the Anglican Communion and the Church of England and the style of worship is Modern Catholic. There are three regular Sunday services at 8:00am, 10:00am and at midday.

Together with St Mary the Virgin, Mortlake and Christ Church, East Sheen All Saints is part of the Mortlake with East Sheen Team Ministry.

== The building ==
Built to serve the growing suburb of East Sheen, the building's foundation stone was laid on 28 October 1928 by Elizabeth Bowes-Lyon (who was then the Duchess of York and later became Queen Elizabeth The Queen Mother).

The church was built on land bequeathed under the will of Major Shepherd-Cross, MP for Bolton, who lived at nearby Palewell Lodge from 1896 until his death in 1913. It was consecrated on All Saints' Day 1929.

The architects were J E Newberry & C W Fowler.

Fire destroyed much of the nave in 1963, and the roof was later rebuilt.

The building includes a stained glass window commemorating Suzy Lamplugh, the estate agent who went missing in 1986, and who was, with her family, a member of All Saints congregation. The window was installed in her memory in 1996.

The terracotta Stations of the Cross were sculpted by Nathan David.

The church has a lady chapel which is used for the early morning service on Sundays and for other services during the week. There is also a church hall.
