= St Peter le Poer =

Former church-site in London

Coordinates: 51.5151°N 0.0850°W

St Peter Le Poer
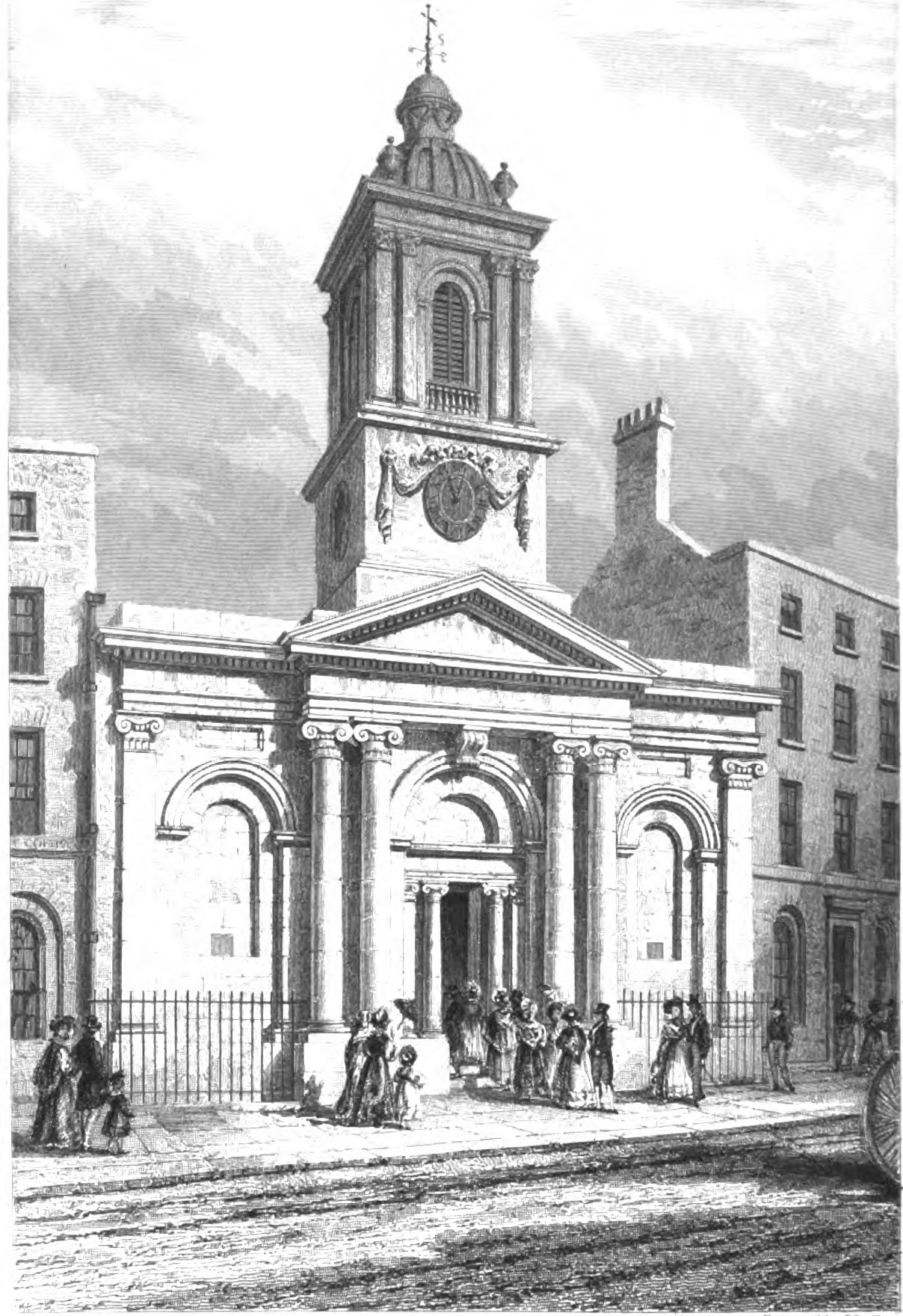
- St Peter le Poer in 1839
- St Peter Le Poer
- Location: City of London
- Country: England
- Denomination: Church of England

Architecture
- Architect: Jesse Gibson
- Style: Baroque
- Demolished: 1907

St Peter le Poer was a parish church on the west side of Broad Street in the City of London. Established before the end of the 12th Century, it was rebuilt in 1540, and again in 1792 to a design by Jesse Gibson with a circular nave. It was demolished in 1907.

== Early history ==
The church, often spelt "St Peter le Poor", was in existence by the end of the 12th century. The name was traditionally explained as a reference to the poverty of the area – although by the beginning of the 19th century it was one of the richest in the City – or to its proximity to the monastery of St Augustine, whose monks professed indigence. The patronage of the church belonged to the dean and chapter of St Paul's Cathedral.

St Peter's was rebuilt in 1540, and enlarged on the north side in 1615. In 1630 the steeple was rebuilt, and a west gallery added. The church survived the Great Fire of London in 1666. As it stood in the later 18th century, the building was 54 feet long and 51 feet wide, with a small tower in the north-west corner. A clock hung from the middle of a beam extending across the road from the church. By this time the ground level around the church had risen so much by this time that it was felt necessary to draw curtains across the lower parts of the windows during services, to stop passers-by looking in. Also during this time, the church employed the composer Elizabeth Hardin as church organist.

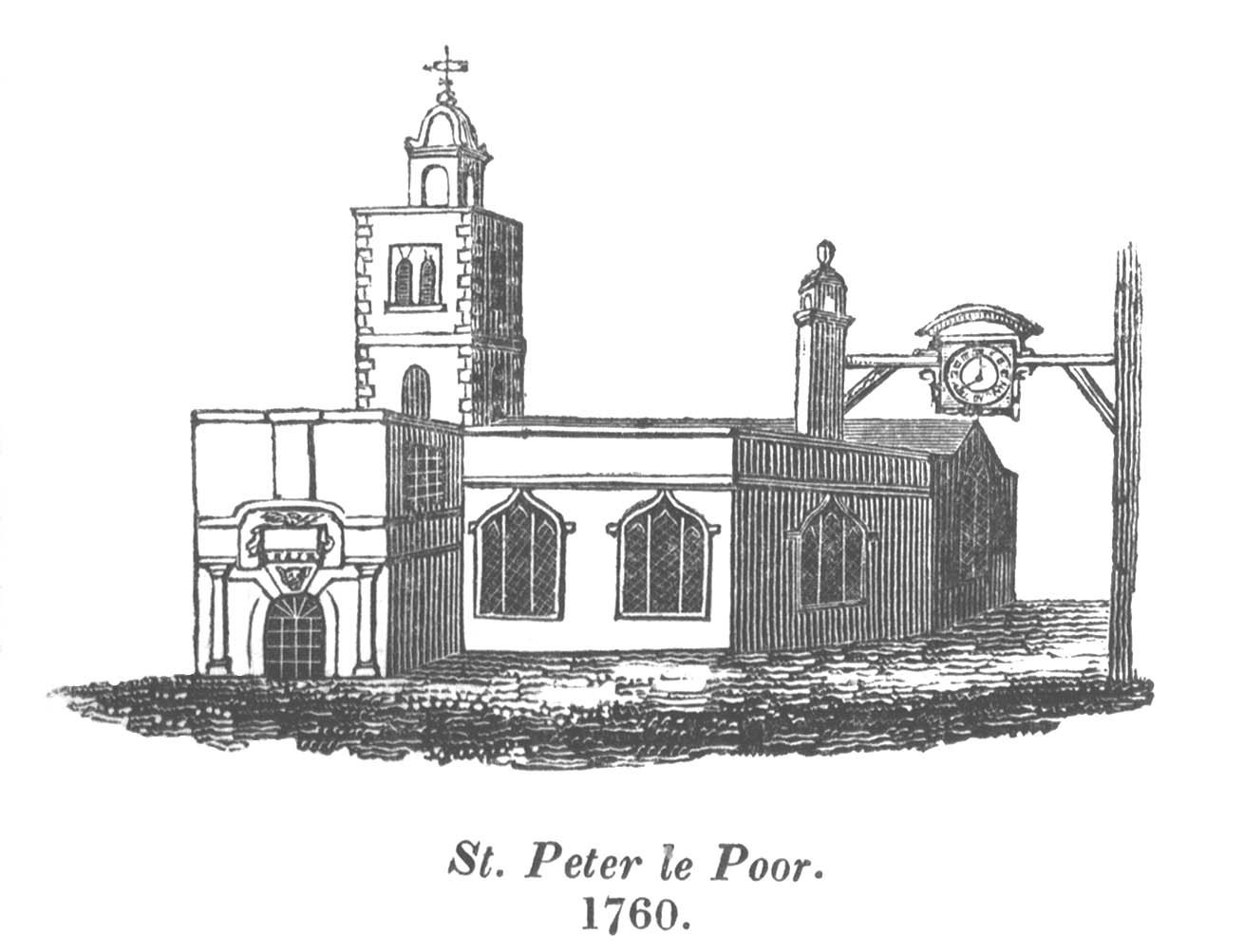
The church as it appeared in 1760.

== Rebuilding ==
The church had fallen into such a poor condition by 1788, that the parishioners obtained an act of parliament to demolish and rebuild it. The new building, to the designs of Jesse Gibson, was consecrated on 19 November 1792. It cost more than £4,000, £400 of which was provided by the City. The old church had projected into Broad Street, but the new one was placed further back over the old churchyard, the site of the medieval chancel becoming part of the roadway. Some of the monuments in the old church were broken up and their brass plates sold to a plumber in the Minories.

The layout of the new church ignored conventional orientation, having the altar on the north-west side directly opposite the entrance. The nave was circular in plan, about 54 feet across, with a circular niche for the altar and a porch and vestry on the opposite side. A wooden gallery, supported by brackets concealed in the flooring, ran around almost the entire circumference of the interior, except for a section above the altar. The coved ceiling was ornamented with panels, each decorated with a flower. The centre of the ceiling rose into a large lantern with glass sides. There were no side windows. The interior was described in John Britton's Illustrations of the Public Buildings of London as having "more the air of a lecture room than a church".

The east front in Broad Street had an entrance facade with four attached columns supporting an entablature and pediment, behind which rose a low square tower, ornamented with pilasters and urns. The church was surrounded by houses on the remaining sides. The circular form of the interior was not evident from the street.

== Demolition ==
As late as 1884, the St Peter's received a new Henry Willis organ but, as the City's resident population declined, it was deemed surplus to requirements and demolished in 1907, under the Union of Benefices Act 1860. The parish was united with that of St Michael, Cornhill. The interior was photographed by the architectural photographer Bedford Lemere shortly before demolition.

Proceeds from the sale of the site were used to build St Peter Le Poer in Friern Barnet, which also received the City church's font, pulpit and panelling. The new St Peter Le Poer in Barnet was built in 1909–1910 by W. D. Caröe. The foundation stone was laid on 2 November 1909 and the church was consecrated 28 June 1910 by the Bishop of London, the Rt Rev Arthur Foley Winnington-Ingram. It is a Grade II listed building.
