= Mortlake railway station =

National Rail station in London, England

Mortlake
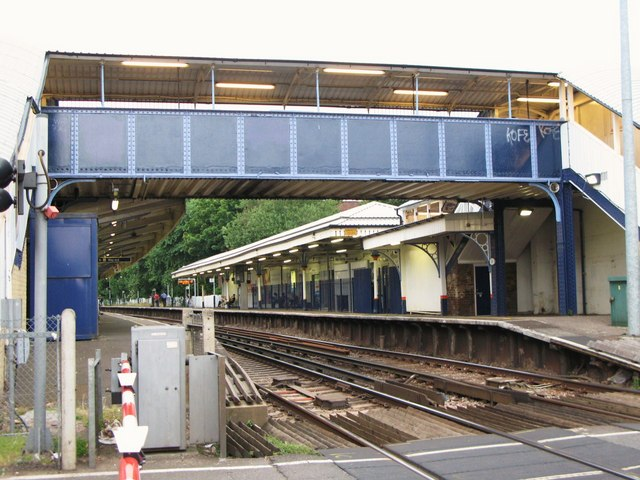
- Interactive map of Mortlake

General information
- Location: Mortlake
- Local authority: Richmond upon Thames
- Managed by: South Western Railway
- Station code: MTL
- DfT category: C2
- Number of platforms: 2
- Accessible: Yes
- Fare zone: 3

National Rail annual entry and exit
- 2020–21: ▼0.439 million
- 2021–22: ▲1.021 million
- 2022–23: ▲1.253 million
- 2023–24: ▲1.470 million
- 2024–25: ▲1.547 million

Railway companies
- Original company: Richmond and West End Railway
- Pre-grouping: London and South Western Railway
- Post-grouping: Southern Railway

Key dates
- 27 July 1846: Opened as Mortlake
- 1 April 1886: Renamed Mortlake & East Sheen
- 30 January 1916: Renamed Mortlake

Other information
- External links: Departures; Facilities
- Coordinates: 51.4682°N 0.2672°W

Mortlake railway station is in the London Borough of Richmond upon Thames, in south London, and is in London fare zone 3. It is 8 miles 21 chains (13.3 km) down the line from London Waterloo.

The station and all trains serving it are operated by South Western Railway. Postal district and boundary changes over many years mean that Mortlake now serves the area known as East Sheen as well as the area of Mortlake, both of which share the SW14 postcode. Mortlake is the closest station to the finish of the Oxford-Cambridge University Boat Race.

== History ==
The station was opened on 27 July 1846, when the London and South Western Railway officially opened the line to Richmond for public service. Along with Richmond, it was not finished in time for a directors' special on 22 July 1846 and was still incomplete when the line opened due to delays in obtaining land.

The original station was said to be similar to neighbouring Barnes Station in its Tudor Gothic-style, but much smaller. The office at Mortlake was described as being very small, with a very small entrance room and a small inner room for the ladies' waiting-room. None of the original station survives.

It was renamed Mortlake & East Sheen in 1886, before it was renamed back to Mortlake in 1916.

Queen Victoria's Waiting Room The building next to Mortlake railway station – now occupied by a classic car showroom – houses Queen Victoria's old waiting room, built for her and Prince Albert as they frequented White Lodge in Richmond Park, where their family and later their son, the Prince of Wales (later Edward VII), lived.

== Platforms and infrastructure ==
The station has two platforms:

- Platform 1 is an eastbound platform for services to London Waterloo via Clapham Junction.
- Platform 2 is a westbound platform for services to London Waterloo via Richmond.

There is a ticket office on Platform 2 and a footbridge between the two platforms.

There is a level crossing across Sheen Lane just beyond the east end of the station. More than 3800 vehicles and nearly 2400 pedestrians use the crossing daily and 349 trains pass over the crossing each weekday. It is considered to be the fourth most risky CCTV-crossing on Network Rail's Wessex Route.

== Services ==
All services at Mortlake are operated by South Western Railway.

The typical off-peak service in trains per hour is:

- 2 tph to London Waterloo via Barnes
- 2 tph to Teddington, returning to London Waterloo via Kingston and Wimbledon

Additional services, including trains to and from London Waterloo via Hounslow call at the station during the peak hours.

Preceding station	National Rail	Following station
Barnes	South Western Railway Kingston Loop Line	North Sheen

== Connections ==
London Buses routes 419 and 533, mobility route 969, and night route N22 serve the station.
