= W. Braxton Sinclair =

British architect

Captain William Charles Braxton Sinclair FRIBA (1883 – 29 November 1962) was a British architect who worked in the United Kingdom and in Burma, where he was a captain in the Royal Engineers. He was also a local historian.

== Army service ==
Sinclair was born in Highbury, Middlesex, England, to Charles John Sinclair, an accountant. He joined The Essex Regiment and was promoted to second lieutenant in 1907 in the 3rd Battalion and lieutenant in the 6th Battalion in 1910. As lieutenant, he served with the regiment in the First World War. In the Second World War he served with the Royal Engineers, initially as a lieutenant and later as a captain. Three photographs associated with his war service are held at the National Army Museum.

== Works ==
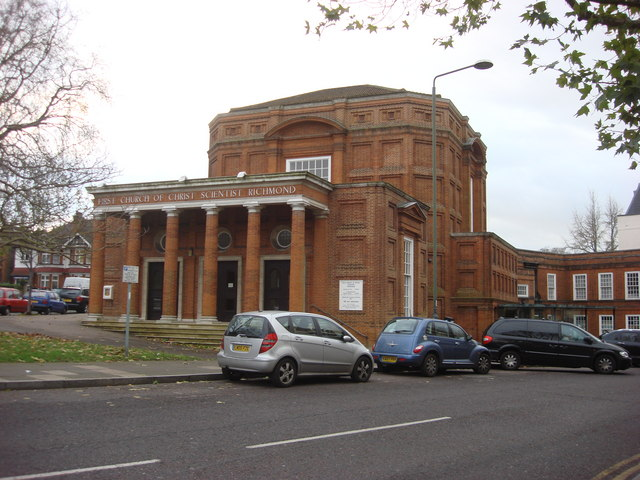
First Church of Christ, Scientist, Richmond

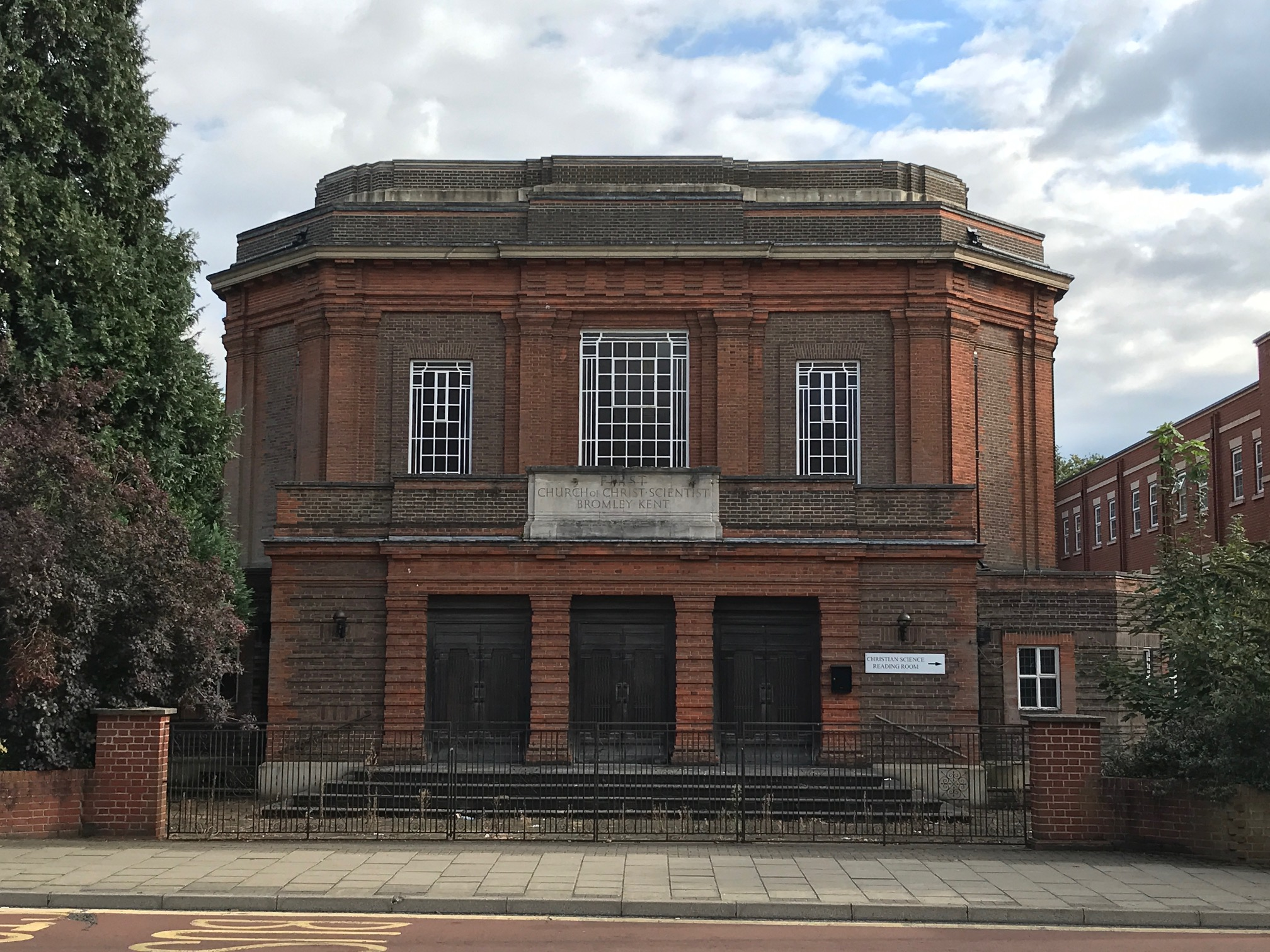
First Church of Christ, Scientist, Bromley

His works include:

- Silver Birches, a country house in Purley, Surrey (1920s)
- 8 Turner Close, Hampstead Garden Suburb (1920–1923), which was listed Grade II in 1970. Its specification and plans are held at the London Metropolitan Archives.
- First Church of Christ, Scientist, Southport, Lancashire, 1924–1933, now demolished
- First Church of Christ, Scientist, Bromley (1928–1933) at 54B Widmore Road, Bromley, London, which is Grade II listed. The Bromley Civic Society describes it as "an amazing fusion of classicism and Art Deco based on the design of a Roman tomb which accounts for the addition of a Mediterranean cypress tree as part of the integral landscaping. Special features are the classical pilasters in varying thicknesses of brick, repeated in the window tracery and the design of the carved wooden doors. Small hand-made bricks are used throughout." Historic England describes it as being "in an inventive Neo-Classical style with brickwork and doors reminiscent of Art-Deco cinemas".
- Kay & Co's Georgian-style offices (1938) in The Tything, Worcester
- The Tudor-style gatehouse (1939) at the entrance to Dunsborough Park in Ripley, Surrey, commissioned by Sir Oliver Simmonds MP
- First Church of Christ, Scientist, Richmond (1939–1953) at Sheen Road, Richmond, London
- Huddersfield House (1958–59) at 200 Strand, London WC2, the London offices of the then Huddersfield Building Society; the society later merged with other building societies to become the Yorkshire Building Society and the building is now known as Yorkshire House.

In 1913, Sinclair restored the tower at Holy Cross Church in Greenford, north-west London.

In 1950, he extended the neo-Georgian flats that had been built in 1937 in Chesterfield Gardens in Greenwich.

His design of a sophisticated air raid shelter for flats at Queen's Gate, in South Kensington, London, was published in The Builder in October 1938.

== Publications ==
- "Great Greenford, Middlesex: The Ancient Parish and the Unique Church", 12pp., published by the author, December 1912.
- "The monasteries of Bagan" in Journal of the Burma Research Society, vol.10, 1920
- "Prehistoric Blackheath" in Transactions of the Greenwich and Lewisham Antiquarian Society, issue 4 (4), p. 164. T Green & Lewis, 1948–49
- "The Black Heath" in The Journal of the London Society, issue 328, pp. 30–41, 1955

While briefly stationed in York during the Second World War, Sinclair, who was a Georgian Group member, wrote notes which, revised by the Society's architects, became the first publication of the York Georgian Society, Some Hints on the Maintenance and Repair of 17th and 18th Century Premises (1945).

== Legacy ==
Sinclair bequeathed, to the Victoria and Albert Museum, four Burmese pictorial textile hangings known as kalagas. The museum also holds three watercolours by Sinclair, two showing Burmese landscapes and one of a Burmese pagoda. After his death Mrs Mary Simpson donated on his behalf, to the Victoria and Albert Museum, an 18th- or 19th-century wooden and lacquered sculpted figure of the Buddha Shakyamuni.
