= Jesse Gibson =

British architect

Jesse Gibson (c. 1748–1828) was a British architect.

== Life ==
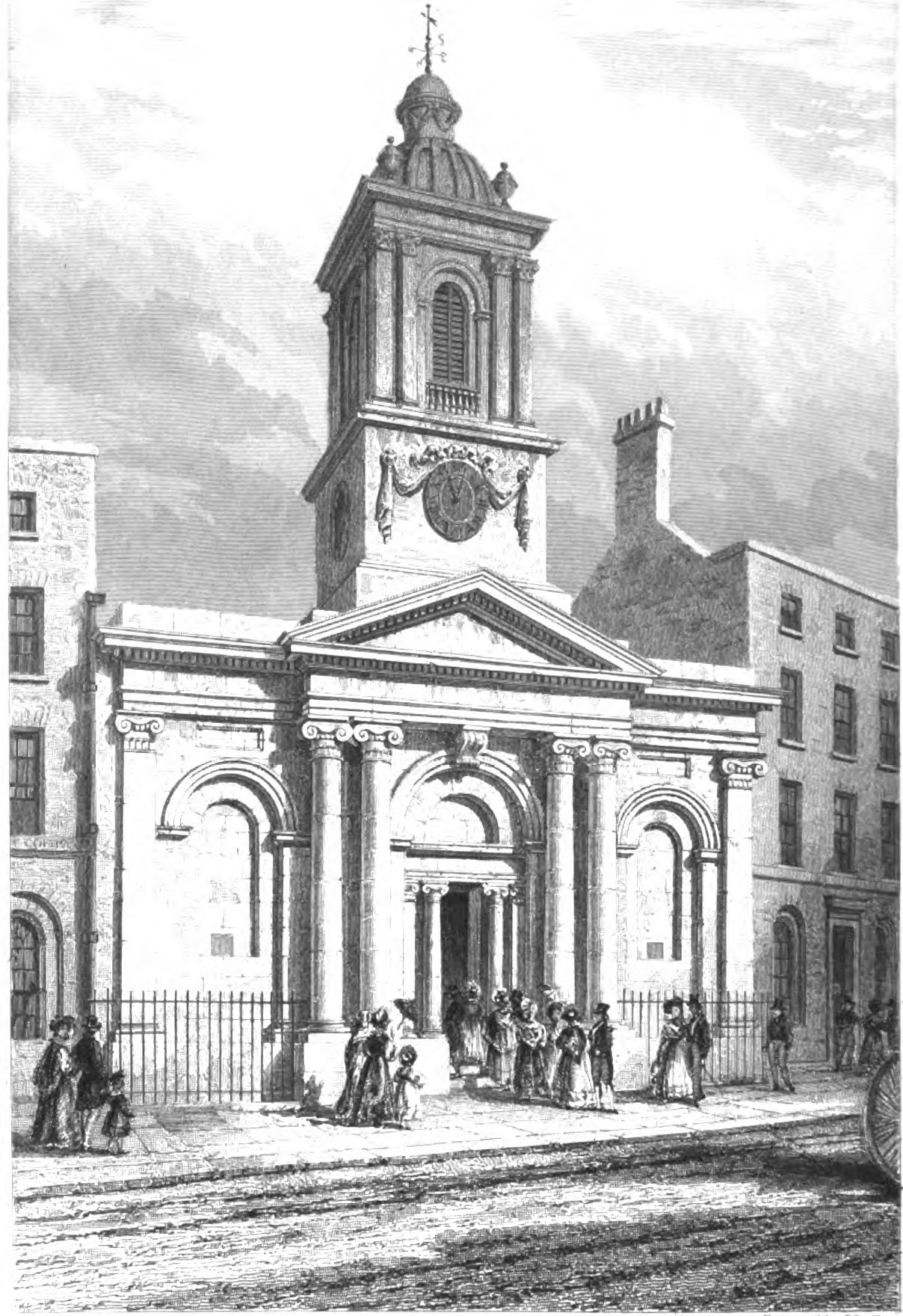
St Peter le Poer

Gibson was District Surveyor of the Eastern Division of the City of London (1774–1828), and Surveyor to the Saddlers' Company (from 1774), the Drapers' Company (from 1797) and the Trustees of the Sir John Cass Foundation.

In 1788–92 he rebuilt the church of St Peter le Poer in Broad Street in the City of London, with an unusual circular nave and a Classical facade. The interior was described in Britton's Illustrations of the Public Buildings of London as having "more the air of a lecture room than a church".

Between 1818 and 1823 Gibson designed buildings at Moneymore on the Drapers' Company's Irish estate in County Londonderry; they included the Lancasterian Schools, The Drapers' Arms and Market House.

In 1779 he leased an old mansion on the west side of Grove Road in Hackney from the Trustees of the Sir John Cass Foundation. By 1807 he had replaced the existing building – once Cass' own residence – with two new houses, one of which later became Grove House School. He lived in Grove Road until his death there in 1828.

A portrait of Gibson by T.C. Thompson was recorded as hanging in Drapers' Hall in 1839.

== Works ==
The Drapers Arms at Moneymore

- Claybury House, Essex (now London Borough of Redbridge) for James Hatch. Later formed part of Claybury Hospital.
- West Hill House, Wandsworth, Surrey, for John Anthony Rucker. The house became a hospital (now known as the Royal Hospital for Neuro-disability) in 1863, and was much enlarged later in the 19th century.
- A mausoleum in the churchyard of St. Mary's Church, Wimbledon, also for J. A. Rucker. It was later sold by Rucker's nephew to Sir Joseph Bazalgette, who is buried in it with members of his family.
- St Peter le Poer, Broad Street, London (1788–92). Demolished.
- Vintners' Company almshouses, Mile End Road, London (1802). Destroyed 1941.
- Buildings at Moneymore on the Drapers' Company estate in County Londonderry between 1818 and 1823, including the Lancasterian Schools, an inn called The Drapers' Arms and the Market House, the upper storey of which originally served as an assembly room but later housed a court. The last two buildings, along with a doctor's house, were designed as a single symmetrical composition.
- Queen Elizabeth's Almshouses, Greenwich High Road (1817).
- Saddlers Hall, Cheapside, London (1822), built following the destruction of the previous building by fire. Refaced in the 1860s and destroyed in 1940.
