= Royal Hospital for Neuro-disability =

Royal Hospital for Neuro-disability (RHN)
- Registered Charity Number: 205907
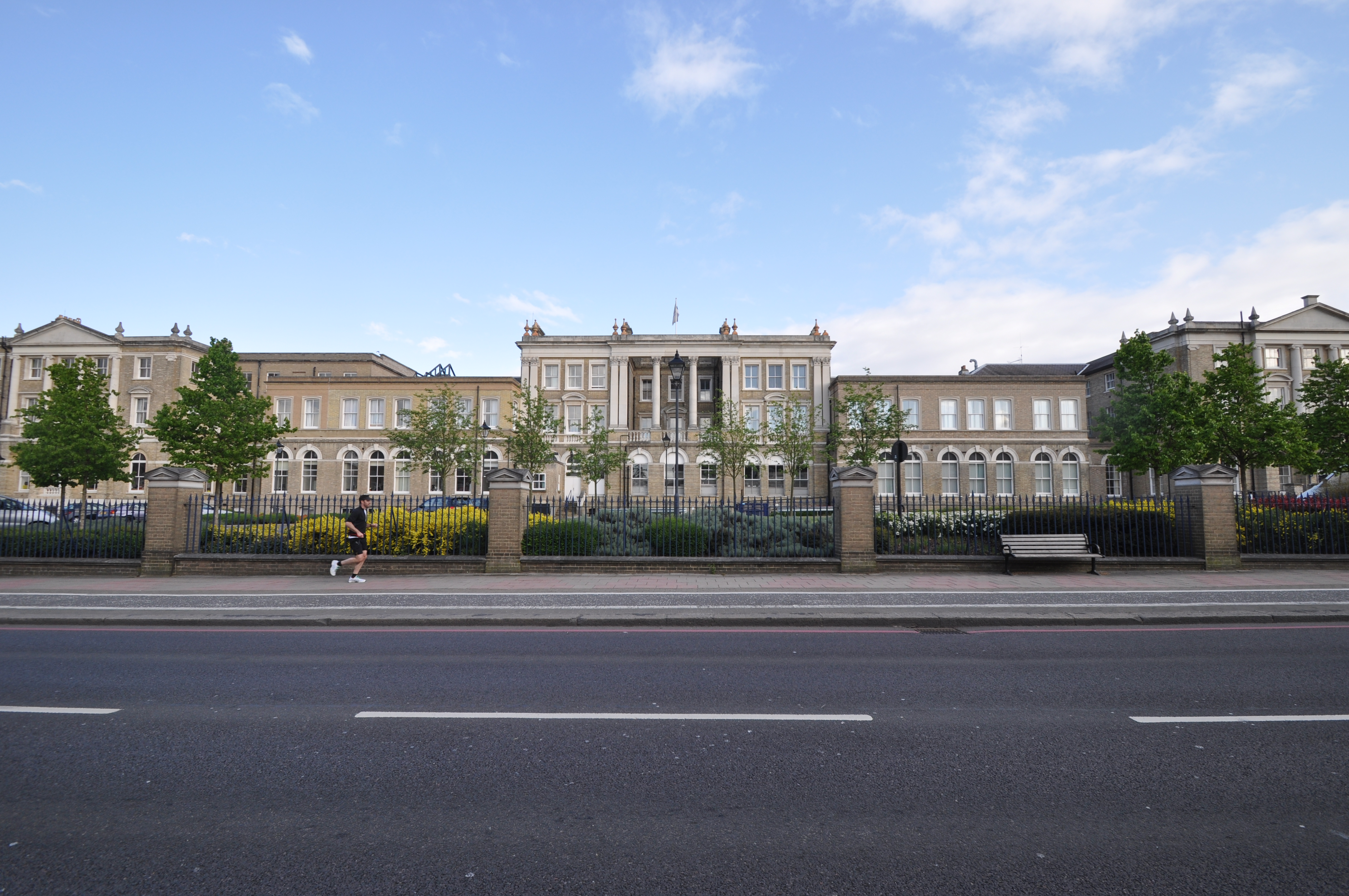
- Main buildings fronting West Hill

- Location in Wandsworth

Geography
- Location: Putney; London, SW15; United Kingdom
- Coordinates: 51.4522°N 0.2138°W

Organisation
- Care system: Charitable
- Type: Specialist
- Patron: Queen Elizabeth II

Services
- Emergency department: No
- Beds: 260
- Speciality: Neuro-disability

History
- Founded: 1854

Links
- Website: http://www.rhn.org.uk/

The Royal Hospital for Neuro-disability, in Putney, South West London, is an independent medical charity that provides rehabilitation and long-term care to people with complex neurological disabilities caused by damage to the brain or other parts of the nervous system. This damage is often caused by traffic accidents and progressive neurological conditions such as Huntington's disease and multiple sclerosis. The chief executive is Paul Allen. The hospital is a Grade II-listed building.

== History ==
The origins of the hospital lie with the foundation of The Hospital for Incurables announced at a meeting held in July 1854 at the Mansion House, chaired by the Lord Mayor of London. The hospital's founder, Andrew Reed, had a record as a practical philanthropist, having previously set up four other charities, and Charles Dickens, the celebrated author, was one of the first high-profile figures to show his support by helping Reed raise funds for it.

Its first location was a converted workhouse in Carshalton, Surrey, but as demand for its services grew, larger premises were required, and in 1857 it moved to a more spacious house in Putney. Just a few years later, more space was needed and so in 1863 the hospital relocated to its permanent home, Melrose Hall on West Hill, in Putney. Melrose Hall had originally been designed for John Anthony Rucker by the architect Jesse Gibson. It came with 24 acres (97,000 m2) of land on which, until the 1960s, the hospital ran a working farm, supplying fresh produce for patients' meals. The Hall also had extensive gardens, parts of which had been landscaped by Capability Brown.

In 1917, the hospital changed its name to the Royal Hospital and Home for Incurables, receiving its Royal Charter two years later. The hospital's name changed on a further two occasions: in 1988, when it became the Royal Hospital and Home, Putney, and again, in 1995, to the Royal Hospital for Neuro-disability.

In 1985, the RHN opened the UK's first dedicated Brain Injury Unit, and in 1987, it launched the Vegetative State Unit, the only one of its kind in the UK. The country's first Transitional Rehabilitation Unit – a unit that helps people with acquired brain injuries rehabilitate to the extent that they have regained enough independence to return to life living in the community – was opened at the RHN in 1993.

A new ventilator service was unveiled by Ade Adepitan, the former paralympic athlete, in 2013. Named the Jack Emerson Centre, the service helps provide a homely environment for rehabilitation, including specially-adapted environmental controls to increase independence for patients. The service was made possible thanks to a £500,000 donation by The Albert Reckitt Charitable Trust.

== Supporters and patrons ==
The RHN has always been helped and supported by high-profile figures, including Florence Nightingale; author Charles Dickens; poet, John Betjeman; Thomas Hardy the poet and author; Otto Goldschmidt the pianist. Queen Elizabeth II was the hospital's patron.

== Awards ==
In 2010, the RHN received two 'Innovation Awards' from the UKABIF (United Kingdom Acquired Brain Injury Forum) – Innovation by a Clinician and Innovation by a Care Provider. The London Garden Society awarded the RHN a gold medal for its gardens, in 2010 and, on 31 December 2010, an RHN occupational therapist, Helen Gill-Thwaites, received an MBE for her services to healthcare, following the development of an assessment tool at the RHN called SMART (Sensory Modality Assessment & Rehabilitation Technique) which accurately diagnoses disorders of consciousness.

== See also ==
- List of hospitals in England
