= Mortlake High Street =

Street in London, England

Coordinates: 51.46986°N 0.26085°W

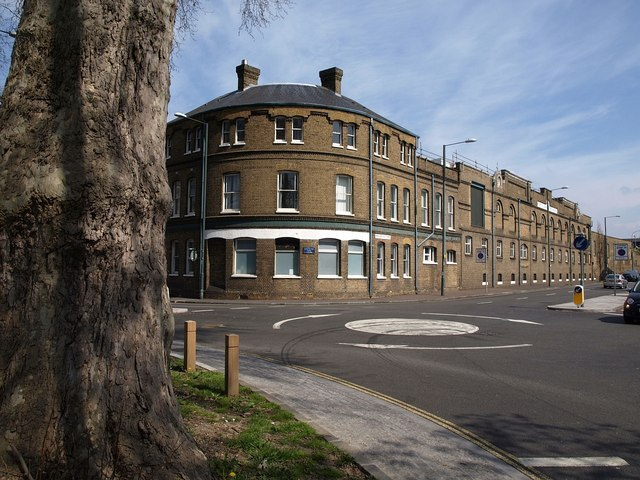
View looking eastwards from Mortlake Green including the wall of the old Mortlake Brewery

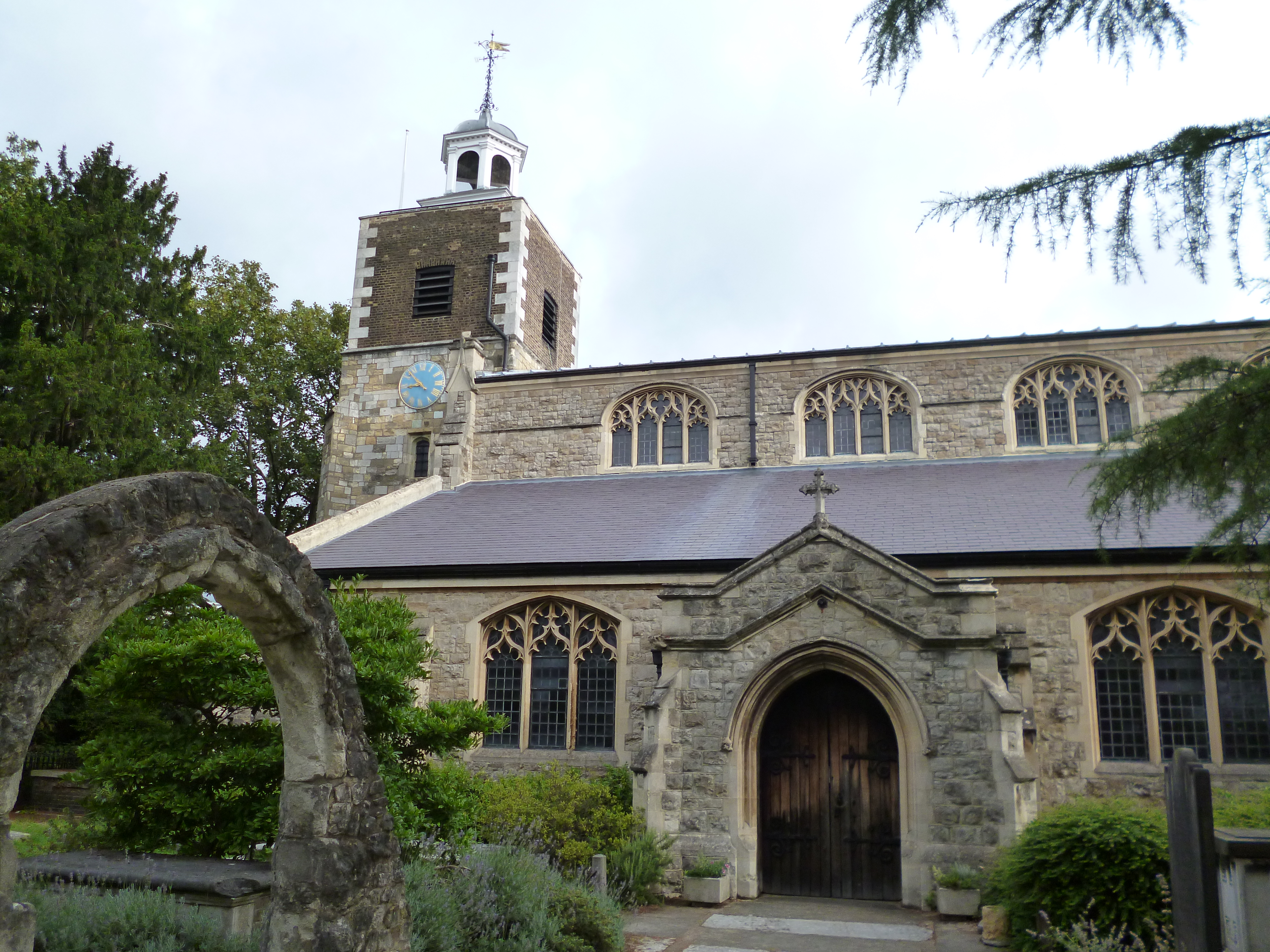
The Tudor St Mary's Church

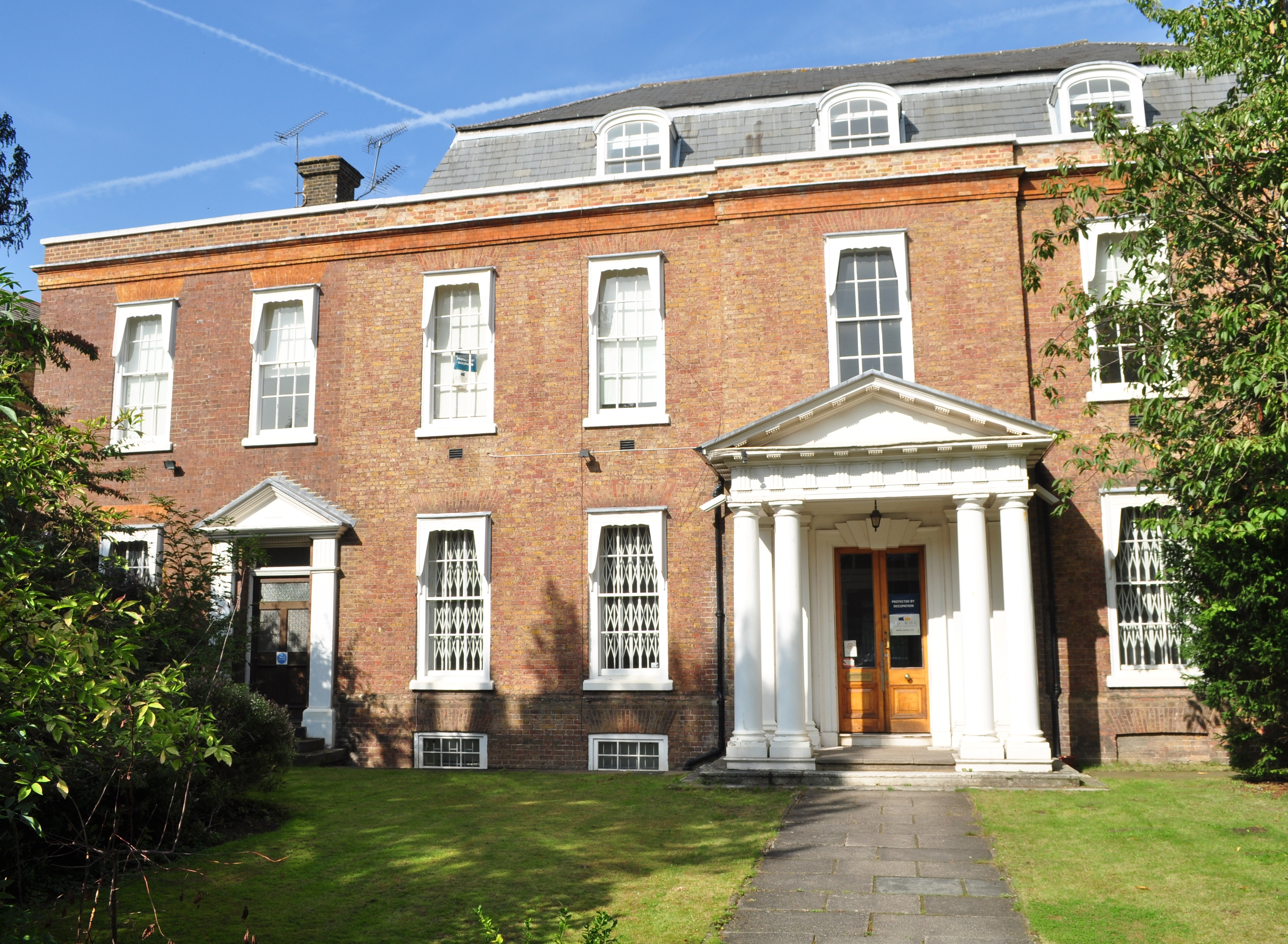
123 Mortlake High Street, an eighteenth-century building which served as the town hall of the Borough of Barnes from 1895 to 1940

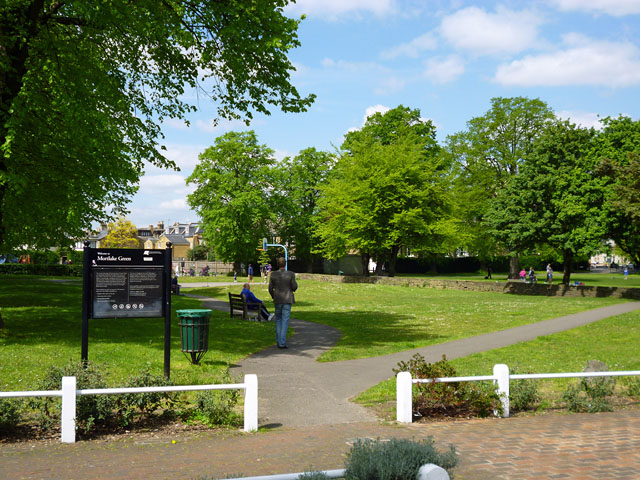
Mortlake Green at the western end of the street

Mortlake High Street is a street running through Mortlake in west London in England, United Kingdom. Located in the London Borough of Richmond, it is the historic high street of Mortlake dating back several centuries. It runs from east to west, beginning at The Terrace, Barnes and running parallel to the southern bank of the River Thames and finishing at Mortlake Green close to Mortlake railway station and the site of the former Mortlake Brewery. It forms part of the A3003 road.

Mortlake was celebrated for its tapestry works in the early modern era. The High Street provided the historic centre of the local area, only being overshadowed by the later development of East Sheen a little to the south as the formerly rural area was developed during the urbanisation of London. Mortlake Railway Station opened in 1846 to provide Mortlake with trains to Central London while Barnes Bridge railway station, a little to the east of the high street, opened in 1916 on the Hounslow Loop. The architecture of the street is a mixture of different periods, including Edwardian and later twentieth century apartments alongside buildings such as the Georgian Grade II listed house at 117 Mortlake High Street.

The Anglican church St Mary the Virgin is located on the southern side of the street. The current building dates back to the Tudor period, but an earlier chapel existed from 1348. The Prime Minister Henry Addington is buried in the churchyard. The Catholic church St Mary Magdalen is located a little further to the south on Worple Street. Built in 1852 in the Gothic Revival style it features the tomb of Sir Richard Burton, the noted explorer and writer.

The house at 123 Mortlake High Street, at the eastern end of the street, was built in 1720. Historic residents have included Lady Byron and the Irish soldier Sir Garnet Wolseley. From 1895 to 1940 it served as the town hall of Borough of Barnes, until it was bombed during the London Blitz of 1940. It was painted in the early nineteenth century by Turner, and is now Grade II* listed.

From 1901 to 1959 Barnes power station operated on the High Street. Now decommissioned, the building still stands on the street.

== See also ==
- Barnes High Street, located nearby

== Bibliography ==
- Cherry, Bridget & Pevsner, Nikolaus. London 2: South. Yale University Press, 2002.
- Fisher, Stuart. Rivers of Britain: Estuaries, Tideways, Havens, Lochs, Firths and Kyles. A & C Black, 2012.
- Sloane, Barney Hoad, Stewart. Early Modern Industry and Settlement: Excavations at George Street, Richmond, and High Street, Mortlake, in the London Borough of Richmond Upon Thames. Museum of London Archaeology Service, 2003.

Media related to Mortlake High Street at Wikimedia Commons
