= Tim Razzall, Baron Razzall =

British politician and life peer (born 1943)

The Right Honourable The Lord Razzall CBE
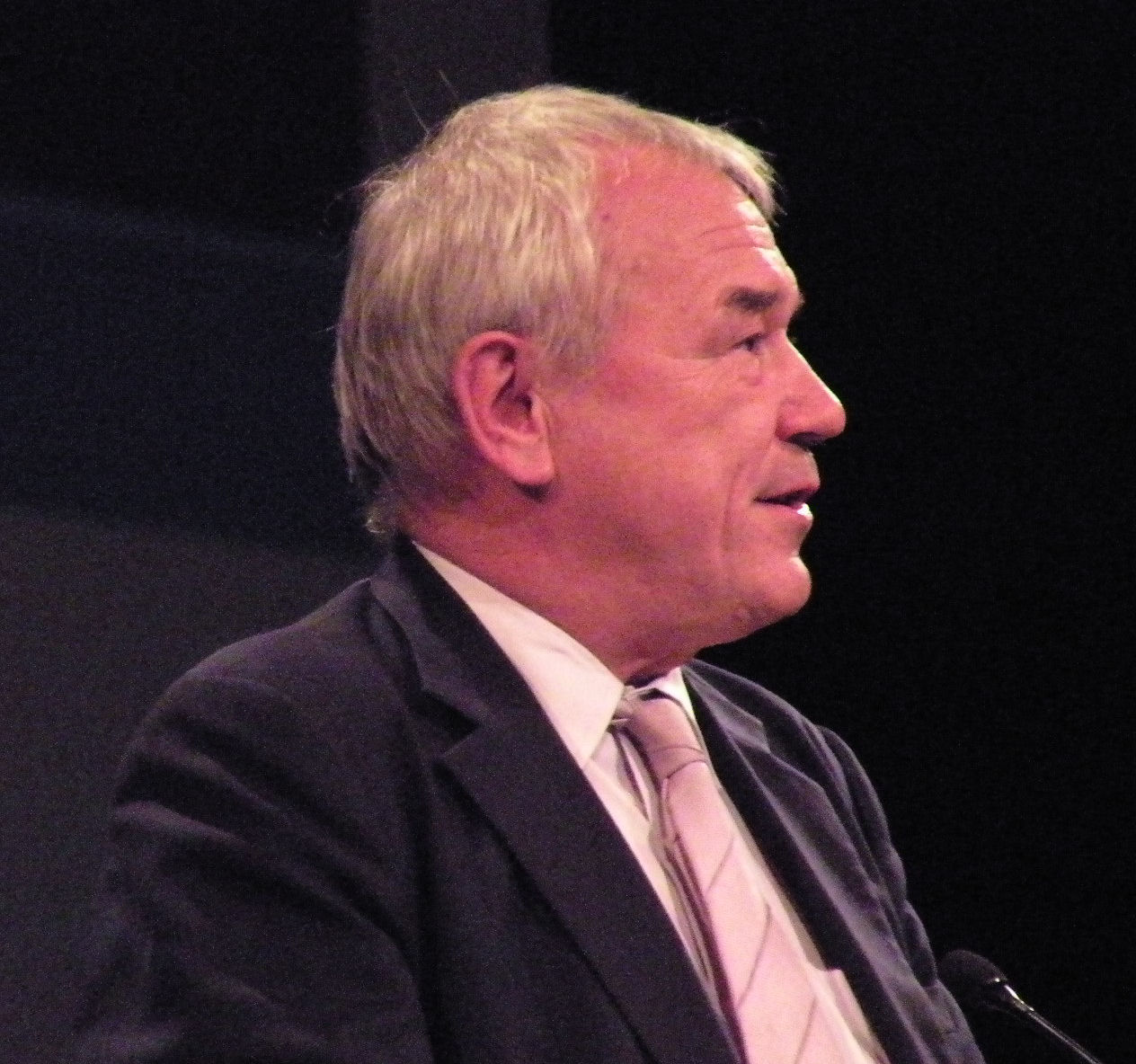

Member of the House of Lords
- Lord Temporal
- Life peerage 22 October 1997

Personal details
- Born: Edward Timothy Razzall; 12 June 1943 (age 83) Ealing, London, England
- Party: Liberal Democrats
- Spouses: Elizabeth Wilkinson (m. 1965; div. 1974) Deirdre Martineau (m. 1982; div. 2003)
- Domestic partner: Jane Bonham-Carter
- Education: St Paul's School, London
- Alma mater: University of Oxford
- Profession: Lawyer

Edward Timothy Razzall, Baron Razzall CBE (born 12 June 1943), is a British politician and life peer. A member of the Liberal Democrats, he has been a member of the House of Lords since 1997.

== Education and early life ==
Razzall is the son of Humphrey Razzall, a Liberal Party member who stood as the Liberal parliamentary candidate for Scarborough and Whitby in the 1945 general election.

Razzall was privately educated at St Paul's School, London and the University of Oxford where he was an undergraduate student at Worcester College, Oxford and representing the university at six-first class cricket matches in 1964.

== Career ==
Razzall qualified as a solicitor in 1969 and worked for Frere Cholmeley (later Frere Cholmeley Bischoff), becoming a partner in 1973, and chief executive in 1990 before leaving in 1995 to set up his own corporate finance business (Argonaut Associates). Frere Cholmeley Bischoff encountered financial difficulties and dissolved shortly after his departure, for which some blame was attributed to Razzall.

In 1974, he was elected as a councillor for Mortlake ward in the London Borough of Richmond upon Thames, which he represented for 24 years. During that time, he served as chair of Richmond Council's Policy and Resources Committee for 13 years and as deputy leader 1983–1996. He was succeeded in both roles by Serge Lourie.

In 1986, he became joint-treasurer of the Liberal Party, and then treasurer of the newly merged Liberal Democrats in 1988. He was appointed a Commander of the Order of the British Empire (CBE) in the 1993 New Year Honours and created a life peer on 22 October 1997 as Baron Razzall, of Mortlake in the London Borough of Richmond. In July 2002, he was the best man at the marriage of Charles Kennedy (the then Leader of the Liberal Democrats) to Sarah Gurling.

From 2000 to 2006, he was chair of the Liberal Democrats' Campaigns and Communications Committee. Along with Lord Rennard, he was responsible for running the Liberal Democrats' election campaigns. He stepped down from this post in May 2006, saying he wanted a change and to give his successor a chance to settle into the role before the 2010 general election.

A former House of Lords Liberal Democrat Spokesman on Trade and Industry and Treasurer of the All Party Parliamentary Intellectual Property Group in Parliament, he now serves on various parliamentary committees.

=== Controversy ===
Lord Razzall attracted criticism in 2008 when it was revealed that he and his partner, Jane Bonham Carter, a fellow life peer, had both claimed House of Lords expenses for a flat that they shared, although it was not claimed that a breach of the rules had occurred. The House of Lords expenses system was later changed to give peers a flat rate irrespective of their residence.

=== Honours and awards ===
Razzall was appointed a life peer in 1997 and a Commander of the British Empire (CBE) in 1993.

== Personal life ==
Razzall married first in 1965 (divorced 1974) Elizabeth Christina née Wilkinson, and they had a daughter, journalist Katie Razzall, and a son, James Razzall. Through his marriage in 1982 (dissolved 2003) to Deirdre Martineau née Taylor-Smith, he became stepfather to her two sons and two daughters. In 2008 he was reported to be the partner of Jane Bonham Carter, Baroness Bonham-Carter of Yarnbury. Bonham-Carter has declared the relationship in the House of Lords Register of Interests. Razzall's memoirs, Chance Encounters, were published in October 2014.

Party political offices
Preceded by Wynn Normington Hugh-Jones; Anthony Jacobs	Treasurer of the Liberal Party; 1986–1988; With: Chris Fox	Succeeded by Himself as Treasurer of the SLD
New post	Liberal Democrat Treasurer; 1988–2000	Succeeded by Reg Clark
Orders of precedence in the United Kingdom
Preceded by The Lord Hunt of Wirral	Gentlemen; The Lord Razall	Followed by The Lord Brooke of Alverthorpe
