= Mortlake Brewery =

Former brewery in London

Coordinates: 51.47048°N 0.26745°W

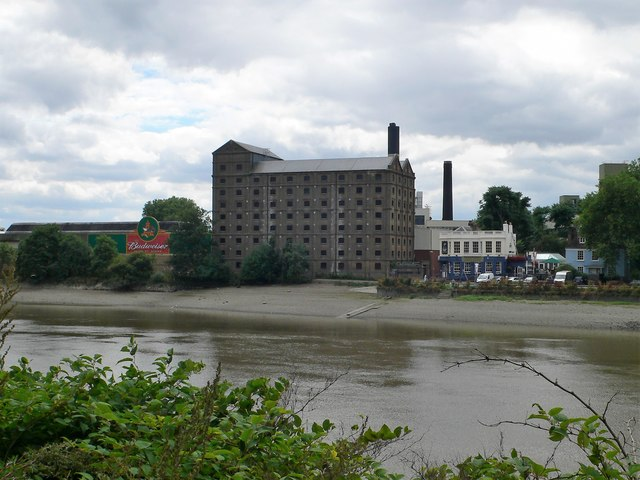
Mortlake Brewery as seen from across the Thames

Mortlake Brewery or Stag Brewery is a former brewery on the South Bank of the Thames in Mortlake.

== History ==
Mortlake Brewery began as part of a monastery, with evidence that brewing occurred as early as 1487. Commercial brewing likely started in the 18th century with a mention of two local small breweries on site by 1765. The two small breweries were consolidated into a single Mortlake Brewery in 1811. The brewery expanded through the 1850s and supplied the British army in India with India Pale Ale. The brewery was acquired by James Watney & Co. in 1889. Three decades after the 1959 demolition of Watney's Stag Brewery in Victoria, the name was given to Mortlake Brewery in 1989. The brewery was bombed during the Second World War with record of several hits on the site. Anheuser-Busch began using the brewery for the brewing of Budweiser in 1995 but left the site in 2011. The site closed entirely in 2015.

The land of the brewery then came into council ownership, with plans for a redevelopment of the site. It was also temporarily used as a film studio where scenes for Indiana Jones and the Dial of Destiny were filmed.

The oldest standing sections of the brewery include those fronting Mortlake High Street. These sections are dated to around 1869. The large Maltings building was constructed in 1903. Other 19th century sections were demolished to make way for more modern industrial equipment in the 1970s.

== Redevelopment ==
In 2016, consultation for the redevelopment of the site began, with planning permission being granted in 2021. The council approved the applications in 2024. The plans included 1,068 homes as well as a secondary school although plans for the school were eventually axed.
