= Monroe Palmer, Baron Palmer of Childs Hill =

British politician (born 1938)

The Right Honourable The Lord Palmer of Childs Hill OBE FCA
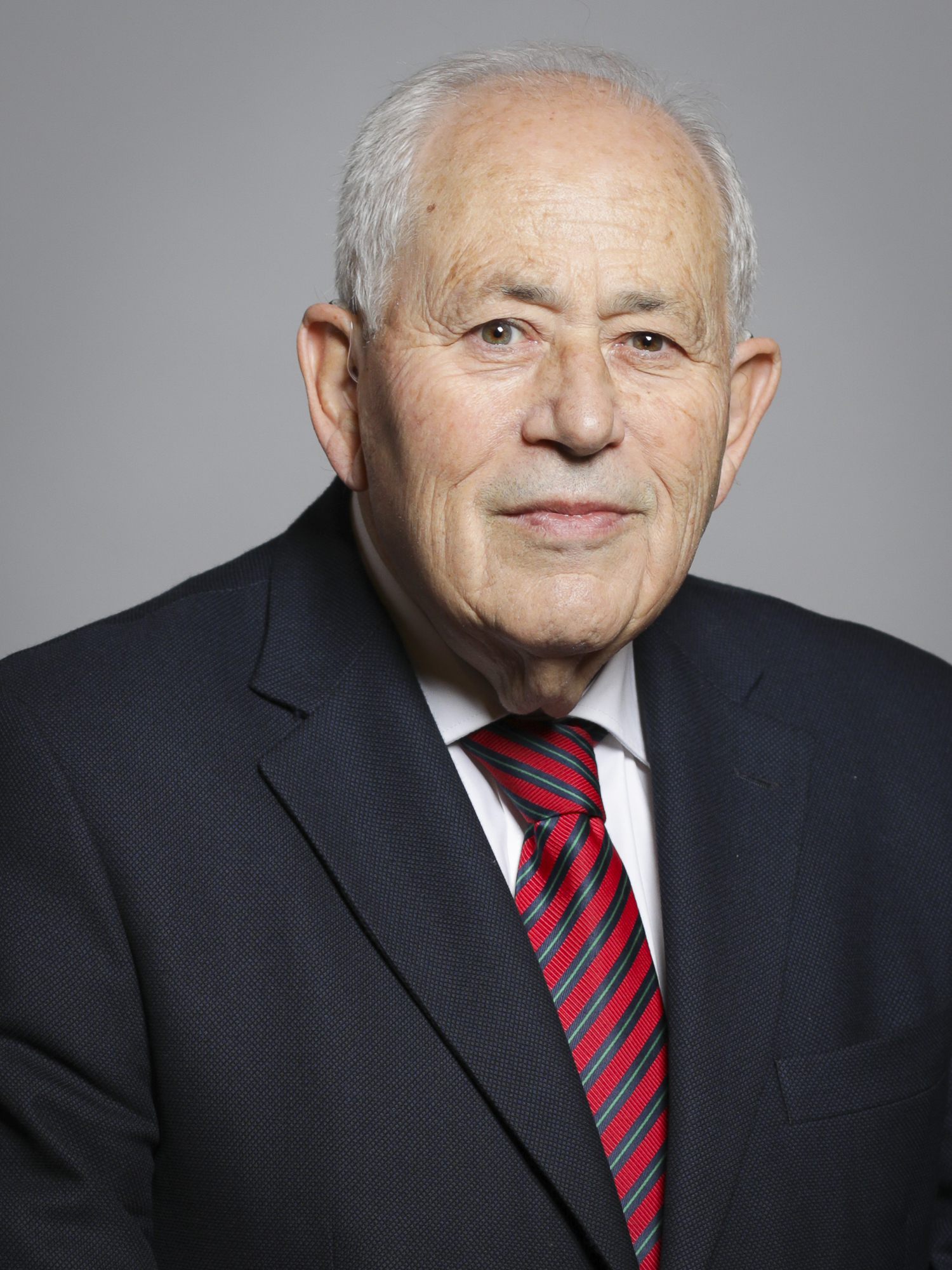
- Official portrait, 2019

Member of the House of Lords
- Lord Temporal
- Life peerage 17 January 2011

Personal details
- Born: 30 November 1938 (age 87)
- Party: Liberal Democrats
- Occupation: Politician

Monroe Edward Palmer, Baron Palmer of Childs Hill (born 30 November 1938), is a British Liberal Democrat politician and life peer in the House of Lords.

Born on 30 November 1938, Palmer was Liberal Party treasurer between 1971 and 1983. He was appointed an Officer of the Order of the British Empire (OBE) in the 1982 New Year Honours. He contested the Hendon South constituency at the 1979, 1983 and 1987 general elections for the Liberal party, and was joint treasurer of the Liberal parliamentary party from 1977 to 1983. Following the formation of the Liberal Democrats, he contested Hastings and Rye at the 1992 and 1997 general elections.

Palmer first stood as a candidate for Barnet London Borough Council in Childs Hill ward in 1968, first elected 1986, stood down in 1994, returned 1998 and finally retired in 2014. He was chair of the audit committee for a council with a £500 million net annual expenditure. On 19 November 2010, it was announced that Palmer would be created a life peer. He was created Baron Palmer of Childs Hill, of Childs Hill in the London Borough of Barnet on 17 January 2011.

Monroe Palmer is a Chartered Accountant and a former senior partner in general practice.

In the House of Lords, Palmer spoke, on defence procurement, housing, and veterans until May 2014. He serves as a spokesperson in the House of Lords on Work & Pensions. His work includes a focus on peace in the Middle East and matters concerning the UK Jewish Community. Palmer is a Vice President of the Jewish Leadership Council.

He is married to Susette, who was a councillor for Child's Hill from 1994 to 2014. They have three children and seven grandchildren.

== Elections contested ==
Constituency	Year	Number of votes	% of votes	Position	Winner	Ref.
Hendon South	1979	5,799	15.32	3rd of 5	Conservative	
Hendon South	1983	10,682	30.34	2nd of 3	Conservative	
Hendon South	1987	8.217	23.6	2nd of 3	Conservative	
Hastings and Rye	1992	18,939	35.2	2nd of 5	Conservative	
Hastings and Rye	1997	13,717	28.0	3rd of 7	Labour	

Party political offices
Preceded by Philip Watkins	Treasurer of the Liberal Party; 1977 – 1983; With: Rhys Lloyd	Succeeded by Wynn Normington Hugh-Jones; Anthony Jacobs
Orders of precedence in the United Kingdom
Preceded by The Lord Empey	Gentlemen; Baron Palmer of Childs Hill	Followed by The Lord Stoneham of Droxford
