= Philip Watkins =

English accountant and politician (1930–1995)

Philip George Watkins (5 November 1930 – 1 June 1995) was an English accountant and Liberal Party politician. He was for many years treasurer of the Liberal Party. During the 1970s, he had to endure both the spotlight of the media during the Jeremy Thorpe affair and an investigation into the finances of the party under Thorpe's leadership.

== Family, education and career ==
Philip Watkins was born in Bristol, one of a pair of twin boys. He was orphaned in childhood and he and his twin, Bob, and their brother David were looked after by an uncle and aunt. He read Greats at Brasenose College, Oxford and was both treasurer and president of the Oxford University Liberal Club in 1951. After leaving university Watkins went into accountancy, running his own firm.

== Religion ==
Watkins was a lifelong and committed Christian, a devout Anglican and a member of the Synod.

== Politics ==
=== Parliamentary candidate ===
Watkins fought six general elections as a Liberal between 1959 and 1974. He contested Bridgwater in Somerset in 1959, 1964, and 1966. Then he switched his attention to North Dorset which had been Frank Byers' old seat from 1945 – 1950. He kept the Liberals in second place on each occasion but never really got close to winning the seat.

=== Party official ===
However, despite his inability to get into the House of Commons, by 1973 Watkins was being described in the press as one of the party's most powerful men. Devotedly loyal to Jeremy Thorpe, Watkins stayed unswervingly Liberal and took on other responsibilities in the party. In 1969 he was chairman of the party's finance and administration board before being elected treasurer of the party, in which capacity he served from 1972 to 1977. He was vice-president of the Liberal Party from 1977 until the merger with the SDP in 1988.

=== Treasurer ===
By most accounts, Watkins was an effective treasurer, applying rigorous discipline to the party's expenditure and accounting. The problem Watkins had was that he was never made fully aware of all the income to the party and in particular to certain special funds arranged by Jeremy Thorpe, the details of which were the subject of a special investigation by the party. However it has been alleged that Watkins' approach to this issue was to accept the status quo rather than probe too deeply and run the risk of finding out what was under the stones. A more charitable explanation was that Watkins found it hard to accept that Liberals, especially those to whom he had given his loyalty, did not share his own high standards. It also seems that Watkins disliked the process of raising funds for the party, particularly from business and business people. One senior party official who worked closely with him recalled that Watkins loathed fund-raising and had once sent back a cheque enclosing a rare and unsolicited donation from the company Cadburys with a statement that the Liberal Party did not accept contributions from business.

=== Other appointments ===
Watkins was member of the National Liberal Club for many years, having first joined as an undergraduate. He was elected a vice-chairman of the Club not long before his death. He served on the executive of the London Liberal Party, being elected president in 1987. He also took on roles in Liberal International, the Liberal Parliamentary Candidates Association and the Electoral Reform Society. He was a founder member of the Liberal Friends of Israel.

== Death ==
Philip Watkins died aged 64 years at Trinity Hospice, Clapham Common on 1 June 1995. He was unmarried and had been cared for during his illness by his brothers.

Party political offices
Preceded by Frank Medlicott	Treasurer of the Liberal Party; 1972 – 1977	Succeeded by Rhys Lloyd; Monroe Palmer
