= Rhys Lloyd, Baron Lloyd of Kilgerran =

Welsh politician (1907-1991)

The Right Honourable The Lord Lloyd of Kilgerran CBE QC JP

Treasurer of the Liberal Party
- In office 1977–1983

President of the Liberal Party
- In office 1973–1974

President of the Welsh Liberal Party
- In office 1971–1974

Personal details
- Born: Rhys Gerran Lloyd; 12 August 1907
- Died: 30 January 1991 (aged 83)

Rhys Gerran Lloyd, Baron Lloyd of Kilgerran (12 August 1907 – 30 January 1991) was a Welsh Liberal Party politician.

Son of James G. Lloyd of Kilgerran, Pembrokeshire, Lloyd studied at Sloane School and Selwyn College, Cambridge, before taking a teaching post at Bembridge School on the Isle of Wight, where he involved himself in the trusteeship of various organisations relating to John Ruskin. He became a barrister at Gray's Inn in 1939, specialising in patent law, then became a Queen's Counsel in 1961. During the Second World War he served as a government scientific researcher.

Lloyd was made a Justice of the Peace for the county of Surrey (where by 1983 he lived at Esher) in 1953 and appointed a Commander of the Order of the British Empire (CBE) in the 1953 Coronation Honours.

Lloyd stood unsuccessfully for the Liberal Party in Anglesey at the 1959 general election, becoming President of the Welsh Liberal Party from 1971 to 1974, and of the British Liberal Party in 1973–74. On 29 June 1973, he was created a life peer as Baron Lloyd of Kilgerran, of Llanwenog in the County of Cardigan, and in the Lords, he focussed on developments in patent and copyright law. From 1977 to 1983, he was joint treasurer of the party, with Monroe Palmer.

He married in 1940 Phyllis, daughter of Ronald Shepherd of Chilworth, Southampton, Hampshire, with whom he had two daughters. Lord Lloyd died aged 83 in 1991, with his wife outliving him and dying on 11 September 2006 aged 99.

Party political offices
Preceded by David Rees-Williams	President of the Welsh Liberal Party; 1971–1974	Succeeded by Geraint Howells
Preceded by Trevor Jones	President of the Liberal Party; 1973–1974	Succeeded by Arthur Holt
Preceded by Philip Watkins	Treasurer of the Liberal Party; 1977 – 1983; With: Monroe Palmer	Succeeded by Wynn Normington Hugh-Jones; Anthony Jacobs
