= Wynn Hugh-Jones =

British diplomat and politician (1923–2019)

Sir Wynn Normington Hugh-Jones, LVO, (1 November 1923 – 5 July 2019), sometimes known as Sir Hugh Jones, was a British diplomat, administrator and Liberal Party official.

Hugh-Jones was born at Llangollen in north Wales where his father was Headmaster of the County School. He was educated at Ludlow Grammar School and went up to Selwyn College, Cambridge in 1941 where he got his degree in natural sciences in just two years. During the rest of Second World War he served as a Signals Officer in the Royal Air Force. He returned after the war to complete a second degree at Cambridge, in history.

Jones entered the Diplomatic Service in 1947 and served in various overseas and London postings until 1971 when he was seconded first to the Lord President's Office and then the Cabinet Office to assist in the Great Debate which preceded the United Kingdom's entry to the European Economic Community and to help steer the European Communities Bill through Parliament. He left government service in 1973 to become the Director General of the English Speaking Union (ESU).

Jones' father had been a Liberal and his political sympathies were always towards the Liberal Party, although as a public servant or ESU administrator he could not participate in national political activity. However, in 1977 he was appointed Secretary General of the Liberal Party and served in this post until 1983. From 1984-87 he was Joint Honorary Treasurer of the party. He steered the party through the period of the Lib-Lab Pact (1977–78) under the leadership of David Steel and during the formation of the Alliance with the newly founded Social Democratic Party, playing a key role in the seats' negotiations which so bedevilled the parties. Financially the late 1970s and early 1980s were difficult for the Liberal Party. Jones was forced to describe the party's position as being on a knife edge so he must have taken the Treasurer's post with misgivings in 1984.

Having been appointed a Member of the Royal Victorian Order MVO (LVO from 1985) in 1961, he was knighted for political and public service in the 1984 New Year Honours List.

After retirement Sir Hugh, as a resident of Avebury in Wiltshire became chairman of the Avebury in Danger campaign (now the Avebury Society) which fought to preserve Avebury as a World Heritage Site and living village. He also undertook lecture tours of the United States on east-west relations and other international and political questions. He separated from his first wife, Ann with whom he had three children and later married Oswynne Jordan.

Jones published the first volume of his autobiography, Diplomacy to Politics by way of the Jungle in 2002 and the second Campaigning Face to Face in 2007. He died in July 2019 at the age of 95.

Party political offices
Preceded by Rhys Lloyd; Monroe Palmer	Treasurer of the Liberal Party; 1983 – 1986; With: Anthony Jacobs	Succeeded by Chris Fox; Tim Razzall
