= Ranbir Singh Suri, Baron Suri =

British journalist

The Right Honourable The Lord Suri
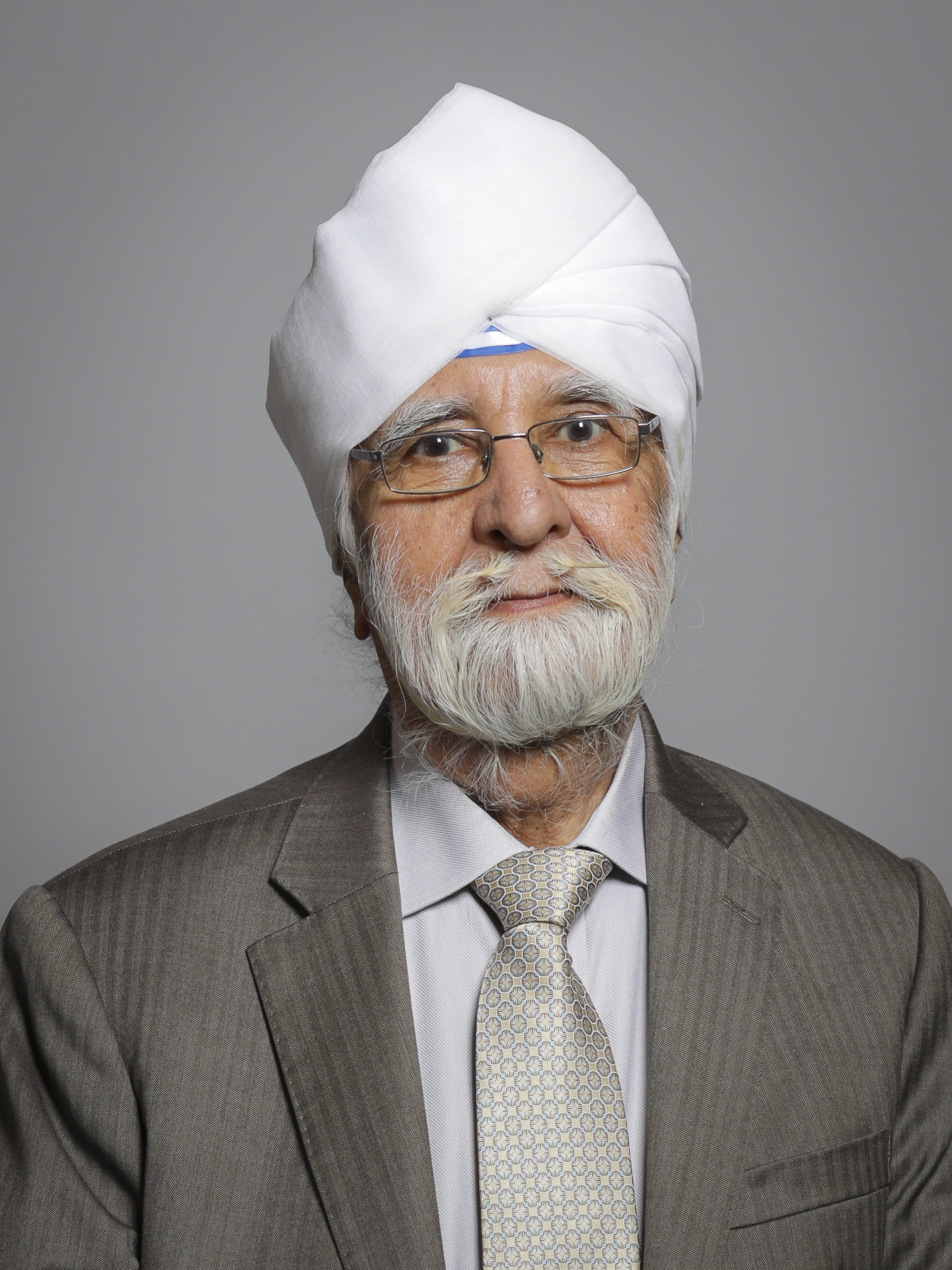

Member of the House of Lords
- Lord Temporal
- Life peerage 11 September 2014 – 9 March 2026

Personal details
- Born: 10 February 1935 (age 91)

Ranbir Singh Suri, Baron Suri (born 10 February 1935) is a Conservative life peer in the United Kingdom's House of Lords, nominated in 2014. He is a businessman and formerly the general secretary of the Board of British Sikhs. He was made a Life Peer by Queen Elizabeth II on 15 September 2014, as the Baron Suri, of Ealing in the London Borough of Ealing.

== Political donations ==
Suri donated £300,000 to the Conservative Party between 2004 and 2014.

Orders of precedence in the United Kingdom
Preceded by The Lord Fox	Gentlemen; Baron Suri	Followed by The Lord Goddard of Stockport
