= Christopher Fox, Baron Fox =

British Liberal Democrat Politician

The Right Honourable The Lord Fox
- Official portrait, 2017

Chief Executive of the Liberal Democrats
- In office 2009–2011
- Preceded by: Chris Rennard
- Succeeded by: Tim Gordon

Member of the House of Lords
- Lord Temporal
- Life peerage 11 September 2014

Personal details
- Born: 27 September 1957 (age 69) Surrey, England
- Party: Liberal Democrats
- Spouse: Essie Fox
- Children: 1
- Education: Imperial College London

Christopher Francis Fox, Baron Fox (born 27 September 1957), is a British Liberal Democrat politician.

== Education and early career ==
Fox grew up in Herefordshire, attending Leominster Grammar School. He went on to study at Imperial College London, graduating with a Bachelor of Science (BSc) in chemistry. During his time at university Fox spent a year as President of the Imperial College Students' Union.

Fox's professional career began with engineering roles in the petroleum and nuclear industries. From 1998 to 2005 he worked at Tate & Lyle, before joining Smiths Group and, later, GKN, as Group Director of Communications.

Fox was Chief Executive of the Liberal Democrats (UK) from 2009 and 2011. In this role he managed the party through the 2010 General Election and the beginning of the Cameron-Clegg Coalition Government. He has been credited with overseeing a major reorganisation of the party's campaigns staff, moving the party out of its historic Cowley Street HQ to more modern offices on Great George Street, and introducing a new online election database system.

Since 2017, Fox has been a patron of children's charity, WAVE Trust.

== House of Lords ==
Chris Fox was created a life peer as Baron Fox, of Leominster in the County of Herefordshire, on 11 September 2014, following nomination by Liberal Democrat Leader and Deputy Prime Minister, Nick Clegg.

Since becoming a Member of the House of Lords, Lord Fox has taken an interest in policy relating to business, industry, science and technology. From June 2015 he was a member of the Lords Science and Technology Committee, in July 2019 changing to be a member of the Economic Affairs Committee.

In June 2017, Lord Fox was appointed Liberal Democrat Lords Spokesperson for Business, Energy and Industrial Strategy in the House of Lords.

A critic of Brexit, Lord Fox was one of several Peers to oppose the UK Government's post-referendum negotiations and legislative agenda. In 2020, he described the Government's Internal Market Bill as "illegal". In 2023, Fox led parliamentary opposition to the Retained EU Law Bill, leading to concessions from the government.

He is Vice President of the German-British Chamber of Industry and Commerce, and an Executive member of the British-American Parliamentary Group.

In May 2020 The Daily Telegraph reported that Fox had furloughed himself under the government financed COVID support scheme in his single employee company, Vulpes Advisory, which had a £100,000 cash balance, as well as claiming his £162 daily allowance for Lords Zoom video meetings attendance. The newspaper critically characterised this as a "double dip into the taxpayers' pocket", and some MPs said this was "milking the taxpayer". Fox apologised for his "error in judgment" and promised to repay the furlough money.

Party political offices
Preceded by Wynn Normington Hugh-Jones; Anthony Jacobs	Treasurer of the Liberal Party; 1986 – 1988; With: Tim Razzall	Succeeded by Tim Razzall (Treasurer of the SLD)
Orders of precedence in the United Kingdom
Preceded by The Lord Farmer	Life Peer; Baron Fox	Followed by The Lord Suri
