= Barnes power station =

20th-century British power station

- Country: England
- Location: Barnes, London
- Coordinates: 51°28′13″N 00°15′29″W
- Status: Decommissioned
- Construction began: 1899
- Commission date: 1901
- Decommission date: 1959
- Owners: Barnes Urban District (1901–1948); British Electricity Authority (1948–1955); Central Electricity Authority (1955–1957); Central Electricity Generating Board (1958–1959)
- Operator: As owner

Thermal power station
- Primary fuel: Coal
- Turbine technology: Steam turbines
- Cooling source: Tidal river water

Power generation
- Units operational: 2 × 1.5 MW, 1 × 3.5 MW
- Make and model: English Electric 1.5 MW and 3.5 MW
- Nameplate capacity: 6.5 MW
- Annual net output: 4.354 GWh (1924)

Barnes power station supplied electricity to the urban district of Barnes in south west London from 1901 to 1959. It was owned and operated by Barnes District Council until the nationalisation of the British electricity supply industry in 1948. The power station was decommissioned in 1959 and the building has been reused.

== History ==
In 1898 Barnes Urban District Council applied for a provisional order under the Electric Lighting Acts to generate and supply electricity to the district. The Barnes Electric Lighting Order 1898 was granted by the Board of Trade and was confirmed by Parliament through the Electric Lighting Orders Confirmation (No. 4) Act 1898 (61 & 62 Vict. c. xl). The power station was built in Mortlake High Street (51°28′13″N 0°15′29″W) and first supplied electricity in May 1901.

== Equipment specification ==
The original plant at power station comprised five reciprocating engines driven by steam from coal-fired boilers:

- 2 × 150 kW
- 2 × 300 kW
- 1 × 600 kW

These gave a total direct current generating capacity of 1,500 kW.

Following the First World War a 1,500 kW turbo-alternator was installed; this generated an alternating current supply.

By 1954 the plant comprised:

- Boilers:
  - 2 × Babcock and Wilcox 20,000 lb/h coal-fired boilers operating at 200 psi and 630 °F (2.5 kg/s, 13.8 bar and 332 °C),
  - 1 × Stirling 40,000 lb/h coal-fired boiler operating at 210 psi and 680 °F (5.04 kg/s, 14.5 bar and 360 °C)
- Turbo-alternators:
  - 2 × English Electric 1.5 MW turbo-alternators, running at 3,000 rpm
  - 1 × English Electric 3.5 MW turbo-alternators, running at 3,000 rpm

Cooling water was taken from the River Thames.

Electricity was supplied to customers at 210 and 420 volts DC.

== Operations ==
Operational data for the early years of operation was as follows:

Barnes power station operational data 1912–34
Year	No. of Consumers	No. of Public lamps	Connection on system, kW	Electricity sold, MWh	Load factor, per cent
1912	2,886	584	2,873	1,312.9	19.5
1919	3,764	602	4,454	2,633.8	28.8
1920	3,900	607	4,693	2,063.3	21.0
1921			6,000	2,771.6	24.4
1922			7,314	3,354.3	24.4
1923			7,824	3,754.6	24.9
1924	4,879	678	8,000	4,354.2	22.0

The data demonstrates the growth in number of consumers, lamps and the amount of current sold.

=== Operating data 1921–23 ===
The operating data for the period 1921–23 is as follows:

Barnes power station operating data 1921–23
Electricity Use	Units	Year		
Electricity Use	Units	1921	1922	1923
Lighting and domestic use	MWh	1,175	1,320	1,574
Public lighting use	MWh	317	324	335
Traction	MWh	–	–	–
Power use	MWh	1,279	1,710	1,845
Total use	MWh	2,772	3,354	3,755
Load
Maximum load	kW	1,475	1,750	2,000
Financial
Revenue from sales of current	£	–	42,240	39,934
Surplus of revenue over expenses	£	–	18,314	18,297

The data demonstrates the yearly growth of demand and use of electricity.

Under the terms of the Electricity (Supply) Act 1926 (16-17 Geo. 5 c. 51) the Central Electricity Board (CEB) was established in 1926. The CEB identified high efficiency ‘selected’ power stations that would supply electricity most effectively. The CEB also constructed the national grid (1927–33) to connect power stations within a region. Barnes power station was electrically connected to Hammersmith power station by three underground 6.6 kV circuits.

=== Operating data 1937 and 1946 ===
Barnes power station operating data for 1937 and 1946 is given below:

Barnes power station operating data, 1937 and 1946
Year	Load factor per cent	Max output load, MW	Electricity supplied, MWh	Total connections on system, kW	Customers
1937	35.2	5,976	16,233.8 purchased from the CEB, none generated	28,278	11,085
1946	–	5,360	2,858.4	–	–

The British electricity supply industry was nationalised in 1948 under the provisions of the Electricity Act 1947 (10-11 Geo. 6 c. 54). The Barnes electricity undertaking was abolished, ownership of Barnes power station was vested in the British Electricity Authority, and subsequently the Central Electricity Authority and the Central Electricity Generating Board (CEGB). At the same time the electricity distribution and sales responsibilities of the Barnes electricity undertaking were transferred to the London Electricity Board (LEB).

=== Operating data 1954–58 ===
Operating data for the period 1954–58 is shown in the table:

Barnes power station operating data, 1954–58
Year	Running hours	Maximum output capacity, MW	Electricity supplied, GWh	Thermal efficiency per cent
1954	419	6	1,395	10.00
1955	346	6	960	8.43
1956	471	6	1,118	9.98
1957	113	6	319	5.40
1958	200	6	700	7.86

The data demonstrates the low utilization of the plant during its final years.

Amount of electricity, in MWh, sent out by Barnes power station throughout its operational life

== Closure ==
Barnes power station was decommissioned on 1959. The equipment was removed and the buildings were redeveloped, and are called 'The Old Power Station'.

== See also ==
- Timeline of the UK electricity supply industry
- List of power stations in England
