= Essie Fox =

English novelist

- Born: c. 1959/1960
- Education: University of Sheffield
- Spouse: Christopher Fox
- Website: essiefox.com

Essie Fox (born c. 1959/1960) is an English gothic historical novelist. Her novels include The Somnambulist (2012), which was a More4 TV Book Club pick and shortlisted for a National Book Award, and The Fascination (2023), which became a Sunday Times bestseller.

== Early life ==
Fox grew up in Leominster, Herefordshire. Fox attended the Minster School, completing her schooling in 1978. She graduated with a degree from the University of Sheffield in 1981.

== Career ==
Fox began her career as an editorial assistant at George Allen & Unwin and The Telegraph, and also worked as an illustrator. She also ran a blog titled Virtual Victorian. Fox's debut novel The Somnambulist was published in 2011 via Orion Books. The novel is a Victorian gothic mystery set around Wilton's Music Hall. The Somnambulist was selected as one of the Best Reads of 2012 on the More4 programme TV Book Club and shortlisted for the People's Book Prize and New Writer at the National Book Awards.

Fox reunited with Orion for the publication of her next two novels Elijah's Mermaid and The Goddess and the Thief. Elijah's Mermaid was a 2013 LoveReading Book of the Month. This was followed by The Last Days of Leda Grey, about an Edwardian actress, in 2016.

In 2022, Orenda Books acquired the rights to publish Fox's gothic novel The Fascination in 2023. The Fascination became a Sunday Times bestseller.

Orenda Books then signed Fox's sixth novel Dangerous, a thriller about the poet Lord Byron, for publication in 2025. Dangerous was named one of the best historical fiction books of 2025 by The Sunday Times.

== Personal life ==
Fox is married to Chris Fox of the Liberal Democrats.

== Bibliography ==
- The Somnambulist (2011)
- Elijah's Mermaid (2012)
- The Goddess and the Thief (2013)
- The Last Days of Leda Grey (2016)
- The Fascination (2023)
- Dangerous (2025)
- Catherine: A Retelling of Wuthering Heights (2026)
