= 123 Mortlake High Street =

Municipal building in London, England

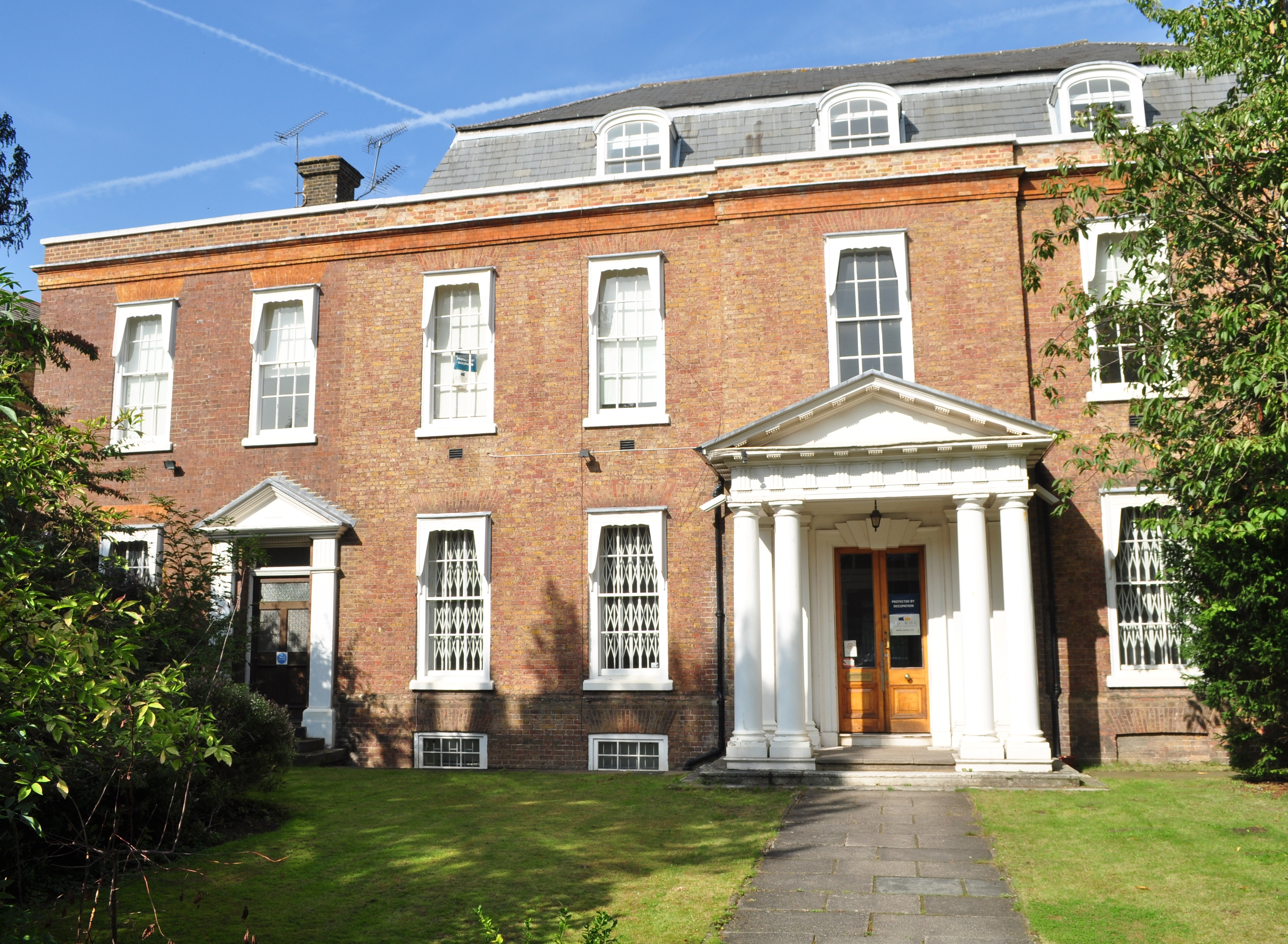
- Interactive map of the 123 Mortlake High Street area

General information
- Type: Residential, but converted for office use
- Architectural style: Georgian
- Location: Mortlake High Street, London SW14, England
- Coordinates: 51.4704°N 0.2574°W
- Construction started: c. 1720

Listed Building – Grade II*
- Official name: Limes House and Forecourt Piers
- Designated: 25 October 1951
- Reference no.: 1065428

123 Mortlake High Street, also known as The Limes or Limes House and previously referred to as Mortlake Terrace, is a Grade II* listed 18th-century property on Mortlake High Street in Mortlake in the London Borough of Richmond upon Thames. The building is now used as commercial office space. It was originally a private house and in the 20th century it functioned as the local town hall. It is featured in two paintings by J. M. W. Turner.

== History of the building ==
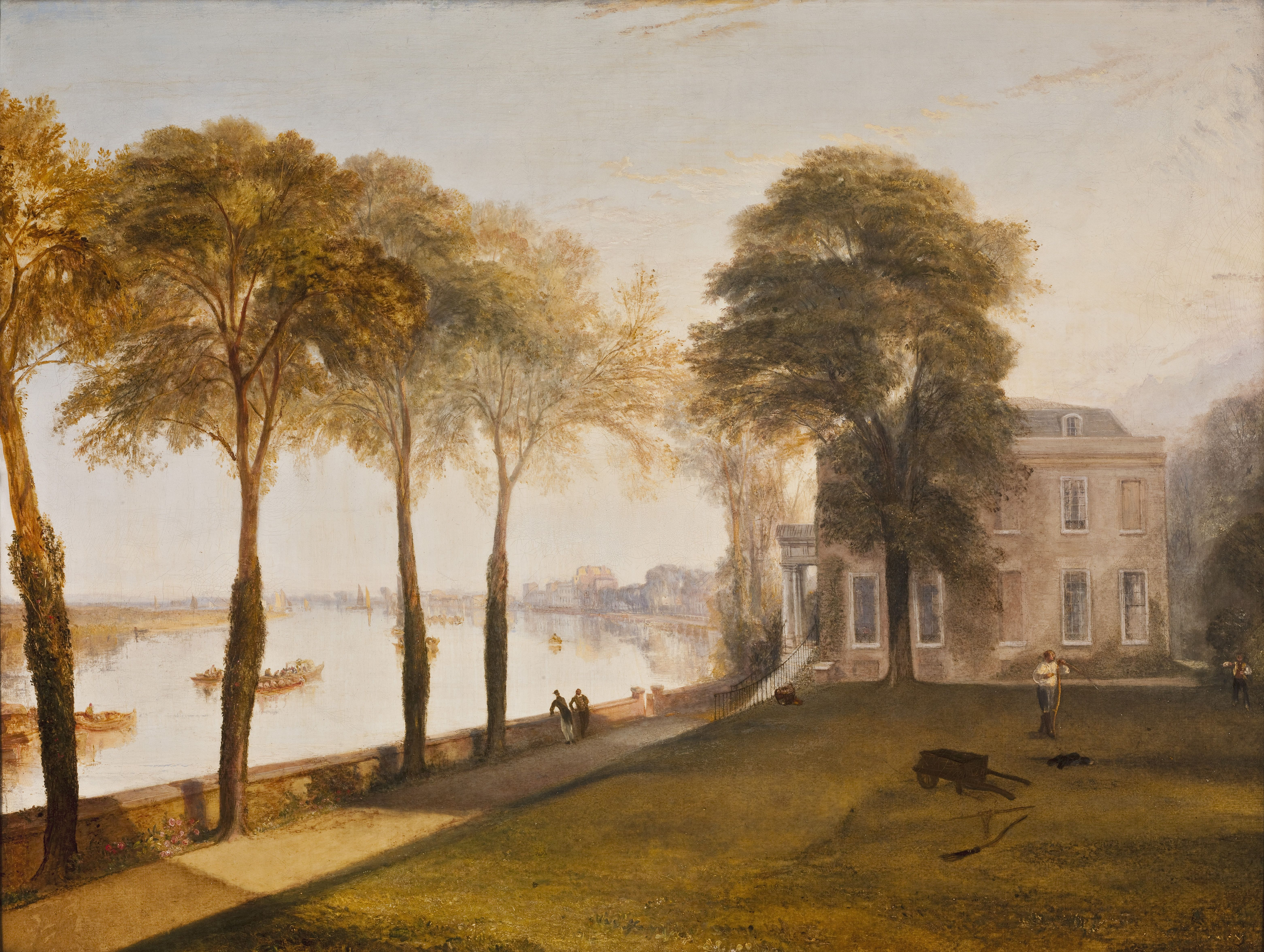
Mortlake Terrace: Early Summer Morning (1827) by J. M. W. Turner. Frick Collection, New York.

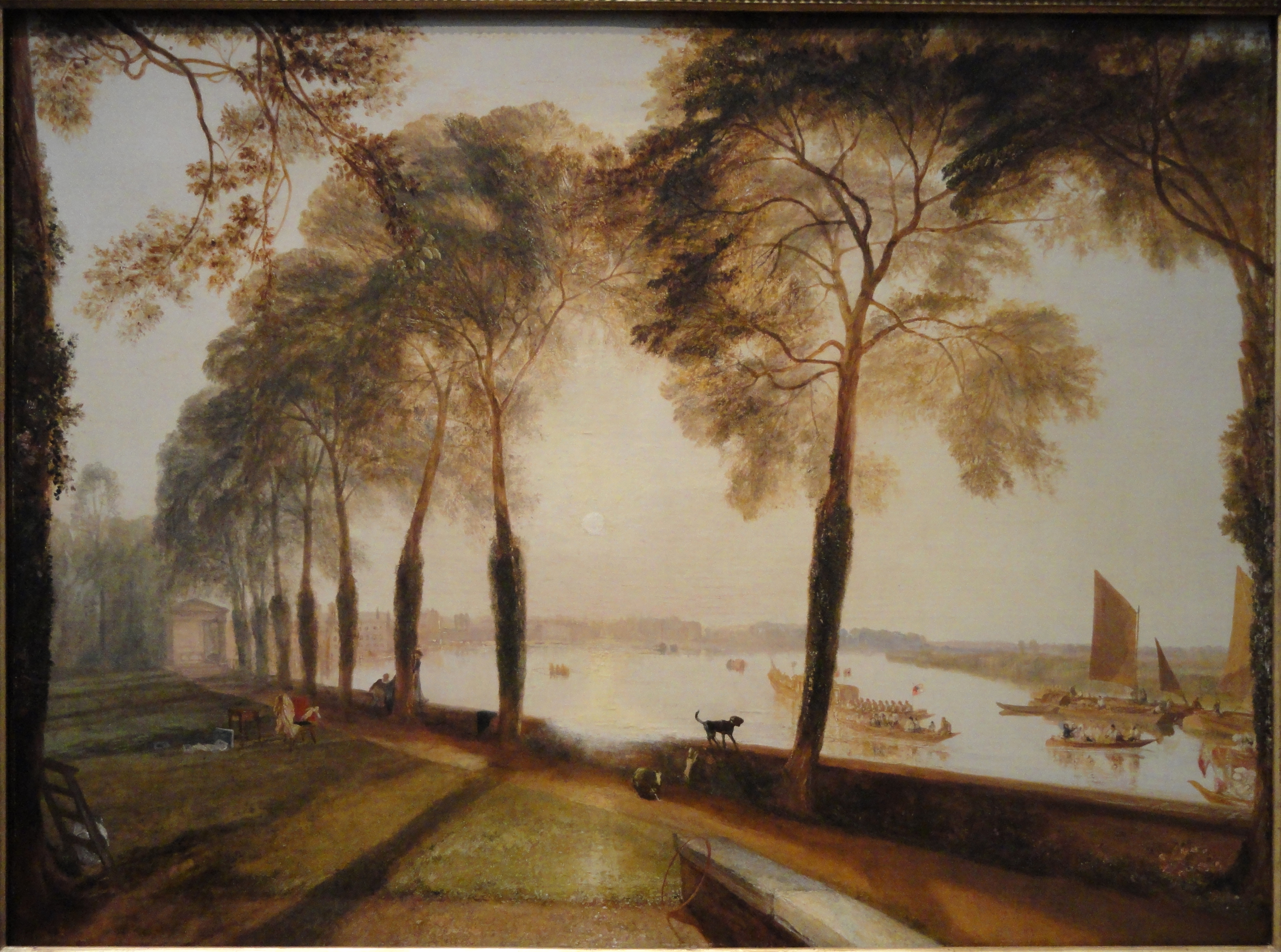
Mortlake Terrace (1827) by J. M. W. Turner, National Gallery of Art, Washington.

The house was built in about 1720 but the facade and porch were added later. The design involved a symmetrical main frontage with nine bays: the central section features a porch with four Tuscan columns.

The building was the seat of local government for the Barnes Urban District from 1895 to 1932 and then of the Municipal Borough of Barnes from 1932 until 1940, when it was damaged by wartime bombing.

The house's 7 acres (2.8 ha) of grounds have now been completely built over, and the building itself has been converted to commercial office space. The exterior is still similar to what it was in two oil paintings that J. M. W. Turner (1755–1851) made while visiting the house in 1827.

== Artistic depictions ==
Turner's two paintings were made for William Moffatt, whose house it then was. Mortlake Terrace: Early Summer Morning (1826) is in the Frick Collection, New York. It was shown in the Royal Academy exhibition of 1826 where it was praised for its "lightness and simplicity". Mortlake Terrace (1827) is in the National Gallery of Art, Washington D.C.

The Museum of London holds a wood engraving of people at The Limes, as it was then called, watching the Oxford and Cambridge Boat Race. The Limes – Mortlake: 1872 is taken from London: A Pilgrimage by Blanchard Jerrold and Gustave Doré, 1872. Jerrold describes how "the towing paths presented to the view of the more fortunate people upon the private river-side terraces, a mixed population ..." The house was, at the time, the residence of a Mr Marsh Nelson.

== Former residents ==
The house's former residents include the Franks, a family of Jewish merchant bankers; Lady Byron, widow of the poet; the educational philanthropist Quintin Hogg; and Garnet Wolseley, 1st Viscount Wolseley, who lived there from 1874 to 1875 and later became Commander-in-Chief of the Forces.
