= Murray Hedgcock =

Australian journalist (1931–2021)

Murray Bertram Hedgcock (23 February 1931 – 6 May 2021) was an Australian cricket writer and journalist. He was born in south Melbourne and grew up in various country towns in Victoria. The test cricketer Bill Woodfull was the headmaster of one of the schools Hedgcock attended. After leaving school, he worked briefly in a bank before becoming a journalist. He worked in newspapers including the Sunraysia Daily (Sunraysia, Victoria) and The News (Adelaide). From 1966 until his retirement in 1991, he was posted to London. He wrote regularly for The Australian, Wisden and The Cricketer.

He edited a collection of PG Wodehouse's cricket writing under the title Wodehouse at the Wicket (1997). His other works included Sport in Twickenham: 91, Borough of Twickenham Local History Society (2012) and two Barnes and Mortlake History Society publications: Hand in hand – Watney's Mortlake world: a brief history of Watney's Brewery gleaned from the company magazine (2007) and Mortlake’s College of 'All Soles' (2020).

Patrick Kidd wrote in The Times that: "Lord’s will be a slightly less lovely place this summer after the sudden death on Thursday of the journalist and cricket-lover Murray Hedgcock."

== Personal life ==
Hedgcock, who held both Australian and British nationalities, lived in Mortlake, south-west London and edited the Barnes and Mortlake History Society's newsletter for almost 20 years. He was married to Margrit Rohner and they had four children together.
