= St Mary the Virgin, Mortlake =

Church in London

Coordinates: 51.4695°N 0.2616°W

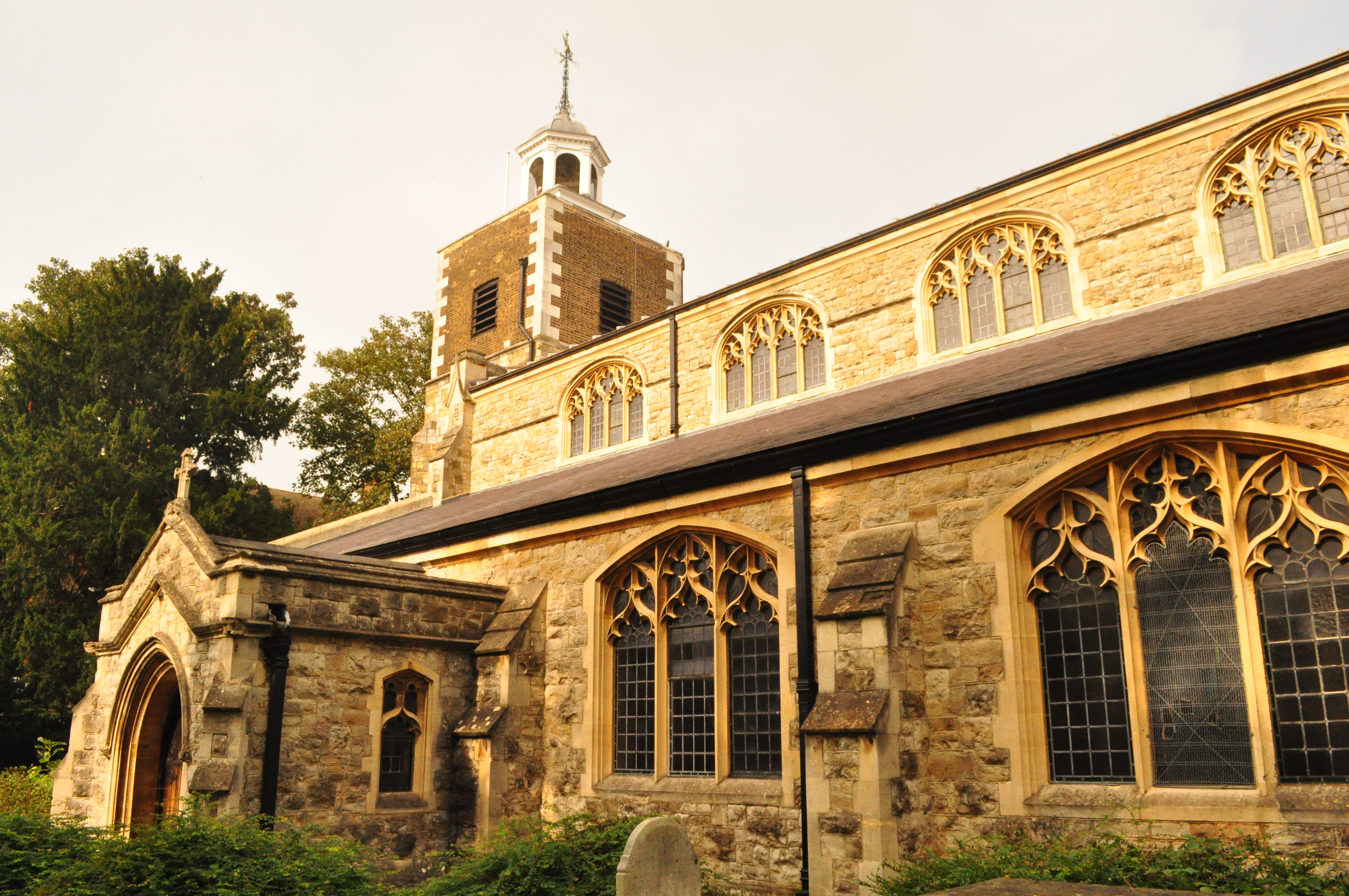
- St Mary the Virgin, Mortlake
- OS grid reference: TQ 20845 75941
- Location: Mortlake High Street; London SW14 8JA
- Country: England
- Denomination: Church of England
- Churchmanship: Central/Liberal
- Website: stmarymortlake.org.uk

History
- Founded: 1348

Architecture
- Style: Tudor, with more recent additions
- Years built: from 1543

Administration
- Diocese: Southwark
- Archdeaconry: Archdeaconry of Wandsworth
- Deanery: Richmond and Barnes
- Parish: Mortlake with East Sheen

Clergy
- Rector: The Revd Jonathan Haynes

Listed Building – Grade II*
- Official name: Parish Church of St Mary
- Designated: 25 October 1951
- Reference no.: 1357705

St Mary the Virgin, Mortlake, is a parish church in Mortlake, in the London Borough of Richmond upon Thames. It is part of the Church of England and the Anglican Communion. The rector is The Revd Jonathan Haynes. It was announced 29 January 2025 that the Revd Ayoob Adwar would be licensed as Team Vicar in March 2025.

The building, on Mortlake High Street, London SW14, dates from 1543 and is Grade II* listed.

== History ==
The first chapel in Mortlake, founded in 1348, stood on the river side of the High Street, on a site later occupied by Mortlake Brewery. The only surviving relic is a 15th-century font presented to this church by Archbishop Bourchier (c.1404–86).

The present churchyard and church were given to the parish by King Henry VIII in 1543, an event commemorated by a stone in the west front of the tower. Its inscription "VIVAT RH8 1543" is dismissed by Cherry and Pevsner as "bogus".

The 1543 building has undergone many alterations and enlargements during its long history and, of the original Tudor church, only the tower remains. The belfry and the cupola are a distinctive feature of the tower which appears as a landmark in many historic prints and pictures of the Thames bank. The current appearance of the church is mostly the work of local architect Sir Arthur Blomfield, who built the chancel in 1885; his firm built the nave in 1905.

The vestry house dates from 1670. It was restored in 1979/80.

=== Internal fittings ===
The church's pulpit was installed in 1902 in memory of Albert Shadwell Shutt, who had been the church's vicar from 1866 to 1896.

=== Memorials ===
The earliest surviving tomb in the churchyard is that of the astrologer John Partridge, who died in 1715. There are memorials to other famous people including a British Prime Minister, Henry Addington, 1st Viscount Sidmouth (1757–1844) and three Lord Mayors of London. A memorial to John Dee (1527–1609), who lived opposite the church and is buried in an unmarked spot beneath the chancel, was unveiled in June 2013.

== Present day ==
Together with Christ Church, East Sheen and All Saints' Church, East Sheen, St Mary's forms the parish of Mortlake with East Sheen. The parish publishes a monthly magazine, Parish Link. The church stands in the Central and Liberal traditions of the Church of England. Services are held on Tuesday, Saturday and Sunday mornings.

Mortlake Quiet Gardens are based around the landscaped churchyard and are affiliated to The Quiet Garden Trust.

== Gallery ==
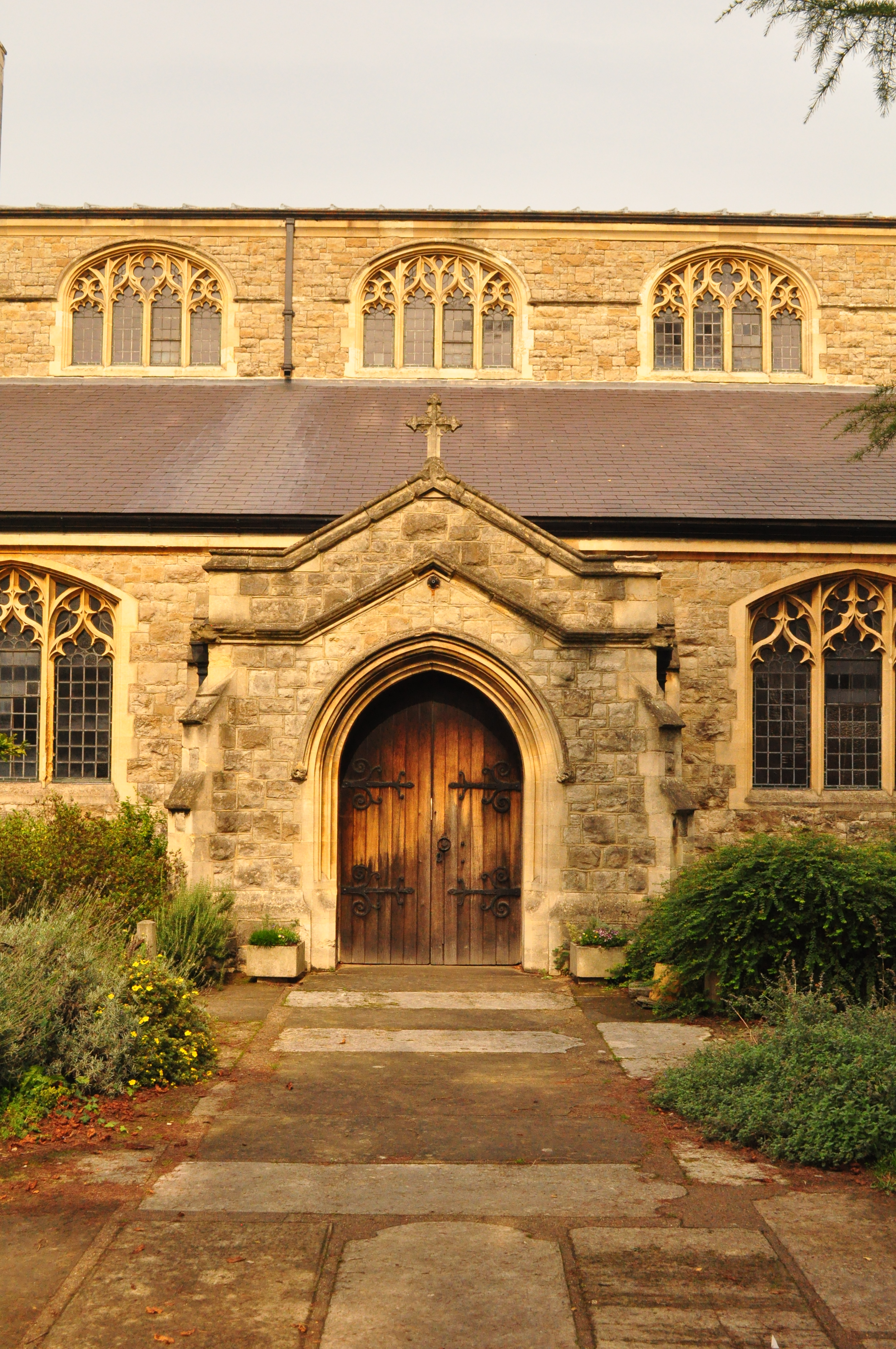
South door

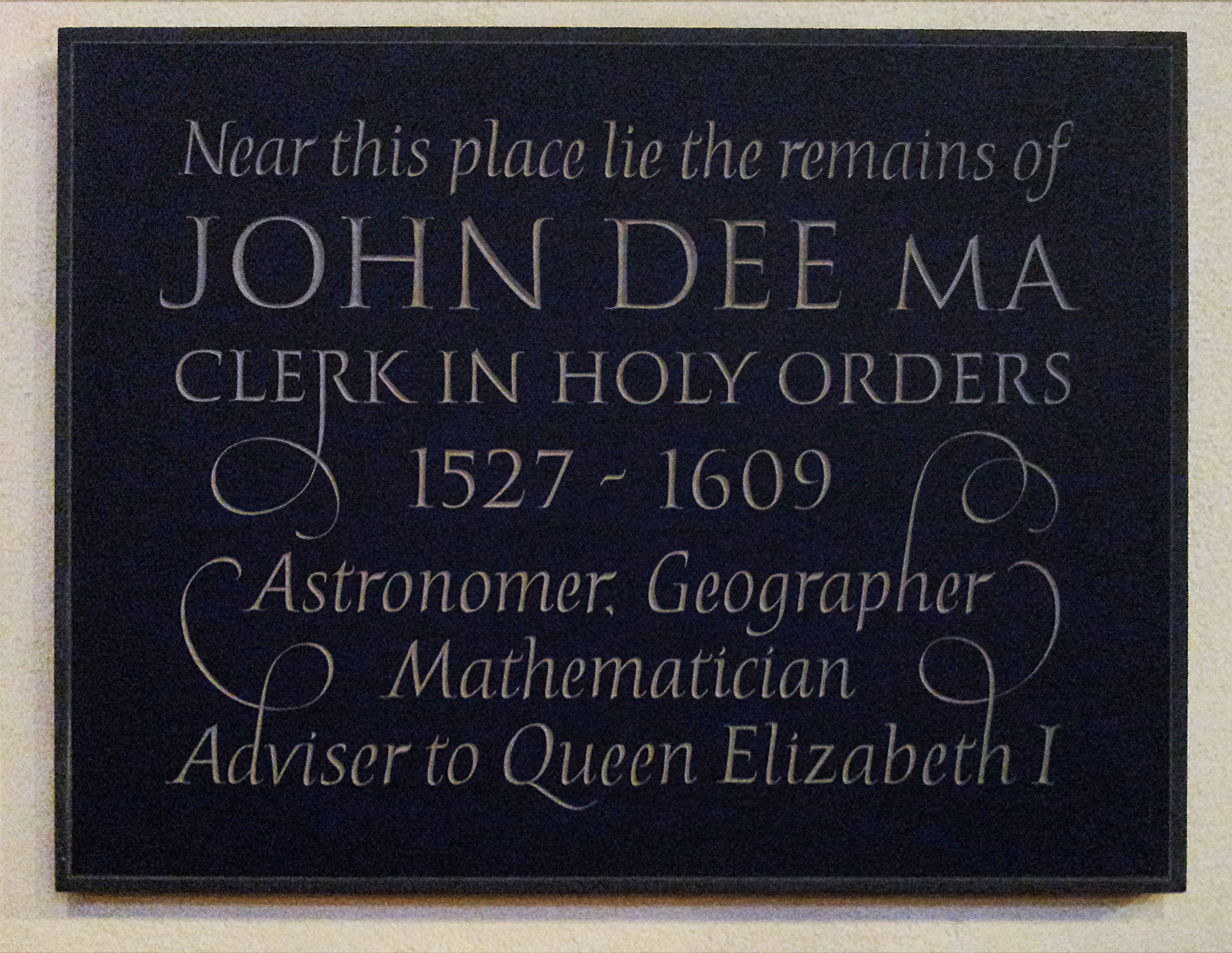
John Dee memorial plaque installed in 2013 inside the church

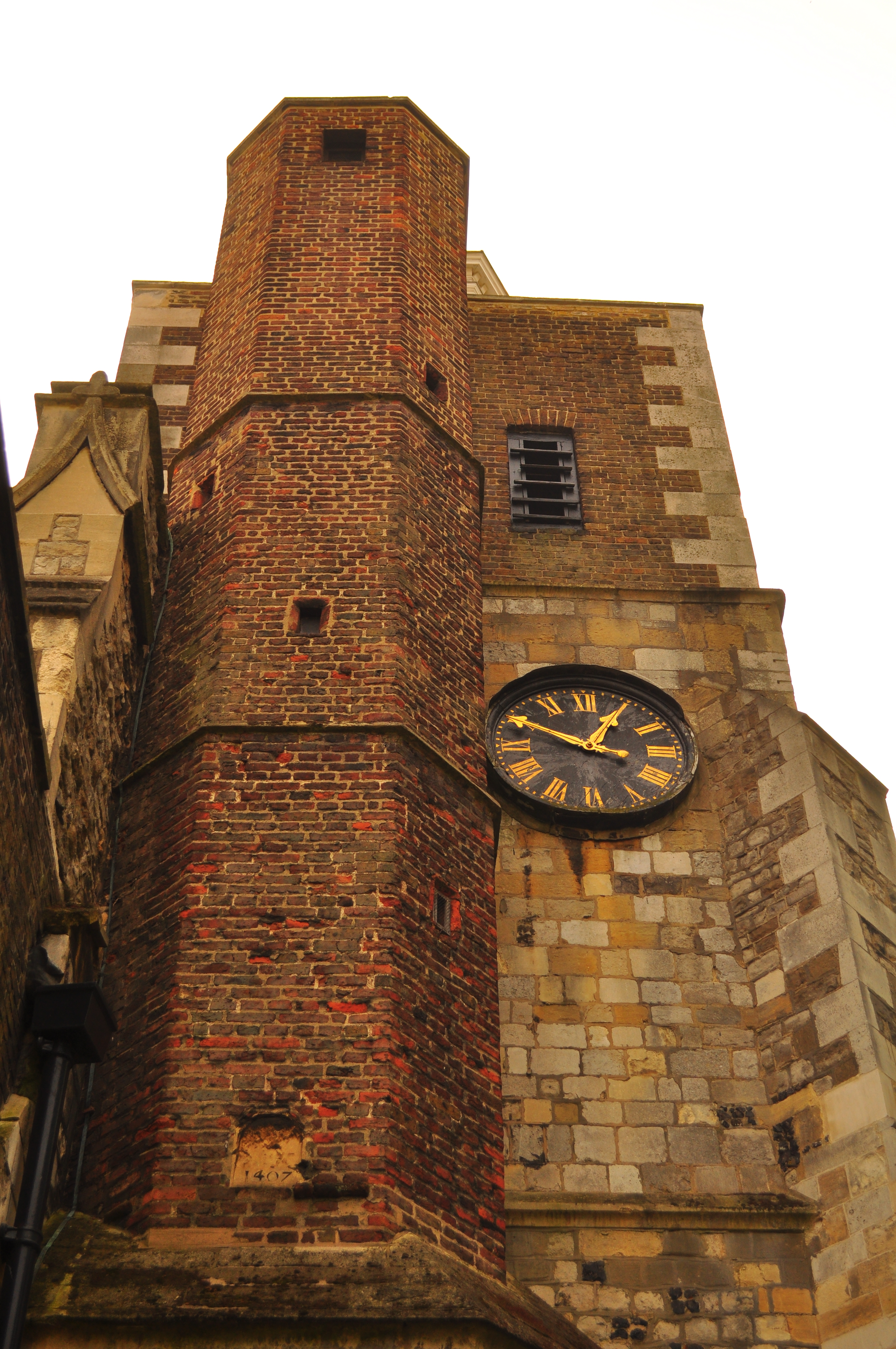
The north face of the tower

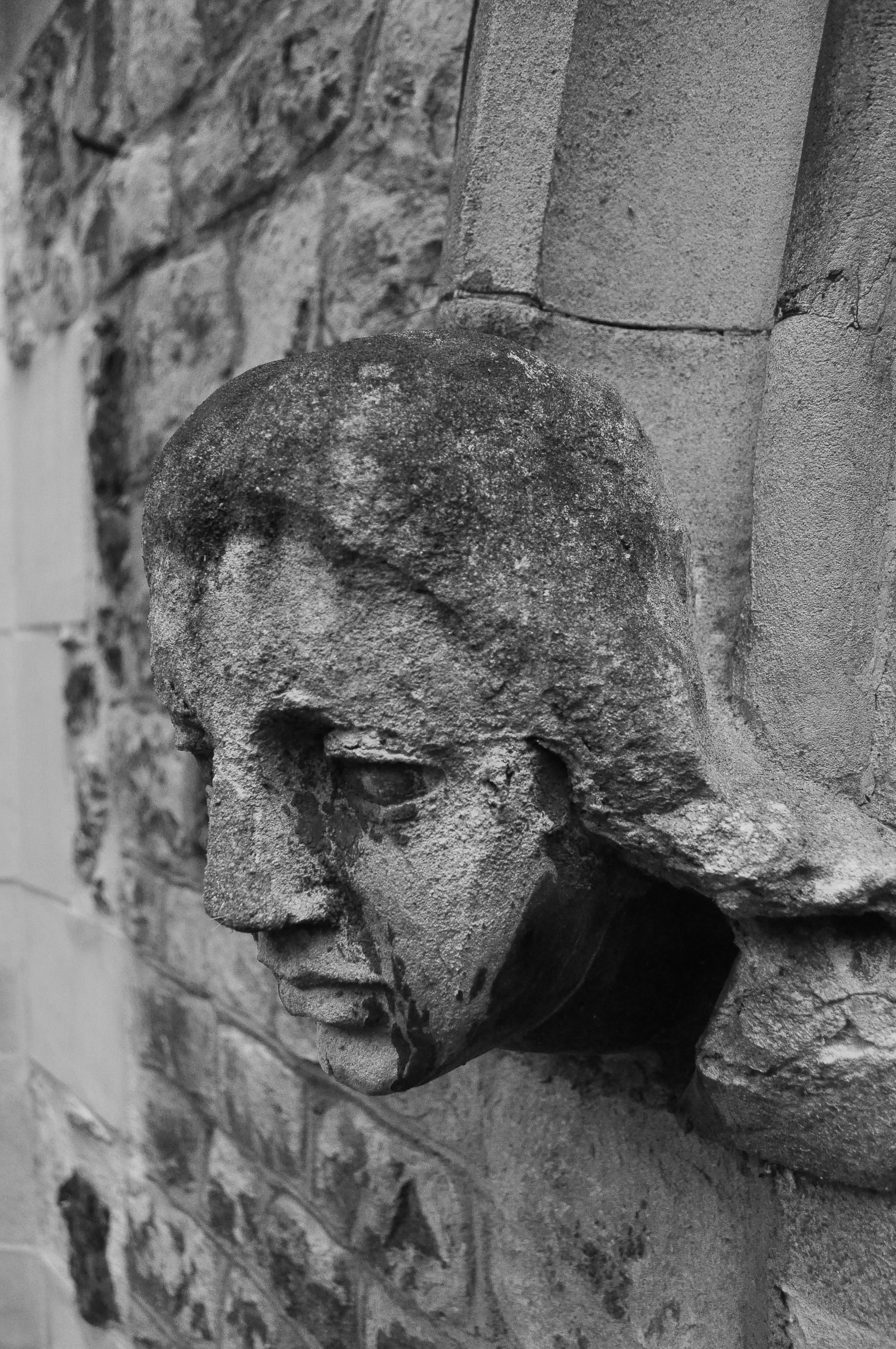
Sculpture by the front door

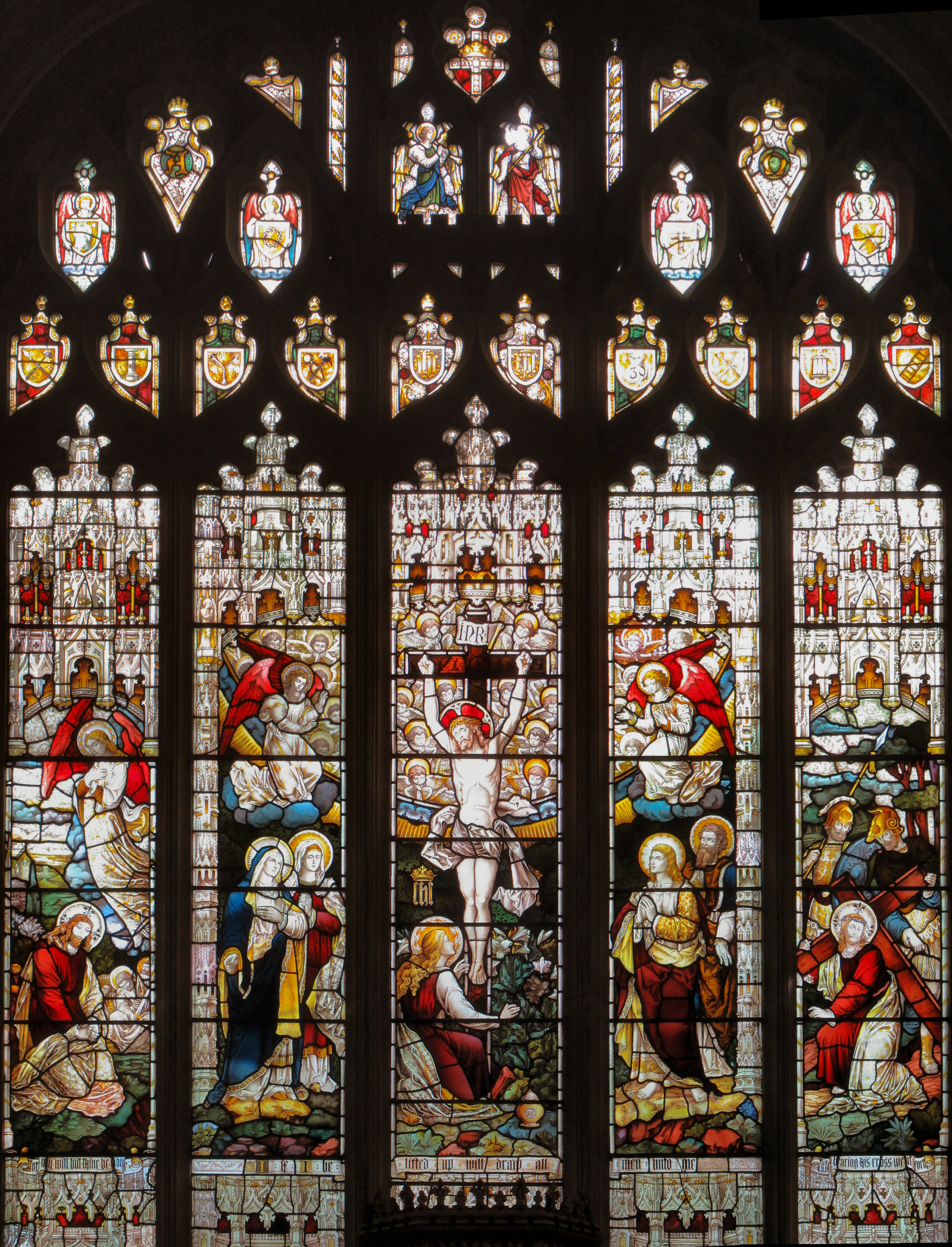
East window

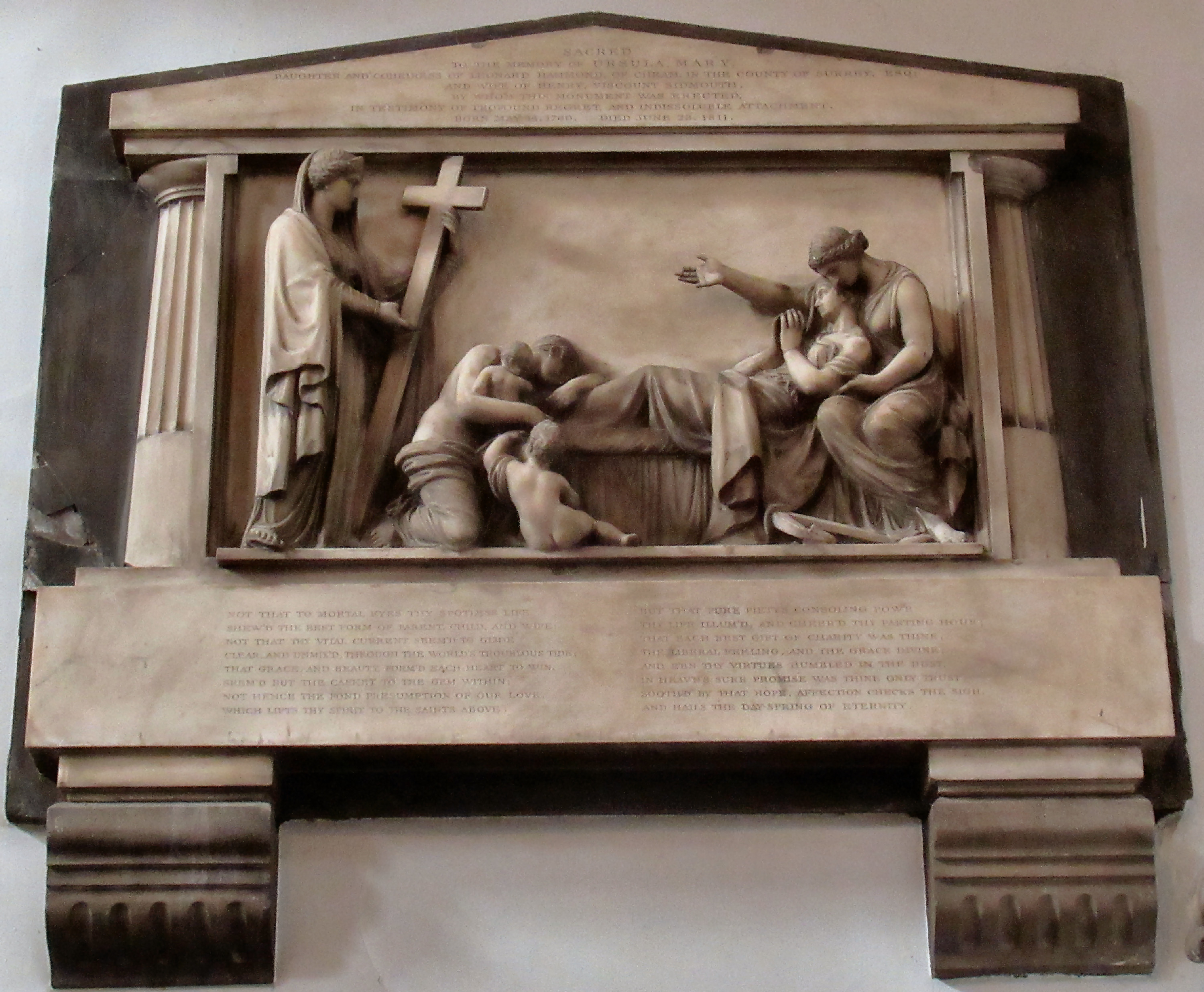
Memorial

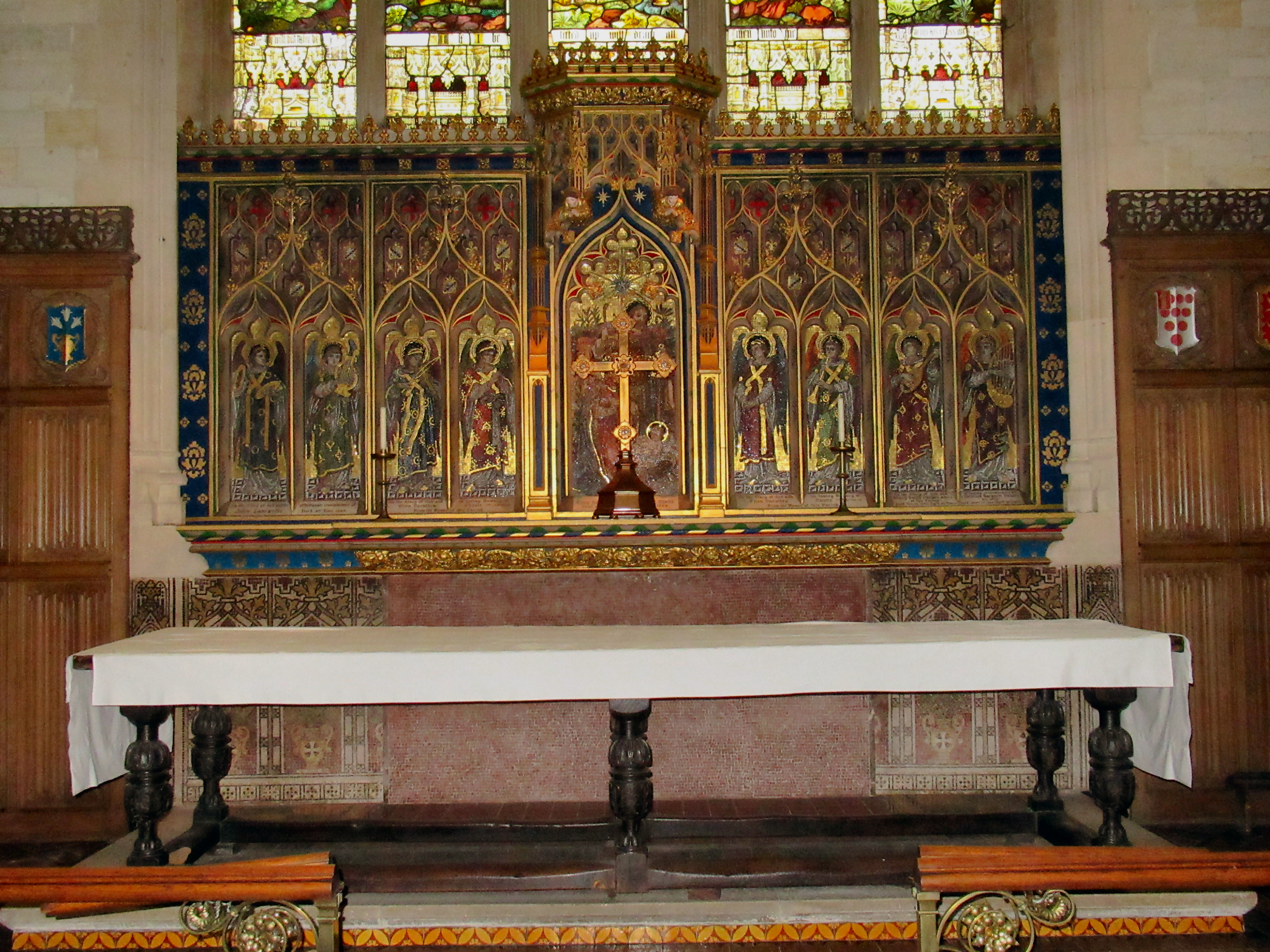
Altar
