= Anthony Jacobs, Baron Jacobs =

British businessman and politician

The Right Honourable The Lord Jacobs
- Jacobs in 2008

Member of the House of Lords
- Lord Temporal
- Life peerage 18 October 1997 – 21 June 2014

Personal details
- Born: 13 November 1931
- Died: 21 June 2014 (aged 82)

Coat of arms of Anthony Jacobs, Baron Jacobs
Crest An artist’s palette the thumb hole transfixed by a pomegranate slipped and leaved all Proper. Escutcheon Or in chief a seven-branched candlestick and in base a wheel both Sable on a chief Ermine a lion passant Gules. Supporters On either side a giant anteater statant erect Argent armed and gorged with a plain collar attached thereto a chain reflexed over the back Or. Motto Tutius Moto

David Anthony Jacobs, Baron Jacobs, known as Anthony Jacobs (13 November 1931 – 21 June 2014) was a British businessman and an Independent politician. He left the Liberal Democrats in 2011.

The son of Ridley and Ella Jacobs, he was educated at Clifton College, Bristol and the University of London.

Jacobs was chairman of document reproduction equipment firm Nig Securities Group from 1957 to 1972, of fashion firm Tricoville Group from 1961 to 1990 and 1992 to 1994, and of British School of Motoring from 1973 to 1990. From 1972, he was member of the Liberal Party, contesting Watford in both general elections in 1974. In 1984, Jacobs became his Party's Joint Treasurer, a post he stepped down from three years later.

Jacobs was knighted in 1988 and on 18 October 1997, he was created a life peer as Baron Jacobs, of Belgravia in the City of Westminster. He took the Liberal Democrat whip until January 2011 when he resigned from the party, citing opposition to its policies on taxation. He sat in the Lords as a non-affiliated member until his death. From 1999 to 2002 he was a member of the House of Lords Works of Art Committee.

At the time of his peerage he also received an Honorary Doctorate from the University of Haifa in recognition of his generous support for the excavation of an ancient shipwreck at Ma'agan Michael. He ranked 614th in the Sunday Times Rich List of 2008 being estimated to be worth £128 million due to driving schools and fast food.

Party political offices
Preceded by Rhys Lloyd; Monroe Palmer	Treasurer of the Liberal Party; 1983 – 1986; With: Wynn Normington Hugh-Jones	Succeeded by Chris Fox; Tim Razzall
