= Municipal Borough of Barnes =

Former local government area in the UK

Coordinates: 51.468°N 0.260°W

Barnes
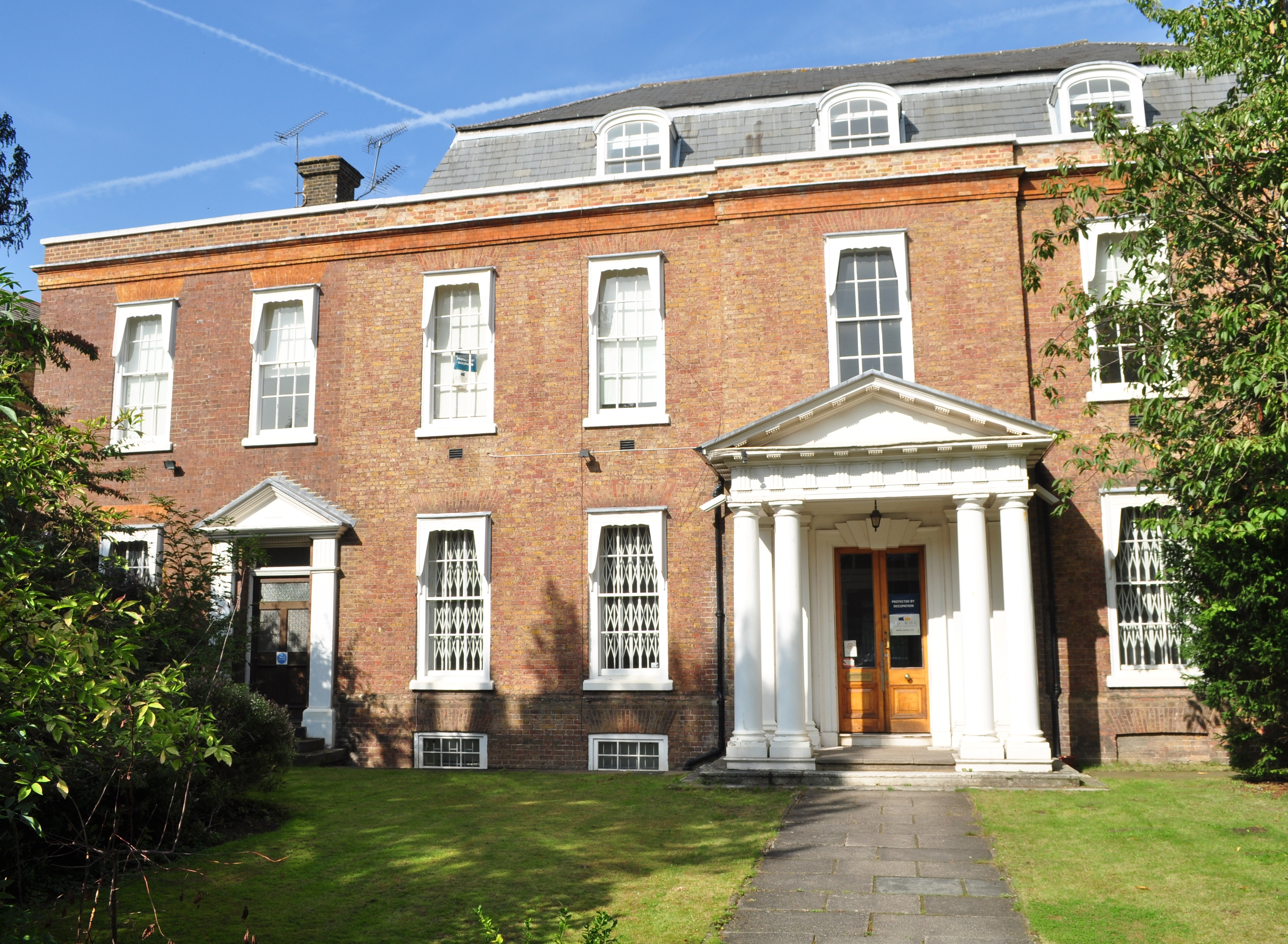
- 123 Mortlake High Street, built in 1720 and, from 1895 until 1940, the seat of local government for the Municipal Borough of Barnes
- Area
  - 1911: 2,518 acres (10.2 km^{2})
  - 1961: 2,521 acres (10.2 km^{2})
- Population
  - 1911: 30,377
  - 1961: 39,057
- Density
  - 1911: 12.06/acre
  - 1961: 15.49/acre
- History
  - Created: 1894
  - Abolished: 1965
  - Succeeded by: Richmond upon Thames
- Status: Urban district (until 1932); Municipal borough (after 1932)
- Government
  - HQ: 123 Mortlake High Street (1895–1940), Penrhyn Rooms, 262 Upper Richmond Road West (1940-1965)
  - Motto: Not For Ourselves Alone

Barnes was a local government district in north west Surrey from 1894 to 1965, when its former area was absorbed into the London Borough of Richmond upon Thames.

== History ==
The parish of Barnes adopted the Local Government Act 1858 in 1893. It became an urban district in 1894.

On 1 April 1901 the Putney detached exclave was gained from the Metropolitan Borough of Wandsworth. Barnes became a municipal borough in 1932.

It contained the settlements of Barnes, Mortlake and East Sheen. It was part of the London postal district and Metropolitan Police District. The district was bounded by the County of London to the east, the River Thames and Middlesex to the north, and the Municipal Borough of Richmond to the west and south. The council met at 123 Mortlake High Street from 1895 until 1940, when the building was damaged by wartime bombing. After the war the council met at the Penryn Rooms in East Sheen.

In 1965 it was abolished and its former area became part of the London Borough of Richmond upon Thames. The abolition was marked by a civic "wake" at the Home Guard Association Club.

== Municipal services ==
During the post-war period, the municipal borough maintained an extensive network of civic infrastructure and public utilities. According to the 1947 edition of The Municipal Year Book, the corporation owned and operated public libraries, artisans' dwellings, an electricity undertaking, a local cemetery, pleasure grounds, allotments, public baths and public wash-houses. Recreational facilities managed directly by the council included tennis courts and bowling greens.

The council operated a municipal "dust destructor" for refuse management and maintained an infectious diseases hospital alongside a joint sewage system managed in partnership with neighbouring Richmond. The borough's crematorium was managed as a joint venture with Hammersmith, and utility infrastructure was split between public and private providers, with water supplied by the Metropolitan Water Board and gas managed by a private company.

== Coat of arms ==
The district's coat of arms, granted in 1932, was: Azure a saltire or between four ostrich feathers argent two oars in saltire proper that to the dexter bladed dark blue and that to the sinister bladed light blue. The supporters were: Two griffins gules langued and armed azure, the dexter gorged with a collar flory or, charged with four crosses patée fitchy sable, the sinister gorged with a like collar charged with four lozenges, also sable. There was no crest.

The oars belonged to the boat race teams of the University of Oxford (dark blue) and the University of Cambridge (light blue), whose course on the River Thames ran along the borough's northern border, finishing at Mortlake. The feathers were derived from the Prince of Wales at the time of the grant (later Edward VIII and Duke of Windsor) whose birthplace, White Lodge, lay in the former borough. The griffins were derived from the arms of the Earls Spencer, who were once lords of the manor of Mortlake. The crosses came from the arms of the Archbishop of Canterbury, who also once held the same manor, and the lozenges from the arms of the Bishop of Southwark, in whose diocese the borough was situated.

The oars became part of the coat of arms of the London Borough of Richmond upon Thames, along with the red griffin supporters.

== Council members ==
Council members included:

- Geoffrey Herbert Freyberg CBE RN (Retd.)

== Mayors of Barnes ==
The leadership legacy of the area remains preserved at York House in Twickenham, where the "Past Mayors of Barnes Roll of Honour" board is on display inside the Council Chamber.

- 1946–47: Francis George Sutton-Mattocks
- 1964–65: Alfred George Henry Lawrance
