= Mausoleum of Sir Richard and Lady Burton =

Tent-shaped mausoleum in London

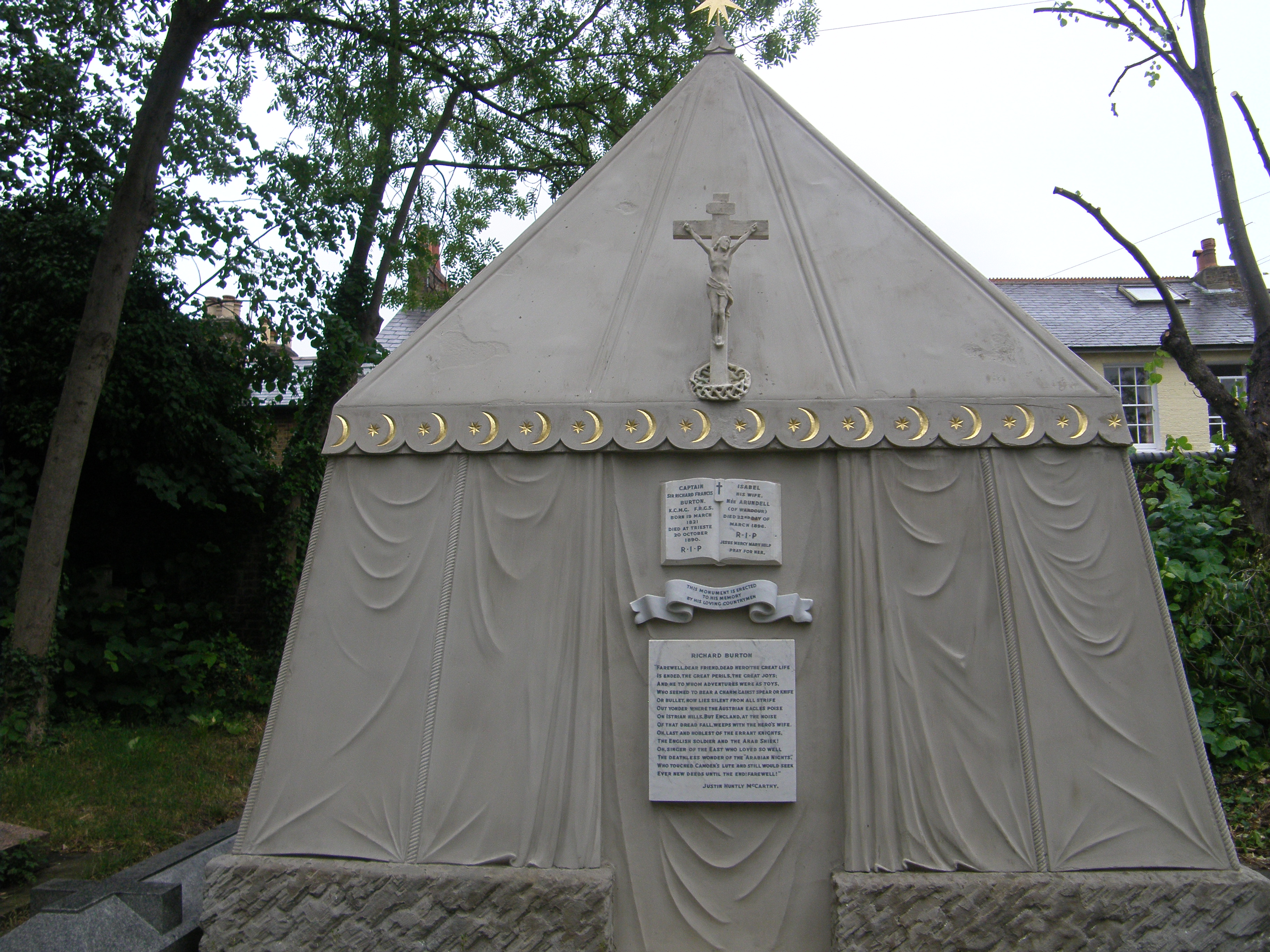
- Interactive map of the Mausoleum of Sir Richard and Lady Burton area

General information
- Type: Mausoleum
- Location: 61 North Worple Way, Mortlake, London SW14 8PR, Mortlake, London Borough of Richmond upon Thames, England
- Coordinates: 51°28′06″N 0°15′41″W

Listed Building – Grade II*
- Official name: Mausoleum of Sir Richard and Lady Burton, Churchyard of St Mary Magdalen
- Designated: 30 October 1973
- Reference no.: 1065392

The Mausoleum of Sir Richard and Lady Burton is a Grade II* listed tent-shaped mausoleum of Carrara marble and Forest of Dean stone in the churchyard of St Mary Magdalen Roman Catholic Church Mortlake in the London Borough of Richmond upon Thames. It contains the tombs of the Victorian explorer Sir Richard Burton (1821–90), who took part in the search for the source of the River Nile and translated The Arabian Nights, and his wife Isabel, Lady Burton (1831–96), who designed it. The coffins of Sir Richard and Lady Burton can be seen through a glass panel at the rear of the tent, which can be accessed via a short fixed ladder. The inscription includes a commemorative sonnet by Justin Huntly McCarthy (1859–1936), who lived in Putney.

The mausoleum was completed in time for Sir Richard's funeral at the church on 15 June 1891. It was restored in 1975 and, with the support of the Friends of Burton and the Environment Trust for Richmond upon Thames, in 2012–13. It is now maintained by Habitats & Heritage.

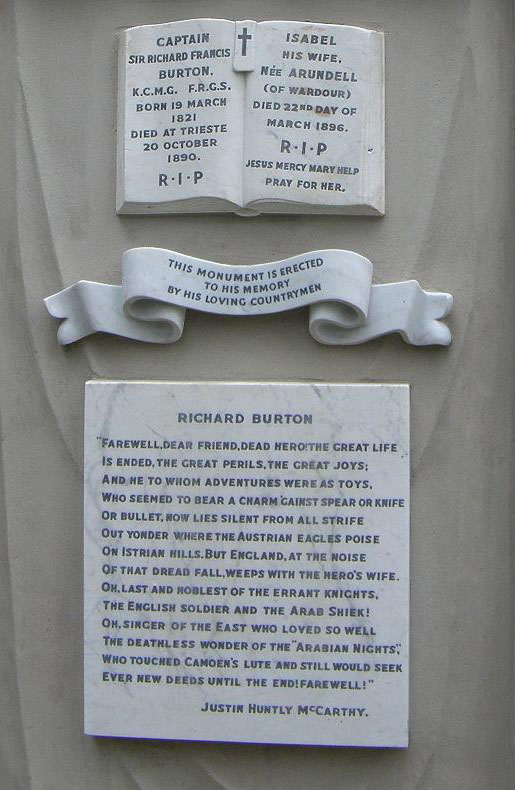
Close-up of inscription on the mausoleum

Next to the lady chapel in the church there is a memorial stained-glass window to Burton, erected by his widow.

== Architecture ==
Burtons' mausoleum is carved from sandstone in the shape of the tent that the couple used for expeditions into the Syrian desert. The building is decorated with symbols of both Islam and Christianity, reflecting the Catholicism of Isabel Burton and Burton's fascination with Middle Eastern philosophy and religion.

The Mausoleum was restored in 2025 and opened to visitors in 2026.
