= Mortlake =

Coordinates: 51.4655°N 0.2643°W

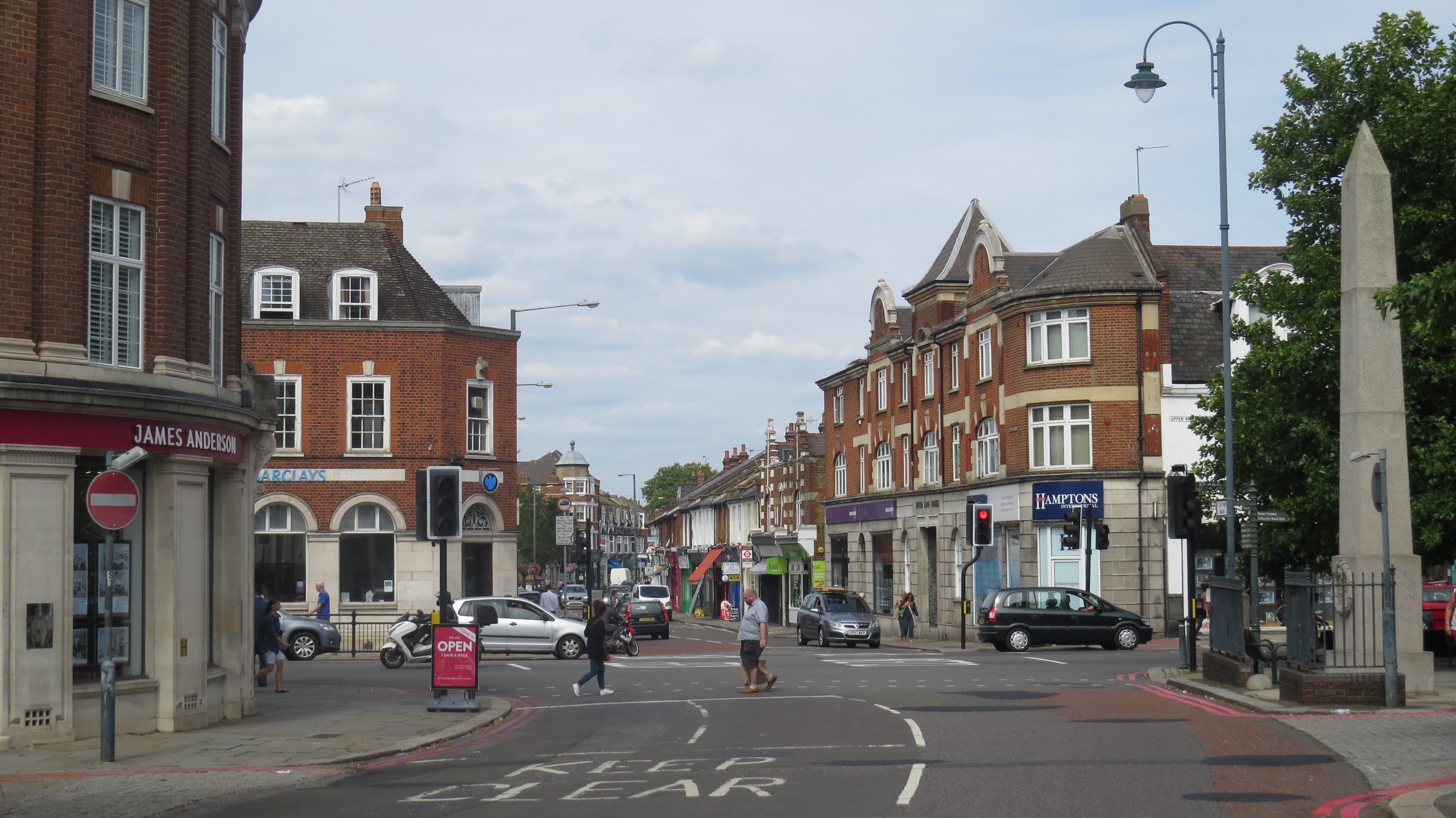
- Mortlake from the Junction of Upper Richmond Road and Sheen Lane

- Location within Greater London
- Area: 4.50 km^{2} (1.74 sq mi)
- Population: 10,919 (Mortlake and Barnes Common ward 2011)
  - Density: 2,426/km^{2} (6,280/sq mi)
- OS grid reference: TQ205755
- London borough: Richmond
- Ceremonial county: Greater London
- Region: London
- Country: England
- Sovereign state: United Kingdom
- Post town: LONDON
- Postcode district: SW14
- Dialling code: 020
- Police: Metropolitan
- Fire: London
- Ambulance: London
- UK Parliament: Richmond Park
- London Assembly: South West

Mortlake is a suburban district of the London Borough of Richmond upon Thames on the south bank of the River Thames between Kew and Barnes. Historically it was part of Surrey and until 1965 was in the Municipal Borough of Barnes. Its Stuart and Georgian history was economically one of malting, brewing, farming, watermen and the Mortlake Tapestry Works (1617–1704) Britain's most important producer. A London landmark, the former Mortlake Brewery or Stag Brewery, is on the edge of Mortlake.

The Waterloo to Reading railway line runs through Mortlake, which has a pedestrianised riverside, two riverside pubs and a village green. The Boat Race between Oxford and Cambridge universities' rowing teams finishes at Mortlake every March/April.

== Governance ==
The area lies within the Mortlake and Barnes Common ward of the London Borough of Richmond upon Thames. In the 2018 local elections two Conservatives and one Liberal Democrats were elected to represent the ward, with two Liberal Democrats and one Green elected in 2022. The ward is part of the Richmond Park parliamentary constituency, and the South West constituency in the London Assembly.

On 1 April 1965 the civil parish was abolished. At the 1951 census (one of the last before the abolition of the parish), Mortlake had a population of 22,634.

== History ==
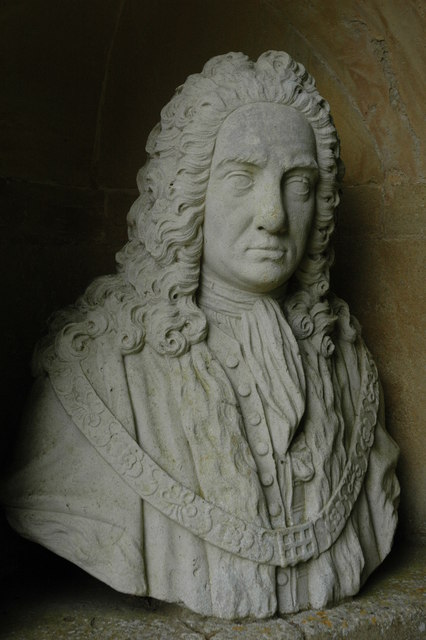
This is a contemporary bust of Sir John Barnard who lived much of his adult life as MP in one of a few Georgian mansions built in Mortlake for London's upper class. It is kept at Stowe House, Buckinghamshire.

The place-name 'Mortlake' is first attested in the Domesday Book of 1086, where it appears as Mortelaga and Mortelage, a name with two possible derivations. If the second element is the Old English lacu meaning a stream, then the first element is very likely the fish-name mort meaning a young salmon, hence 'salmon stream'. If the second element is the dialect lag meaning a long, narrow marshy meadow, then the name means 'Morta's meadow'.

Mortlake historically lay in the hundred of Brixton.

According to the Domesday Book, the manor and parish of Mortlage was held by Archbishop Lanfranc of Canterbury when its assets were: 25 hides; 1 church, 2 mills worth £5, 1 fishery, 33 ploughs, 20 acres (8 hectares) of meadow, wood worth 55 hogs. It rendered a large £38 plus 4s 4d from 17 houses in London, 2s 3d from houses in Southwark and £1 from tolls at Putney per year to its feudal system overlords. The manor belonged to the Archbishops of Canterbury until the time of Henry VIII, when it passed by exchange to the Crown. From the early part of the 17th century until after the English Civil War, Mortlake was celebrated for the manufacture of tapestry, founded during the reign of James I at the Mortlake Tapestry Works.

Mortlake was reduced by 732 acres (296 hectares) when Richmond Park was created by Charles I in 1637. Other parishes also lost smaller amounts of land to the new deer park.

Colston House's forebear was built by Thomas Cromwell, Earl of Essex then acquired by Edward Colston, major benefactor and investor to the port city of Bristol. This was pulled down in 1860. John Barber, Lord Mayor in 1733, a suspected Jacobite opposed to the 'Georgian' House of Hanover but Member of Parliament for the City on the strength of his opposition to Walpole's protectionist excise scheme, was buried in Mortlake in 1741. He had given land to extend the churchyard. Sir Henry Taylor, KCMG, the dramatic poet, lived in Mortlake in the 19th century.

Sir John Barnard, Lord Mayor of London in the year 1737 and also an MP, used public addresses and private campaigns to outstanding effect in supporting the government against the Jacobite movement in 1745.

Since 1845, the Oxford and Cambridge Boat Race has had its finish point at Mortlake, marked by the University Boat Race stone just downstream of Chiswick Bridge. Several other important rowing races over the Championship Course also either start or finish at the stone. The first National School in Mortlake was built providing compulsory education at primary level in 1869, followed by an infants school in 1890 and county level, into secondary level school in 1906. James Chuter Ede taught there in the years leading up to his election to Surrey County Council in 1914, when he became the leading figure in the development of education in Surrey; he eventually became Home Secretary throughout the Attlee administration.

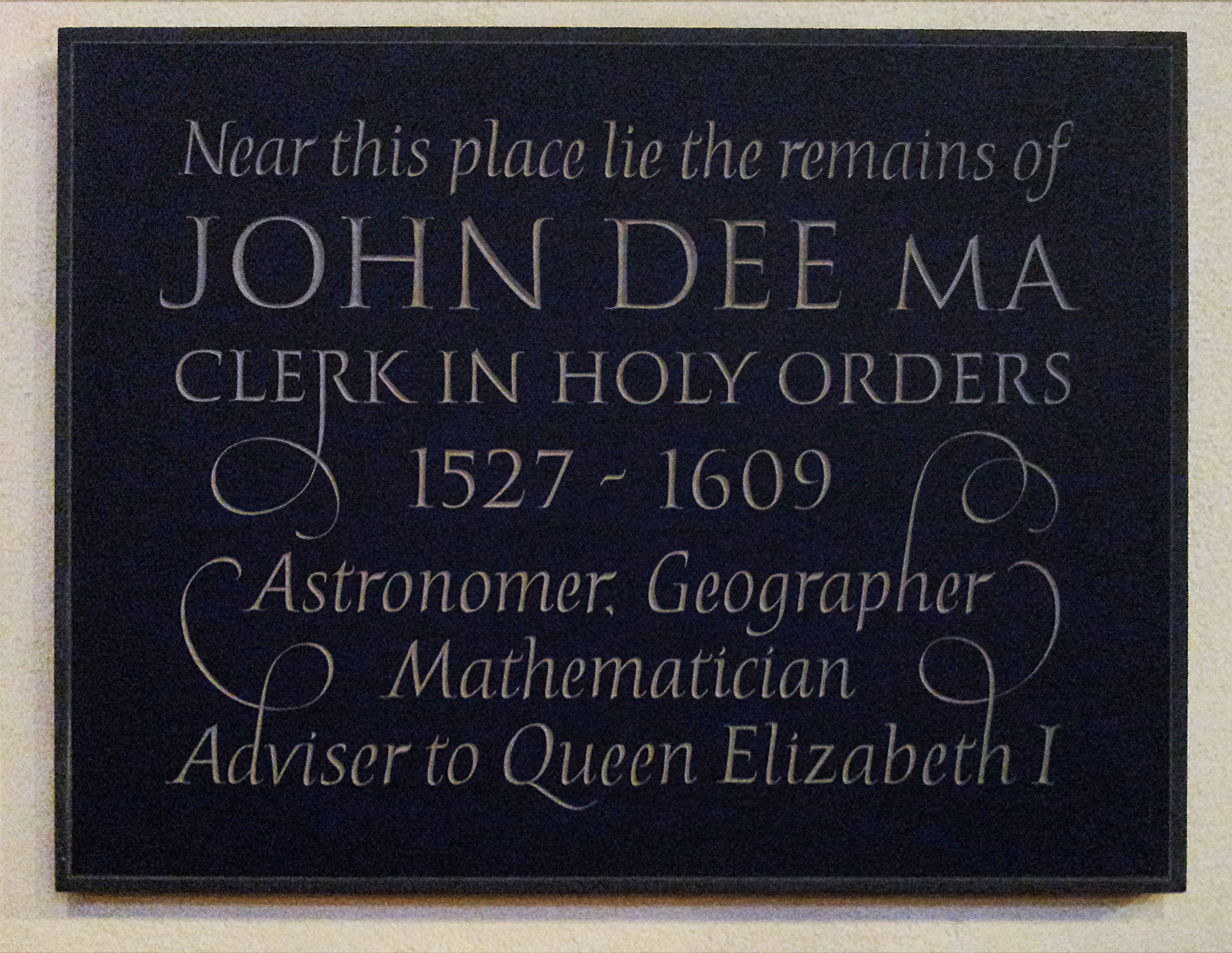
John Dee memorial plaque in the church of St Mary the Virgin Mortlake

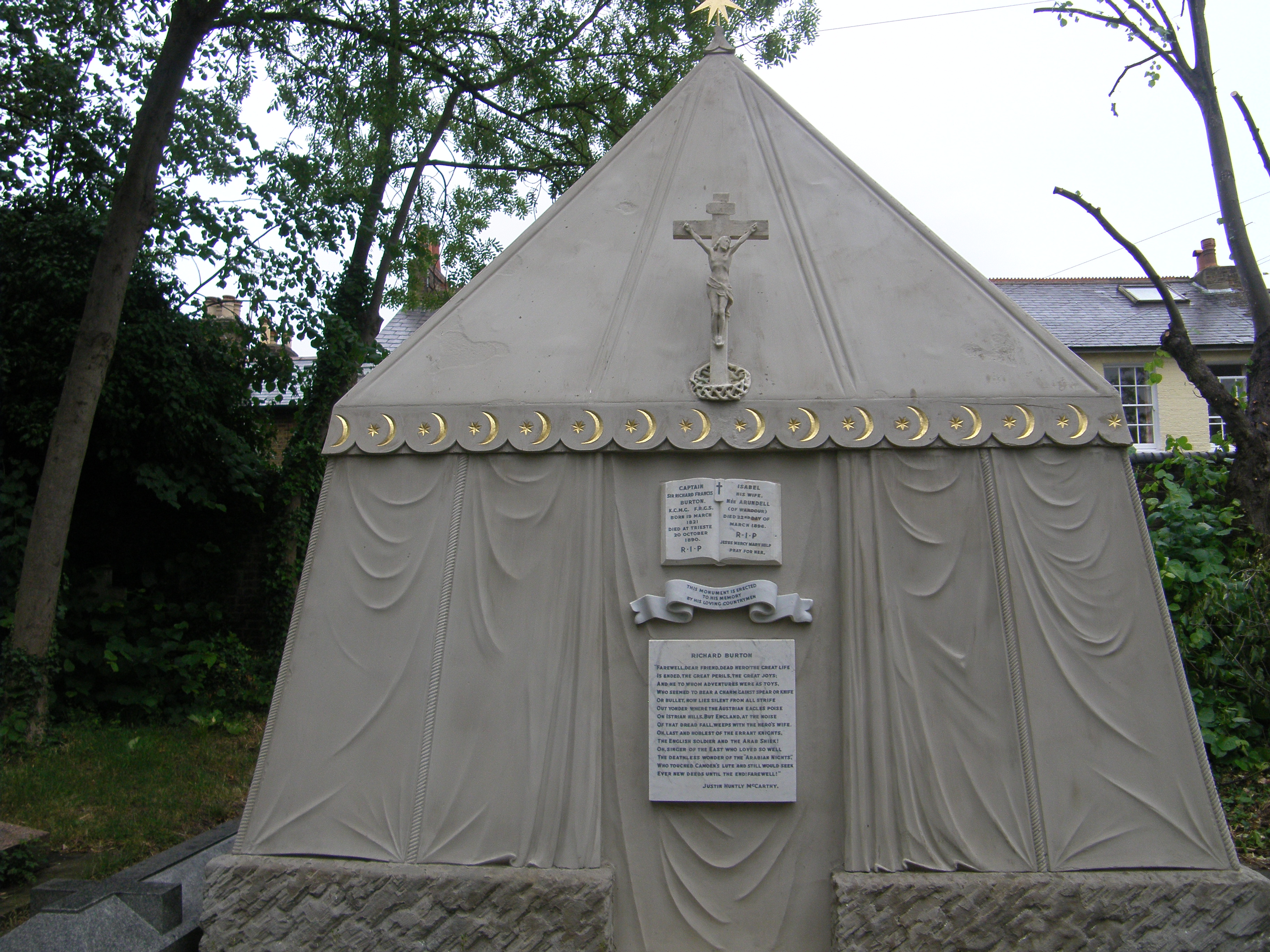
Sir Richard Burton's tomb at St Mary Magdalen's Roman Catholic Church cemetery

== People ==
=== Living people ===
- Katherine Jenkins, classical singer, lives in Mortlake.
- Tom Hardy, actor, producer, writer and former model, grew up in Mortlake.

=== Historical figures ===
- Apart from Archbishops of Canterbury, Mortlake's most famous former resident is John Dee (1527–1608/09), mathematician, astronomer, astrologer, alchemist and adviser to Queen Elizabeth I. He lived at Mortlake from 1565 to 1595 except for the six years between 1583 and 1589 when he was travelling in Europe. His house no longer exists but it became the Mortlake Tapestry Works and at the end of the 18th century was a girls' school.
- Sir Christopher Packe (1593?–1682), Lord Mayor of London, lived in Mortlake in about 1655–60.
- John Partridge (astrologer) (1644–c.1714) was born at East Sheen and apprenticed to a local shoemaker. He died in Mortlake and is buried there.
- Edward Colston, the English merchant, philanthropist and Tory Member of Parliament who was involved in the Atlantic slave trade, lived at (old) Cromwell House (demolished 1857) from about 1689 until his death in 1721.
- The cemetery of St Mary Magdalen Roman Catholic Church Mortlake contains the tomb of the Victorian explorer and orientalist Sir Richard Burton (1821–1890).
- Former British Prime Minister Henry Addington (1757–1844) who, as Lord Sidmouth, was Ranger of Richmond Park, and after whom the park's Sidmouth Plantation is named, is buried at St Mary the Virgin Mortlake.
- Ada Lovelace (1815–1852), English mathematician and writer, lived in Mortlake when she was 15 years old.
- Murray Hedgcock (1931–2021), Australian cricket writer and journalist, lived in Mortlake.

== Economy ==
Mortlake is mostly a residential commuter town with a strong history of self-employed trades as it has traditionally centred its commerce on its foreshortened boundary, the Upper Richmond Road, arguably half part of East Sheen. Some businesses on the north side of the Upper Richmond Road make reference to the old ecclesiastical and ward boundaries supported by their still Mortlake side streets. East Sheen was once a manor in the parish of Mortlake and since early times an economic forum, and now a dining and convenience hub of the two districts. The Victoria County History's volume on Surrey, written from 1910 to 1912, does not list East Sheen as a parish, describes its detailed history under Mortlake and states the parish was "now connected with Barnes on one side and with New Richmond on the other". With the advent of motor transport, the buildings on Mortlake's winding high street, also known as the Lower Mortlake Road, have been mostly residential or used by the brewery.

== Stag Brewery or Mortlake Brewery ==
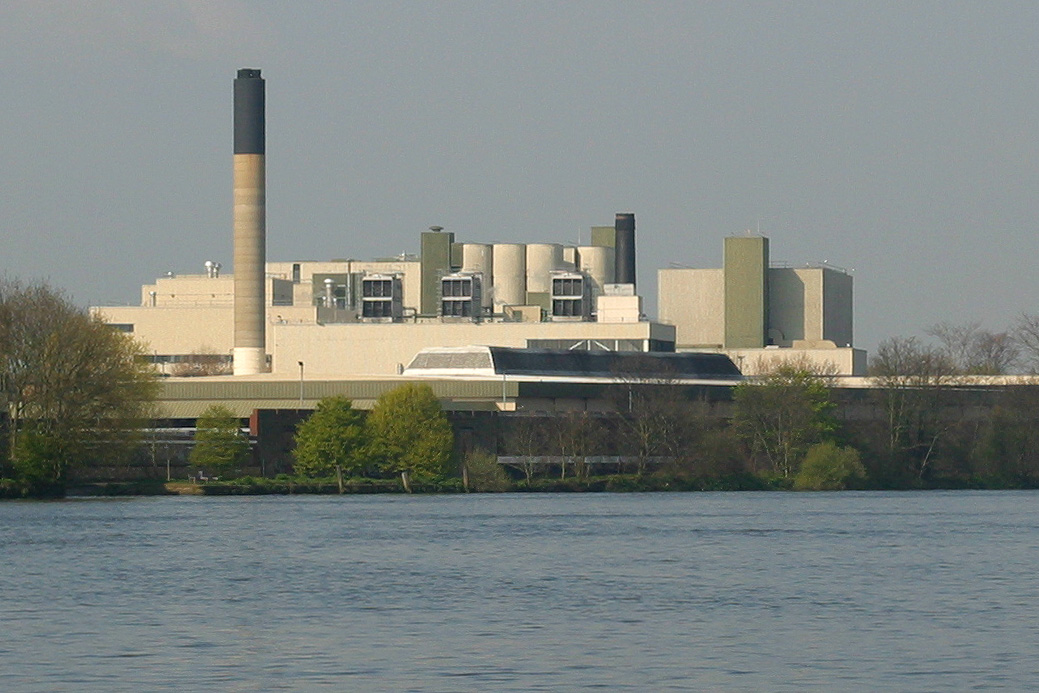
The former Budweiser Stag Brewery

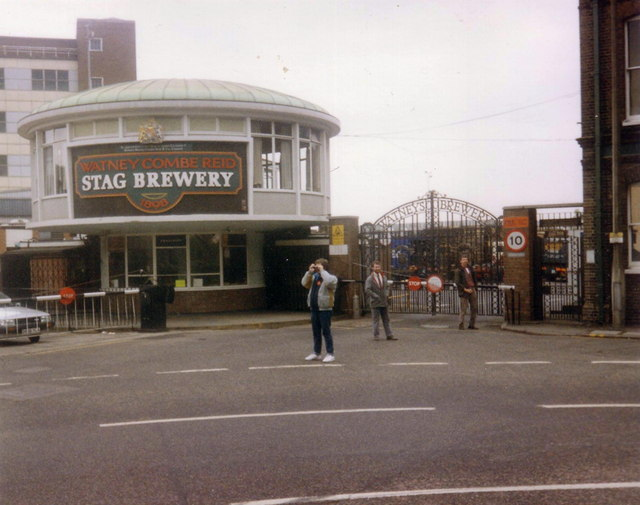
The Stag Brewery, Mortlake in 1989

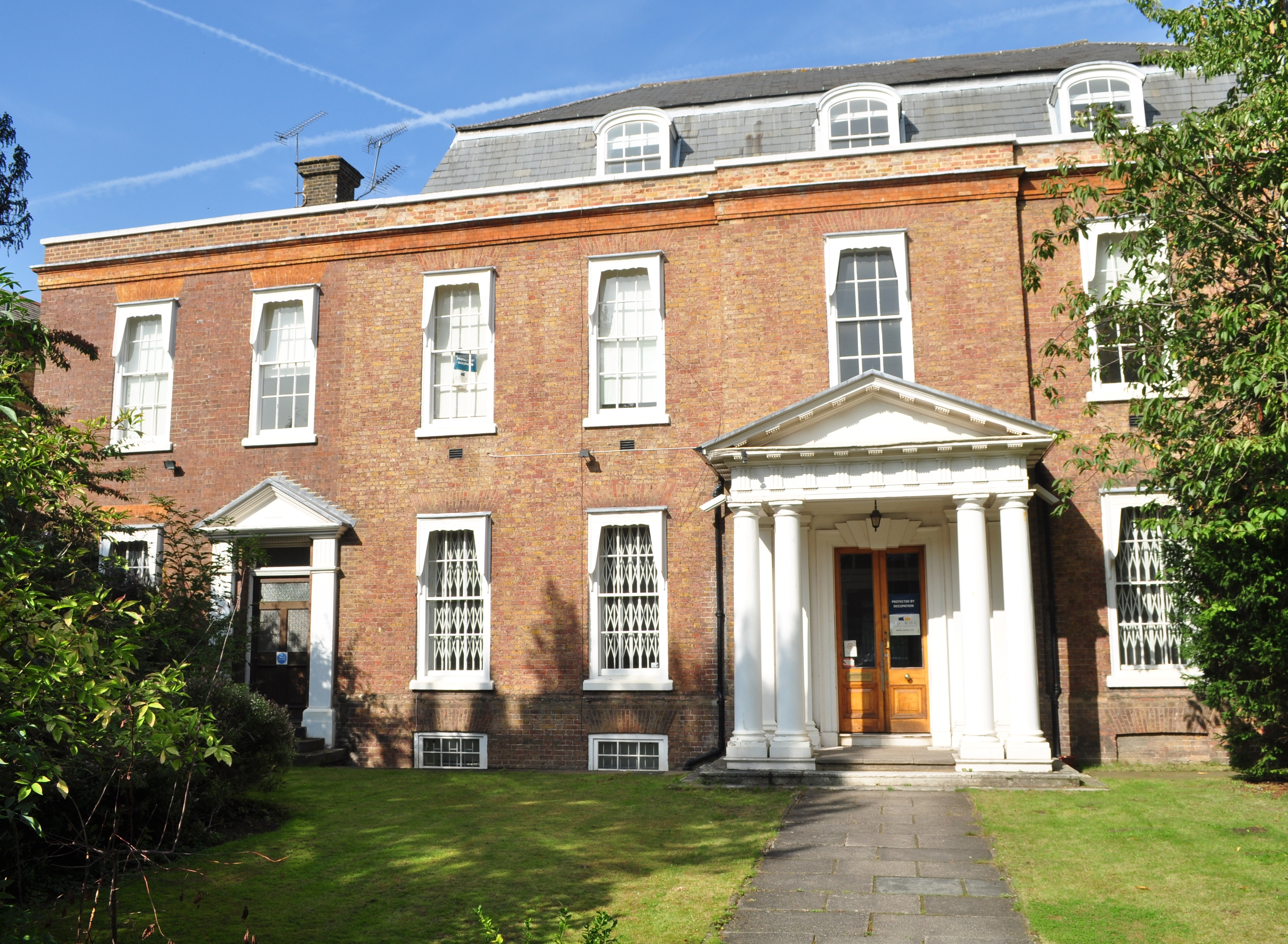
123 Mortlake High Street was built in 1720. From 1895 until 1940, it was the seat of local government for the Municipal Borough of Barnes (which was abolished in 1965).

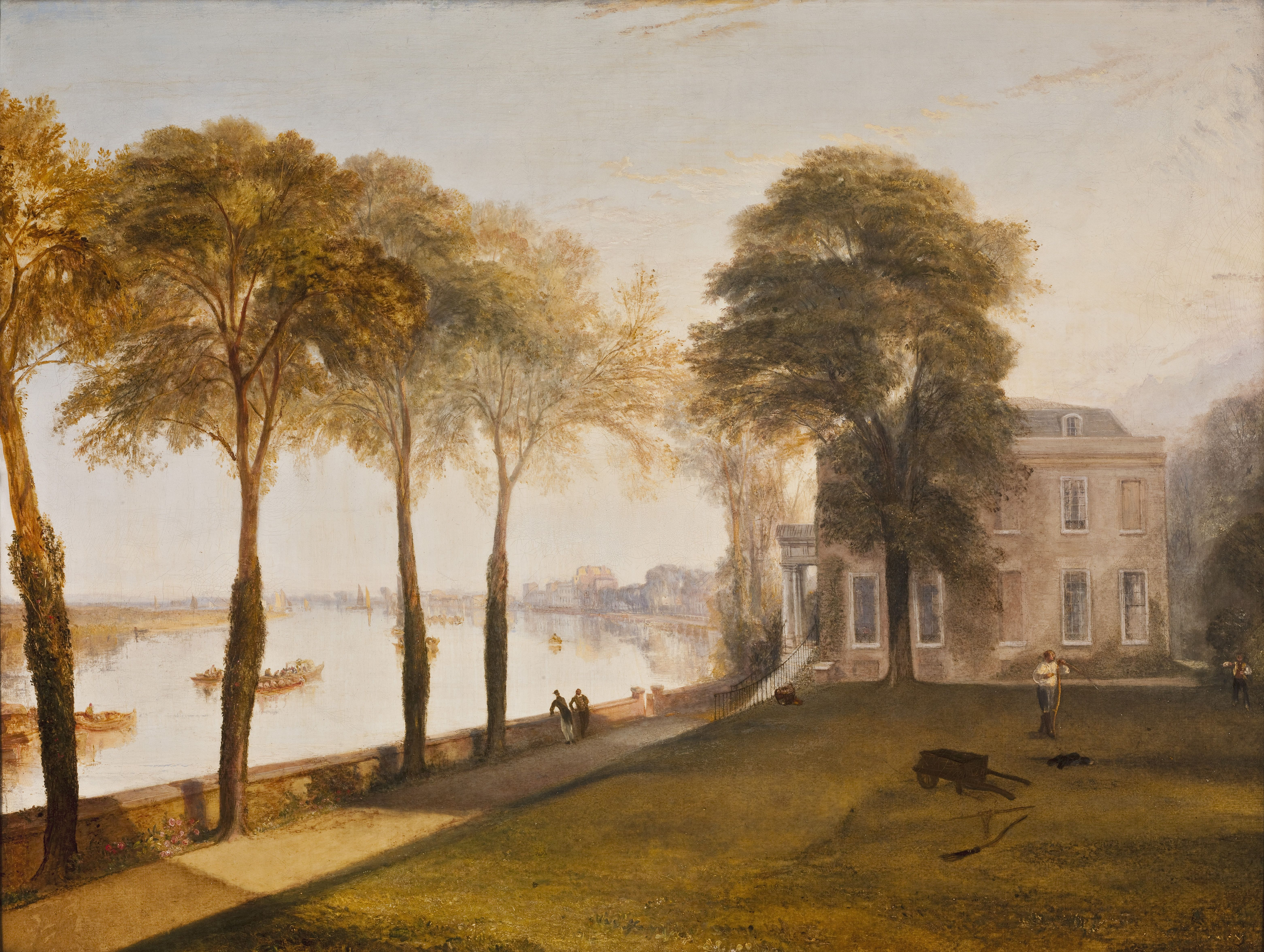
Mortlake Terrace: Early Summer Morning by Turner, 1826

In the 1840s Charles James Philips and James Wigan acquired Mortlake Brewery, which had existed since the 15th century.

In 1889 the brewery was acquired by James Watney & Co., which in 1898 became Watney Combe & Reid after acquiring Messrs. Combe Delafield and Co. and Messrs. Reid and Co. When Watney's Stag Brewery in Victoria, London, was demolished in 1959, the name was 30 years later, applied to Mortlake Brewery. Being the last phase of The Boat Race which refers to all the traditional local names, it is still widely referred to as the Mortlake Brewery.

The brewery became part of Scottish Courage, briefly part of Heineken and was then divested to Anheuser-Busch Europe Ltd as it produced the company's Budweiser pale lager. In January 2009, Anheuser-Busch InBev said that the company was proposing to close the Stag Brewery in 2010 as a result of a merger between InBev and Anheuser-Busch. In November 2015, it was announced that the site had been sold for £158m to Reselton – part of Singapore's City Developments, which also bought the former Teddington Studios. The brewery closed in December 2015 and there are plans to build 850 apartments on the 22-acre (9-hectare) location.

== Amenities ==
Mortlake affords an undistracted view of the river as its riverside promenade is set by its buildings including the former brewery, unlike the embankment style roads along other London banks such as in Barnes until Barnes Bridge.

The two large pubs at either end of the riverside promenade are not listed buildings:

- The White Hart
- The Ship

Places of worship include:

- St Mary Magdalen Roman Catholic Church Mortlake
- St Mary the Virgin Mortlake (Anglican)

== Transport ==
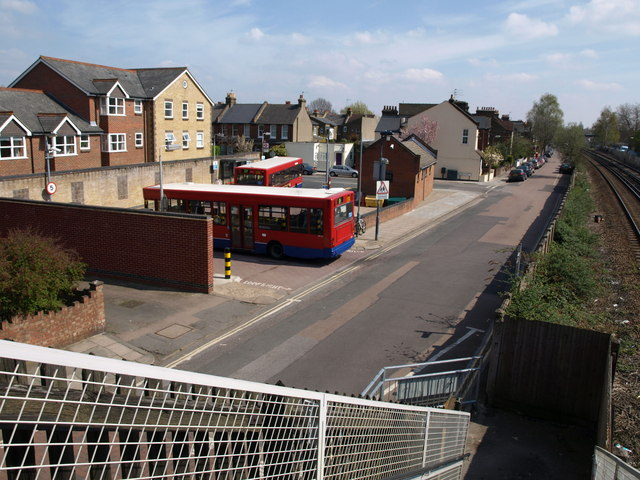
The terminus of London Buses route 209 at North Worple Way, Mortlake

=== Adjoining districts ===
- Barnes
- Chiswick (Grove Park, after which is Old Chiswick or Strand-on-the-Green, depending on direction)
- East Sheen
- Kew

=== Nearest railway stations ===
- Mortlake railway station
- Barnes Bridge railway station
- North Sheen railway station

These are minor stops on the Waterloo–Reading line which has four branch lines: to Windsor Riverside station, to Weybridge and back to the London terminus via Kingston upon Thames or Brentford. The stations are only served by trains on the latter two lines, as services to Windsor or Reading bypass both.

This railway is a narrow bisector of the settlement, being generally on the flat with its streets, which tend to run perpendicular to it. It runs in the middle of Worple Way, separating it into north and south sides.

Adjacent to Mortlake Station is Queen Victoria's old Waiting Room – now occupied by a classic car showroom – built for her and Prince Albert as they frequented White Lodge in Richmond Park, where their family and later their son, Prince of Wales (later Edward VII ) lived.

== Demography and housing ==
To ensure that all the local authority wards have electorates of approximately the same size, the ward covering Mortlake also includes parts of Barnes.

2011 Census homes
Ward	Detached	Semi-detached	Terraced	Flats and apartments	Caravans/temporary/mobile homes/houseboats	Shared between households
Mortlake and Barnes Common	167	547	1,765	2,453	1	8

2011 Census households
Ward	Population	Households	% Owned outright	% Owned with a loan	hectares
Mortlake and Barnes Common	10,919	4,771	27	32	185
