= St Filumena's Church, Caverswall =

Church of St Filumena
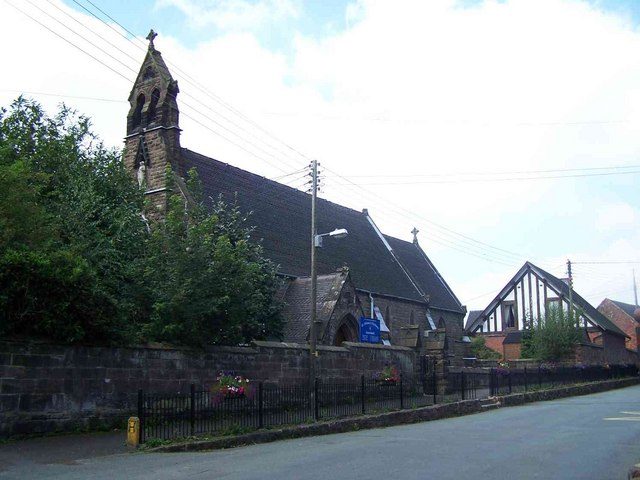
- Church of St Filumena
- 52°58′58.692″N 2°4′26.296″W
- OS grid reference: SJ 95131 42850
- Location: Caverswall, Staffordshire
- Country: England
- Denomination: Roman Catholic

Architecture
- Heritage designation: Grade II listed
- Designated: 8 August 1986
- Architect: Gilbert Blount
- Completed: 1864

Administration
- Diocese: Archdiocese of Birmingham

St Filumena's Church is a Roman Catholic church in Caverswall, in Staffordshire, England, and in the Archdiocese of Birmingham. The building, completed in 1864, is Grade II listed.

== History ==
In 1811, Walter Hill Coyney of Weston Coyney and his Roman Catholic wife arranged for a group of Benedictine nuns from Ghent to settle in Caverswall Castle, where they opened a chapel for public services. The nuns moved to Oulton Abbey in 1851, and Caverswall was then served from St Gregory's Church in Longton, where there had been a resident priest since 1822.

In 1863, the foundation stone for the church in Caverswall was laid by the Bishop of Birmingham, William Bernard Ullathorne. The building, designed by Gilbert Blount, was funded by Sir Percival Radcliffe, owner of Caverswall Castle. The church was opened on 28 January 1864.

== Description ==
The building is of coursed stone, with a tiled roof. There is a bellcote at thw west end. The nave, higher than the chancel, has lancet windows and a south porch. Inside, there is a gallery in the west, and there is a pointed chancel arch. The chancel ceiling has painted rectagular panels, and the reredos, of 1923, has mosaic and opus sectile decorations.

== See also ==
- Listed buildings in Caverswall
