= Listed buildings in Caverswall =

Caverswall is a civil parish in the district of Staffordshire Moorlands, Staffordshire, England. It contains 19 listed buildings that are recorded in the National Heritage List for England. Of these, one is listed at Grade I, the highest of the three grades, one is at Grade II*, the middle grade, and the others are at Grade II, the lowest grade. The parish contains the village of Caverswall and the surrounding area. In the parish is Caverswall Castle, a country house on the site of an earlier castle; this is listed together with associated structures. St Peter's Church, dating from the 12th century, is listed, together with items in the churchyard. The other listed buildings consist of houses and farmhouses, another church, a former public house, and a milepost.

== Key ==
Grade	Criteria
I	Buildings of exceptional interest, sometimes considered to be internationally important
II*	Particularly important buildings of more than special interest
II	Buildings of national importance and special interest

== Buildings ==
Name and location	Photograph	Date	Notes	Grade
St Peter's Church; 52.98245°N 2.07332°W		Late 12th century	The church was altered during the following centuries, and was restored in 1880 by Charles Lynam. It is built in sandstone with tile roofs, and consists of a nave with a clerestory, north and south aisles, a chancel with a south vestry, and a west tower. The tower has three stages, diagonal buttresses, a three-light west window, and an embattled parapet with small corner pinnacles.	II*
Caverswall Castle, screen walls, gatehouse and bridge 52.98263°N 2.07460°W	—	13th century	Much of the superstructure of the castle, later a country house, dates from about 1615, and it was altered and extended in about 1890. It is built in sandstone and has embattled parapets. The castle forms a roughly oblong enclosure, with four polygonal angle turrets. The front has three storeys and cellars on a plinth, three bays, and a single storey porch flanked by bay windows. The other windows are mullioned and transomed. There is a square stair tower, and the gatehouse and angle towers have tile roofs and balustraded parapets. The bridge has two round arches and a balustrade.	I
Stone House; 52.98375°N 2.07402°W	—	17th century	The house, which has been altered, has a T-shaped plan, consisting of cross-wing in stone, and a range in painted brick, and the roofs are tiled. The cross-wing is gabled and has two storeys, an attic and a cellar, a string course, and a roof with verge parapets, copings, and corbelled kneelers. The range has two storeys; in both parts there are casement windows, those in the ground floor of the range with segmental heads.	II
Former Hope and Anchor Public House; 53.02513°N 2.06519°W		18th century	A house, later a public house and subsequently used for other purposes, it is in painted rendered brick, and has a tile roof with coped verge parapets. There are two storeys, three bays, and a rear wing. The central doorway has a pediment, and the windows are casements with segmental heads.	II
Hardwick Farmhouse; 52.99700°N 2.06699°W	—	Late 18th century	The farmhouse is in painted brick with dentilled eaves and a tile roof. There are two storeys and three bays. The central doorway has a Tuscan doorcase with a pediment, and the windows are casements with segmental heads.	II
Church wall and piers, St Peter's Church; 52.98274°N 2.07342°W	—	Late 18th century (probable)	The wall on the north and east sides of the churchyard has moulded coping. The piers are in rusticated stone and have corniced capping and ball finials.	II
Wood memorial 52.98233°N 2.07329°W	—	1794	The memorial is in the churchyard of St Peter's Church, and is to the memory of Mary Wood. It is a chest tomb in stone, and has inscribed sides, inset pilasters at the angles with moulded bands, and a top slab with a moulded edge.	II
Group of two chest tombs and one pedestal tomb 52.98234°N 2.07356°W	—	c. 1800	The tombs are in the churchyard of St Peter's Church, and are in stone, and have different designs.	II
Group of eight chest tombs 52.98259°N 2.07361°W	—	c. 1800	The chest tombs are in the churchyard of St Peter's Church. They are in stone and have different designs, all with angle pilasters.	II
Wilshaw memorial and enclosure 52.98260°N 2.07338°W	—	1817	The memorial is in the churchyard of St Peter's Church, and is to the memory of Elizabeth Wilshaw. It is a pedestal tomb in stone on a plinth, and has a shield-shaped surround, a moulded surbase, and an urn finial. The tomb is enclosed by cast iron railings.	II
4 The Square; 52.98363°N 2.07445°W		Early 19th century	The house is in painted rendered brick and has a tile roof. There are two storeys and two bays. The central doorway has a fanlight and a pediment on console brackets, and the windows are sashes with wedge lintels grooved to imitate voussoirs, and raised keystones.	II
Bank House Farmhouse; 52.98616°N 2.07425°W	—	Early 19th century	A red brick farmhouse with dentilled eaves and a tile roof, it has three storeys and three bays. The central doorway has a fanlight and a Tuscan porch with a pediment. The windows are casements with wedge lintels ramped up to moulded keystones, and those in the ground floor are in shallow bay windows with corniced heads.	II
Dovehouse Farmhouse; 52.98187°N 2.07386°W	—	Early 19th century	The farmhouse is in red brick with a tile roof. There are two storeys, an L-shaped plan, and a front of three bays. In the centre is a Tuscan doorcase, the doorway has a fanlight with diagonal glazing bars, and the windows are sashes with painted wedge lintels.	II
St Filomena's Church; 52.98300°N 2.07386°W		1863–64	A Roman Catholic church designed by Gilbert Blount, it is in stone with a tile roof. The church consists of a nave, a south porch. and a lower chancel. At the west end is a window with a pointed head, above which is a niche with a statue, and on the gable end is a bellcote. The windows in the nave are lancets.	II
East Lodge and wall, Caverswall Castle; 52.98273°N 2.07359°W	—	1890	The lodge is in red sandstone and has floor bands and an embattled parapet. There are two storeys and three bays. On the front is a three-sided bay window, the other windows are mullioned and transomed, and above a round-arched doorway is a hood mould and an initialled and dated panel. Attached to the lodge is a balustraded screen wall.	II
West Lodge, Caverswall Castle; 52.98228°N 2.07812°W	—	c. 1890	The lodge is in red sandstone, and has raised string courses and an embattled parapet. There are two storeys and three bays. On the front is a diagonally-facing bay window, and the other windows are mullioned and transomed. There is a round-arched doorway with a hood mould, and a recessed panel containing a coat of arms in low relief.	II
Steps and balustrading, Caverswall Castle; 52.98253°N 2.07450°W	—	c. 1890	The balustrade is on a plinth, and runs along the front of the castle. In the centre is a flight of six steps, and these are flanked by four bays of fretted strapwork, containing rusticated piers with ball finials.	II
Sundial, Caverswall Castle; 52.98245°N 2.07450°W	—	c. 1890 (possible)	The sundial is in the grounds of the house. It is in red sandstone, about 1,200 millimetres (47 in) high, and in the form of a baluster with a banded capital. The top and dial have been replaced.	II
Milepost at SJ 958 475; 53.02486°N 2.06350°W		Early 20th century (possible)	The milepost is on the south side of the A52 road. It is in cast iron, and has a triangular section and a sloping top. On the top is "CELLARHEAD", and on the sides are the distances to Bucknall, Hanley, Stoke-on-Trent, Leek, Newcastle-under-Lyme, Froghall, Cheadle, and Ashbourne.	II
