= St Gregory's Church, Longton =

Church of St Gregory
- Church of St Gregory
- 52°59′16.872″N 2°8′18.528″W
- OS grid reference: SJ 90801 43418
- Location: Longton, Stoke-on-Trent
- Country: England
- Denomination: Roman Catholic

Architecture
- Heritage designation: Grade II listed
- Designated: 13 May 2021
- Architect: Frederick King
- Completed: 1970

Administration
- Diocese: Archdiocese of Birmingham

St Gregory's Church is a Roman Catholic church in Heathcote Road in Longton, Stoke-on-Trent, England, and in the Archdiocese of Birmingham. The building, completed in 1970, has been Grade II listed since 2021.

== History ==
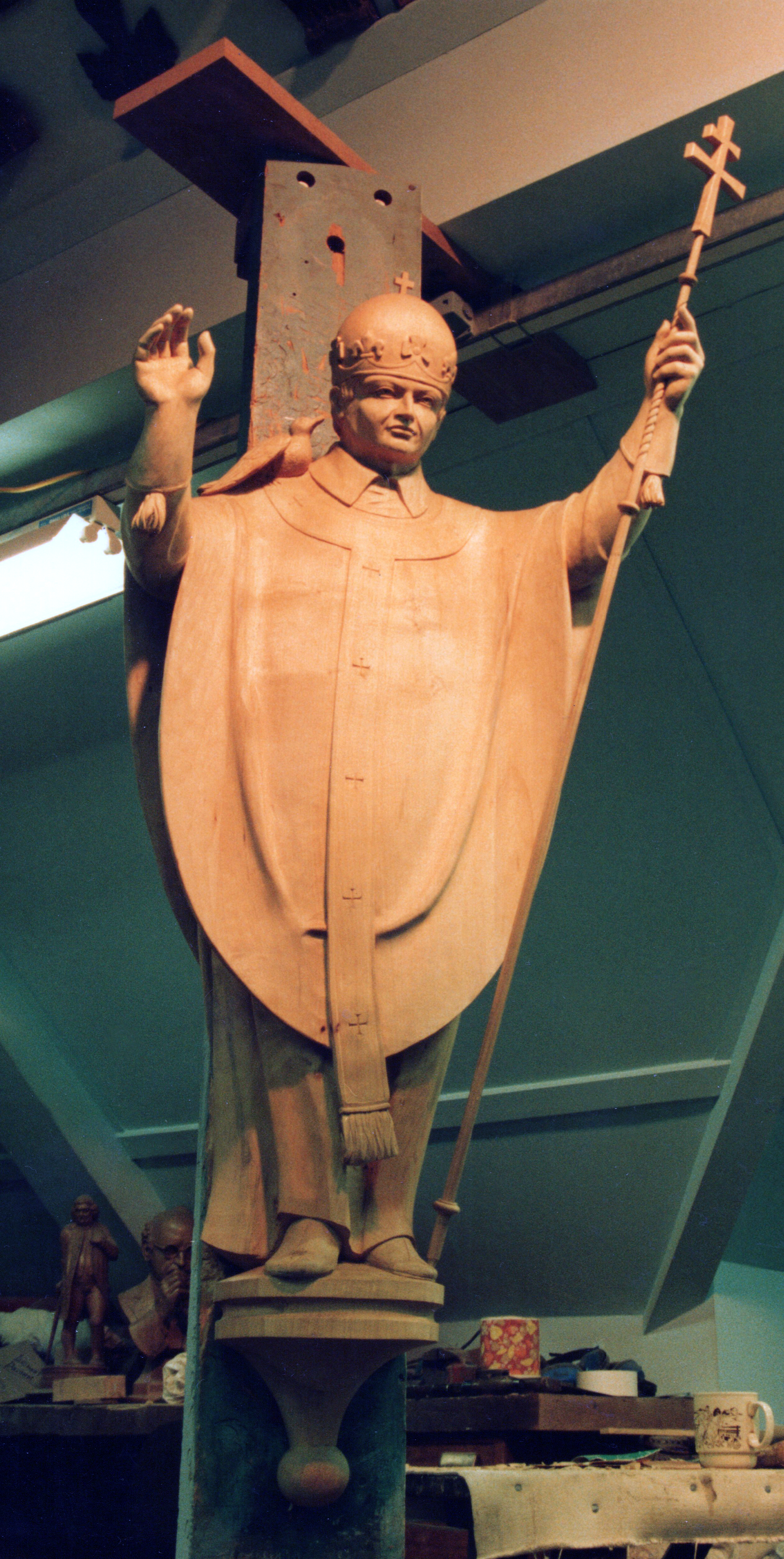
Completed figure carved by Denis Alva Parsons of St Gregory the Great in workshop, prior to installing at St Gregory's Church, Longton

In 1811, Walter Hill Coyney of Weston Coyney and his Roman Catholic wife arranged for a group of Benedictine nuns from Ghent to settle in Caverswall Castle, where they opened a chapel for public services.

A small church in Longton dedicated to St Gregory was opened in 1819 by Walter Hill Coyney; it was a brick building in Gothic style, between Gregory Street and Griffin Street, and was initially served from Caverswall and Cresswell. From 1822 there was a resident priest.

In 1868–1869, a church designed by E. W. Pugin was built in Heathcote Road. It was a tall brick building in Gothic style, with aisles and a clerestory; a presbytery was added in 1880. The earlier church became the parish hall.

Because of structural problems caused by mining subsidence, Pugin's church was demolished in 1968. It was replaced by a building designed by Frederick King, of Wood, Goldstraw and Yorath, erected on a concrete raft foundation in 1968–1970.

== Description ==
There is a rounded entrance-front facing south-east, consisting of five recessed bays of concrete with narrow windows, below which, under a canopy, are three double doors reached by four steps. It leads into a wide narthex, which curves around the south-east front.

The main body of the church is a double-height semi-circular structure with a flat roof. Adjoining this are a presbytery, of two storeys, and single-storey blocks, all with flat roofs.

Inside, there is a fan-shaped nave, with timber pews following the curve of the space to face the sanctuary. Above the sanctuary, which is on an oblong round-ended platform, is a roof lantern of similar shape. The ribs of the roof structure radiate from the lantern.
