= Mary Francis Ames =

British children's writer, novelist

- Born: Mary Frances Leslie Miller; December 1860; Newcastle-upon-Tyne, England
- Died: 22 August 1914 (aged 53); London, England

Mary Frances Ames, born Mary Frances Leslie Miller (December 1860 – 22 August 1914), wrote and illustrated children's books and humorous books for adults in the United Kingdom and Canada. She published as Mrs Ernest Ames, sometimes in collaboration with her husband.

== Author and illustrator ==
Her first book was An ABC, for Baby Patriots (1899), which was used for teaching children the alphabet. This was an enormous success with Queen Victoria reportedly buying over a hundred copies. A review noted "This alphabet is composed of amusing topical verses, ably illustrated by full-page coloured plates. These are as vivid in their colouring as they are most humorous in conception". "The drawings are exceptionally clever, and the colouring a distinct novelty. The verses are also exceedingly smart."

The book describes the British Empire for children from the late Victorian viewpoint at the height of British imperial power. The verses and illustrations can be seen as glorifying British military power, the monarchy, and colonialism, but Ames also wrote humorous, politically satirical works aimed at adults so her writing could also be seen as an exaggerated satire of nationalism.

This was also a period of heightened tension in the Mediterranean between France and Britain. This might explain why the globe in the illustration for the letter E shows the Mediterranean, rather than India, with a caricature of a pipe smoking man whose eye is Paris. British Gibraltar and Malta are highlighted in red; these were on the route to the Suez Canal and India. The French poodle is holding a cane and is depicted as a young woman (Marianne). The young sulking child is wearing a distinctive Pickelhaube (German helmet), a caricature of German militarism. The 1890s saw the Scramble for Africa with Lord Salisbury following a policy of "Splendid Isolation" without having formal European alliances. Cecil Rhodes was pursuing a policy of a Cape to Cairo railway while signing misleading treaties with various African peoples, so perhaps the cartoon for W is also a satire.

A is the Army

That dies for the Queen;
It's the very best Army
That ever was seen,

E is our Empire
Where sun never sets;
The larger we make it
The bigger it gets.

K is for Kings;
Once warlike and haughty,
Great Britain subdued them
Because they'd been naughty.

O is the Ocean
Where none but a fool
Would ever dare question
Our title to rule

Q is our Queen!
It fills us with pride
To see the Queen’s coach
When the Queen is inside!

W is the Word
Of an Englishman true;
When given, it means
What he says, he will do.

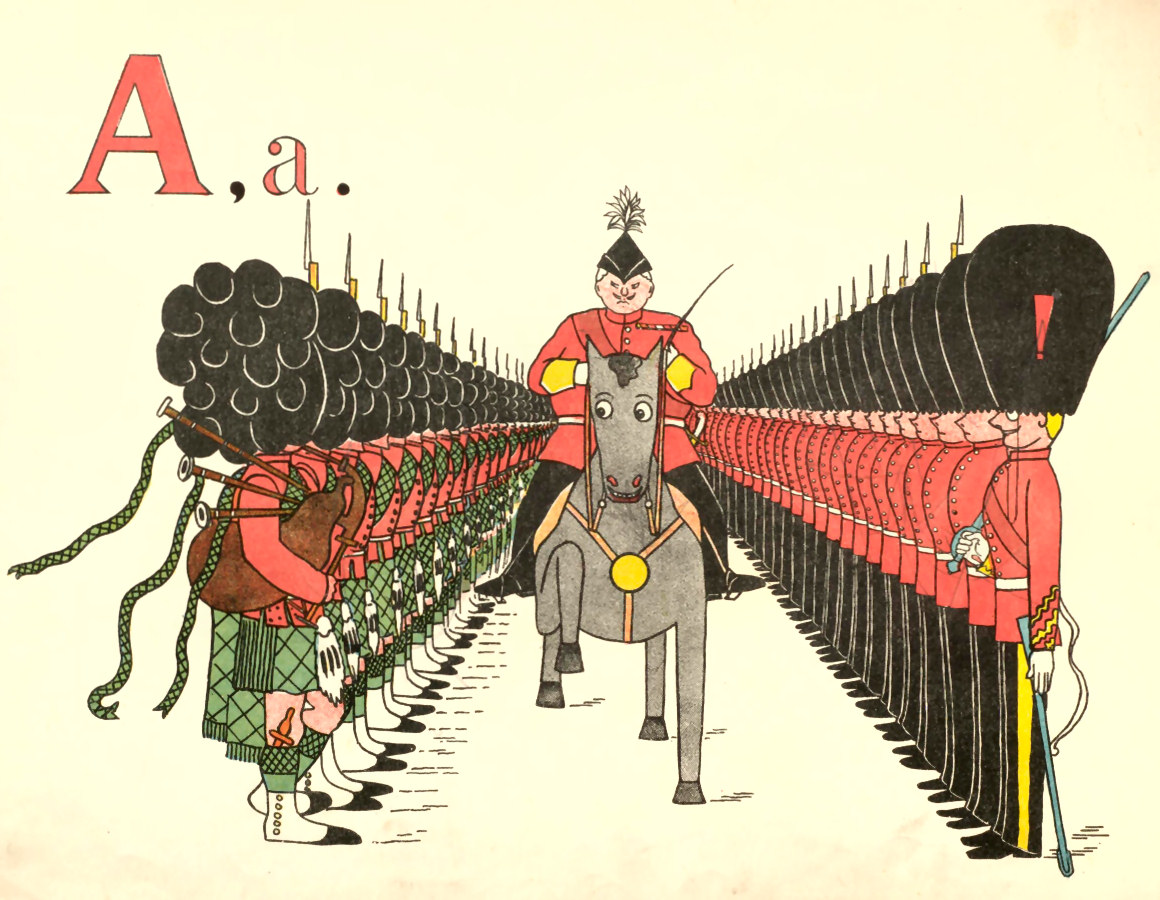
A is the Army

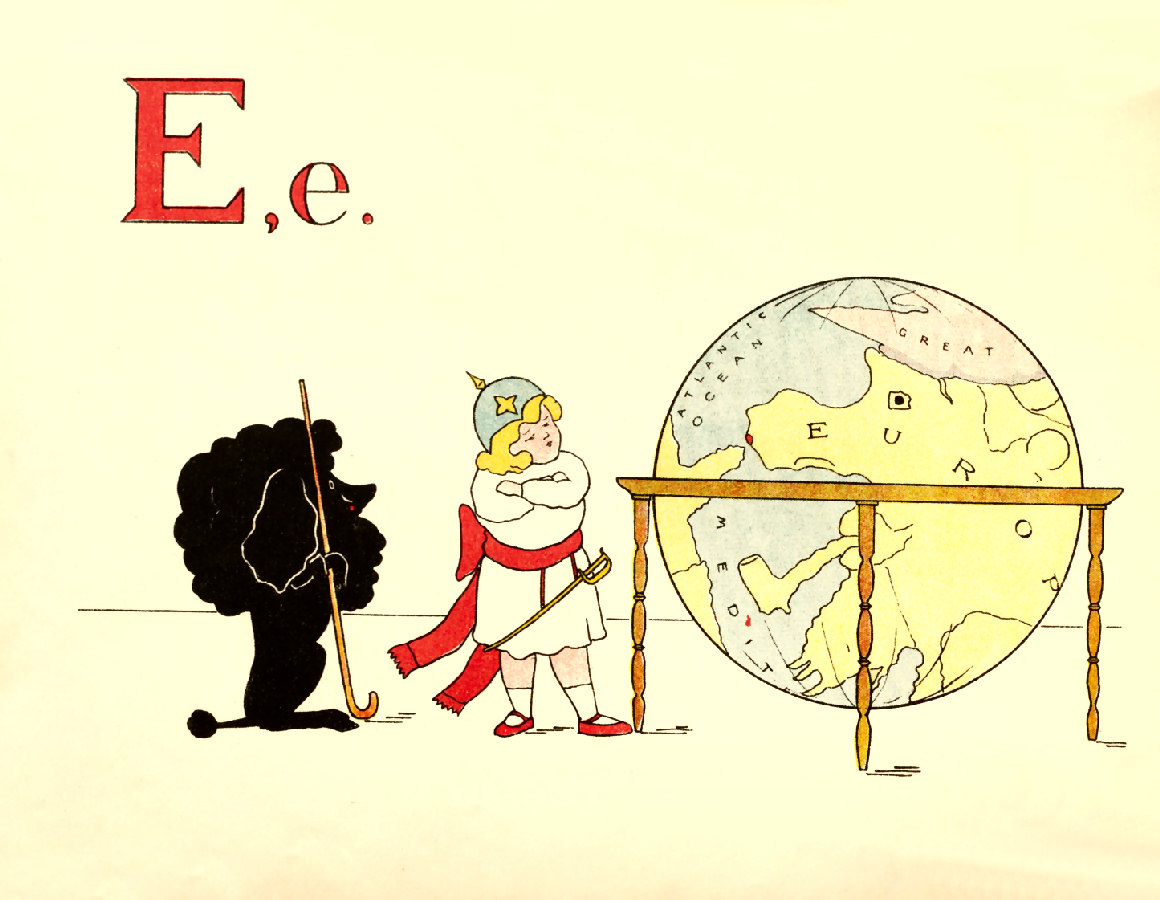
E is our Empire

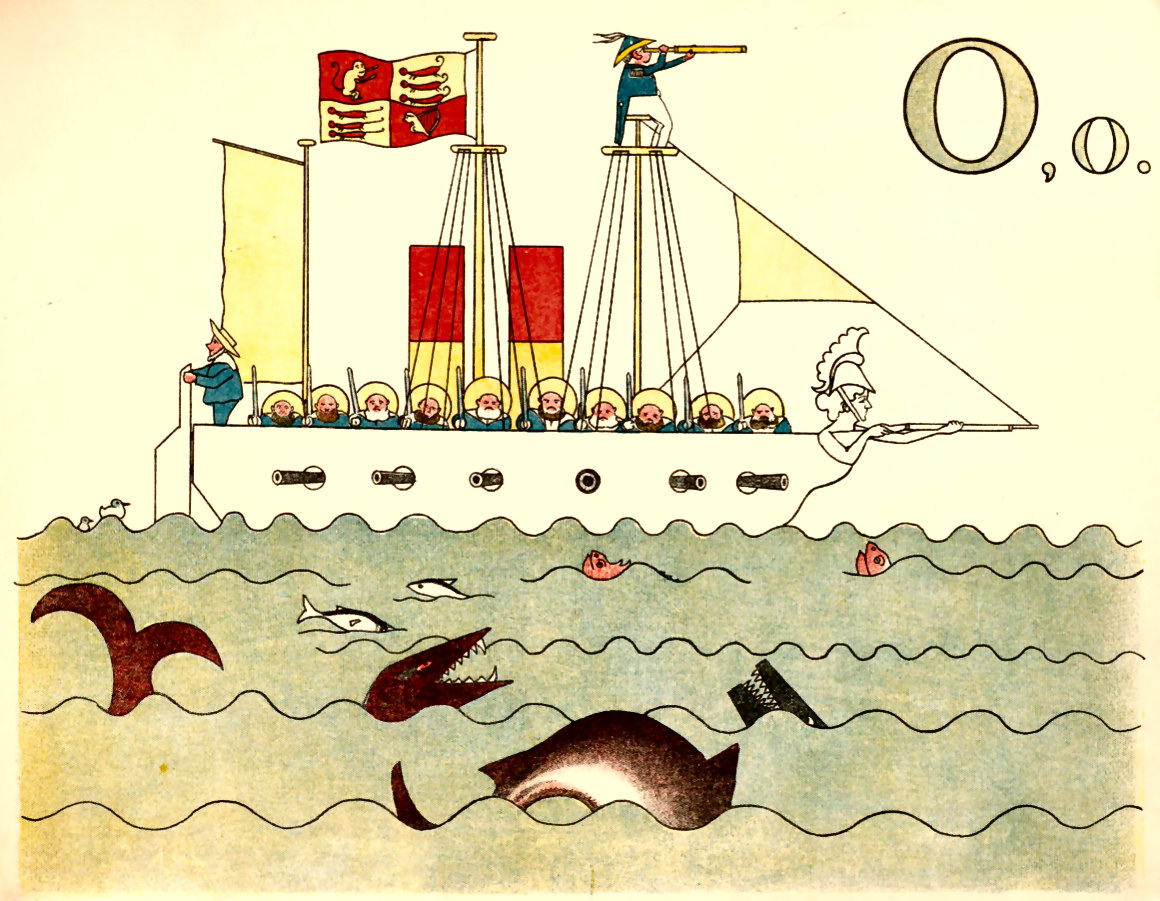
O is the Ocean

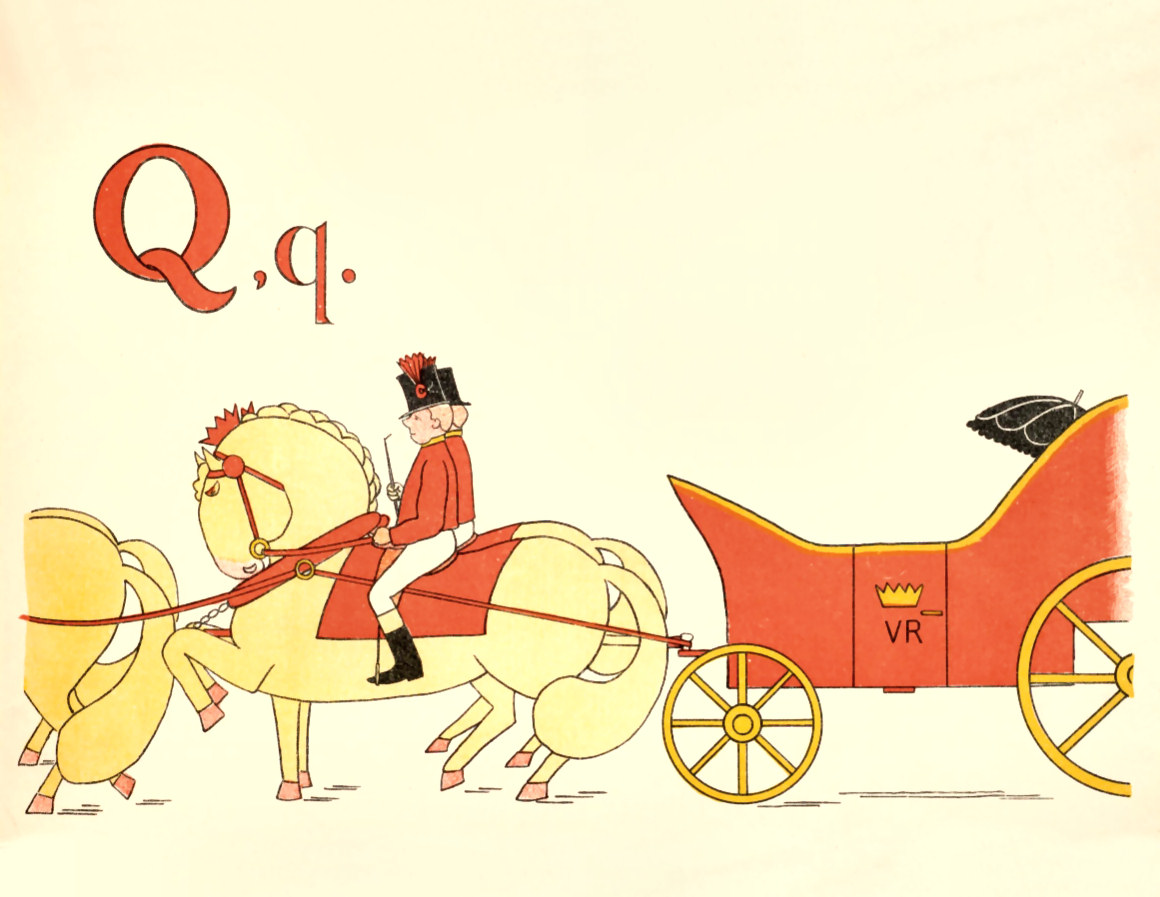
Q is our Queen!

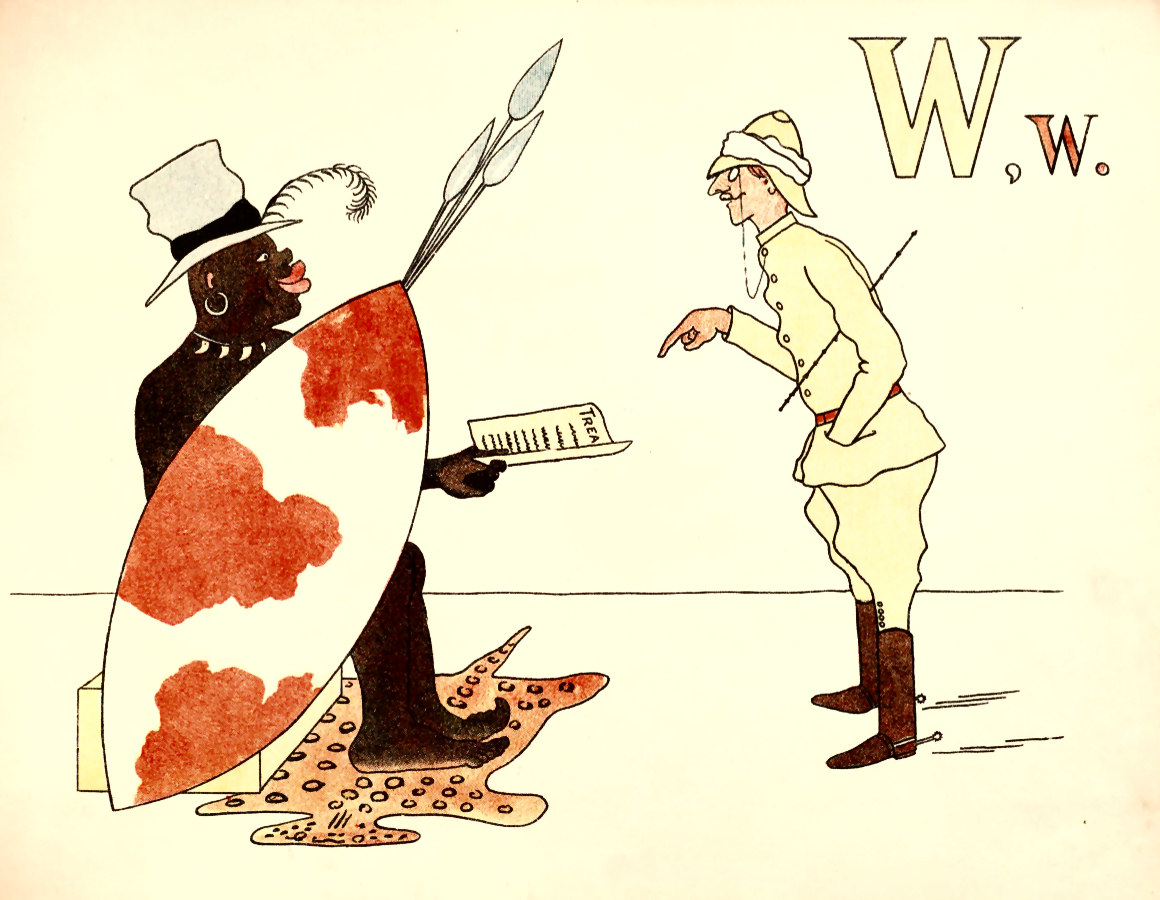
W is the Word

The review of The Great Crusade: an alphabet for everybody noted that "If Free Trade is a suitable subject for the nursery we could imagine no more delightful way of conveying it to the infant mind than by the study of this book. But Mrs Ames's humour and her drawings are, we need hardly say, intended for grown-ups." Comparisons were made with A Book of Nonsense by Edward Lear and Hilaire Belloc.

The review of Wonderful England!: Or, The Happy Land noted that "A happy vein of satire runs through this book from the first page to the last. Verses and pictures are indeed amusing, and though the former will be appreciated by grown-ups, the latter will appeal to youngsters." It was "a clever satire with some really droll pictures in it, but in no sense suited for children or likely to interest them."

== Illustrator ==
Ames also illustrated The Maid's Progress (1901) to accompany text written by her husband Ernest Fitzroy Ames. The review in The Graphic described that it "very neatly hits off the wiles and weaknesses of the fashionable damsel and her chaperone, and is thoroughly amusing as a satire on London Society of the present day." The Pall Mall Gazette records that “The spirit of the book is one of mirthful, rather than severe, satire, and the reader follows the career of the Maid with a delighted interest, and with many a laugh.”

In Really and Truly! Or, the Century for Babes "The rhymes and pictures deal each with some striking event of the century, from a comic standpoint." These include The first United Parliament (1801), Matthew Flinders' circumnavigation of Australia (1802), Trafalgar (1805), Waterloo (1815), the opening of London Zoo (1826), the first railways (1830), New London Bridge (1831), The abolition of Slavery (1833), Accession of Queen Victoria (1837), the Penny Post (1840), Repeal of the Corn Tax (1846), the Crimea War (1855), the first Atlantic Cable (1858), Board Schools established (1870), Brother Jonathan of the United States and John Bull of England in the Great Rapprochement of 1898, and Khartoum College (1900).

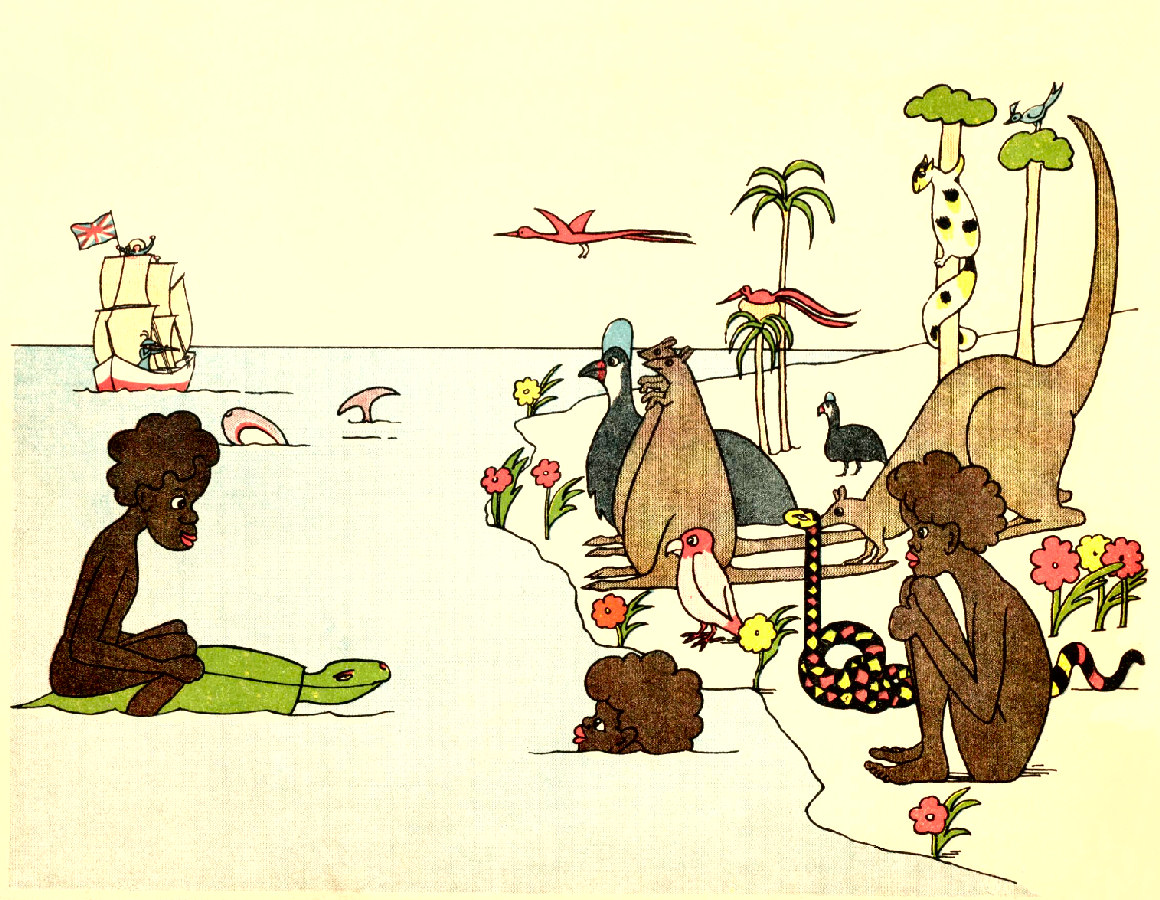
1802 Australia

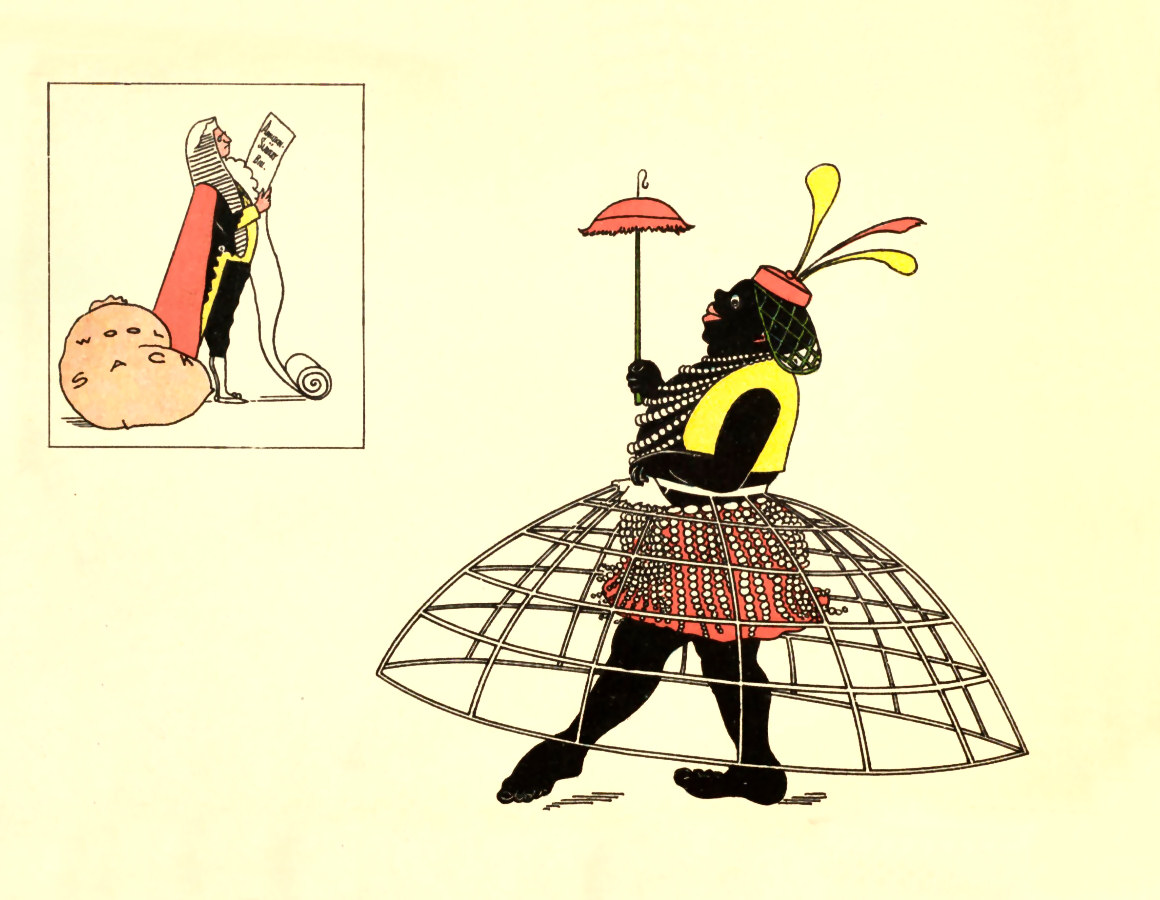
1833 Abolition of Slavery

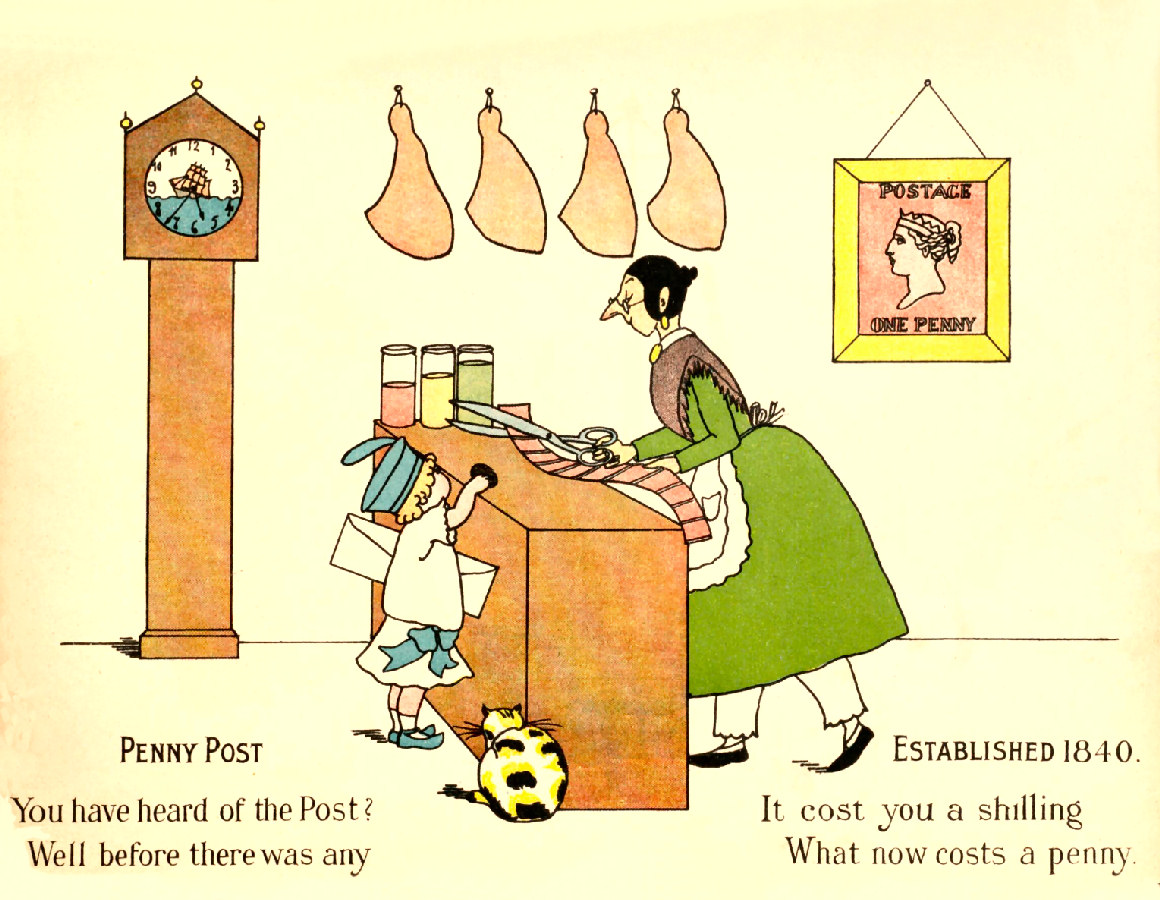
The 1840 Penny Post

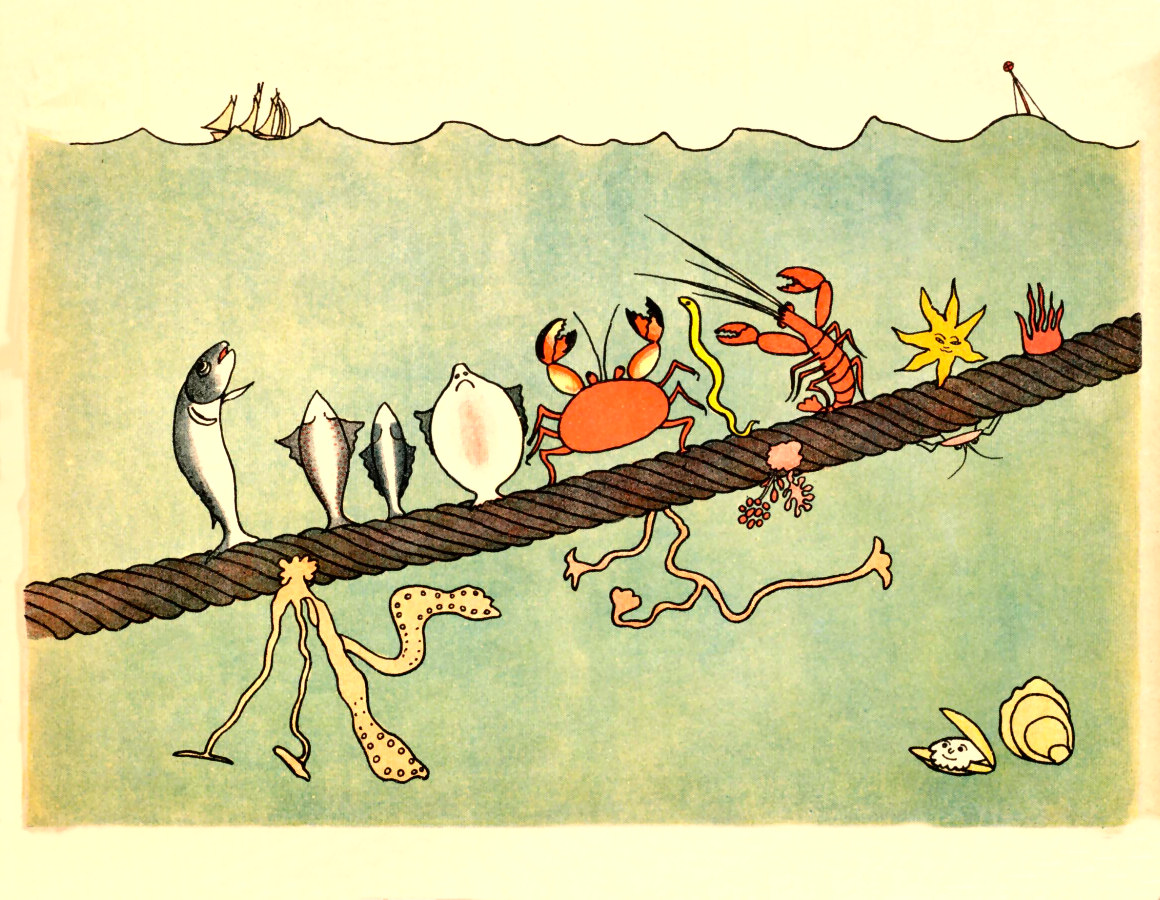
1858 The First Atlantic Cable

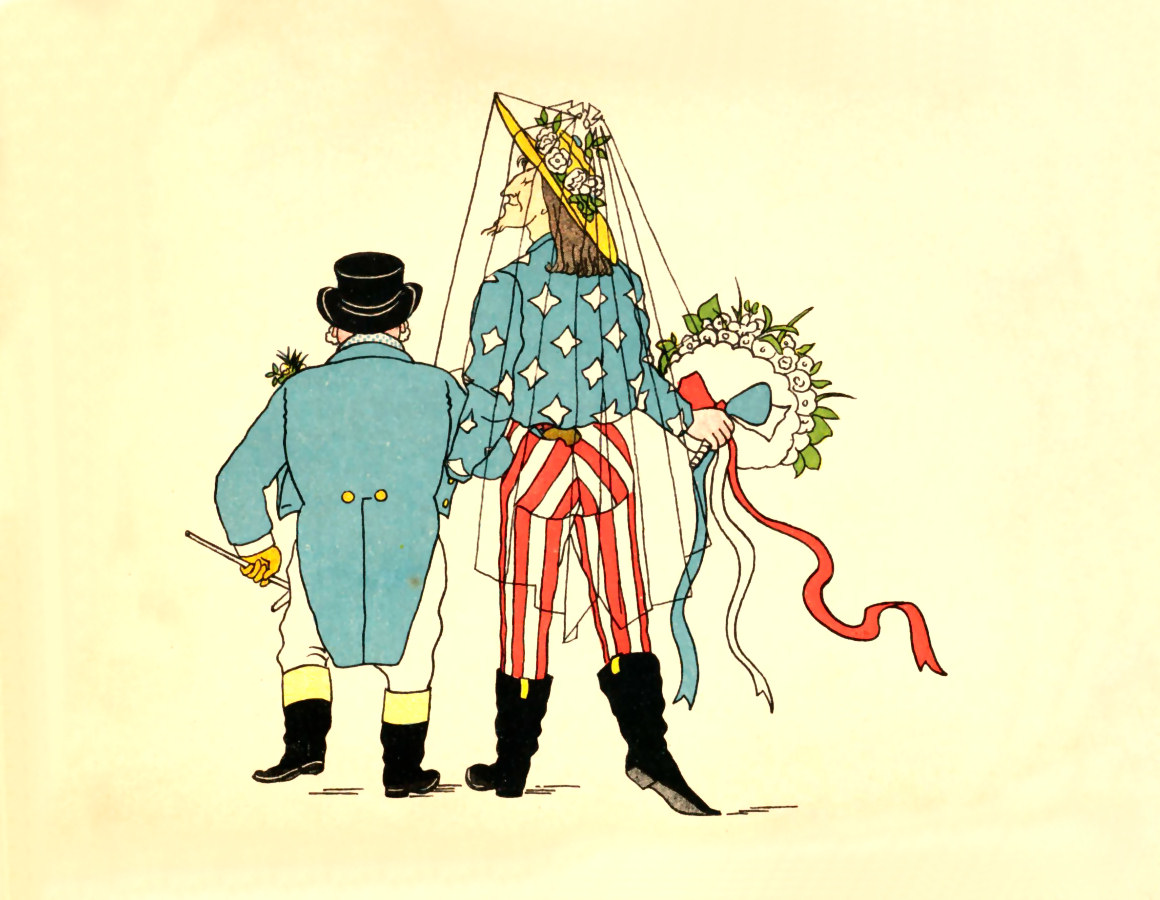
1898 Rapprochement

Sessional: Big Ben ballads (1906) was a political satire, reviewed as a "Clever adaptions of nursery rhyme associations to 'taking off' the leading boys in the political school at Westminster." It included the verse

Hark! Hark! a German barque
Is landing beggars in town,
And Herbert of Leeds, full of noble deeds,
Is hastening, hurrying down.
"Oh stay, oh stay, good people all
There is nothing we will not do,
To give you a hand and to help you land,
This country was made for you."

which is about Herbert Asquith and the Anglo-German naval arms race.

Little Bowles-peep
Has lost his seat,
And cannot tell where to find it;
In great distress
He writes to the Press,
But nobody seems to mind it.

The Tremendous Twins or How the Boers Were Beaten (1900) about the recent Boer War raised some "misgivings. The twins are funny enough in the gaily-coloured drawings, but the war is too new, too tragically near to us, to be the subject of humour.And is it not a mistake to involve the nursery in such a drama of pity and terror?" The Bookseller noted that "the coloured cartoons of their exploits are uncommonly witty and too the point. Without betraying any political secrets, we may say that, beginning with the picture of the twins "waking up" the W.O., to their falling upon the neck of F.M. the C.I.C. in S.Africa, and the flight of Oom Paul, the Twins' portrait gallery is an unqualified success. In particulat, note the "presentment" of the Empress Queen!"

Ames also contributed to the Daily Chronicle, The Westminster Gazette, the British Review, The Ladies' Field, and The Speaker. She drew cartoons for the Daily Chronicle, the Daily News, The Ladies' Field, and the Tatler. She was a member of the Ladies’ Grand Council of the Primrose League.

== Publications ==
- An ABC, for Baby Patriots (1899). Dean & Son
- The Bedtime Book (1901). Grant Richards
- Wonderful England!: Or, The Happy Land (1902). Grant Richards
- Tim and the Dusty Man (1903). Grant Richards
- The Great Crusade: an alphabet for everybody (1903). Simpkin, Marshall and Co.
- Little Red Fox (1908). Duckworth & Co.
- Watty: a white puppy (1913). Duckworth & Co.

Ames also illustrated text by her husband:

- Really and Truly! Or, the Century for Babes (1899). Edward Arnold
- The Tremendous Twins or How the Boers Were Beaten (1900)
- The Maid's Progress (1901). Grant Richards
- Sessional: Big Ben ballads (1906).

== Personal life ==
Mary Frances Leslie Miller was born in Newcastle upon Tyne in December 1860, the daughter of Patrick Leslie Miller, a Presbyterian minister of John Knox Church, Newcastle. She married Ernest Fitzroy Ames (1855–1920) on 3 January 1895 at Brompton Oratory, Kensington, and was presented to the Queen. They lived with his family at 37, Eaton Square before moving in 1896 to 31, Ovington Square.

As a child she had drawn "ambitious religious pictures and curious cut-out pictures in white paper, representing crosses with supporting angels on either side, the crosses carved like fine lace, and every detail of the angels' wings carefully reproduced." She abandoned drawing but took it up again after her marriage, "in her own natural and untrammelled bent towards the delineation of what might be called the edge of form, drawing of course, from the live model." She had her studio in her house in Ovington Square. She also developed "portraiture in fine pencil, with the face and hair, perhaps, a scarf or sash delicately tinted, a return to the fashion which had great vogue about a hundred years ago."

She converted to Catholicism in 1899. In 1901 they had four servants and Ernest gives his occupation as "Civil engineer". By 1906 they lived at 46, Green Street, Mayfair. In 1911 they were visiting her married sister in Hertfordshire and Ernest gives his occupation as "Civil engineer, (Ret), artist". They moved to Oak Lodge, Ham Common, London, about 1913. Ames died on 22 August 1914 and was buried on 28 August at St Mary Magdalen Church, Mortlake, following a requiem funeral service at St Agatha's Church, Kingston upon Thames.

Ernest Fitzroy Ames was born in 1855 at Hyde, Bedfordshire and attended Haileybury College. He was an associate of the Institution of Civil Engineers, elected in 1892. For five years he worked on the Manchester waterways, then worked four years in Florida growing oranges and engineering. He next worked three years as assistant-engineer on the Mexican National Railway and district engineer on the Inter-oceanic Railway, followed by three years working on the railway in Venezuela. Ernest was also an amateur artist who exhibited his watercolour paintings. He was a Fellow of the Royal Geographical Society.

Ernest remarried in 1918 at Windsor to a widow, Blanche Mary Dawson. He died on 6 February 1920 in South Kensington and was buried in Mortlake. He left over £16,000 in his will.
