= May Probyn =

English poet

Juliana Mary Louisa Probyn, known as May Probyn (12 April 1856 – 29 March 1909) was an English poet, one of a group of lively and somewhat political British fin de siècle poets.

She was born in Avranches, France. Her parents were the writer John Webb Probyn and Mary Christiana née Spicer; and the novelist and short-story writer Sophie Dora Spicer Maude was a cousin. She was the first love of William Satchell, who published the first two of her three books of poetry. She published a novel in 1878, and became a Catholic convert in 1883. Among her friends were W. B. Yeats, Thomas Westwood, the fishing writer, Vernon Lee, and Katharine Tynan, with whom in 1895 she published Christmas Verses, consisting of four poems by Probyn and two by Tynan.

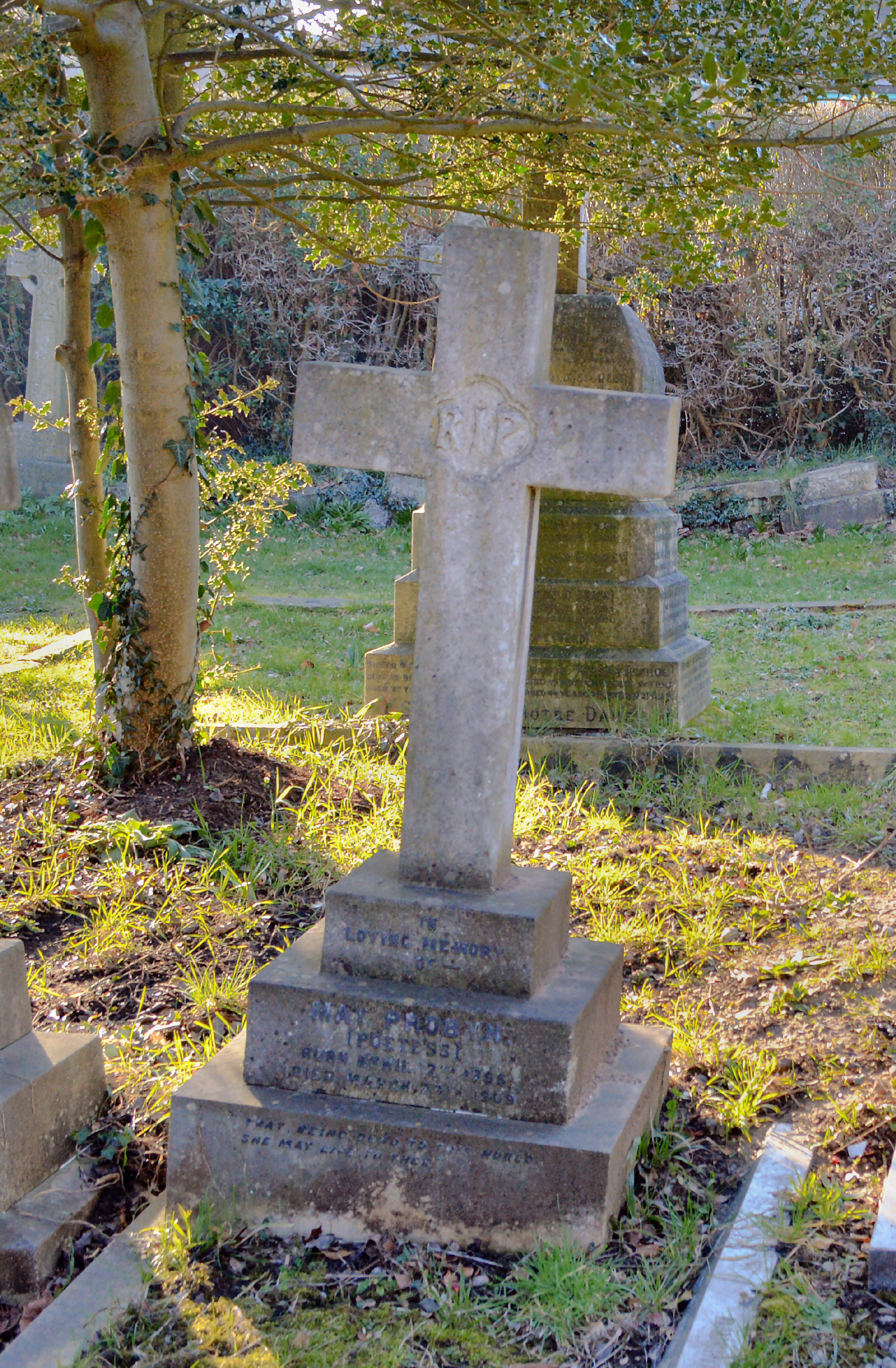
St Mary Magdalen, Mortlake

Probyn is buried in St Mary Magdalen Roman Catholic Church, Mortlake. Her grave is inscribed 'That, being dead to this world, she may live to thee'.

A number of Probyn's poems have been set to music, including "Vilanelle" by Jacques Blumenthal in 1899 and "Come What Will, You Are Mine To-day" by Henry Kimball Hadley in 1909.

== Works ==
- Once! Twice! Thrice! and Away! A Novel. (1878)
- Robert Tresilian. A Story (1880)
- Who Killed Cock Robin? (1880)
- Poems (1881)
- A Ballad of the Road, and Other Poems (1883)
- Pansies: A Book of Poems (1895)

Her poem "Is it nothing to you" is in the Oxford Book of English Verse.

== Sources ==
- "May Probyn", in Thesing, William B. Victorian Women Poets, 1998. Volume 199 of the Dictionary of Literary Biography.
