= René le Brun, Comte de L'Hôpital =

English painter

René le Brun, Comte de L'Hôpital (5 May 1877 – 4 November 1929) was an English artist.

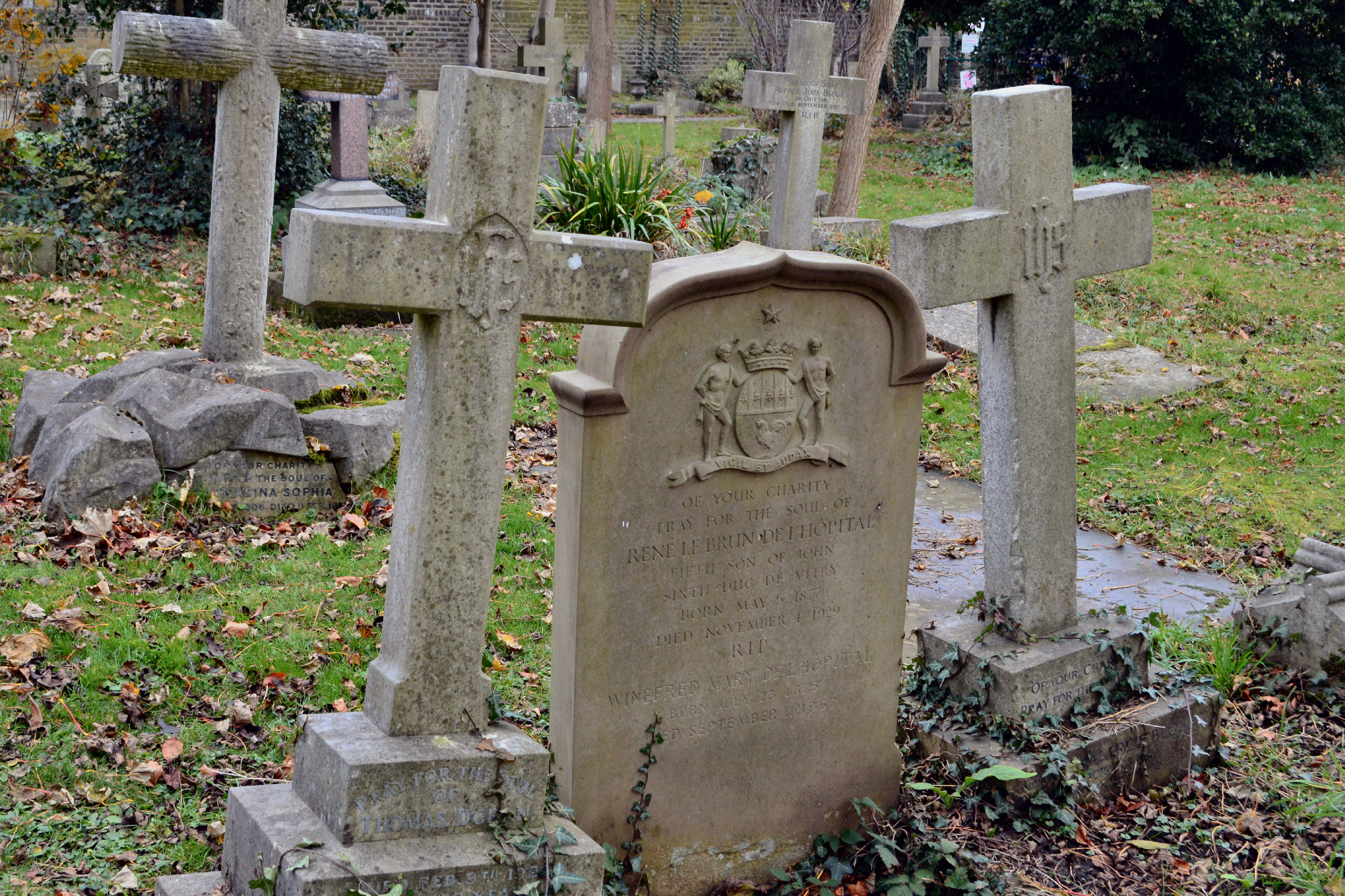
Grave, St Mary Magdalen, Mortlake

L'Hôpital was the son of 6th Duc de Viry. He studied at the Royal Academy in London. His best known works are the illustrations he did for the Encyclopædia Britannica Eleventh Edition (1911) and his portraits of Pope Leo XIII, Sir Alfred Scott-Gatty and Prince Arthur of Connaught.

He is buried at St Mary Magdalen, Mortlake, together with his wife, Winefride de l’Hôpital, eldest daughter of the architect J F Bentley and author of Westminster Cathedral and Its Architect (1919).
