= St Mary Magdalen Roman Catholic Church, Mortlake =

Church in Mortlake, London

Coordinates: 51.4683°N 0.2618°W

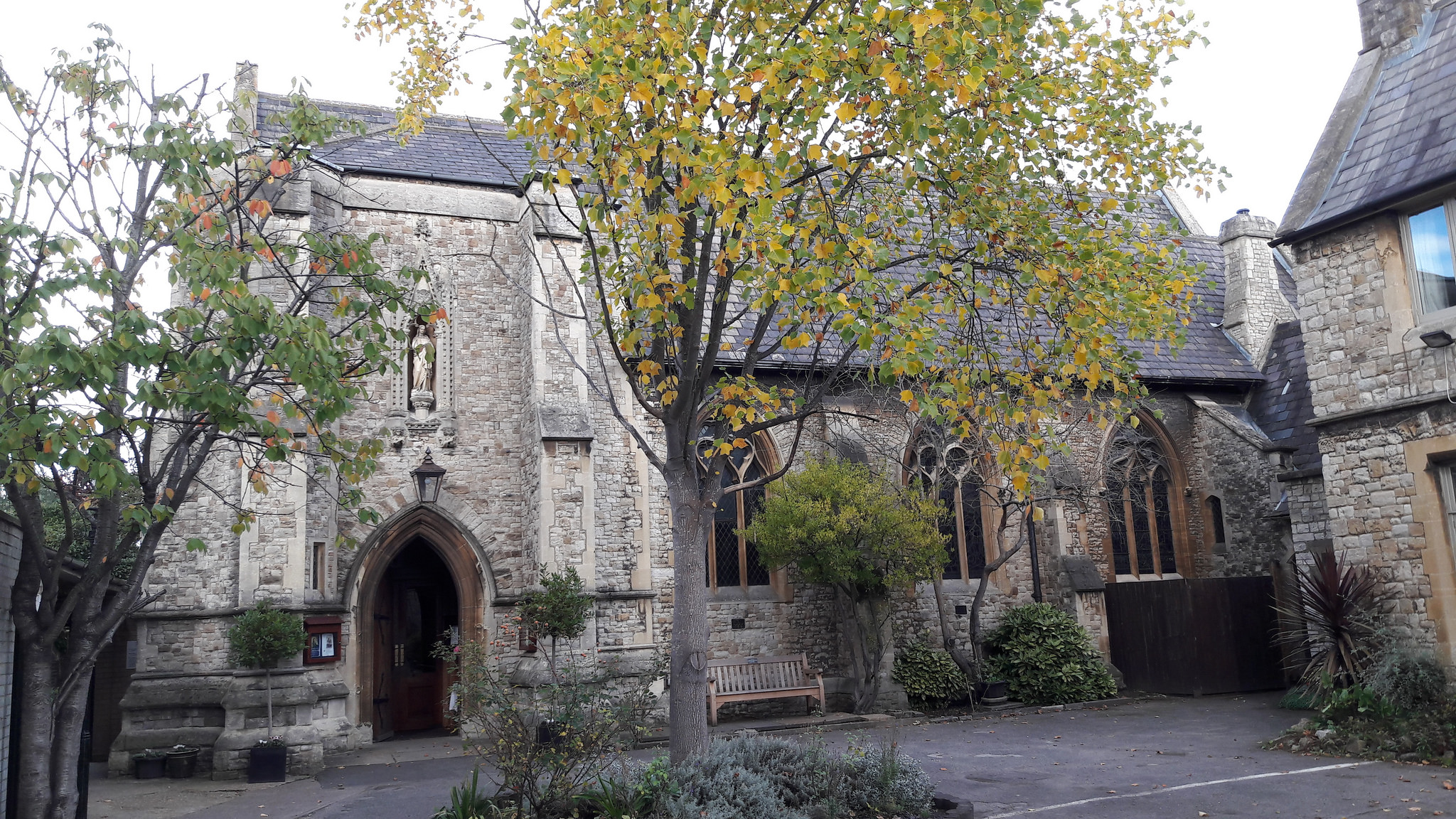
- St Mary Magdalen Roman Catholic Church, Mortlake
- OS grid reference: TQ 20831 75802
- Location: 61 North Worple Way, Mortlake, London SW14 8PR
- Country: England
- Denomination: Roman Catholic
- Website: www.stmarymags.org.uk

Architecture
- Architect: Gilbert Blount
- Style: Gothic Revival
- Years built: 1852

Administration
- Province: Southwark
- Diocese: Roman Catholic Archdiocese of Southwark
- Deanery: Mortlake
- Parish: Mortlake

Clergy
- Priest: Fr Adrian McKenna-Whyte

St Mary Magdalen Roman Catholic Church, Mortlake, is a Roman Catholic church in North Worple Way, Mortlake, in the London Borough of Richmond upon Thames. The church is dedicated to Jesus' companion Mary Magdalene. It is located just south of Mortlake High Street and the Anglican St Mary the Virgin Church. St Mary Magdalen's Catholic Primary School is just north of the churchyard.

The church building, in Gothic Revival style, was designed by Gilbert Blount, architect to the first Archbishop of Westminster, Nicholas Wiseman, and dates from 1852.

== History ==
The church's first parish priest, Fr John Wenham, was a convert from the Oxford Movement, who had studied at Magdalen College, Oxford, and had been an Anglican army chaplain in Ceylon. He is buried in the churchyard.

== Stained-glass windows ==
The east window, by William Wailes (c.1850), shows St Mary Magdalen, centre, with the Noli me tangere scene to the right and, in the left two lights, a scene from Luke's Gospel.

The west window is 20th century with the theme "Through Cross to Crown". It depicts Noli me tangere, the Crucifixion, Our Lady Queen of Heaven, and the Ascension.

In the Lady Chapel the east window depicts St Catherine of Siena, St Mary and St Robert of Arbrissel. It was a gift of Catherine Strickland-Standish (d.1863). The north window depicts the Annunciation.

The Sacred Heart window depicts Mary receiving Communion, with the Sacred Heart in the centre; on the right is St Margaret Mary Alacoque. Below is a scene from the Last Supper.

The Law memorial window (c.1886), depicts St William, Our Lady, Star of the Sea, and St Francis Xavier. It commemorates the Hon. William Towry Law (1809–86), a former Chancellor of the Diocese of Bath and Wells, who converted to Catholicism in 1851. His son, Rev. Augustus Henry Law SJ (1833–80), died in Rhodesia as a missionary priest. Below is a representation of William Towry Law at prayer and his son during his last illness. Law is buried in the cemetery.

The First World War memorial window depicts St George and St Patrick either side of St Michael the Archangel.

The Burton window depicts St Mary Magdalen, St Joseph (Richard Burton was born on his feast day), and St Agnes. Below, Sir Richard Burton is depicted as a knight at prayer.

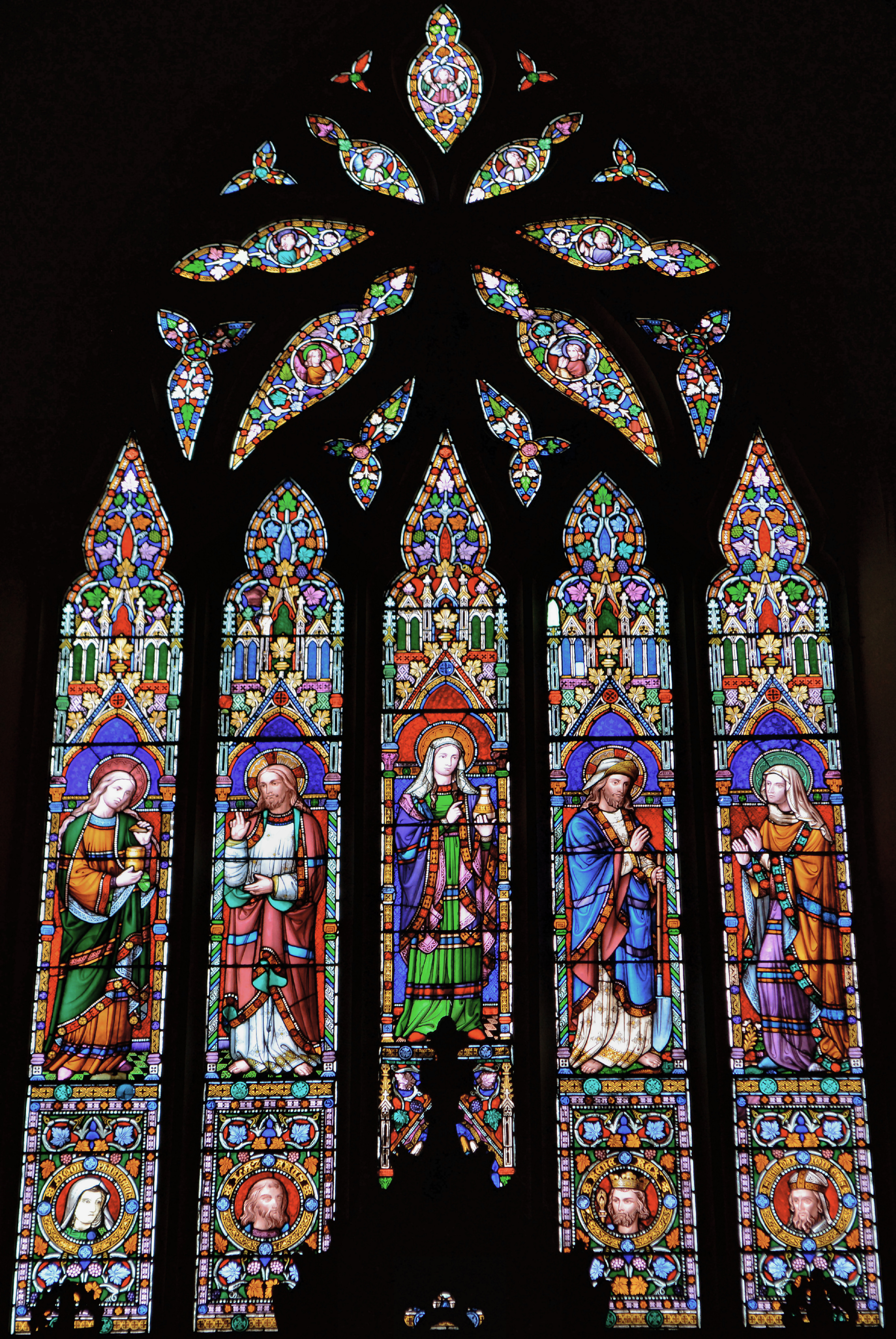
East window

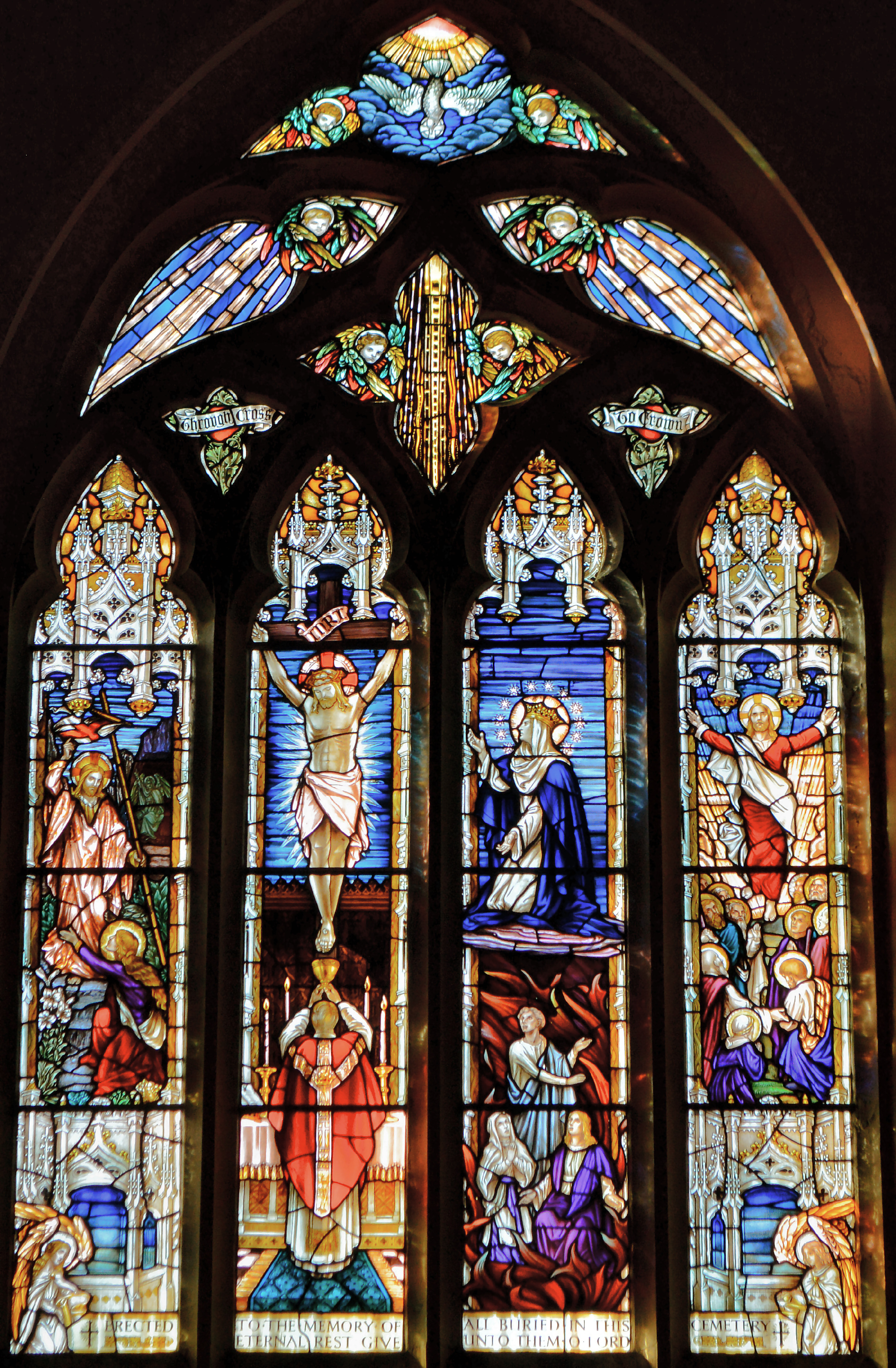
West window

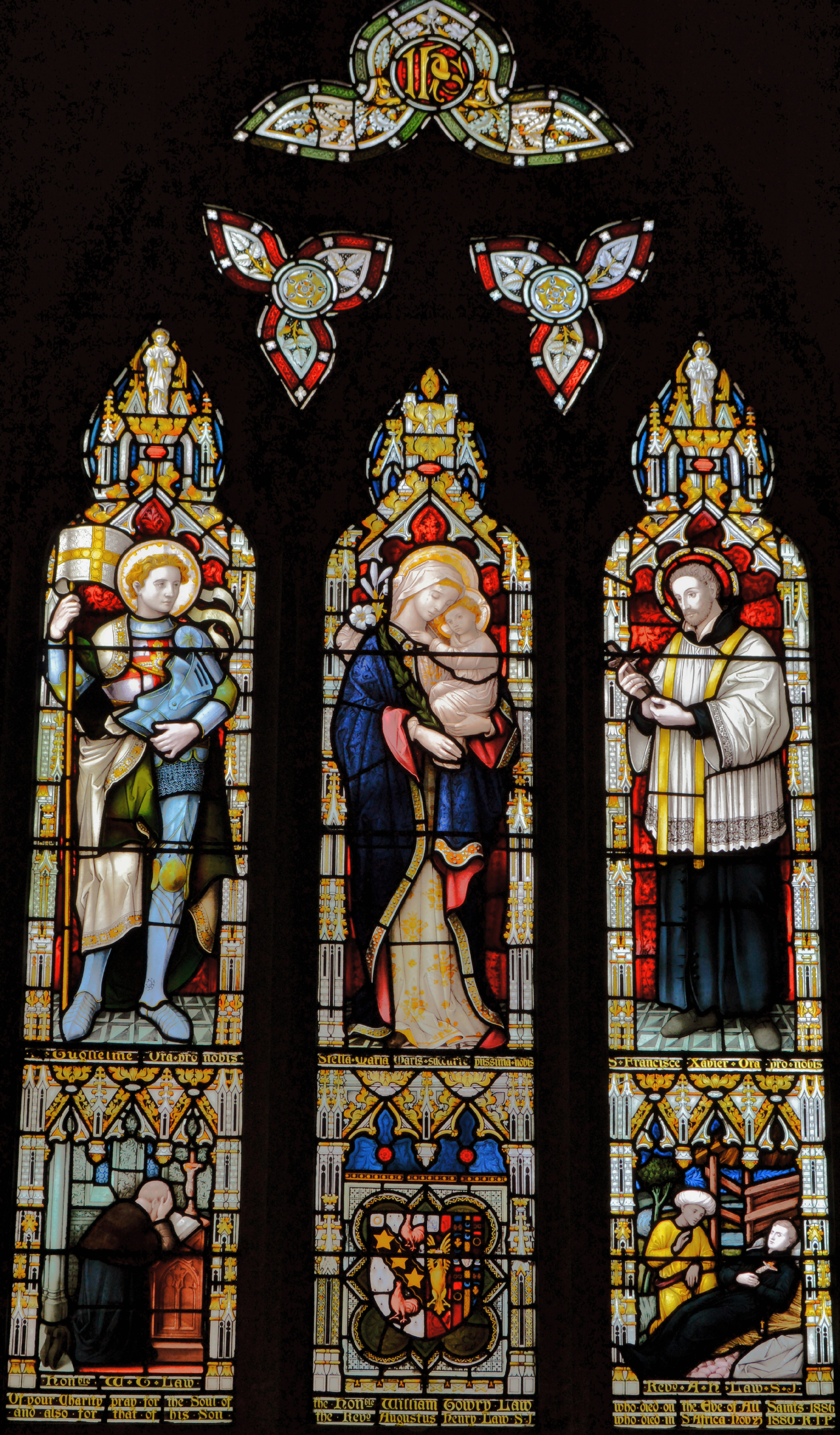
The Law memorial window

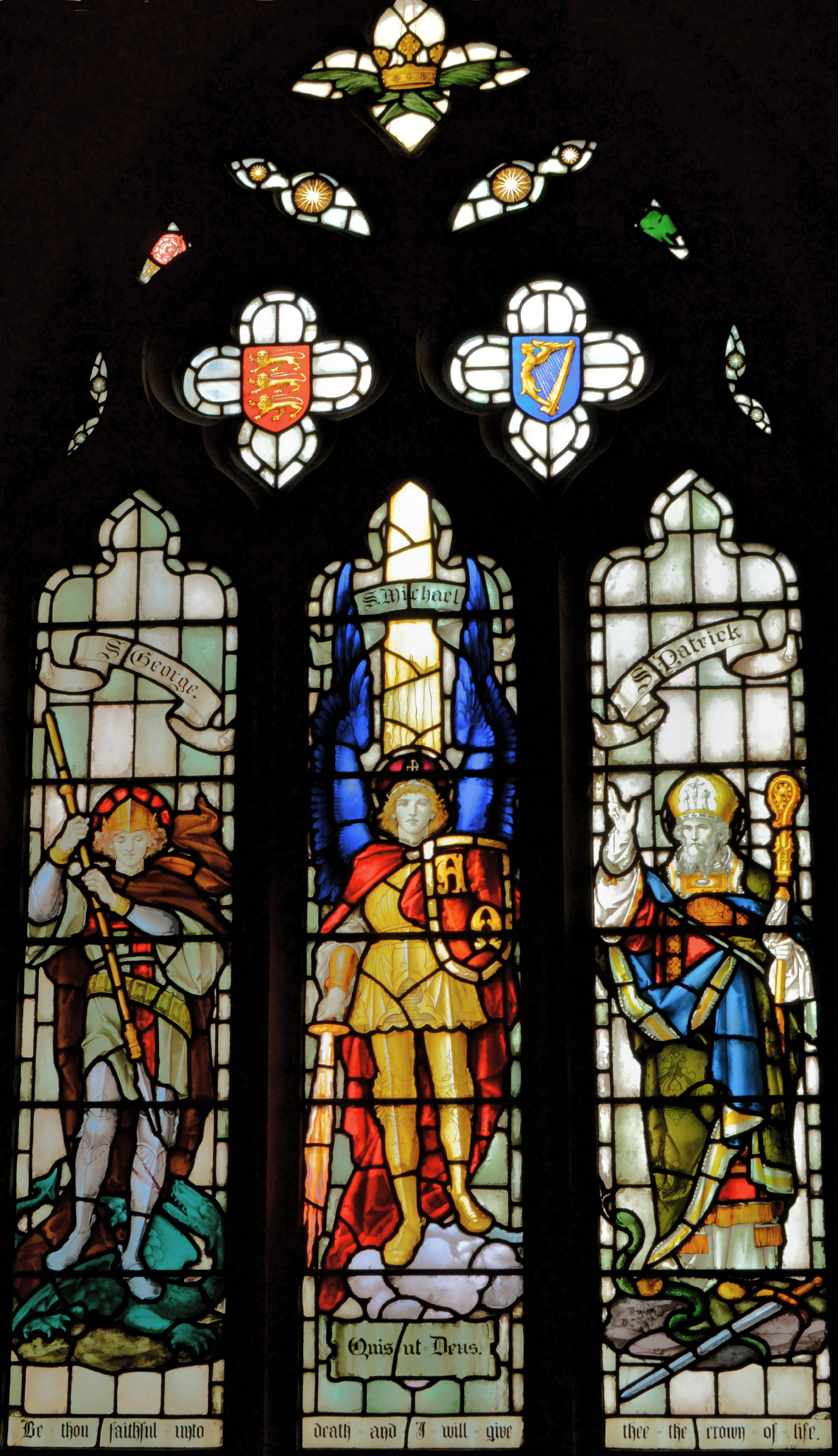
First World War memorial window

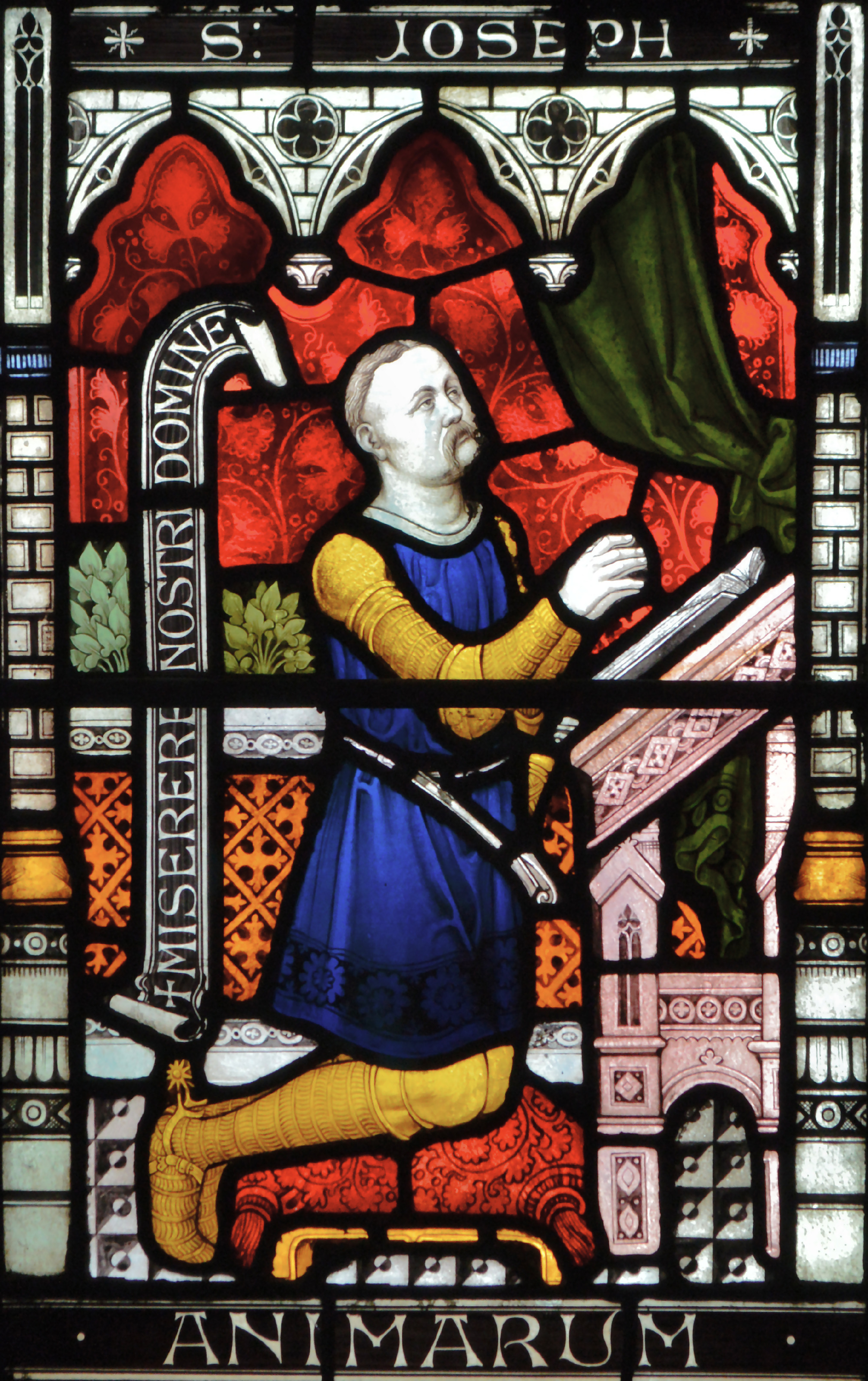
Window depicting Sir Richard Burton

== Burials ==
The first burial took place in 1853 but records for burials in the churchyard only survive from 1892. Frances Margaret Taylor (1832–1900), who was founder of the Roman Catholic religious congregation the Poor Servants of the Mother of God, was buried in the churchyard. Her remains were transferred in 1959 to the chapel at Maryfield Convent, Roehampton. Over 80 sisters of the order are buried in the churchyard.

- Burials at St Mary Magdalen

Other burials include:

- Mary Frances Ames (1853–1914), author and illustrator of children's books
- Arthur William à Beckett (1844–1909), English journalist and intellectual
- John Bernard Bagshawe (1827–1901), Catholic priest and author of The Threshold of the Catholic Church
- Winifred Barnes (1892–1935), actress and singer known for her roles in Edwardian musical comedy and operetta
- George Bellew-Bryan, 4th Baron Bellew (1857–1935), Irish peer who fought in the Second Anglo-Afghan War, the Nile Expedition and in the Second Boer War
- John Francis Bentley (1839–1902), the architect of Westminster Cathedral
- George Thomas Blount (1820–1899), for half a century president of the Society of Saint Vincent de Paul
- Walter Blount (1807–1894), a long-serving officer of arms at the College of Arms
- Katharine Harris Bradley (1846–1914) and her niece and ward Edith Emma Cooper (1862–1913), who together wrote about 40 works of poetry and verse drama and long journal Works and Days, using the pseudonym Michael Field; they were buried together in the churchyard. A now-lost marble tomb was erected in 1926.
- René le Brun, Comte de L'Hôpital (1877–1929), artist known for his illustrations for the eleventh edition (1911) of Encyclopædia Britannica
- Henry Clutton (1819–1893), architect and designer
- Charles Stanton Devas (1848–1906), political economist and author of The Key to the World's Progress (1906), an interpretation of Cardinal Newman’s teaching
- Sir Henry Moore Jackson GCMG (1849–1908), a British Army officer and colonial governor
- John J C Jones C. B.,C.V.O. (1839–1929), chief commissioner of the Metropolitan Police in Dublin
- Alexander Kerr (1838–1909), Scottish banker who was the first manager for the National Bank of New Zealand
- Ernest Law (1854–1930), historian and barrister
- Henry Owen Lewis (1842–1913), Irish Home Rule politician, MP for Carlow from 1874 to 1880
- Donald MacGregor (1839–1911), Scottish Liberal Party politician who, from 1892 to 1895, was a Member of Parliament for the Inverness-shire constituency
- May Probyn (1856–1909), fin de siècle poet, who published a novel in 1878, and became a Catholic convert in the following decade
- Fr Henry Augustus Rawes (1826–1885), Catholic hymn writer and preacher
- The artists Adrian Stokes (1854–1935) and his wife Marianne Stokes (1855–1927), who was considered one of the leading women artists in Victorian England
- Leonard Stokes (1858–1925), architect who designed many Roman Catholic buildings, including churches, convents and schools, as well as country houses and around 20 telephone exchanges. In 1919 he was awarded the Gold Medal of the Royal Institute of British Architects, having served as its president from 1910 to 1912.
- Leonard Stokes' brother Sir Frederick Wilfrid Stokes (1860–1927), an engineer and inventor in 1915 of the Stokes mortar, which saw extensive use in the latter half of the First World War

=== Sir Richard and Lady Burton ===
The cemetery includes a Grade II* listed tent-shaped mausoleum of Carrara marble and Forest of Dean stone, containing the tombs of the Victorian explorer Sir Richard Burton (1821–1890) and his wife, Isabel, Lady Burton (née Arundell; 1831–1896), who designed it; she also erected the memorial stained-glass window to Burton, which is next to the lady chapel in the church.

=== Comte de Vezlo Mausoleum ===
The cemetery includes another mausoleum, commemorating the very young Comte de Vezlo, Guilaume Henri (1894–1901). A plaque near the mausoleum's entrance also commemorates his mother, Annette Rosamonde Bosio, the Comtesse de Vezlo, who died in 1938. The architect is not known.

=== Sir James Marshall ===
Sir James Marshall (1829–1889), a British colonial judge who helped the spread of Roman Catholicism in Ghana and Nigeria, is buried in the churchyard cemetery. His wife Alice (née Young) died in 1926 and is also buried in the churchyard. A memorial plaque inside the church was unveiled on 11 August 1999, 100 years after his death.

The Knights and Ladies of Marshall, a lay association of Ghanaian Catholics, visit the church in Mortlake annually to celebrate a Mass in his memory.

=== War graves ===
The cemetery contains war graves of four service personnel of World War I and two of World War II.

== Gallery ==
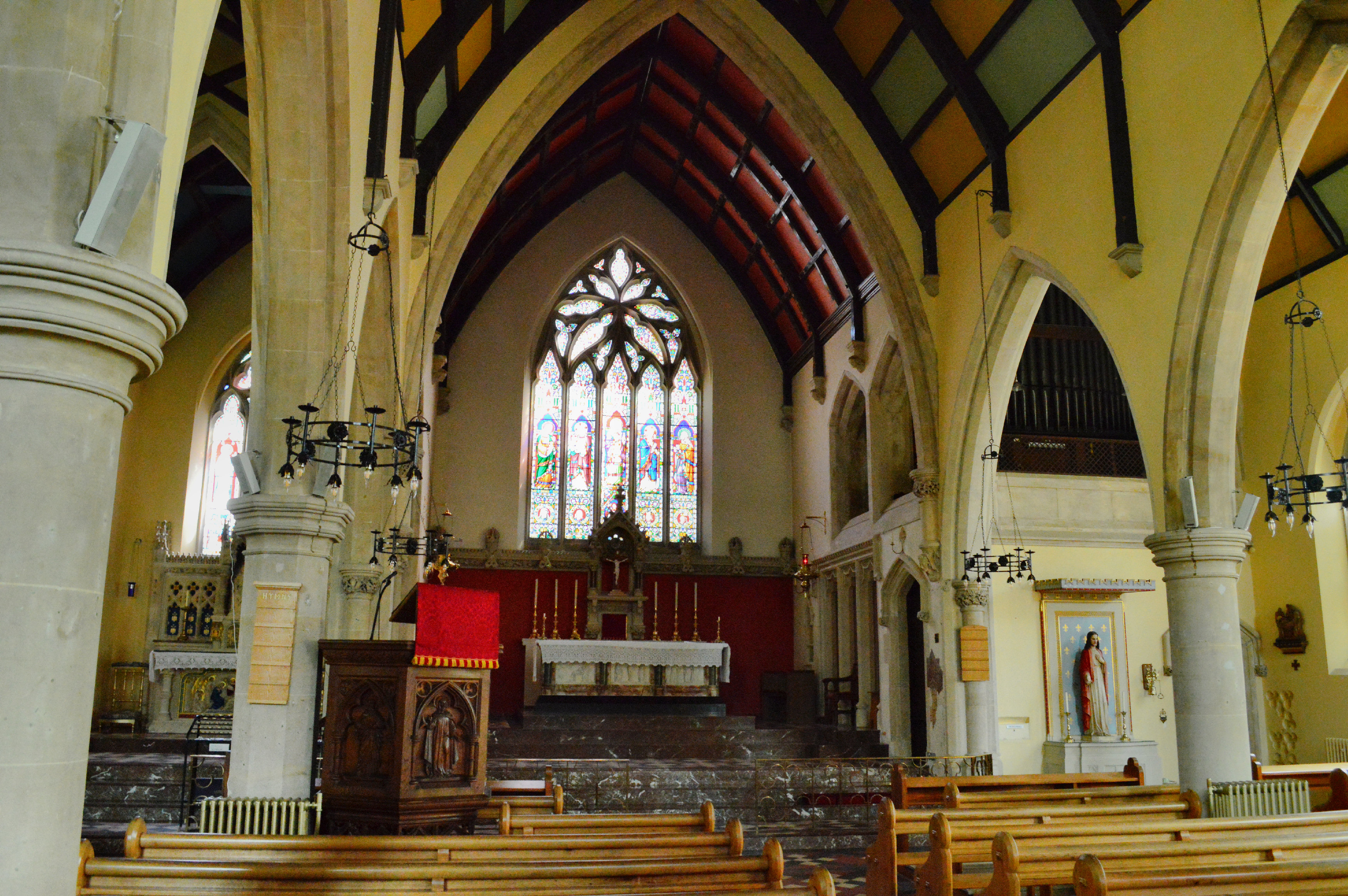
Interior

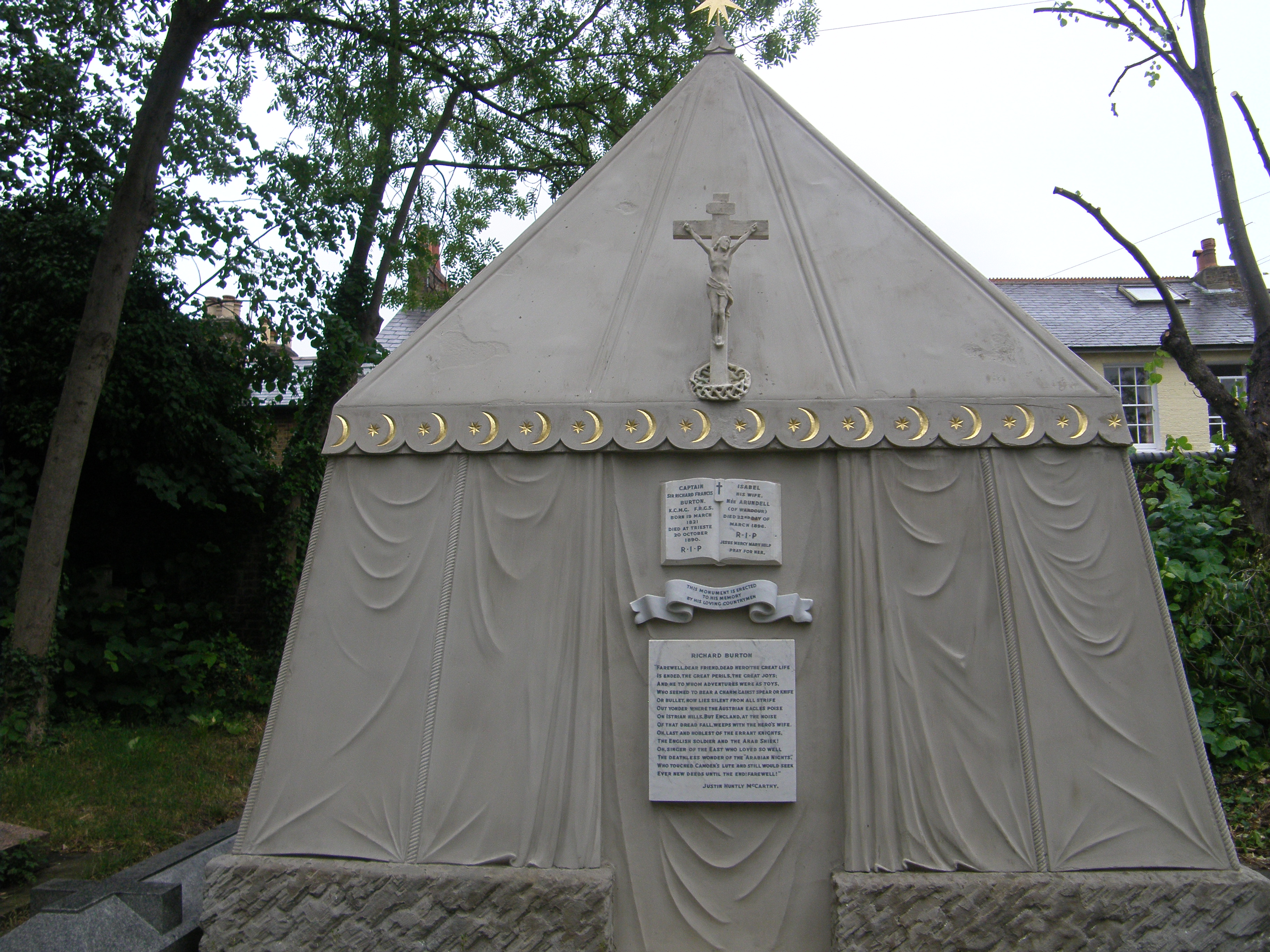
Mausoleum of Sir Richard and Lady Burton

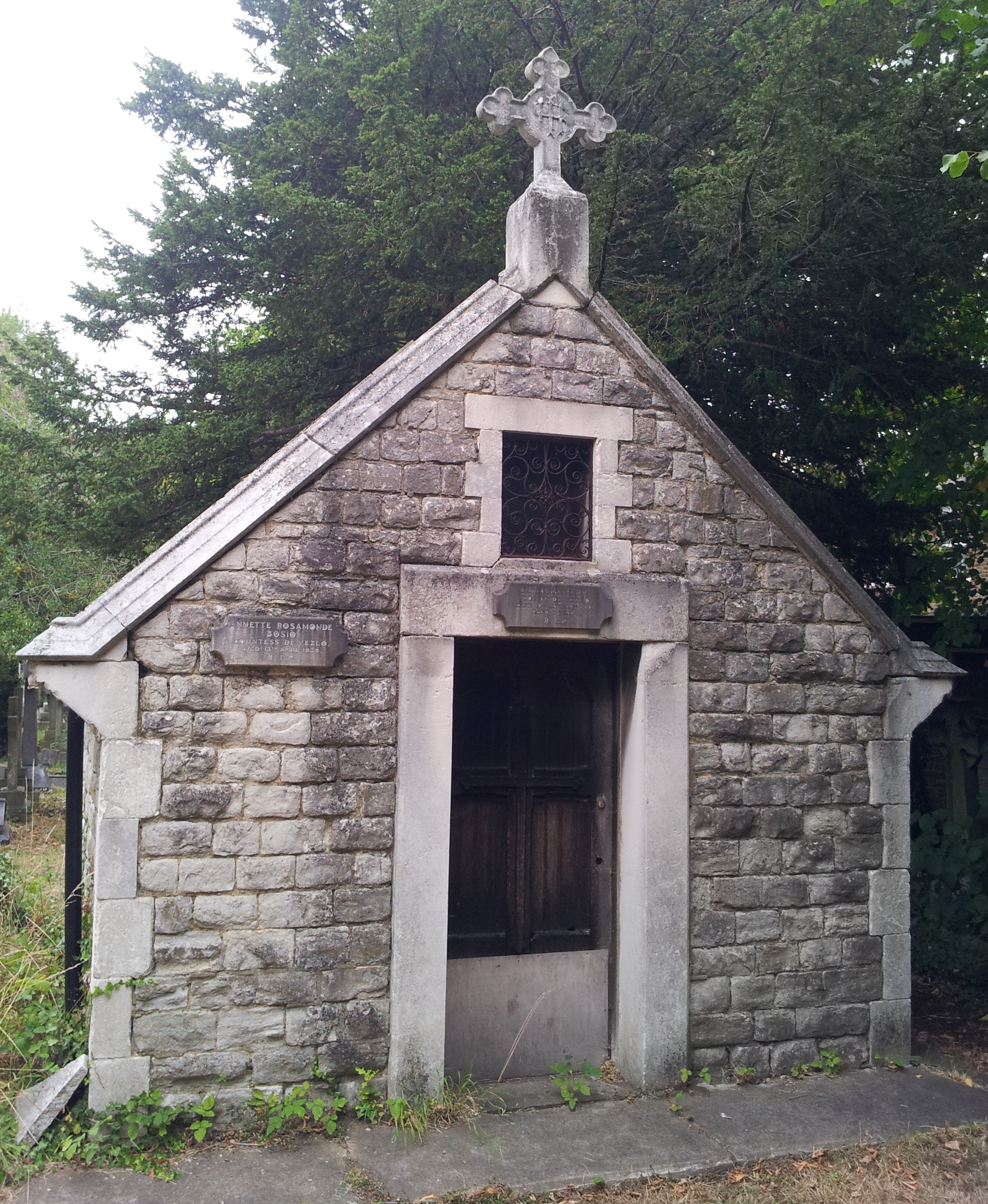
Comte de Vezlo Mausoleum

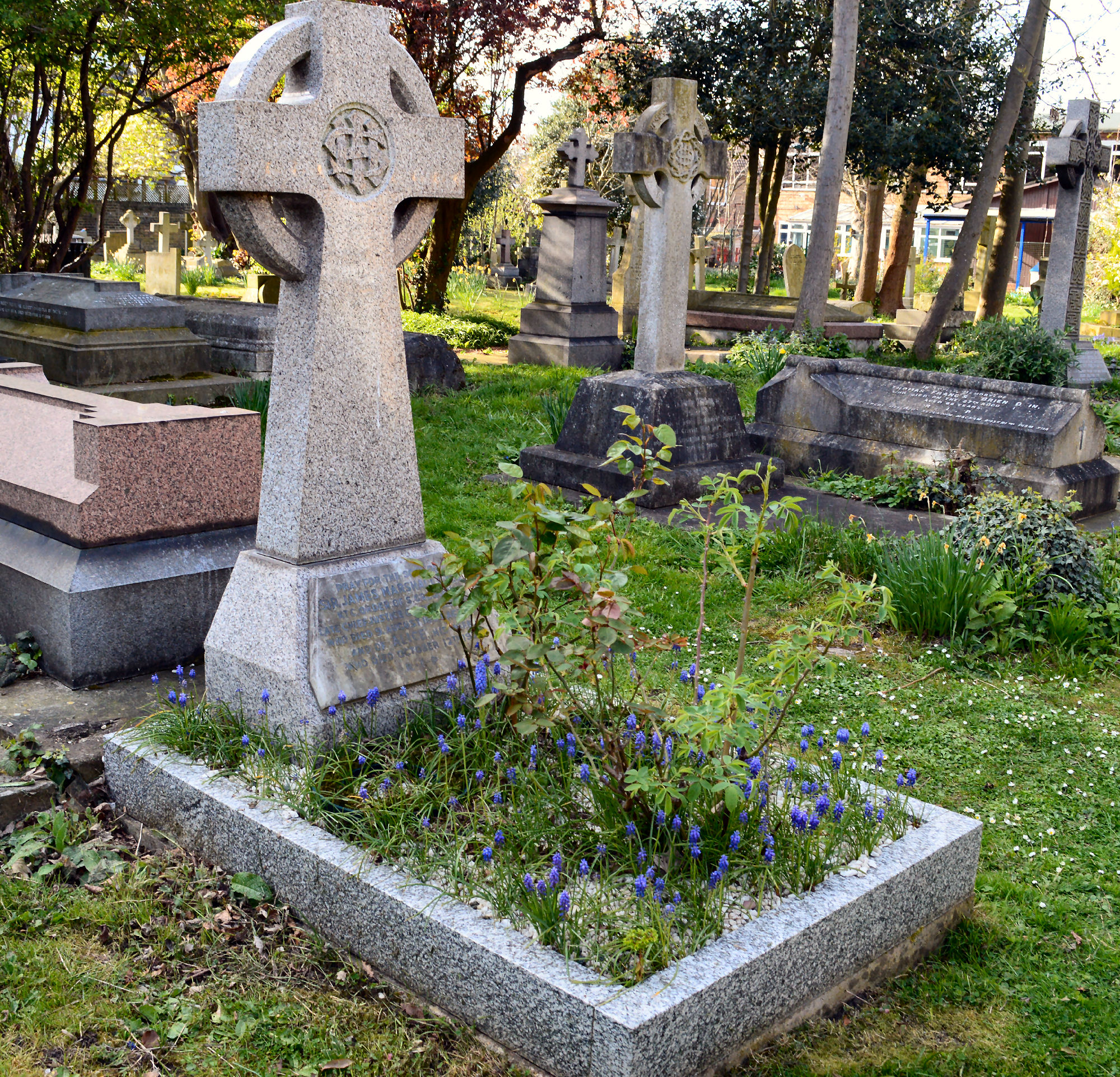
Grave of Sir James Marshall and his wife Alice

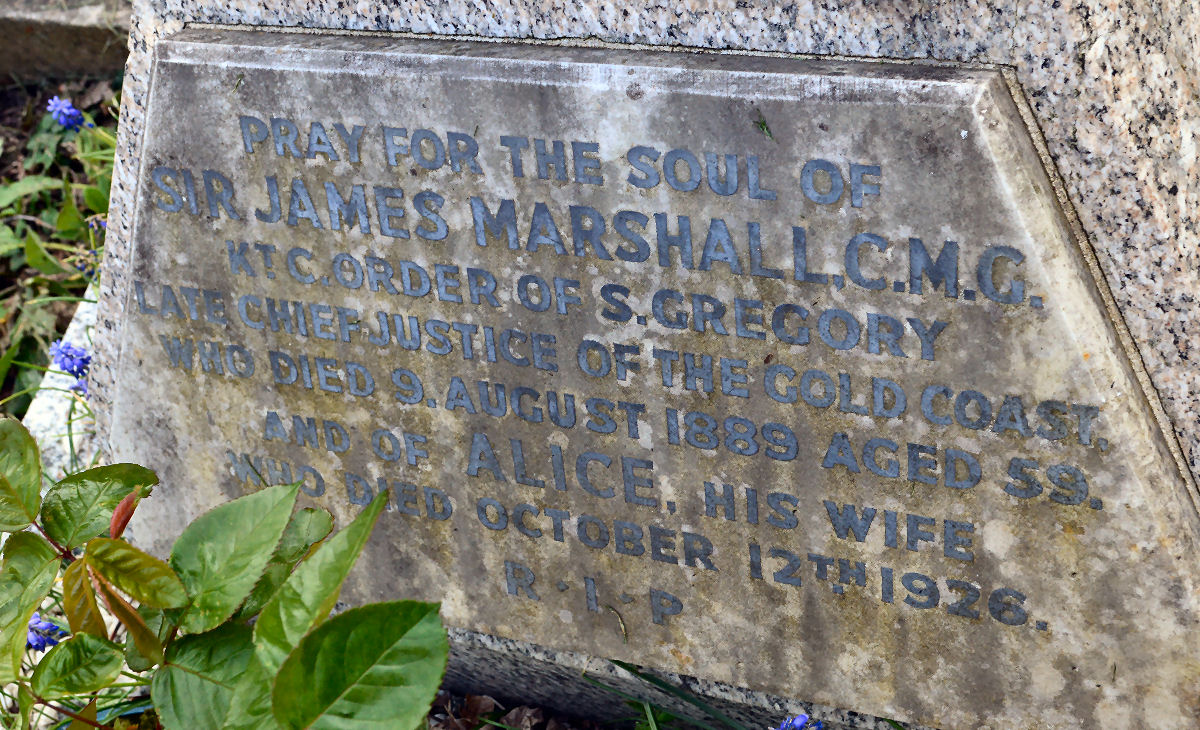
Grave of Sir James and Lady Alice Marshall: inscription

== See also ==
- St Mary the Virgin Mortlake
