= Church of Our Lady and St Catherine of Siena, Bow =

Roman Catholic church in London, England

Coordinates: 51.5287°N 0.01816°W

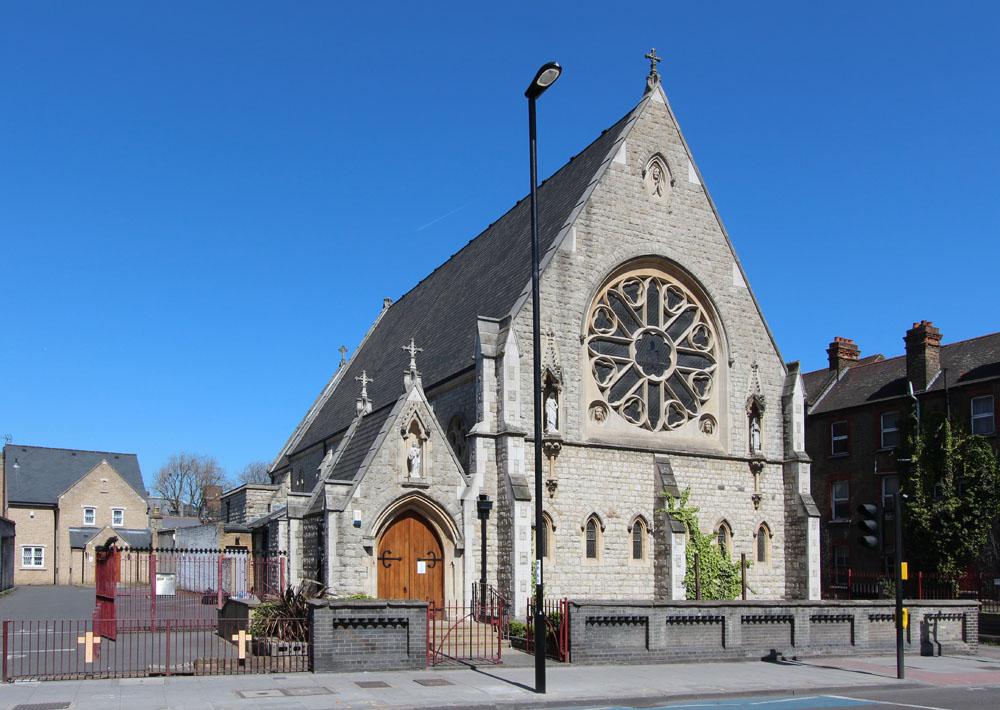
Our Lady & St Catherine of Siena, Bow, viewed in 2013

The Church of Our Lady and St Catherine of Siena is a Roman Catholic church dedicated to the Virgin Mary and Catherine of Siena at 179 Bow Road, E3 in Bow, east London. Designed by Gilbert Blount, it opened in 1870. Formerly the parish was run by a community of Dominican nuns, but it is now run by the Archdiocese of Westminster.

== See also ==
- Catholic Church in England
