= St Peter's Church, Gloucester =

Coordinates: 51.8674°N 2.2409°W

St Peter's Church
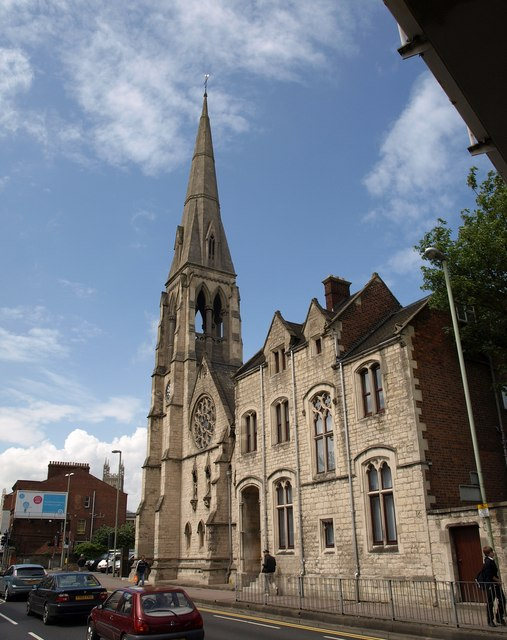

- Location within Gloucestershire Location within England
- Location: Gloucester
- Country: England
- Denomination: Roman Catholic
- Website: StPetersGloucester.org.uk

History
- Status: Parish church
- Dedication: Saint Peter

Architecture
- Functional status: Active
- Heritage designation: Grade II* listed
- Architect: Gilbert Blount
- Style: Gothic Revival
- Groundbreaking: 1860
- Completed: 8 October 1868

Administration
- Province: Birmingham
- Diocese: Clifton
- Deanery: St Wulstan

Listed Building – Grade II*
- Official name: Roman Catholic Church of St Peter
- Designated: 12 March 1973
- Reference no.: 1245721

St Peter's Church is a Roman Catholic Parish church in Gloucester, Gloucestershire. It was built from 1860 to 1868 and designed by Gilbert Blount. It is situated on the corner of London Road and Black Dog Way in the centre of the city. It is a Grade II* listed building.

== History ==
In 1788, a Roman Catholic mission was founded in Gloucester. It was served by an Fr Gildart from a house on Berkeley Street. He did so with help from a £1,000 donation from a Miss Mary Webb. In 1789, it became a parish. In 1790, a Fr John Greenaway came to serve the parish and getting the chapel built. It was dedicated to St Peter ad Vincula and was built on London Road. It was registered in 1792. He died in 1800 and was buried in the chapel.

In 1850, during the same year as the restoration of the English hierarchy, a Fr Leonard Calderbank became parish priest. With the increasing Catholic population of the city, he planned for a larger church to accommodate the congregation. In 1857, a £1,000 gift from a Frances Canning was given for the construction of the church and subscriptions were given by the local congregation.

The presbytery, designed by Alexander Scoles, was built in 1879–80.

== Architecture ==
In 1859, the chapel on the site of the church was demolished. Construction on the church started in 1860. Gilbert Blount was commissioned to build a Gothic Revival church. In 1867, the neighbouring presbytery was demolished to allow space for construction of a longer nave, a tower and spire. On 8 October 1868, the church was consecrated. In 1880, a new presbytery was built.

=== Interior ===
A triptych by Mayer of Munich, acquired by Canon Case in Paris. The stained glass is by Hardman & Co. and Clayton and Bell, who also did the original painting scheme in the sanctuary and Lady Chapel. The painted high altar and reredos in the sanctuary were designed by Blount, as was the carved and arcaded circular stone pulpit, a gift of Miss Canning. In the sanctuary are the carved figures of our Lady, St Joseph, St. Gregory, St. Augustine, St. David and St. Willstan.

== Parish ==
The church has four Sunday Masses: 6:00 pm on Saturday and 9:00 am, 10:00 am and 5:30 pm on Sunday.

== See also ==
- Roman Catholic Diocese of Clifton
