= Caverswall =

Village in Staffordshire, England

Coordinates: 52.98342°N 2.07443°W

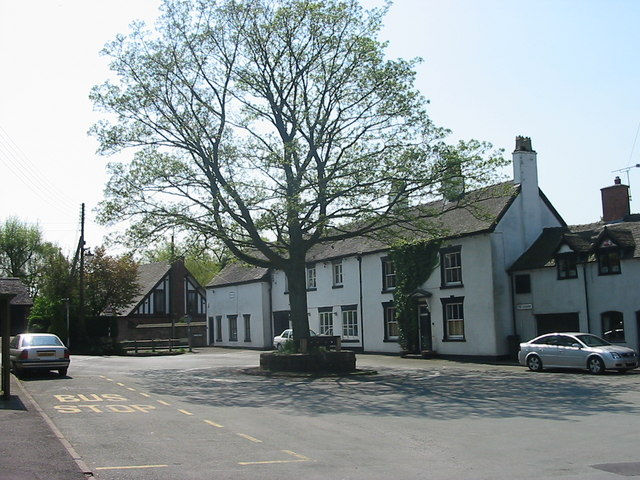
- Caverswall square

- Location within Staffordshire
- Population: 971 (2011 census)
- Civil parish: Caverswall
- District: Staffordshire Moorlands
- Shire county: Staffordshire
- Region: West Midlands
- Country: England
- Sovereign state: United Kingdom
- Post town: STOKE-ON-TRENT
- Postcode district: ST11
- Dialling code: 01782
- UK Parliament: Staffordshire Moorlands

Caverswall is a village and parish in Staffordshire, England, to the south west of Staffordshire Moorlands.

In the middle of the 19th century there were about 1500 inhabitants. In the 1880s an urbanised part of the parish called East Vale was transferred to Longton, which was then an expanding industrial town. The population of the civil parish at the 2011 census was 971.

On 1 April 1974 the civil parish was renamed from "Caverswall" to "Caverswall and Werrington", on 1 April 1988 the parish of "Caverswall and Werrington" was abolished and split into "Caverswall" and Werrington.

== Etymology ==
The name Caverswall is thought to have its origins in the Saxon words Cafhere, a personal noun, and Waelle, which meant spring or well. By the time of the Domesday Book the village was called Caureswelle.

== Around the village ==
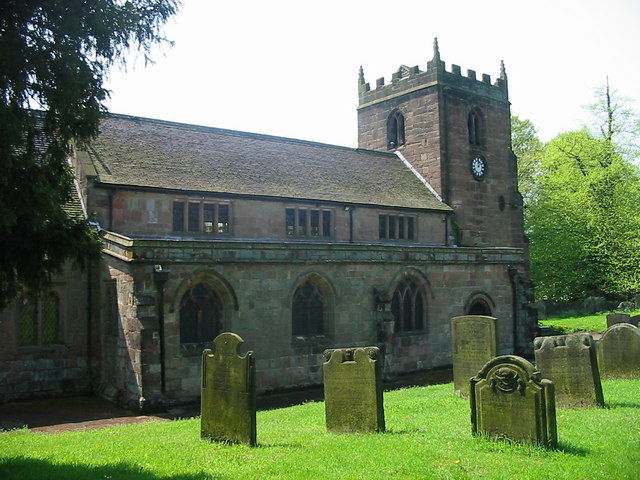
Church of St Peter

Near the village square are St Peter's Church of England Aided School, St. Peter's Church, St. Filumena's Catholic Church, St. Filumena's Primary School and a now disused Wesleyan Chapel. Also located on The Square is the Red House, a public house. In the middle of the square there is a large tree under which is a set of stocks.

Caverswall Castle may date from a Saxon manor house, but the fortifications date from a licence to crenellate (royal permission to fortify) granted in November 1275, although there may have been an earlier application in 1230. The castle remains were in-filled by a house in 1615, by Matthew Craddock from Stafford, and the former moat has been restored to encircle the castle. It is privately owned.

Foxfield Railway is based approximately half a mile away from the village and runs heritage Steam Traction along the former Branch line to Foxfield Colliery.

== Notable people ==
- Robert Williams Buchanan (1841–1901) a Scottish poet, novelist and dramatist; born locally.
- S. H. Burton (1919–2005), school teacher, college lecturer and prolific author of books about the West Country

== See also ==
- Listed buildings in Caverswall
