= Weston Coyney =

Suburb of Stoke-on-Trent, England

Coordinates: 52.9921°N 2.0986°W

- Location within Staffordshire
- Population: 5,073 (2011.Ward)
- OS grid reference: SJ934438
- Unitary authority: Stoke-on-Trent
- Ceremonial county: Staffordshire
- Region: West Midlands
- Country: England
- Sovereign state: United Kingdom
- Post town: STOKE-ON-TRENT
- Postcode district: ST3
- Dialling code: 01782
- Police: Staffordshire
- Fire: Staffordshire
- Ambulance: West Midlands
- UK Parliament: Stoke-on-Trent South

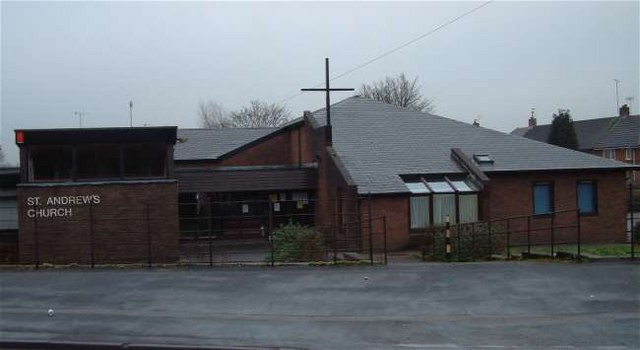
St. Andrew's Church in Weston Coney

Weston Coyney is a suburb of the City of Stoke-on-Trent in Staffordshire. It lies on the south eastern edge of the city and borders the neighbouring Staffordshire Moorlands district.

Originally developed around a crossroads, the area now also includes two major estates: Park Hall, developed in the 1970s, and Coalville, a 1950s estate built for the National Coal Board (NCB) to house many of its miners.

Weston Coyney is almost entirely a residential area with little industry and most of the residents work elsewhere in the city.

== History ==
Weston Coyney is identified in the Domesday Book as a manor called Westone or West Town in lands belonging to Robert de Stafford and held by Ernulf de Hesdin. The land was recorded as being mostly woodland but with enough arable land to require three ploughs. At some time during the 13th century, during the reign of Henry III the manor of Westone had passed to the Coyney family who held the manor for several hundred years.

In the 17th century the Coyneys built Weston Coyney Hall as the family residence and continued to live there until 1910. The hall was eventually demolished in 1944. Another major family, the Parkers, built Park Hall also during the 17th century. A relative of the family, Sir Thomas Parker, became Lord Macclesfield and was Lord Chancellor between 1718 and 1725 before being convicted of corruption. Park Hall was not as fortunate as Weston Coyney Hall and had to be rebuilt following a fire in 1793. The last known owners of Park Hall were Joseph and Anne Jackson. The hall became known as the Safari Club under the ownership of Joseph, Stanford and Spencer Jackson. The rebuilt hall survived until the late 1960s when it was demolished.

Apart from the two halls, the area remained mostly farmland until the 20th century when residential development started along Leek Road. Post war development saw much more housing built until Weston Coyney now merge into Meir without a break.

During the Second World War a Starfish site (an aerial bombing decoy site) was situated on Park Hall hills.

The exception to the rural land use was at the western side of Weston Coyney where coal deposits existed. Mining started in the 18th century and continued until the 1960s. The last coal mine was Park Hall colliery which closed in 1962 when incorporated with the nearby Florence Pit. The site is now occupied by an industrial estate called Cinderhill after the most visible reminder of the colliery. A considerable amount of gravel extraction took place between 1930 and 1970 in the area that now forms Park Hall Country Park.

== Governance ==
Weston Coyney is part of the Meir Hay North, Parkhall and Weston Coyney ward within Stoke City Council. As of May 2025 the ward has two councillors, Ross Irving and Craig Beardsmore, who both represent the Conservative Party. Coalville and parts of Weston Coyney were not part of Stoke-on-Trent when built but were part of Cheadle Rural District. In April 1965 the area was part of a local government adjustment (The Stoke-On-Trent Order 1964) which moved the area into the city.

== Economy ==
The area is almost entirely residential, with two small industrial estates on the edge of Longton. There is a small supermarket as well as other facilities based around New Kingsway.

=== Coalville ===
Coalville was an NCB housing estate that was subject of a regeneration scheme. Coalville was built in 1954 to provide cheap housing to attract more miners to work in the then thriving North Staffordshire coalfield. Over 400 homes were built in under a year, most being prefabricated off site. Designed with a life span of only 15 years, by the 1980s they were found to be unsellable as the reinforced concrete they were built of was disintegrating. Coupled with the closure of the local coal mines the estate entered a period of decline. Although about 150 homes were improved to make them more marketable, the rest continued to deteriorate and by the late 1990s the estate was collapsing into a state of near dereliction. A housing regeneration partnership was set up and with the aid of funding from the Housing Market Renewal Initiative the estate was transformed into a modern housing estate called Weston Heights over a period of 10 years from 2006 to 2016.

== Geography ==
Like much of North Staffordshire, the area lies over coal measures, but the north and east areas sit mostly on sandstone and gravel. It was this latter resource that was extensively quarried in the mid 20th century. Most of the area is at an elevation of approximately 200 metres (656 ft). There are no major watercourses but the River Blithe forms the eastern boundary of the area and of the city.

== Landmarks ==
The only national nature reserve in Stoke is Park Hall Country Park, and is part of Weston Coyney. Partly open heathland and partly redeveloped gravel quarry pits, an area of the park is a geological Site of Special Scientific Interest.

== Education ==
There are three schools within Weston Coyney: Weston Heights Infant School (for ages 3–7, formerly Weston Coyney Infant School), Weston Coyney Junior School (for ages 7–11) and Park Hall Primary School (for ages 3–11). Children of secondary school age attend one of the city's high schools, none of which are in Weston Coyney. Following the closure of Longton High School in 2010, the nearest secondary schools in the city boundaries are Discovery Academy and Ormiston Meridian Academy although the Staffordshire County Council controlled Moorside High School is closer than either Discovery Academy or Ormiston Meridian Academy.

== Religious sites ==
=== Church of England ===
Weston Coyney was traditionally in the parish of Caverswall in the Diocese of Lichfield and parishioners had to travel to St Peter's in Caverswall. In 1984 Weston Coyney got its own church with the opening of St Andrew's church. This now forms part of the United Benefice of Caverswall with Dilhorne, with St Peter's and All Saints church in Dilhorne.
