= Gilbert R. Blount =

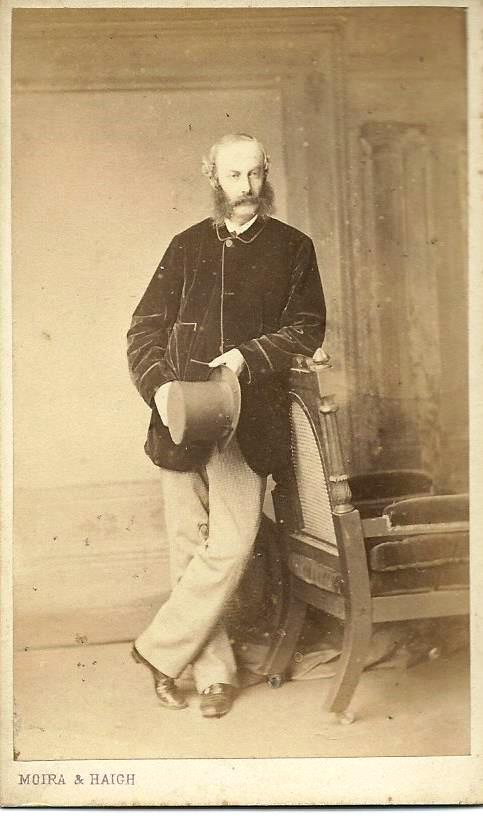
Gilbert Robert Blount

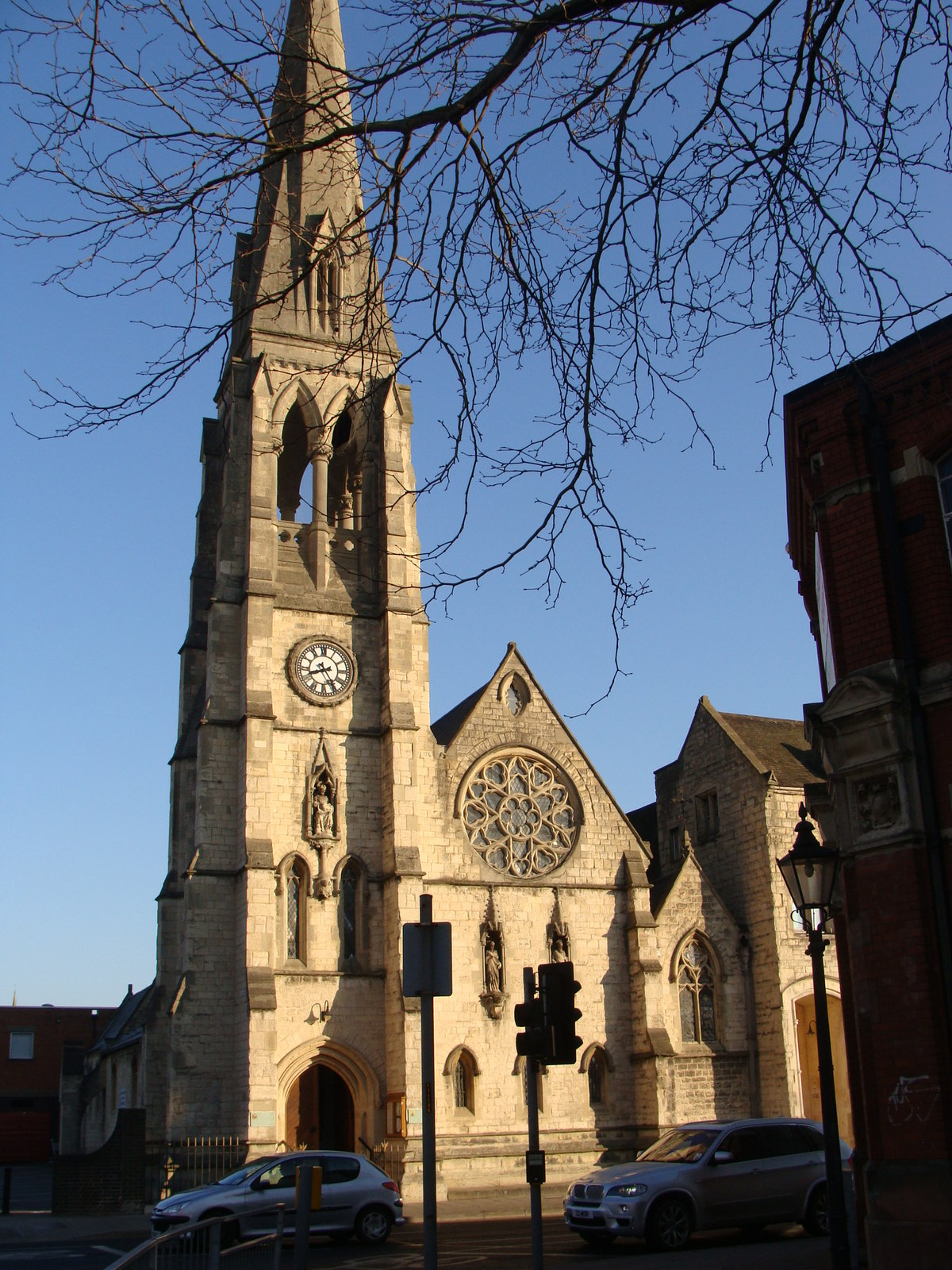
St Peter's Roman Catholic Church, Gloucester

Gilbert Robert Blount (1819–1876) was born at Mapledurham, near Reading, on 2 March 1819, the second child and son of Michael Joseph Blount and his wife Catherine (née Wright). Blount was educated at Downside in Somerset, (from September 1834 until December 1836), and he began his professional training as a civil engineer with Isambard Kingdom Brunel, working on the construction of the Thames Tunnel (Rotherhythe to Wapping). He was the Superintendent of Construction in 1841 and, during one of the many floods, narrowly escaped drowning.

He then decided that civil engineering was not for him and so, in 1842, he became apprenticed to architect Anthony Salvin (1799-1881) in November 1842, whose office at the time was situated at 32 Somerset Street, London. Many biographical dictionaries state that Blount trained in the office of Sidney Smirke (drawing on Blount's RIBA obituary) but this is not the case. By 1849, Blount had moved to 1 Montague Place where he worked independently for relatives and Catholic friends - including engagement as architect to Cardinal Wiseman, the Catholic Archbishop of Westminster.

With a resurgence of Catholic church building in England, he worked on new churches throughout England and was greatly influenced by Pugin.

St Peter's Church, Gloucester is one Blount's most notable churches and dates from the middle part of his career. Built on the site of a 1790 chapel dedicated to St Peter ad Vincula, Blount designed it in the Decorated Gothic style. Construction started in 1860. In 1867, the tower, spire, and baptistery were added; also designed by Blount. The church was consecrated on 8 October 1868.

He was married to Sophia Margaret Blount and died 13 November 1876 at his home, 1 Montagu Place, Montagu Square, London. He was buried in the family vault at St James’ Church in Reading.

== Works ==
- St Mary Magdalen Roman Catholic Church, Mortlake, London (1852)
- St Ambrose Church, Kidderminster, Worcestershire (1858)
- St Peter's Church, Bromsgrove, Worcestershire (1858)
- St Peter's Church, Gloucester, Gloucestershire (1859–60, 1867–88)
- St Mary Magdalen's Church, Brighton, Sussex (1861–62)
- St Filumena's Church, Caverswall, Staffordshire (1864)
- St Mary and St John's church, Newton-le-Willows, Lancashire (1864)
- St Anthony and St George's Church, Duncton, Sussex (1866)
- Our Lady Chapel, Swynnerton, Staffordshire (1868)
- Our Lady and St Catherine of Siena Church, London (1869–70)
- Church of Our Lady and St Catherine of Siena, Bow (1870)
- St Mary's Church, Husbands Bosworth, Leicestershire (1873–74)
- Church of the Holy Child and St Joseph, Bedford, Bedfordshire (1874)
