= Caverswall Castle =

English mansion

- Caverswall, Staffordshire, England
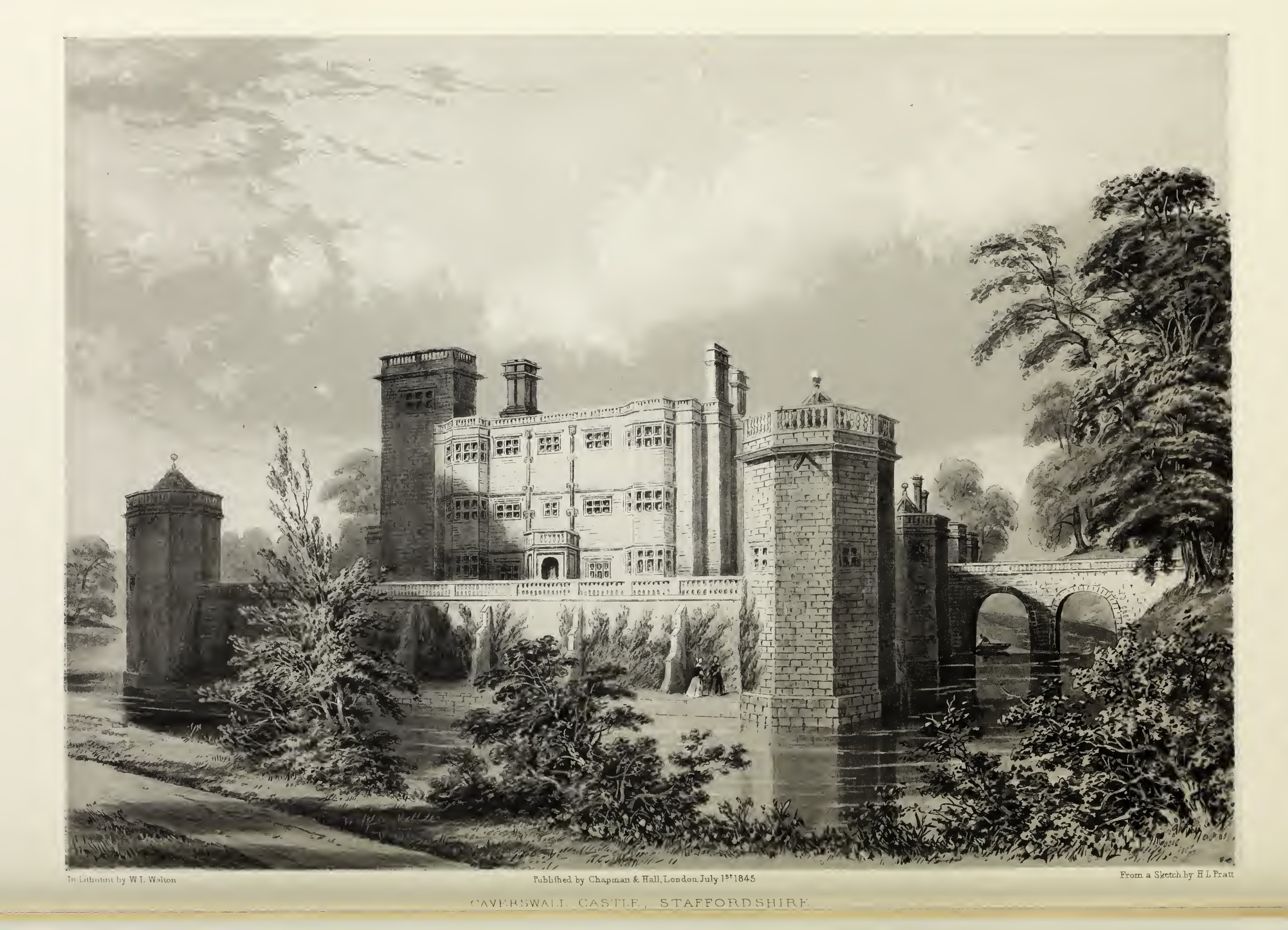
- Caverswall Castle, 1845

Site information
- Type: Mansion, built within older castle
- Owner: Private ownership
- Condition: requires substantial renovation

Location
- Shown within Staffordshire, England
- Location within Staffordshire
- Coordinates: 52.9825°N 2.0759°W
- Grid reference: grid reference SJ950428

Site history
- Materials: Stone

Caverswall Castle is a privately owned early-17th-century English mansion built in a castellar style upon the foundations and within the walls of a 13th-century castle, in Caverswall, Staffordshire. It is a Grade I listed building. The castle is large, with a floor area of 2,030 square yards (1,700 m^{2}).

== History ==
In ancient times, the manor of Caverswall was held by the eponymous Caverswall family, who in 1275 were granted licence to crenellate their manor house. The resulting medieval moated castle was approximately rectangular in plan with four angle towers and a keep within the curtain walls.

In the 15th century the castle, which was owned by the Caverswall family, became the seat of the Montgomery family, three of whom served as High Sheriff of Staffordshire. It was much decayed and neglected by the end of the 16th century.

It was rebuilt in the 17th century after being purchased in 1615 by Matthew Cradock of Stafford, a local wool merchant, first mayor of Stafford in 1614 and Member of Parliament for Stafford in 1621. He built the present mansion house to a design, it is said, of Robert Smythson or John Smythson. The three storey house has five bays each with stone mullioned and transomed windows. There is a castellated parapet and an entrance porch The old castle walls were retained and during the English Civil War it was garrisoned by parliamentary forces.

When the Cradock male line failed the estate was sold in 1655 to William Joliffe (High Sheriff of Staffordshire for 1663) but the eventual heir William Vane, 2nd Viscount Vane, was forced to sell it. Thereafter the castle had several owners. In 1811 it was occupied as a nunnery by a Benedictine order who sold it in 1853 to Sir Perceval Radcliffe, when they then relocated to Oulton Abbey. In the 1880s it was rented by the Wedgwood family. In 1891 it was purchased by W.E. Bowers who carried out extensive renovations and much improved the property. W.A. Bowers then sold it in 1933 to the Sisters of the Holy Ghost, who in turn sold it in 1965 to another convent, the Daughters of the House of Mary. When they left in 1977 the Castle was sold in various lots.

More recently the castle was bought in 2006 by property tycoon Robin MacDonald for £1.7 million who spent £1 million renovating it. Since the late 1970s, numerous planning applications for various commercial uses have been submitted, but they have all been refused.

The owner was prosecuted for allowing some holiday letting use in 2013 and fined £17,000 and ordered to pay £100,000 costs. The castle has several enforcement notices preventing various uses including "events, activity days, parties, photography & romantic breaks". The local authority have refused to remove the enforcement notices on several occasions. In February 2015 the property was offered for sale with Sotheby's for £3 million. In 2017 the owner talked about the issues he had faced from locals and the planning department:

In 2016, the Castle was put up for sale with Leading Estates for £5 million. The castle has been for sale since September 2019. In October 2020, the planning department refused two applications for commercial uses. The first refuses use as a small scale hotel. The second refuses photography and groups, such as schools or historic interest groups from visiting. The enforcement notices were kept in place prohibiting the owner from having any visitors, activities and guests including having a party or an event in the Castle or grounds

The castle was sold in April 2021 for an undisclosed amount.

== See also ==
- Castles in Great Britain and Ireland
- List of castles in England
- Grade I listed buildings in Staffordshire
- Listed buildings in Caverswall
