= List of churches in London =

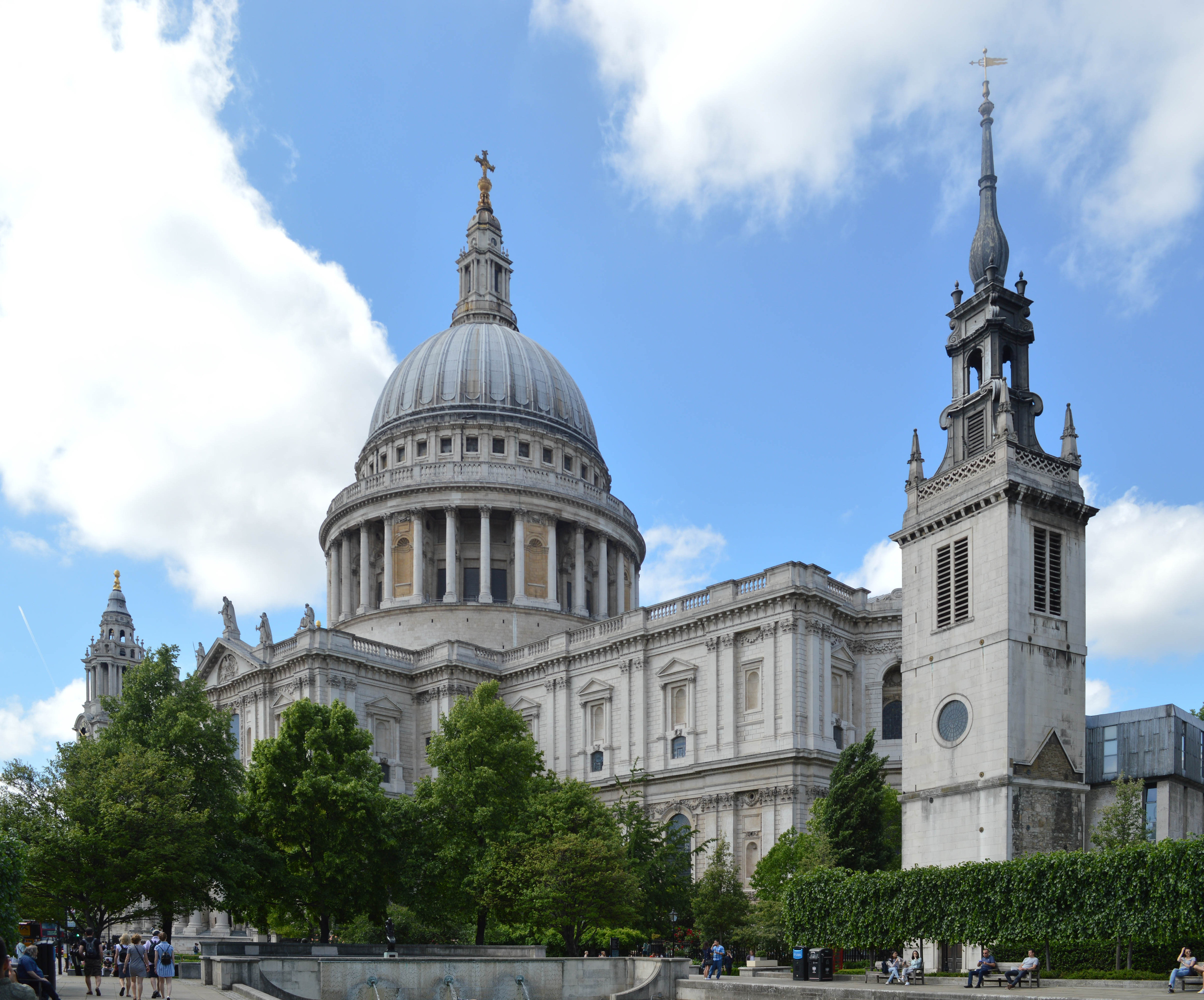
St Paul's Cathedral

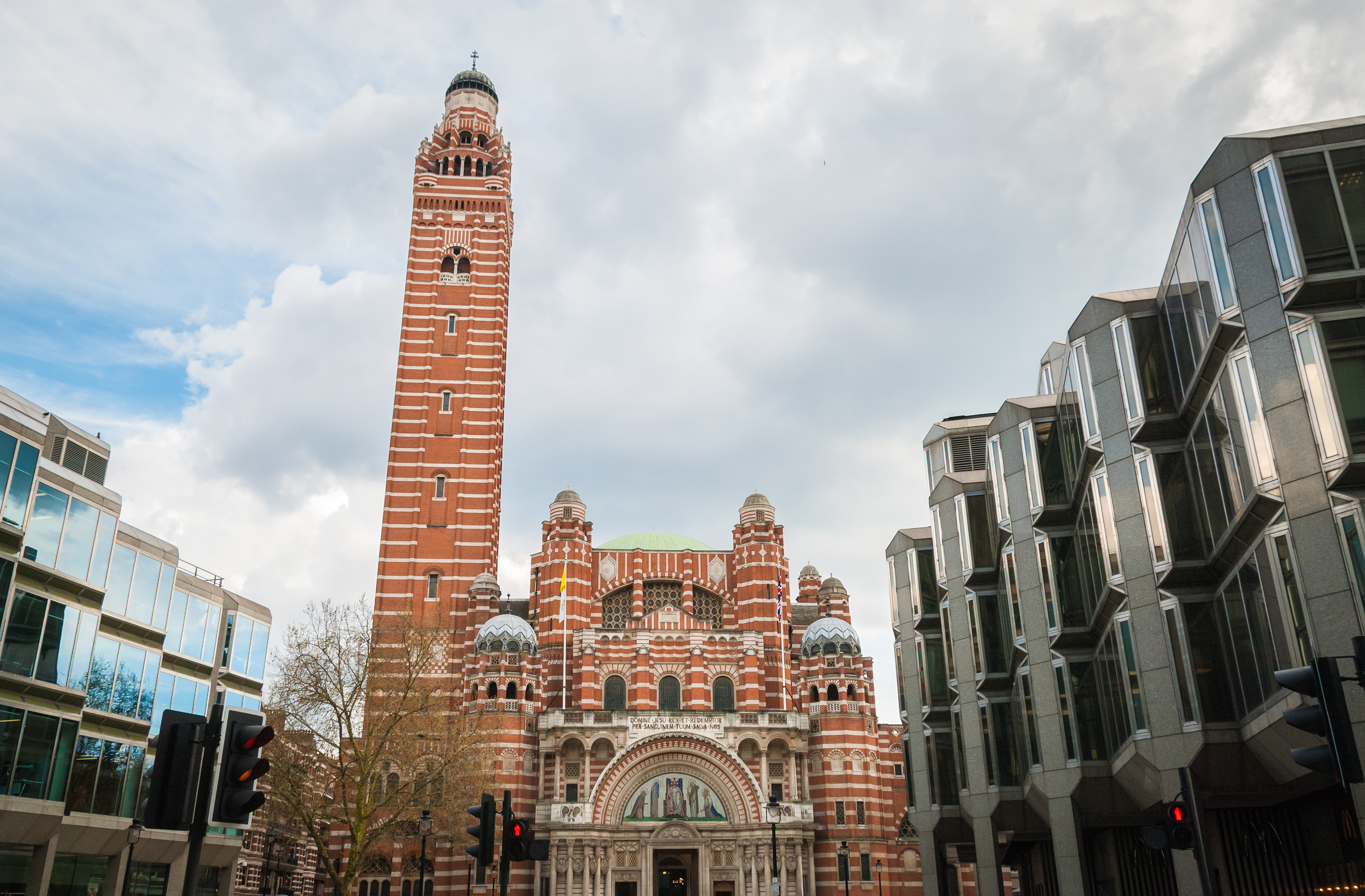
Westminster Cathedral

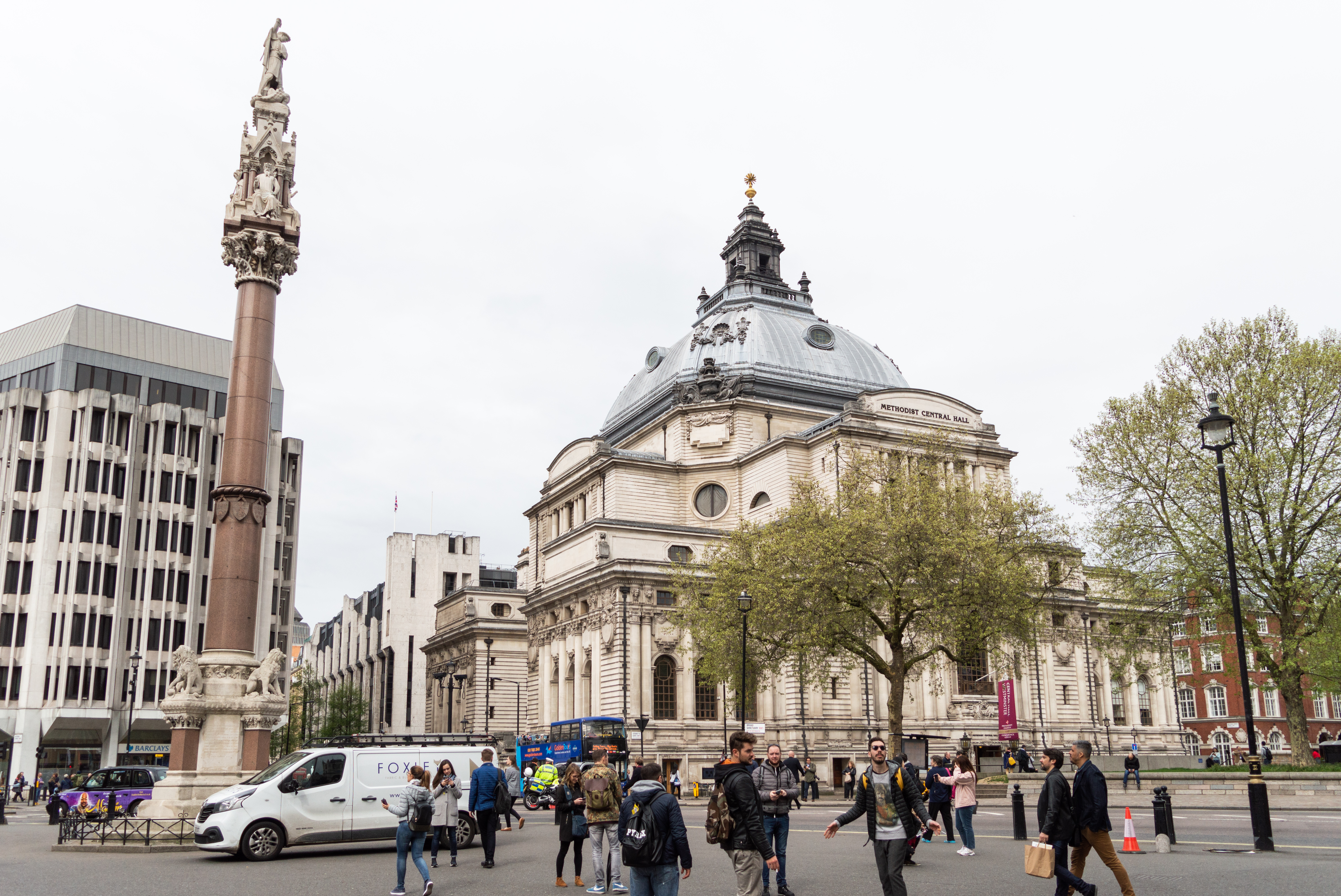
Methodist Central Hall Westminster is a Methodist church and conference centre

This is a list of cathedrals, churches and chapels in Greater London, England, which is divided into 32 London boroughs and the City of London. The list focuses on the more permanent churches and buildings which identify themselves as places of Christian worship. The denominations appended are those by which they self-identify.

== History ==
=== Wren and Anglican churches ===
Before the Great Fire of London in 1666, the City of London had around 100 churches in an area of only one square mile (2.6 km^{2}). Of the 86 destroyed by the Fire, 51 were rebuilt along with St Paul's Cathedral. The majority have traditionally been regarded as the work of Sir Christopher Wren, but although their rebuilding was entrusted primarily to him, the role of his various associates, including Robert Hooke and Nicholas Hawksmoor especially, is currently being reassessed and given greater emphasis.

With regard to Anglican churches, as opposed to Catholic churches, nonconformist chapels or meeting houses, the designs of the Wren office provided a new standard for British church architecture ever since, as well as giving a distinctive face to the Anglican church in London. Wren also designed a number of Anglican churches outside the City, including St James's, Piccadilly and St Clement Danes. After the Wren era, Hawksmoor was responsible for six of the great Anglican churches in the East End of London (for example Christ Church, Spitalfields), and other architects such as Hooke, James Gibbs and John James contributed significantly to Anglican church architecture in London.

=== Metropolitan area ===
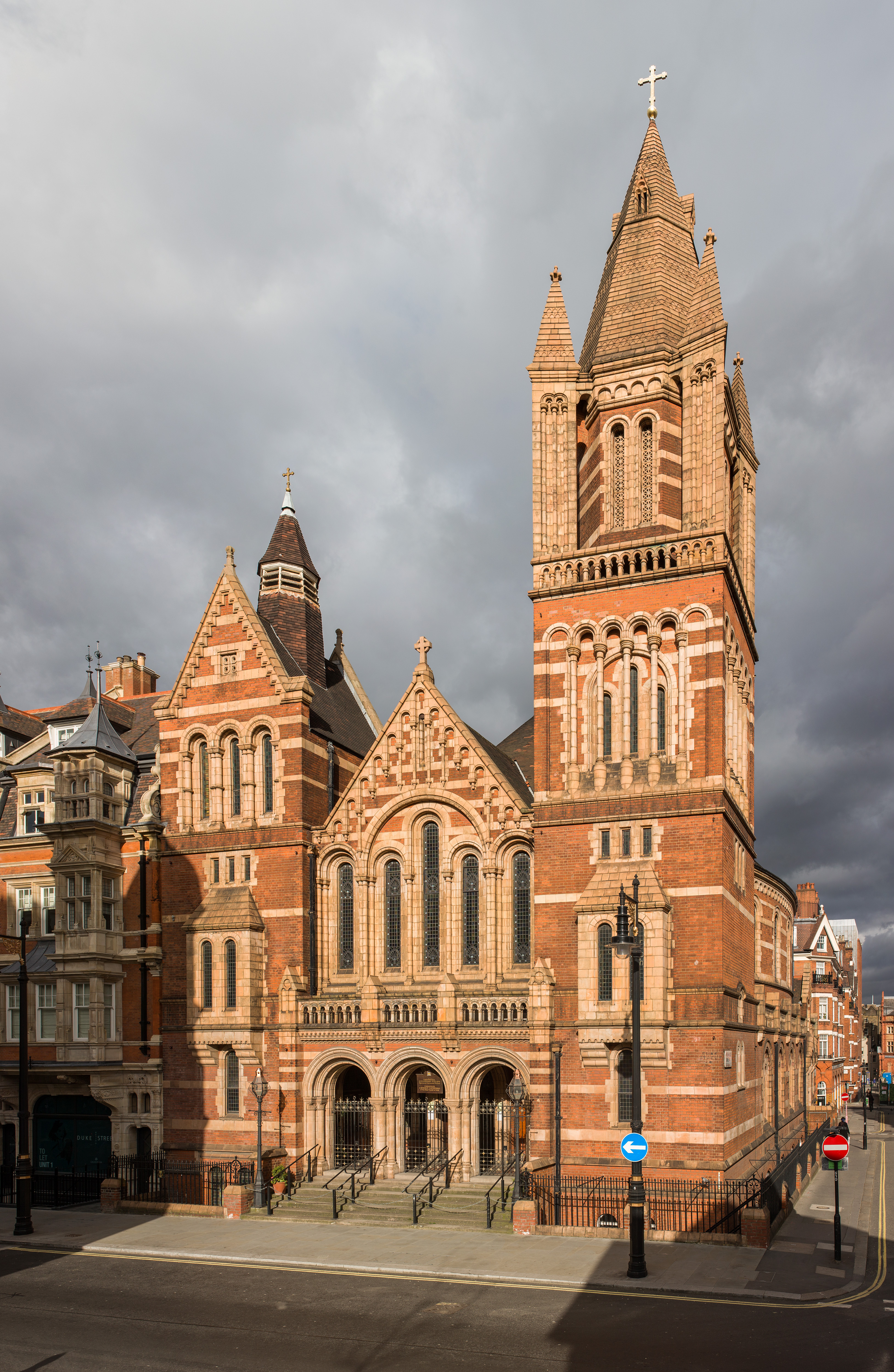
The King's Weigh House building on Duke Street, Mayfair (designed by Alfred Waterhouse and an example of nonconformist church architecture) today serves as the Ukrainian Catholic Cathedral of the Holy Family in Exile.

London's churches and chapels are numerous and diverse. Anglican and nonconformist churches and chapels are most numerous, but there are also many Catholic churches as well as places of worship for non-Christian religions.

Most of the Anglican churches lie within the Anglican dioceses of London to the north and Southwark to the south. For historical reasons, the Anglican churches in London north of the Thames but east of the River Lea fall within the Diocese of Chelmsford, and those in the London Boroughs of Bexley and Bromley fall within the Diocese of Rochester. A few Anglican churches in the Barnet area fall into the Diocese of St Albans, reflecting the historical association of Barnet with Hertfordshire. The Catholic dioceses that cover Greater London are, north of the Thames and west of the Lea, the Diocese of Westminster; south of the Thames the Archdiocese of Southwark; and north of the Thames and east of the Lea, the Diocese of Brentwood. There are still some two thousand Anglican churches alone, across the capital and if nonconformist and other denominations are included, they cover every age and style, in the design and evolution of which at least six hundred different architects have made contributions. As London expanded during the early 19th century, many new churches and chapels were built independently by the growing nonconformist urban population; to match the growth in nonconformist churches and chapels, the Anglican "Waterloo church" building programme saw numerous Anglican churches constructed across south London in the first half of the century.

=== Significance ===
Although many churches and chapels were entirely or partly lost to 19th-century demolitions and to bombing in the Second World War, many historic, architecturally significant and religiously significant buildings remain, particularly in the City of London and the neighbouring City of Westminster. A number of the churches are mentioned in the nursery rhyme Oranges and Lemons. Churches in this list belong to various denominations, as indicated.

== Map of medieval parish churches ==
This map shows the medieval churches of Greater London. The hundred or so medieval churches in the City of London are shown in a separate map in the City section.

Medieval parish churches in London

== London boroughs ==
=== Barking and Dagenham ===
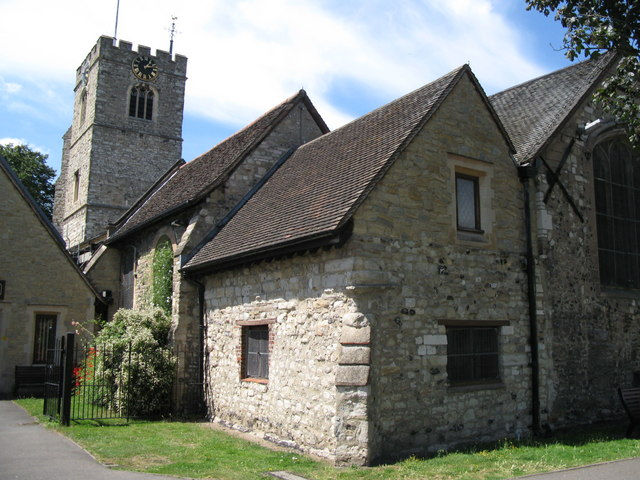
St Margaret's Church, Barking

Church name	Location	Dedication	Web	Founded	Denomination	Notes
St Margaret of Antioch, Barking	Barking	Margaret the Virgin		C13th	Anglican	Originated as part of Barking Abbey
SS Peter & Paul, Dagenham	Dagenham	Peter & Paul		C13th	Anglican	Rebuilt 1805. Receives alternative episcopal oversight from the Bishop of Maidstone
St Chad, Chadwell Heath	Chadwell Heath	Chad of Mercia		1884–1886	Anglican	Daughter church to Dagenham until 1895
St Thomas, Becontree	Becontree	Thomas		1922	Anglican	Building 1926–1927
St Patrick, Barking	Barking	Patrick		1924	Anglican	Rebuilt 1940; previously Church of the Ascension
St Martin, Becontree	Dagenham	Martin of Tours		1925	Anglican	Building 1931–1932. Parish of Becontree South
St Mary, Becontree	Becontree	Mary		1927	Anglican	Building 1935
St George, Dagenham	Becontree	George		1929	Anglican	Building 1935. Member of Reform and AMiE
St Elisabeth, Becontree	Becontree	Elizabeth		1932	Anglican	
St Alban, Becontree	Becontree	Alban		1932–1933	Anglican	Parish of Becontree South
St Cedd, Becontree	Becontree	Cedd		1933	Anglican	Rebuilt 1963. Nearby St Peter's redundant 1997
St Erkenwald, Barking	Barking	Earconwald		1934	Anglican	Rebuilt 1954
St John the Divine, Becontree	Becontree	John the Evangelist		1935	Anglican	Parish of Becontree South
St Mark, Mark's Gate	Mark's Gate	Mark		1956	Anglican	Rebuilt 2016
Christ Church, Thames View	Thames View	Jesus		1958–1959	Anglican	
Hartley Brook Church	Dagenham				Anglican	United with St Mary's Becontree
SS Mary & Ethelburga, Barking	Barking	Mary & Æthelburh		1858	Roman Catholic	Building 1869
St Vincent, Becontree	Becontree	Vincent?		1923	Roman Catholic	
St Peter, Dagenham	Dagenham	Peter		1926	Roman Catholic	Building 1937. Served by Missionaries of Our Lady of La Salette
Holy Family, Dagenham	Dagenham	Holy Family		1931	Roman Catholic	Building 1934
St Thomas More, Barking	Barking	Thomas More		1935	Roman Catholic	Served by Pallottines
St Anne, Becontree	Becontree	Anne		1937	Roman Catholic	Rebuilt 1960. Served from St Thomas More, Barking
Marks Gate Baptist Church	Mark's Gate				Baptist	
Barking Baptist Church	Barking				Baptist	
Becontree Avenue Baptist Church	Becontree			1929	Baptist Union	New building 1964
Dagenham Baptist Church	Dagenham			1927	Baptist	
Oxlow Lane Baptist Church	Dagenham				Baptist Union	
Upney Baptist Church	Barking			1935	Baptist	
Wood Lane Baptist Church	Becontree			1932	Baptist	
Barking Methodist Church	Barking				Methodist	Barking, Dagenham & Ilford Circuit
Beacontree Heath Methodist Church	Becontree				Methodist	Barking, Dagenham & Ilford Circuit
Old Dagenham Methodist Church	Dagenham				Methodist	Barking, Dagenham & Ilford Circuit
Barking Riverside Salvation Army	Barking				Salvation Army	
Dagenham Congregational Church	Dagenham				EFCC	
Osborne Square Church	Becontree				EFCC-FIEC	
Becontree Church	Becontree			2014	Co-Mission / AMiE	
Elim Christian Centre	Barking				Elim	
Bethel – London's Riverside Church	Dagenham	Bethel			Assemblies of God	
Rehoboth Tamil Church of God	Dagenham	Rehoboth			Church of God	Tamil. Joined Church of God 2015
RCCG Rivers of Joy	Becontree				RCCG	Meets in St John the Divine, Becontree
RCCG Living Faith Connections	Barking			2000	RCCG	Planted from RCCG Royal Connections
Potter's House Christian Fellowship Ch.	Barking				Potter's House	
Christ Apostolic Church Kingdom Builders	Becontree				Christ Apostolic	
COPUK Dagenham Central Assembly	Dagenham				Church of Pentecost UK	
Tree of Life Dagenham	Becontree				Tree of Life Network	
Cornerstone Fountain Church	Barking					
Victorious Pentecostal Assembly Barking	Barking			2000s		
Power House International Ministries	Dagenham			1996		
Kingsley Hall Church	Dagenham			1929		
Glorious Ministries International	Barking			2005		
Harmony Christian Centre	Dagenham			1997		Current building 2008. Has planted into Harold Wood
LifeLine Church	Dagenham			1970s		
King's Church Barking	Barking					

=== Barnet ===
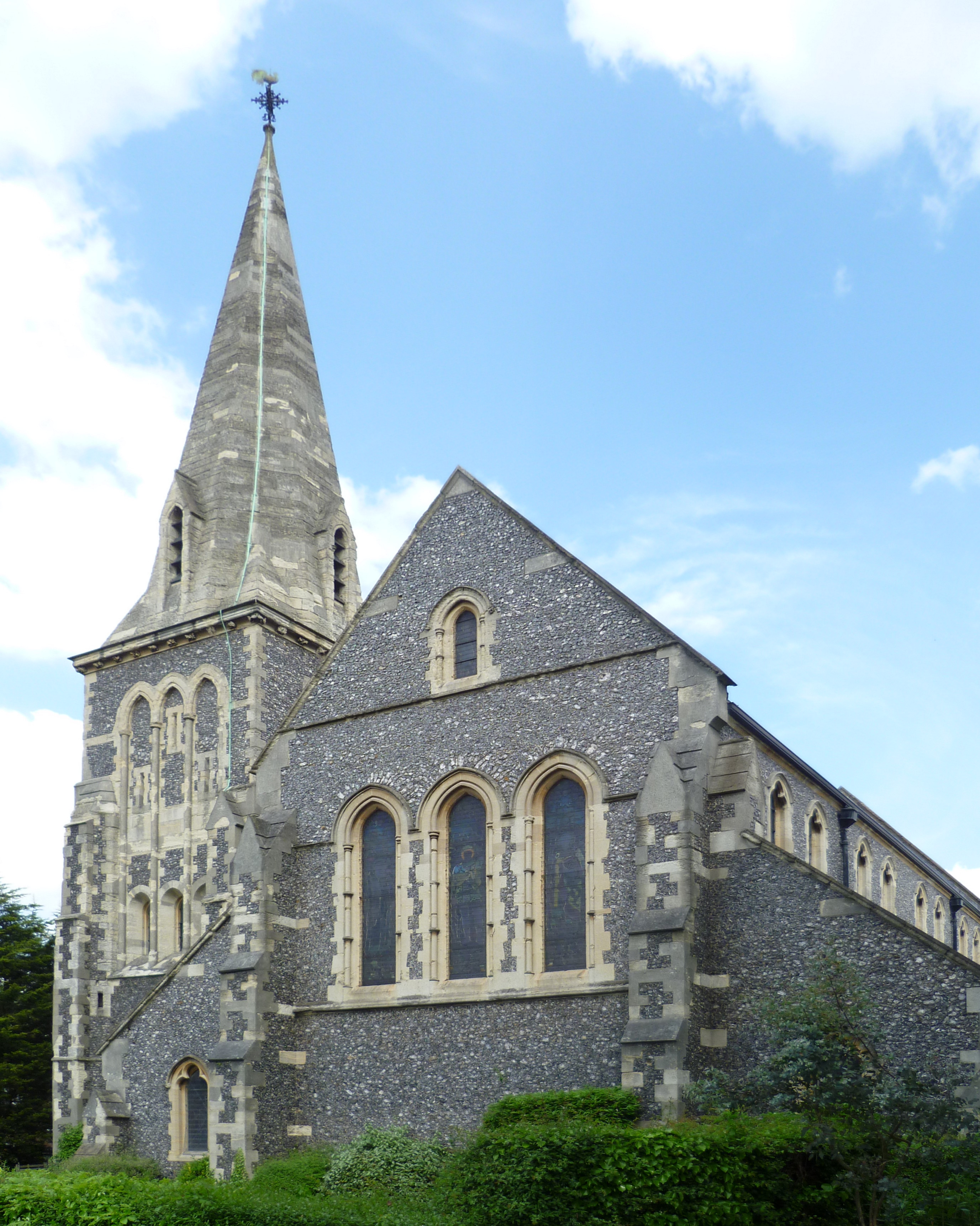
All Saints' Church, Oakleigh Park

=== Bexley ===
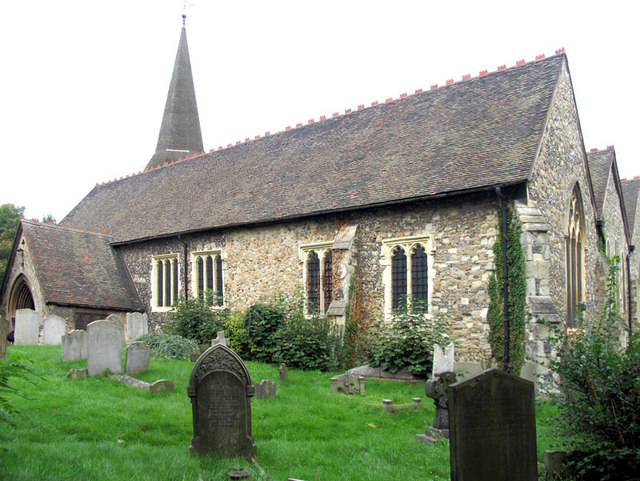
St John the Baptist, Erith

Church name	Location	Dedication	Web	Founded	Denomination	Notes
All Saints, Foots Cray	Foots Cray	All Saints		C12th	Anglican	
St James, North Cray	North Cray	James		C12th	Anglican	Rebuilt 1852. United with All Saints, Foots Cray
St John the Baptist, Erith	Erith	John the Baptist		C12th	Anglican	
St Michael, East Wickham	East Wickham	Michael		C12th	Anglican	Current building 1930, old chapel of ease now Greek Orthodox
Christ Church, Bexleyheath	Bexleyheath	Jesus		1836	Anglican	Current building 1872–1877
St John the Evangelist, Sidcup	Sidcup	John the Evangelist		1844	Anglican	Rebuilt 1900
St John, Welling	Welling	John the Evangelist		1869	Anglican	Current building 1926
Christ Church, Sidcup	Sidcup	Jesus		1879	Anglican	Building c. 1890
Holy Trinity, Lamorbey	Lamorbey	Trinity		late C19th	Anglican	
St Augustine of Canterbury, Belvedere	Belvedere	Augustine of Canterbury		1884	Anglican	Building 1915–1916. Bishop of Richborough
Holy Redeemer, Lamorbey	Lamorbey	Jesus		1909	Anglican	Current building 1933
St Peter, Bexleyheath	Bexleyheath	Peter		1930	Anglican	Building 1956–1957
St Martin, Barnehurst	Barnehurst	Martin of Tours		1931	Anglican	Building 1936–1937
St Mary the Virgin, Welling	Welling	Mary		1934	Anglican	Building 1954–1955
St James the Great, Blendon	Blendon	James		1935	Anglican	Daughter church of St John's Bexley
St Andrew, Sidcup	Sidcup	Andrew		1944	Anglican	Current building 1964–1965
Bishop Ridley Church, Falconwood	Falconwood	Nicholas Ridley		1957–1958	Anglican	Daughter church to St John's Welling
Church of the Cross, South Thamesmead	Thamesmead	Cross		early 1970s	Anglican / Methodist / URC	Thamesmead Team inc. St Paul's & Will Temple
St Mary of the Crays	Crayford	Mary		1842	Roman Catholic	
Our Lady of the Angels Church & Friary	Erith	Mary		1867	Roman Catholic	served by the Capuchin Franciscans
St Lawrence of Canterbury, Sidcup	Sidcup	Laurence of C'bury		1911	Roman Catholic	Building 1930. Formerly served by the Marists
St Stephen, Welling	Welling	Stephen		1923	Roman Catholic	Building 1935
St John Vianney, Bexleyheath	Bexleyheath	John Vianney		1933	Roman Catholic	Building 1959
St John Fisher, Bexley	Bexley	John Fisher		1935	Roman Catholic	Current building 1978
St Thomas More, Bostall Park	Bexleyheath	Thomas More		1936	Roman Catholic	Building 1951
Our Lady of the Rosary, Blackfen	Blackfen	Mary			Roman Catholic	
St John Fisher, Thamesmead	Thamesmead	John Fisher			Roman Catholic	Services held at St John Fisher School, Thamesmead
Christ the Saviour, Welling	Welling	Jesus			Greek Orthodox	
Foots Cray Baptist Church	Foots Cray			1836	Baptist	
Sidcup Baptist Church	Sidcup			1889	Baptist	
Albany Park Baptist Church	Albany Park			1941	Baptist	Plant from Days Lane Baptist
Baldwyns Baptist Church	Bexley			1950	Baptist	
Days Lane Baptist Church	Blackfen				Baptist	
Barnehurst Methodist Church	Barnehurst				Methodist	Lesnes Abbey Methodist Circuit
Bexleyheath Methodist Church	Bexleyheath			1860	Methodist	Lesnes Abbey Methodist Circuit
Pantiles Methodist Church	Bexleyheath				Methodist	Lesnes Abbey Methodist Circuit
Welling Methodist Church	Welling				Methodist	Lesnes Abbey Methodist Circuit
Emmanuel Church Sidcup	Sidcup	Jesus		1879	Methodist / URC	Orpington & Chislehurst Circuit. 1976 merger
Geddes Place United Reformed Church	Bexleyheath				URC	
Welling United Reformed Church	Welling				URC	
Welling Salvation Army	Welling				Salvation Army	
Bethany Gospel Hall, Bexleyheath	Bexleyheath	Bethany			Gospel Hall	
Wellspring Pentecostal Church	Welling			1939	Assemblies of God	Building previously Congregational church
Bexleyheath Community Church	Bexleyheath			1990s	Newfrontiers	
New Community Church, Sidcup	Sidcup				Newfrontiers	
Avery Hill Christian Fellowship	Sidcup			1994	Ichthus?	
New Generation Church	Sidcup				Pioneer Network	
Welling Gospel Chapel	Welling				Independent	

=== Brent ===
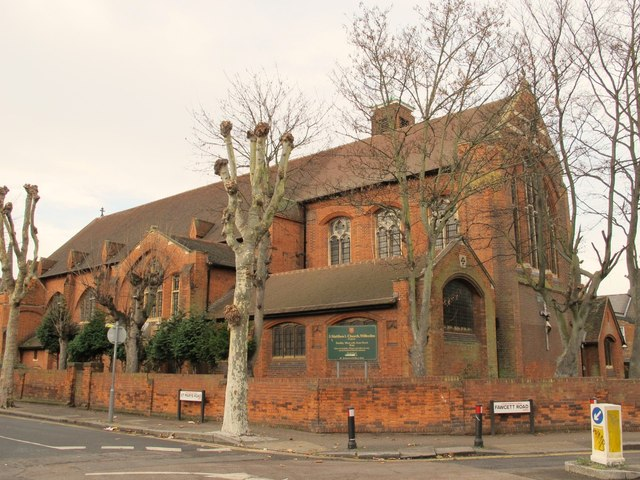
St Matthew, Willesden

Church name	Location	Dedication	Web	Founded	Denomination	Notes
St Mary, Willesden	Willesden	Mary		C10th	Anglican	Contains shrine of Our Lady of Willesden
St Michael the Archangel, Tokyngton	Tokyngton	Michael		Medieval	Anglican	Became parish church 1933
St John the Evangelist, Wembley	Wembley	John the Evangelist		1843–1846	Anglican	
St Anne with Holy Trinity, Brondesbury	Brondesbury	Anne & Trinity		1867	Anglican	Shares building with St Andrew's URC West Kilburn since 1997
St Michael & All Angels, Stonebridge	Stonebridge Park	Michael & Angels		1876	Anglican	May be closed?
Holy Innocents, Kingsbury	Kingsbury	Holy Innocents		1884	Anglican	
St Gabriel, Cricklewood	Cricklewood	Gabriel		1891	Anglican	Building 1897. New Wine
St Matthew, Willesden	Willesden	Matthew		1894	Anglican	Building 1900–1906
St James, Alperton	Alperton	James		1896	Anglican	Building 1912, rebuilt 1990. Services in Tamil, Urdu & Hindi
St Martin, Kensal Rise	Kensal Rise	Martin of Tours		1899	Anglican	
St Catherine, Neasden	Neasden	Catherine of Alex		1901	Anglican	Building 1915–1916. (St Saviour's 1883)
St Mark, Kensal Rise	Kensal Rise	Mark		1903	Anglican	Building 1914
St Andrew, Sudbury	Sudbury	Andrew		1905	Anglican	Building 1926
St Andrew, Kingsbury	Kingsbury	Andrew		1933	Anglican	Building (1847) moved from Marylebone. "Replaced" Old St Andrew's
Annunciation, South Kenton	Kenton	Annunciation		1938	Anglican	
St Cuthbert, North Wembley	North Wembley	Cuthbert		1938	Anglican	Building 1958–1959. Began as daughter to St Andrew Sudbury
Ascension, Wembley Park	Wembley	Ascension		1957	Anglican	Building 1957
Our Lady of Willesden	Willesden	Mary		1886	Roman Catholic	Building 1931
St Joseph, Wembley	Wembley	Joseph		1901	Roman Catholic	served by the Carmelites of Mary Immaculate
St Mary Magdalen, Willesden Green	Willesden Green	Mary Magdalene		1902	Roman Catholic	Building 1906, rebuilt 1938–1939
SS Mary & Andrew, Dollis Hill	Dollis Hill	Mary & Andrew		1913	Roman Catholic	Building 1933
St George, Sudbury	Sudbury	George		1924	Roman Catholic	Building 1927
Five Precious Wounds, Stonebridge	Stonebridge Park	Five Holy Wounds		1926	Roman Catholic	Building 1957, replaced 1967–1968
St Sebastian & Pancras, Kingsbury Green	Kingsbury Green	Sebastian, Pancras		1926	Roman Catholic	
English Martyrs, Wembley Park	Wembley Park	40 English Martyrs		1930	Roman Catholic	Building 1971. Served by the Order of Augustinian Recollects
All Saints, Kenton	Kenton	All Saints		1932	Roman Catholic	Building 1963
St Erconwald, Wembley	Wembley	Earconwald		1932	Roman Catholic	Building 1969–1970
Immaculate Heart of Mary, Kilburn West	Kilburn	Heart of Mary		1948	Roman Catholic	Former Methodist chapel, served by Miss Oblates of Mary Immaculate
Transfiguration, Kensal Rise	Kensal Rise	Transfiguration		1960	Roman Catholic	Moved to current building 1977
St Patrick, Neasden	Neasden	Patrick		1980–1981	Roman Catholic	
Old St Andrew's, Kingsbury	Kingsbury			2008	Romanian Orthodox	Building C12th–13th, redundant 1977, given to R Orth 2008
Lindsay Park Baptist Church	Wembley			1957	Baptist Union	
Kingsbury Free Church (Baptist)	Kingsbury				Baptist	
Kensal Rise Baptist Tabernacle	Kensal Rise			1891	Baptist	Rebuilt 1995
Sudbury Baptist Church	Sudbury			1911	Baptist	
Ealing Road Methodist Church	Wembley				Methodist	Wembley Methodist Circuit
Neasden Methodist Church	Neasden				Methodist	Wembley Methodist Circuit
Park Lane Methodist Church	Wembley			1887	Methodist	Wembley Circuit. New buildings/sites 1895, 1907, 1925, 1962
Queensbury Methodist Church	Queensbury			1936	Methodist	Building 1938. Barnet Methodist Circuit
Sudbury Methodist Church	Sudbury				Methodist	Wembley Methodist Circuit
Harlesden Methodist Church	Harlesden				Methodist	
African Methodist Episcopal Church	Kensal Rise				African Meth Episcopal	Shares Kensal Rise Methodist Church
St Andrew's URC West Kilburn	Kilburn	Andrew			URC	Shares building with St Anne with Holy Trinity, Brondesbury since 1997
SS Margaret & George URC/Moravian Church	Harlesden	Margaret & George			URC / Moravian	
Harlesden Salvation Army	Harlesden				Salvation Army	
Kilburn Salvation Army	Kilburn				Salvation Army	
West Kilburn Baptist Church	West Kilburn			1865	FIEC	
Church of God in Wembley	Wembley				Needed Truth	
Wembley Gospel Hall	Wembley			1894	Gospel Hall	Building 1924
Uxendon Gospel Hall	Wembley				Gospel Hall	
Wembley Church of Christ	Wembley				Churches of Christ	
North Wembley Community SDA Church	Wembley				7th-Day Adventist	
Alpha & Omega Christian Fellowship	Kingsbury				Elim	
Church on the High Road, Willesden	Willesden				Elim	
Elim Community Church Centre, Harlesden	Harlesden				Elim	
Wembley Christian Centre	Wembley			1992	Elim	
New Life Christian Centre International	Wembley			1941	Assemblies of God	
Willesden New Testament Church of God	Willesden				NT Church of God	
Beulah Apostolic Church, Willesden	Willesden			1950s	Church of God in Christ	Planted 5 churches
Calvary Church of God in Christ	Kensal Green				Church of God in Christ	
Christ Apostolic Church (Mount Joy)	Brondesbury				Christ Apostolic Church	Plants in Wrexham, Wolverhampton, Luton
Harlesden Church of God (Seventh Day)	Harlesden				Church of God (7th-Day)	
RCCG Majesty Court	Wembley			1996	RCCG	
Universal Church of the Kingdom of God	Willesden				UCKG	
Ruach City Church Kilburn	Kilburn				Ruach Network	
Apostles' Continuation Church International	Wembley				Apostles' Continuation	
Charismatic Renewal Ministries UK	Neasden				Charis. Renewal	
Spirit of Jesus Church in the UK	Kingsbury				Spirit of Jesus Church	
Church of God Evangelism	Harlesden				Independent	
French Christian Community Bethel	Harlesden				Independent	
Harvest Church	Wembley				Independent	
House on the Rock	Wembley				Independent	
Miracle Signs and Wonders Ministries	Kingsbury				Independent	
New Life Tokyngton Church	Tokyngton				Independent	
Oasis Church Neasden	Neasden				Independent	
True Vine Pentecostal Church	Kilburn				Independent	

=== Bromley ===
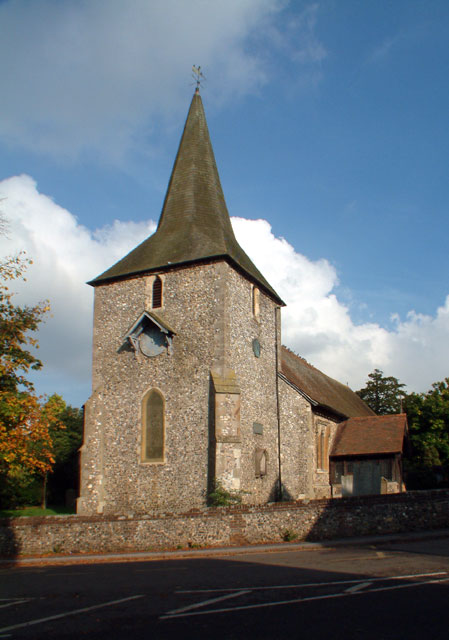
St Mary's Church, Downe

=== Camden ===
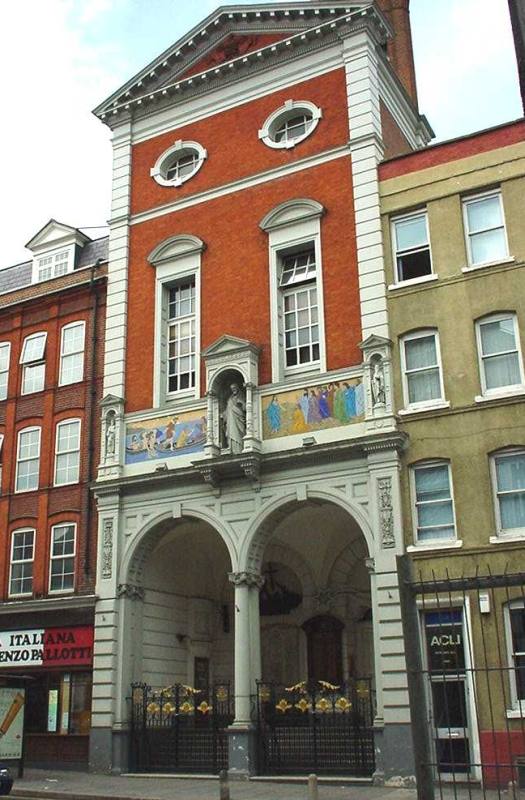
St Peter's Italian Church, Clerkenwell

Church name	Location	Dedication	Web	Founded	Denomination	Notes
St Pancras Old Church	King's Cross	Pancras of Rome		C7th	Anglican	Old St Pancras Team. Derelict by 1847 but restored 1850s
St John-at-Hampstead	Hampstead	John the Evangelist		Medieval	Anglican	Rebuilt 1747, extended 1843, 1878
St Giles-in-the-Fields	St Giles	Giles		C12th	Anglican	Originally a leper hospital chapel. Rebuilt 1630, 1730–1734
St George the Martyr, Holborn	Holborn	George		1703–1706	Anglican	Parish church 1723
St George, Bloomsbury	Bloomsbury	George		1716–1731	Anglican	
St Pancras New Church	King's Cross	Pancras of Rome		1819–1822	Anglican	
St John, Downshire Hill	Hampstead	John the Evangelist		1823	Anglican	Only remaining proprietary chapel in the Diocese of London
St Mary, Somers Town	Somers Town	Mary		1824–1827	Anglican	Old St Pancras Team
St Saviour	Hampstead	Jesus		1848	Anglican	Building 1856
St Paul, Camden Square	Camden Town	Paul		1849	Anglican	Old St Pancras Team. Rebuilt 1950s following war damage
Holy Trinity, Kentish Town	Kentish Town	Trinity		1849–1850	Anglican	
Holy Trinity, Swiss Cottage	Swiss Cottage	Trinity		mid-C19th	Anglican	HTB plant 2006
Christ Church, Hampstead	Hampstead	Jesus		1850–1852	Anglican	
St Mary Magdalene, Munster Square	Regent's Park	Mary Magdalene		1852	Anglican	
St Anne, Highgate	Highgate	Anne		1853	Anglican	
St Mark, Regents Park	Regent's Park	Mark		1853	Anglican	Rebuilt 1957
St Luke, Kentish Town	Kentish Town	Luke		1856	Anglican	Rebuilt 1867. Redundant 1991–2011, reopened as HTB plant
St Peter, Belsize Park	Belsize Park	Peter		1859	Anglican	
St Mary with All Souls, Kilburn	Kilburn	Mary & All Souls		1857–1862	Anglican	United with St James' West Hampstead
St Alban, Holborn	Holborn	Alban		1861–1862	Anglican	Bishop of Fulham
St Martin, Gospel Oak	Gospel Oak	Martin of Tours		1865	Anglican	
St Mary, Primrose Hill	Primrose Hill	Mary		1867	Anglican	Building 1870–1872
Emmanuel, West Hampstead	West Hampstead	Jesus		1875	Anglican	Current building 1897–1903
St Mary Brookfield, Dartmouth Park	Dartmouth Park	Mary		1875	Anglican	
St Cuthbert, West Hampstead	West Hampstead	Cuthbert		1870s	Anglican	Building 1882, rebuilt 1886, 1988
St Silas the Martyr, Kentish Town	Kentish Town	Silas		1877	Anglican	Building 1884, rebuilt 1911–1912
St Benet & All Saints, Kentish Town	Kentish Town	Benedict & All Sts		1881	Anglican	Building 1885, mostly rebuilt 1928
St Michael, Camden Town	Camden Town	Michael		1881	Anglican	Old St Pancras Team
St James, West Hampstead	West Hampstead	James		1882	Anglican	Building 1887–1888. Also hosts a post office and play centre
Holy Cross, St Pancras	King's Cross	Cross		1888	Anglican	
All Hallows, Gospel Oak	Gospel Oak	All Saints		1883–1892	Anglican	
St Luke, Hampstead	Hampstead	Luke		1896	Anglican	
Euston Church	Bloomsbury			2010	Anglican	Plant from St Helen's Bishopsgate, meets in Christ the King
King's Cross Church	King's Cross			2010	Anglican	Plant from St Mary's Bryanston Square
Gray's Inn Chapel	Holborn			C14th	Anglican	Services approximately twice a month
Lincoln's Inn Chapel	Lincoln's Inn Fields			C15th	Anglican	Weekly services. Current building 1623
SS Anselm & Cecilia, Lincoln's Inn Fields	Lincoln's Inn Fields	Anselm & Cecilia		c. 1720	Roman Catholic	Rebuilt c. 1910
St Mary's Chapel, Hampstead	Hampstead	Mary		1796	Roman Catholic	Building 1816
St Aloysius, Somers Town	Somers Town	Aloysius Gonzaga		1798	Roman Catholic	Building 1808, rebuilt mid-1960s
Sacred Heart Church, Kilburn	Kilburn	Sacred Heart		1826?	Roman Catholic	served by the Missionary Oblates of Mary Immaculate
Our Lady Help of Christians, Kentish Town	Kentish Town	Mary		1847	Roman Catholic	First building 1859, moved into old Methodist church 1970
Our Lady of the Rosary & St Dominic	Belsize Park	Mary & Dominic		1861	Roman Catholic	Building 1883. AKA St Dominic's Priory. Served by Dominicans
St Peter's Italian Church	Clerkenwell	Peter		1863	Roman Catholic	Italian church, served by the Pallottines
St Etheldreda, Ely Place	Holborn	Æthelthryth		1874	Roman Catholic	Served by the Rosminians. Building CoE church from C13th
Our Lady of Hal, Camden Town	Camden Town	Mary		1922	Roman Catholic	Building 1933. Established by Belgians
St Thomas More, Swiss Cottage	Swiss Cottage	Thomas More		1938	Roman Catholic	Rebuilt 1968. Served by Opus Dei
All Saints Greek Orthodox Cathedral	Camden Town	All Saints		1948	Greek Orthodox	Building originally CoE church
St Andrew's Greek Orthodox Cathedral	Kentish Town	Andrew		1960s	Greek Orthodox	Building previously St Barnabas' CoE church
SS Cosmas & Damian the Anargyre	Gospel Oak	Cosmas & Damian		1967	Greek Orthodox	
St Archangel Michael & All Angels	Kilburn	Michael & Angels			Macedonian Orthodox	No address found
St George's Cathedral	Kensington Square	George		1989	Antiochian Orthodox	
Bloomsbury Central Baptist Church	Bloomsbury			1848	Baptist	
Chalk Farm Baptist Church	Chalk Farm				Baptist	
King's Cross Methodist Church	King's Cross				Methodist	Part of West London Methodist Mission. Mandarin/Cantonese
Camden Town Methodist Church	Camden Town				Methodist	
Lumen United Reformed Church	Bloomsbury			1808	URC	formerly Ch. of Scotland (Gaelic), then Regent Square URC
Trinity United Reformed Church	Kentish Town	Trinity		1834	URC	Rebuilt 1910. Also hosts North London Metropolitan Church
St Andrew's URC, Hampstead	Hampstead	Andrew			URC	
American International Church	Fitzrovia				URC	Meet in Whitefield's Tabernacle (1756; rebuilt 1890, 1957)
St Mary-le-Savoy	Bloomsbury				German Lutheran	
Luther-Tyndale Memorial Church	Kentish Town			1896	Evangelical Lutheran	Current building 1938
Danish Church of St Katharine	Regent's Park				Church of Denmark	
Friends House, Euston	Euston				Quakers	
Hampstead Quaker Meeting	Hampstead				Quakers	
King's Cross Church of Christ	King's Cross				Churches of Christ	
Intl Christian Ministries Kings Cross	King's Cross			c. 1997	Elim	
Hillsong Church London	Tottenham Court Rd			1992	Assemblies of God	Meets in Dominion Theatre
Revelation Church London	Camden Town			2006	Newfrontiers	
Christ Apostolic Church	Kentish Town				Christ Apostolic	Nigerian. Meets in old St John the Baptist, Kentish Town
London Community Church	Swiss Cottage			1984	Lifelink International	
C3 Church King's Cross	King's Cross			2010s	C3 Global	
Dynamic Faith	Euston				Independent	
Chinese Church in London – Soho	St Giles				Independent	Meets in old Soho Baptist Chapel
London Chinese Lutheran Church	Fitzrovia				Independent	Meet in Whitefield's Tabernacle (1756; rebuilt 1890, 1957)
Radiant City Church London	South Hampstead			2004	Independent	Formerly known as Relentless Church until 2018

==== Defunct churches ====
Church name	Location	Dedication	Founded	Ended	Denomination	Notes
All Saints, Camden Town	Camden Town	All Saints	1822–1824	1948	Anglican	Originally called St Stephen's. Now used by Greek Orthodox
St Stephen, Rosslyn Hill	Belsize Park	Stephen	1869	1977	Anglican	Restored and preserved
St Anne, Laxton Place					Anglican	
St John's Chapel, Bedford Row					Anglican	
St John the Baptist, Kentish Town					Anglican	
Christ the King, Bloomsbury	Bloomsbury		1850–1854	1963	Catholic Apostolic	Building now used by Euston Church (CoE), also Forward in Faith masses

=== Croydon ===
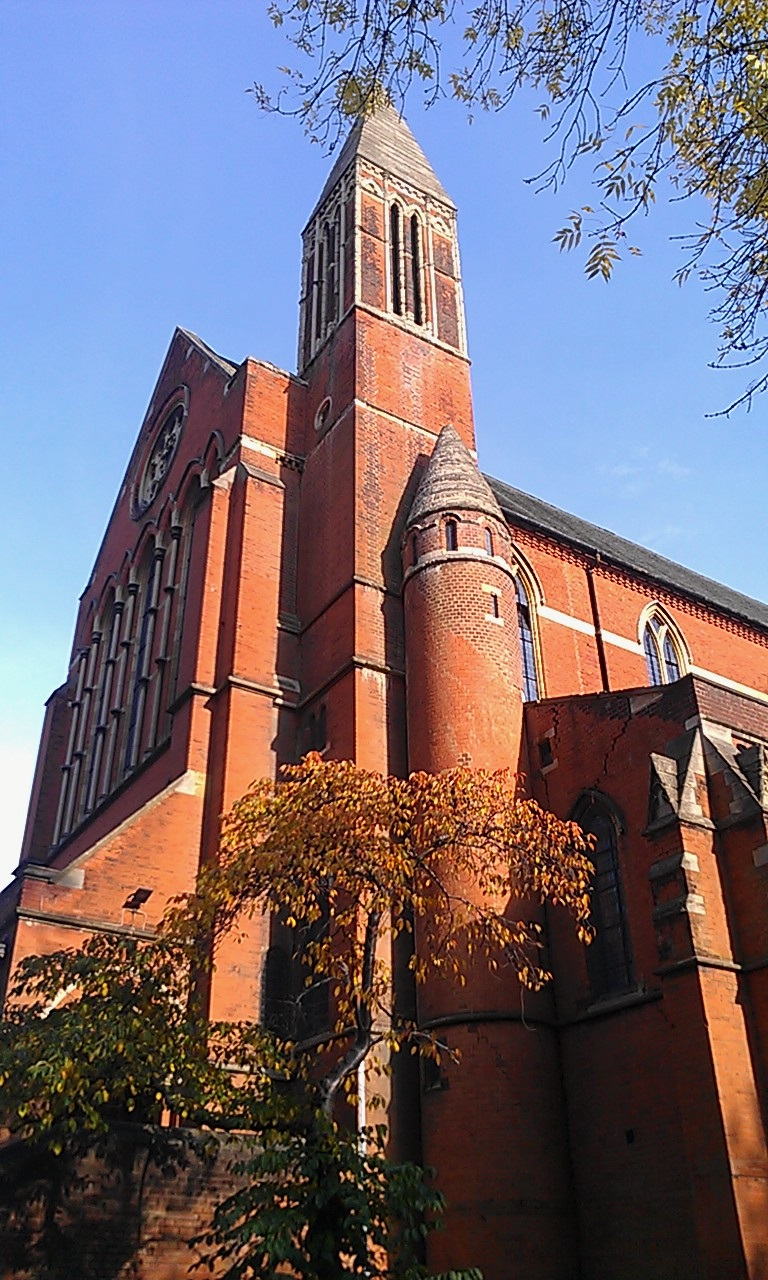
St John the Evangelist, Upper Norwood

Church name	Location	Dedication	Web	Founded	Denomination	Notes
Croydon Minster	Croydon	John the Baptist		C10th	Anglican	
St John the Evangelist, Coulsdon	Coulsdon	John the Evangelist		C11th	Anglican	
St Mary the Virgin, Addington	Addington	Mary		C11th	Anglican	
All Saints, Sanderstead	Sanderstead	All Saints		C12th	Anglican	Sanderstead Parish; current building 1230;
St John the Evangelist, Shirley	Shirley	John the Evangelist		1836	Anglican	Current building 1856
Christ Church, Croydon	Croydon	Jesus		1851	Anglican	Rebuilt 1991
St Peter, South Croydon	South Croydon	Peter		1851	Anglican	South Croydon Benefice
St Andrew, Croydon	Croydon	Andrew		1857	Anglican	
St Matthew, Croydon	Croydon	Matthew		1865	Anglican	Rebuilt 1965
Holy Saviour, Croydon	Croydon	Jesus		1867	Anglican	
St Mary Magdalene, Addiscombe	Addiscombe	Mary Magdalene		1868	Anglican	St Martin's demolished 1990s
All Saints, Kenley	Kenley	All Saints		1870–1872	Anglican	United with St Barnabas Purley
St Michael, Croydon	Croydon	Michael & Angels		1871	Anglican	Bishop of Fulham
St John the Evangelist, Upper Norwood	Upper Norwood	John the Evangelist		1875	Anglican	Current building 1881–1887
Christ Church, Purley	Purley	Jesus		1877–1878	Anglican	
St Augustine, South Croydon	South Croydon	Augustine?		1881	Anglican	South Croydon Benefice
St Stephen, Norbury & Thornton Heath	Norbury	Stephen		1889	Anglican	Current building 1909
Holy Innocents, South Norwood	South Norwood	Holy Innocents		1894–1895	Anglican	
Emmanuel, South Croydon	South Croydon	Jesus		1899	Anglican	
St Mark, Woodcote	Woodcote	Mark		1904	Anglican	Current building 1910
St Andrew, Coulsdon	Coulsdon	Andrew		1911–1914	Anglican	
St James, Riddlesdown	Riddlesdown	James		1915?	Anglican	
St Mary, Sanderstead	Sanderstead	Mary		1925–1926	Anglican	Sanderstead Parish
St Swithun, Purley	Purley	Swithun		1929	Anglican	Current building 1939–1954
St George the Martyr, Shirley	Shirley	George		1937	Anglican	Rebuilt 1951–1952
All Saints, Shirley	Shirley	All Saints		1950s	Anglican	
St Edmund, Riddlesdown	Riddlesdown	Edmund?		1955	Anglican	Sanderstead Parish
St Antony, Hamsey Green	Hamsey Green	Antony?		1957	Anglican	Sanderstead Parish
St Barnabas, Purley	Purley	Barnabas		1958	Anglican	United with Al Saints Kenley
St Edward, King & Confessor, New Addington	New Addington	Edward the Confessor		1958	Anglican	
Our Lady of Reparation, West Croydon	Croydon	Mary		1837	Roman Catholic	First building 1841, current building 1863
Faithful Virgin, Upper Norwood	Upper Norwood	Mary		1842	Roman Catholic	Building 1870. Convent chapel at first
St Andrew, Thornton Heath	Thornton Heath	Andrew		1903	Roman Catholic	Building 1905, current building 1968–1969
St Gertrude, South Croydon	South Croydon	Gertrude?		1903	Roman Catholic	
St Aidan, Coulsdon	Coulsdon	Aidan of Lindisfarne		1907	Roman Catholic	First building 1916, rebuilt 1922, 1931
St Chad, South Norwood	South Norwood	Chad of Mercia		1907	Roman Catholic	Building 1932–1933. Served by the Holy Ghost Fathers
Our Lady of the Annunciation, Addiscombe	Addiscombe	Mary		1925	Roman Catholic	
St Columba, Selsdon	Selsdon	Columba		1927	Roman Catholic	Current building 1960–1962
St John the Baptist, Purley	Purley	John the Baptist		1931	Roman Catholic	Building 1938
St Dominic, Waddon	Waddon	Dominic		1933	Roman Catholic	Building 1948, current 1959–1961
St Mary, Help of Christians, Old Coulsdon	Old Coulsdon	Mary		1941	Roman Catholic	Building 1955, rebuilt 1966
Holy Family, Sanderstead	Sanderstead	Holy Family		1942	Roman Catholic	Building 1957
Good Shepherd, New Addington	New Addington	Jesus		1945	Roman Catholic	Building 1962
SS Mary & Shenouda, Croydon	Coulsdon	Mary & Shenouda?		1995	Coptic Orthodox	Established from St Mark's Kensington
West Croydon Baptist Church	Croydon				Baptist	
Selsdon Baptist Church	Selsdon				Baptist	
West Croydon Methodist Church	Croydon				Methodist	Croydon Circuit
Christ Church Methodist Addiscombe	Addiscombe	Jesus		1869	Methodist	1979 union of two Methodist churches
Coulsdon Methodist Church	Coulsdon				Methodist	
East Croydon United Reformed Church	Croydon				URC	
Clifton Hall	South Norwood			c. 1890	Gospel Hall	Building 1897
Denmark Road Gospel Hall	South Norwood				Gospel Hall	
Croydon Quaker Meeting	Croydon				Quakers	
Elim Pentecostal Church Croydon	Croydon				Elim	
Everyday Church Croydon	Croydon			2012	Newfrontiers	
Croydon Vineyard Church	Croydon				Vineyard	
New Life Croydon	Croydon			c. 1950	Independent	
Redeemer Croydon	Croydon	Jesus		2013	Independent	Plant from St Helen's Bishopsgate
Woodside Green Christian Centre	Addiscombe				Independent	
Rhema Church London	Croydon			1991	Independent	
Life City Church Croydon	Croydon				Independent	

=== Ealing ===
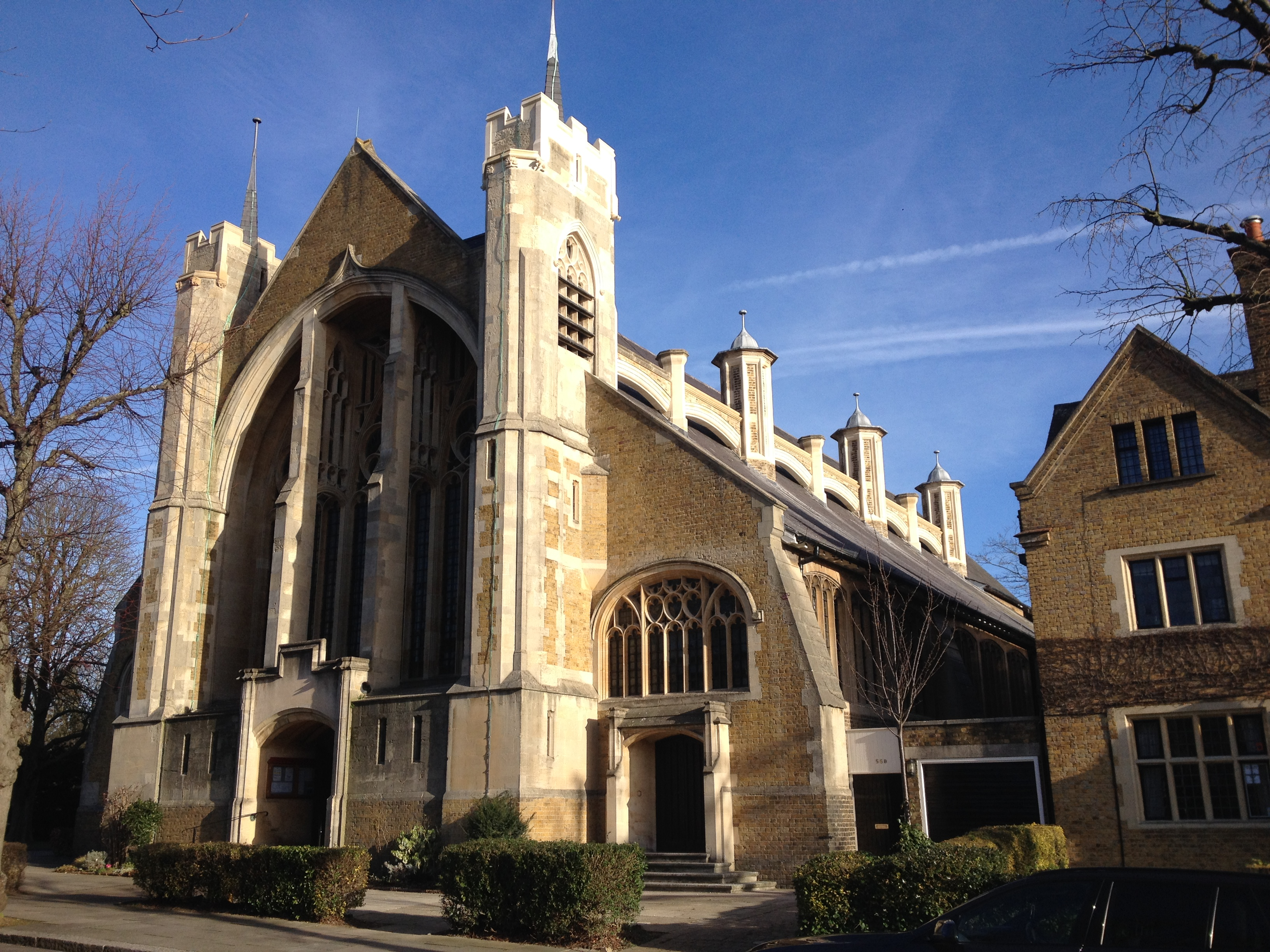
The west front of St Peter's Church, Ealing – amongst "the noblest churches we possess" (John Betjeman)

Church name	Location	Dedication	Web	Founded	Denomination	Notes
St Alban's	Acton Green	Alban		Anglican		
Abbey Church of St Benedict (Ealing Abbey)	Ealing				Roman Catholic	
Acton Hill United Reformed Church	Acton				United Reformed Church	
All Hallows	Greenford	All Saints			Anglican	
All Saints	South Acton	All Saints			Anglican	
All Saints	Ealing	All Saints			Anglican	
Ascension (Church of the)	Hanger Hill	Ascension			Anglican	
Assyrian Church of the East	Hanwell				Assyrian Church of the East	
Berrymead Evangelical Church	Acton				Christian Brethren	
Cathedral of the Dormition & Holy Royal Martyrs	Gunnersbury				Russian Orthodox	
Christ the Redeemer	Southall	Jesus			Anglican	
Christ the Saviour	Ealing	Jesus			Anglican	
Ealing Green United Reformed Church	Ealing				United Reformed Church	
Emmanuel Church	Southall	Jesus			Anglican	
Friends Meeting House	Ealing				Quakers	
Grace Church	Ealing				Anglican	
Haven Green Baptist Church	Ealing Broadway				Baptist	
Holy Cross	Greenford Magna	Cross			Anglican	
Holy Family	West Acton	Holy Family			Roman Catholic	
Holy Trinity	Perivale	Trinity			United Reformed Church	
Holy Trinity	Southall	Trinity			Anglican	
International Presbyterian Church	Ealing				Presbyterian	
Japanese Anglican Church for London	West Acton				Anglican	
Liberal Catholic Church	Ealing				Liberal Catholic	
Living Water Arabic Church	West Ealing				Anglican	
London International church of Christ	Ealing				Intl Church of Christ	
Oak Tree Anglican Fellowship	Acton				Anglican	
Our Lady & St Joseph	Hanwell	Mary & Joseph			Roman Catholic	
Our Lady Mother of the Church	Ealing	Mary			Roman Catholic	(Polish church)
Our Lady of Hungary	Ealing	Mary			Roman Catholic	(Hungarian church)
Our Lady of Lourdes	Acton	Mary			Roman Catholic	
Our Lady of the Visitation	Greenford	Mary			Roman Catholic	
Redeemer	Ealing	Jesus			Newfrontiers	
St Aidan of Lindisfarne	East Acton	Aidan of Lindisfarne			Roman Catholic	(Latin and Ge'ez rites)
St Andrew	Ealing	Andrew			United Reformed Church	
St Anselm	Southall	Anselm of Canterbury			Roman Catholic	
St Barnabas Church	Ealing	Barnabas			Anglican	
St Barnabas	Northolt Park	Barnabas			Anglican	
St Christopher	Hanwell	Christopher			Anglican	
St Dunstan (with St Thomas)	East Acton	Dunstan			Anglican	
St Gabriel	North Acton	Gabriel			Anglican	
St George	Southall	George			Anglican	
St Hugh	Northolt	Hugh?			Anglican	
St James	West Ealing	James			Anglican	
St John, Ealing	West Ealing				Anglican	
St John Fisher	Perivale	John Fisher			Roman Catholic	
St John	Southall Green				Anglican	
St Joseph the Worker	Northolt	Joseph			Anglican	
St Martin	West Acton	Martin of Tours			Anglican	
St Mary	Acton	Mary			Anglican	
St Mary	Ealing	Mary			Anglican	
St Mary	Hanwell	Mary			Anglican	
St Mary	Northolt	Mary			Anglican	
St Mary	Perivale	Mary				Disused
St Mary	West Twyford	Mary			Anglican	
St Mary the Virgin	Norwood Green	Mary			Anglican	
St Matthew	Ealing Common	Matthew			Anglican	
St Mellitus (with St Mark)	Hanwell	Mellitus			Anglican	
St Nicholas (with St Mary)	Perivale				Anglican	
St Nicholas	Shepherd's Bush				Greek Orthodox	
St Paul	Northfields				Anglican	
St Peter	Acton Green				Anglican	
St Peter	Ealing				Anglican	
St Peter and St Paul	Northfields				Roman Catholic	
St Richard	Northolt				Anglican	
St Saviour	Acton				Anglican	London Diocesan Church for the Deaf
St Stephen	West Ealing				Anglican	
St Thomas the Apostle	Hanwell				Anglican	
The Grove Gospel Hall	Ealing				non-denominational	

=== Enfield ===
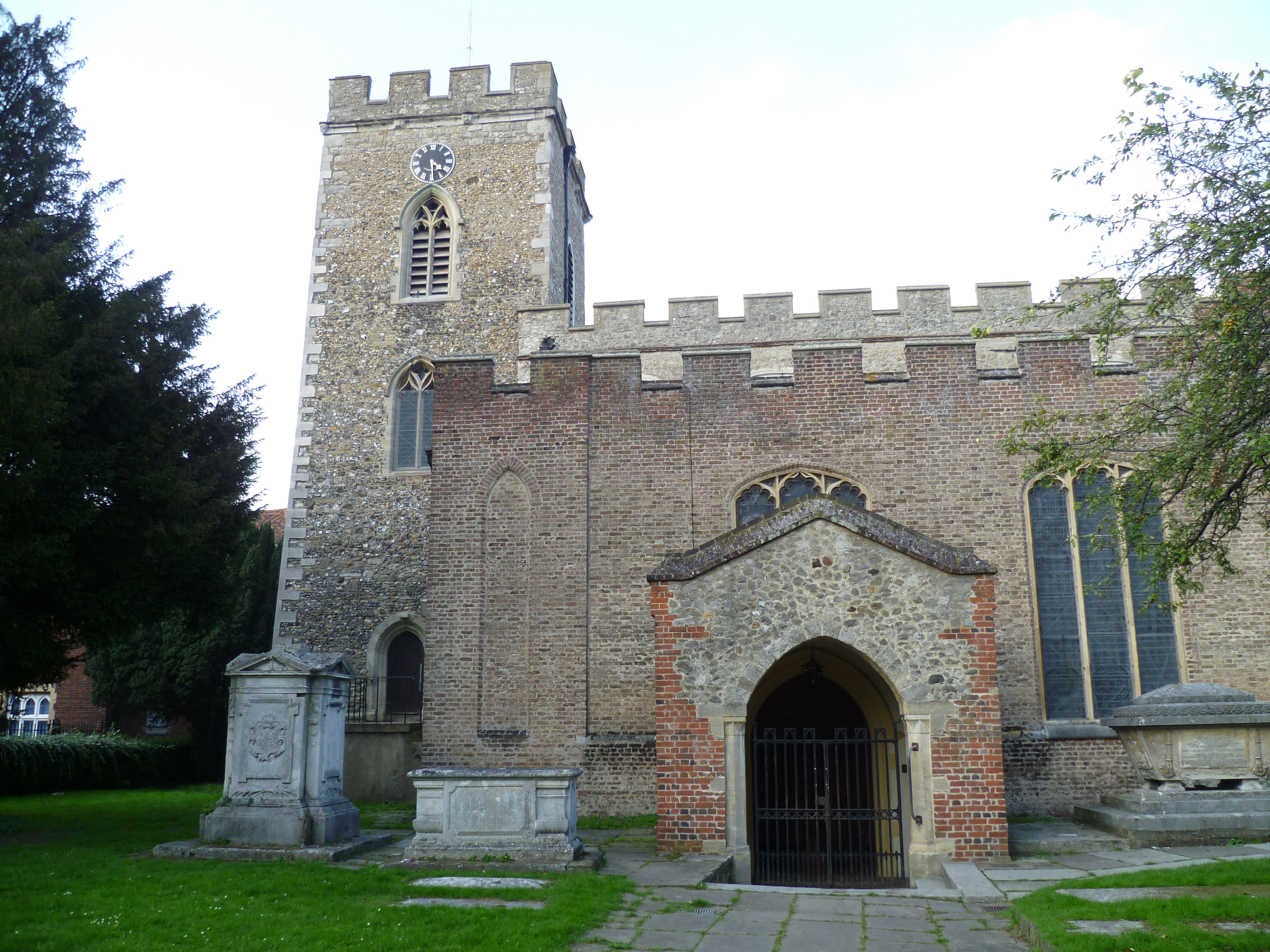
St Andrew's Enfield

=== Greenwich ===
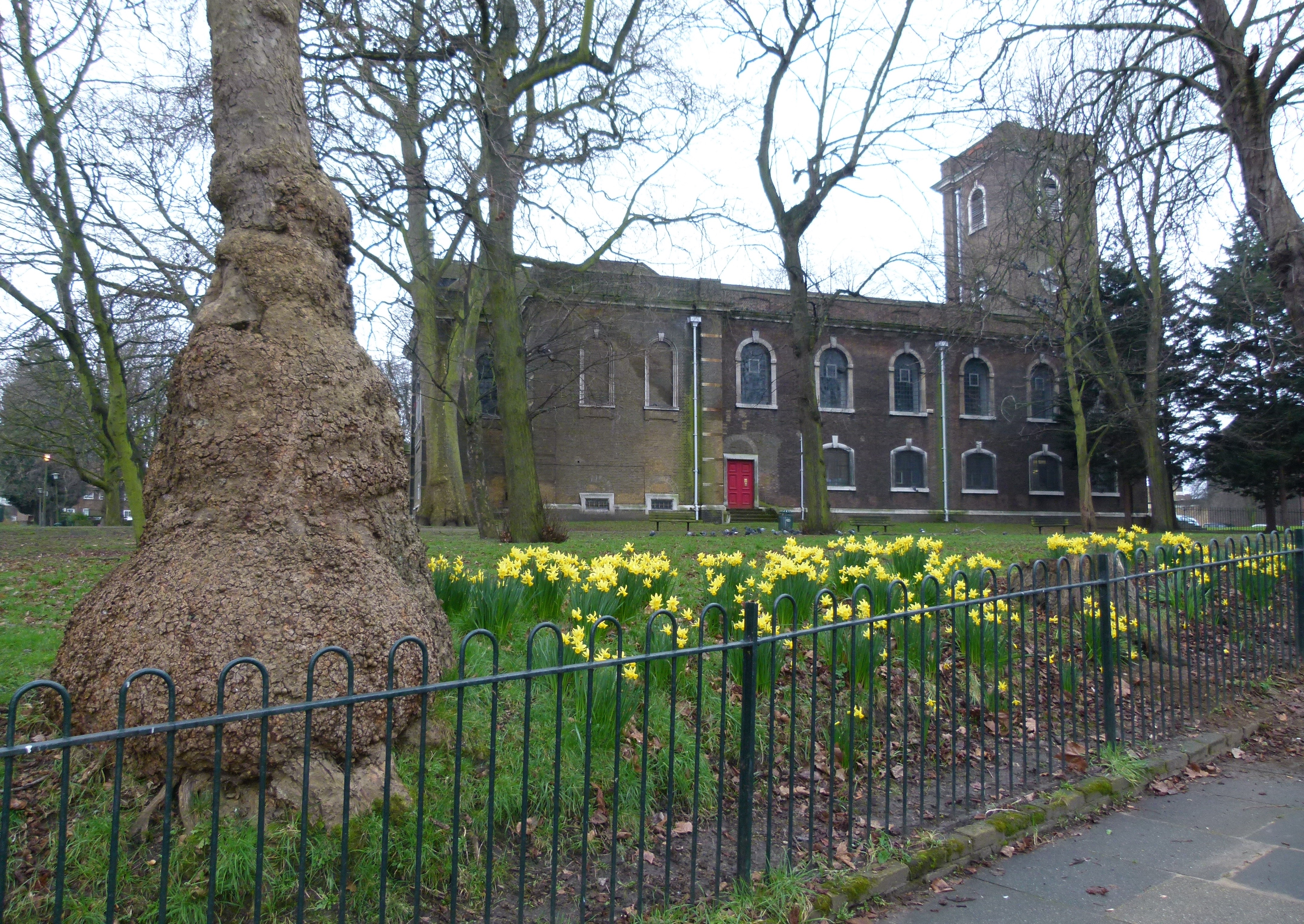
St Mary Magdalene Woolwich

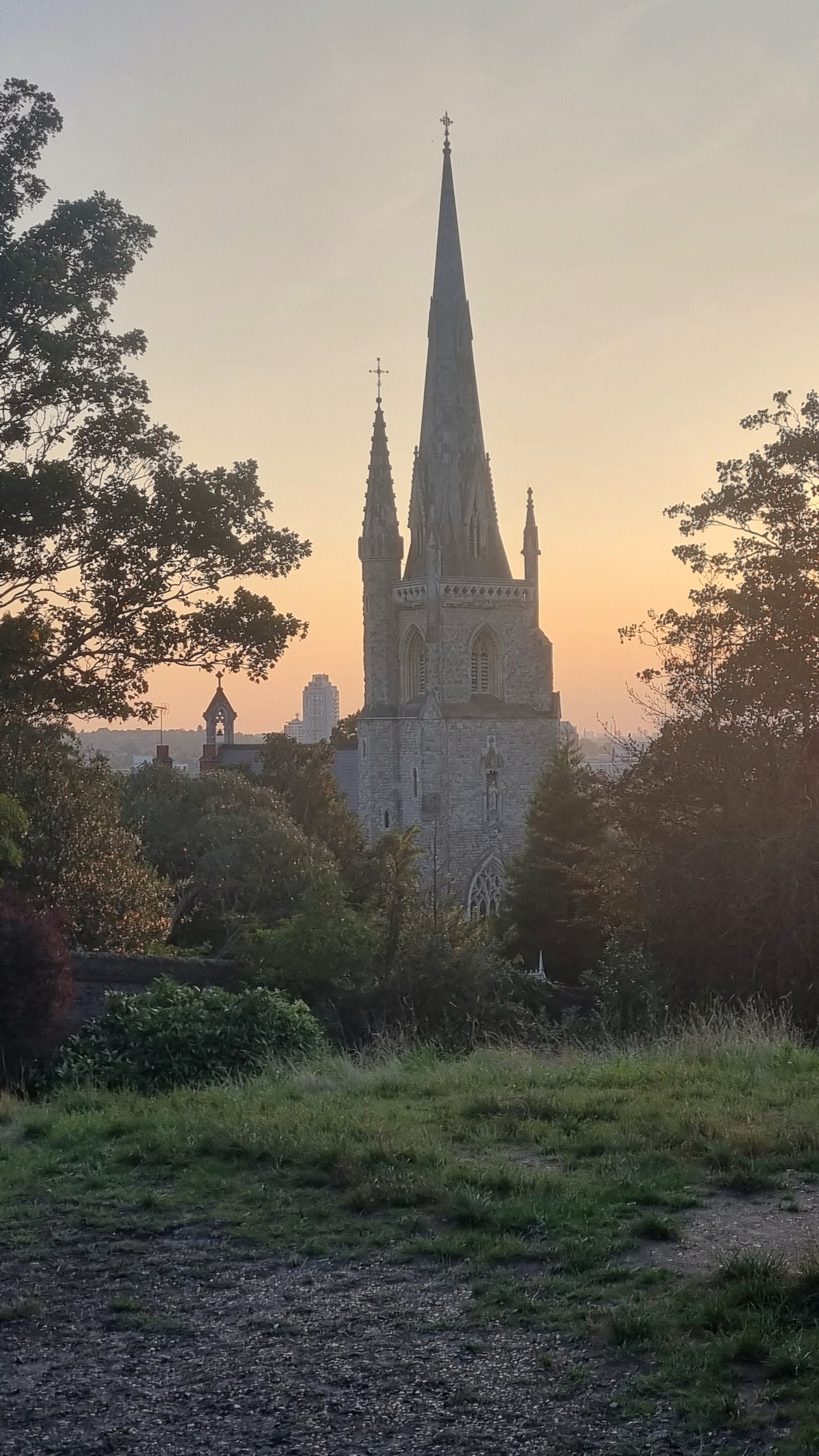
Our Ladye Star of the Sea, Greenwich

Church name	Location	Dedication	Web	Founded	Denomination	Notes
All Saints	New Eltham				Anglican	also used by Roman Catholic
Ascension	Blackheath				Anglican	
Charlton United Reformed Church	Charlton				URC	
Christ Faith Tabernacle Cathedral	Woolwich			1989	Independent	Moved into current premises in 2013
Christchurch Priory	Eltham				Roman Catholic	served by the Canons Regular of the Lateran
Christian Gospel Hall	Greenwich				Plymouth Brethren	
Church Army Chapel	Blackheath				Church Army	now part of Blackheath High School
Congregational Church	Woolwich				Congregational	
Eltham Green Community Church	Eltham				Independent	
Eltham United Reformed Church	Eltham				URC	
Greenwich United Church & The Forum at Greenwich	Greenwich				URC	
Holy Cross	Plumstead Common		–		Roman Catholic	
Meeting House	Blackheath				Quakers	
Potters House Church	Woolwich				Pentecostal	
London International church of Christ	Greenwich				Intl Church of Christ	
New Wine Church	Woolwich				Pentecostal	
Our Lady Help of Christians	Blackheath		–		Roman Catholic	
Our Lady Help of Christians	Mottingham		–		Roman Catholic	
Our Lady of Grace	Charlton		–		Roman Catholic	
Our Ladye Star of the Sea	Greenwich				Roman Catholic	
Royal Naval College Chapel	Greenwich				Anglican	
St Alfege	Greenwich				Anglican	
St Barnabas	Eltham				Anglican	
St Benet	Abbey Wood				Roman Catholic	served by the Congregation of the Mission
St Catherine Labouré	Woolwich				Roman Catholic	
St David	Abbey Wood		–		Roman Catholic	
St George's Garrison Church	Woolwich				–	
St John Fisher	Kidbrooke		–		Roman Catholic	
St Joseph	East Greenwich				Roman Catholic	
St Joseph	Shooters Hill		webmail		Roman Catholic	originally Bible Christian Church
St Mary Magdalene	Woolwich				Anglican	
St Patrick	Plumstead				Roman Catholic	
St Paul	Deptford				Anglican	
St Paul's Ecumenical Centre	Thamesmead		–		R Catholic / URC etc.	
St Peter	Lee				Anglican	
St Peter	Woolwich				Roman Catholic	
St Thomas the Apostle	Charlton				British Orthodox	
SS John Fisher & Thomas More	Eltham		–		Roman Catholic	
The Redeemed Christian Church of God	Mottingham				Pentecostal	
Titmuss Avenue Baptist Church	Thamesmead				Reformed Baptist	
Woolwich Evangelical Church	Woolwich				Reformed Baptist	

=== Hackney ===
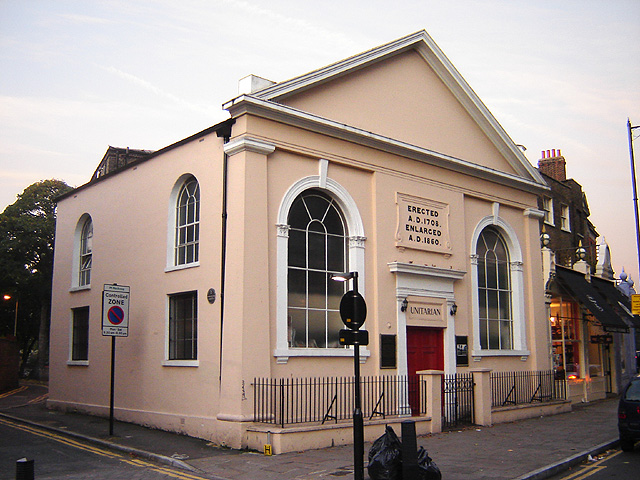
Newington Green Unitarian Church

Church name	Location	Dedication	Web	Founded	Denomination	Notes
Abney Park Chapel	Stoke Newington				Cemetery chapel	Abney Park Cemetery
All Saints Haggerston	Haggerston				Anglican	
Church of Good Shepherd	Upper Clapton				Georgian Orthodox,	formerly Agapemonite and Ancient Catholic
Clapton Park & Dalston United Reformed Church	Lower Clapton				URC	
Homerton Baptist Church	Homerton			1817	Grace Baptist	formerly Homerton Row Chapel (1821–1861), and Barnabas Road Baptist Church (1862–1996)
Hope City Church	Stoke Newington				C3 Movement	
Immaculate Heart of Mary & St Dominic	Homerton				Roman Catholic	
Little Sisters Of Jesus Open House Chapel	Haggerston				Roman Catholic	
Manor Road United Reformed Church	Stoke Newington				URC	
Our Lady & St Joseph	Kingsland				Roman Catholic	
Our Lady of Good Counsel	Stoke Newington				Roman Catholic	
Potter's House Christian Centre	London Fields				Potter's House	
Rectory Road United Reformed Church	Stoke Newington				URC	
St Andrew, Stoke Newington	Stoke Newington				Anglican	
St Augustine	Hackney Central				Anglican	Knights Templar. Tower only remains
St John-at-Hackney	Hackney Central				Anglican	
St John's Hoxton	Hoxton				Anglican	
St John the Baptist	Hackney Central				Roman Catholic	
St John the Theologian	Hackney Central				Greek Orthodox	
St Jude	Clapton Park				Roman Catholic	
St Leonard	Shoreditch				Anglican	
St Matthias	Stoke Newington				Anglican	
St Monica	Hoxton				Roman Catholic	Augustinian Priory
St Scholastica	Upper Clapton				Roman Catholic	
St Thomas More	Manor House				Roman Catholic	
Stamford Hill United Reformed Church	Stamford Hill				URC	
Stoke Newingon Quakers	Stoke Newington				Quakers	
Newington Green Unitarian Church	Newington Green				Unitarians	
Stoke Newington Society	Stoke Newington				Moravian	
Upper Clapton United Reformed Church	Upper Clapton				URC	

=== Hammersmith and Fulham ===
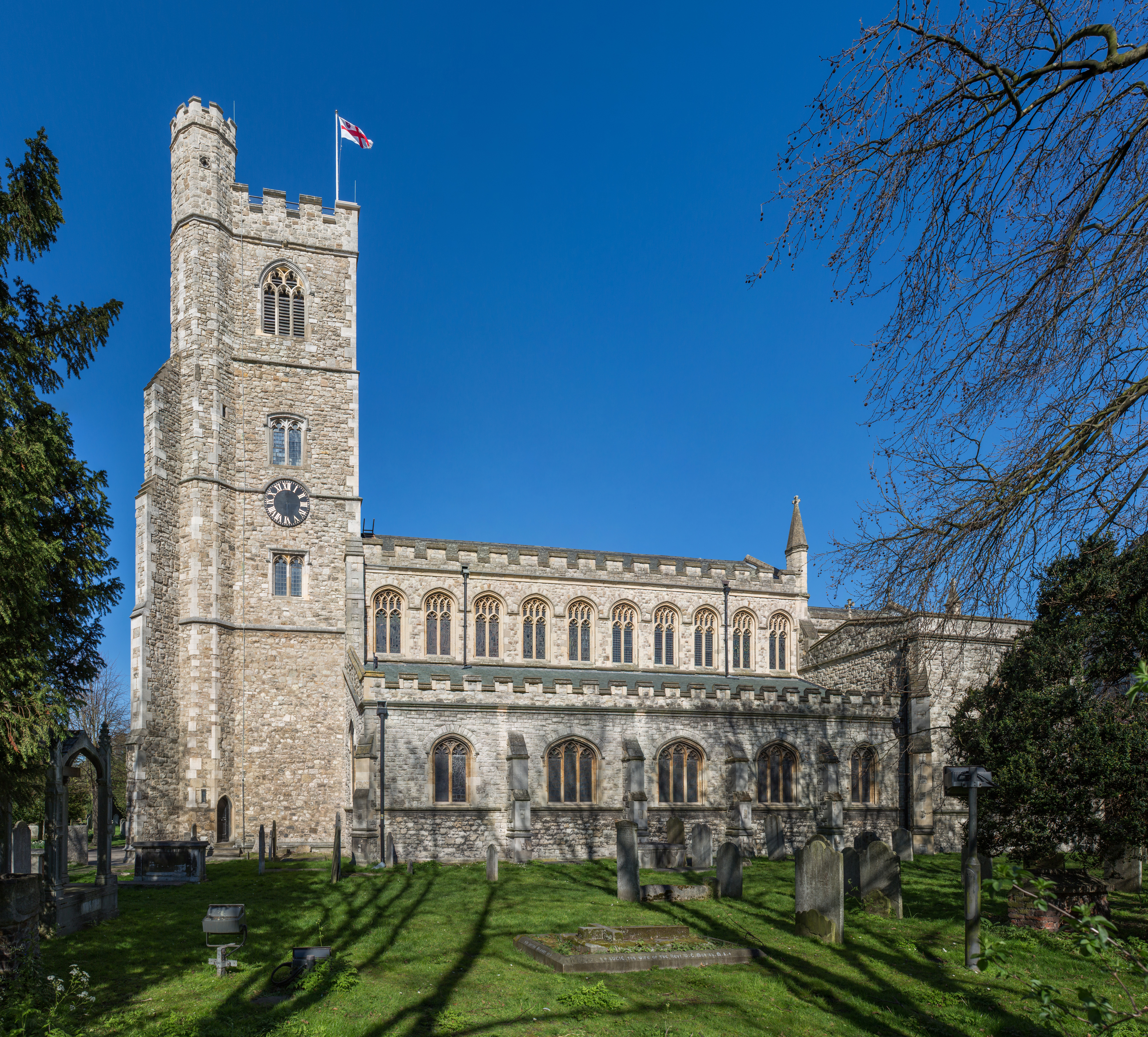
All Saints Church, Fulham

Church name	Location	Dedication	Web	Founded	Denomination	Notes
All Saints	Fulham				Anglican	
Every Nation Church London	Hammersmith				Evangelical	
Friends Meeting House	Hammersmith				Quakers	
Fulham United Reformed Church	Fulham				URC	
Holy Cross	Parsons Green				Roman Catholic	
Holy Ghost & St Stephen	Shepherd's Bush				Roman Catholic	
Holy Innocents & St John	Ravenscourt Park				Anglican	
Holy Trinity	Brook Green				Roman Catholic	also used by Syriac Catholic Church
Hungarian Reformed Church	Hammersmith				Hungarian Reformed	
Our Lady of Fatima	White City				Roman Catholic	
Our Lady of Perpetual Help	Fulham				Roman Catholic	
RCCG Fulham	Fulham				RCCG	
St Andrew	Fulham				Anglican	
St Andrew Bobola	Shepherd's Bush				Roman Catholic	Polish church
St Augustine	Hammersmith				Roman Catholic	
St Dionis	Parsons Green				Anglican	
St Etheldreda with St Clement	Fulham				Anglican	
St. Euphrosynia of Polotsk	Ravenscourt Park				Belarusian Orthodox	
St Katherine	East Acton				Anglican	
St Michael and St George	White City				Anglican	
St Paul	Hammersmith				Anglican	
St Peter	Hammersmith				Anglican	
St Simon	Shepherd's Bush				Anglican	
St Stephen	Shepherd's Bush				Anglican	
St Thomas of Canterbury Church, Fulham	Fulham	1847			Roman Catholic	Only complete A. W. Pugin church in London
Shepherd's Bush United Reformed Church	Shepherd's Bush				URC	
Twynholm Baptist Church	Fulham				FIEC	

=== Haringey ===
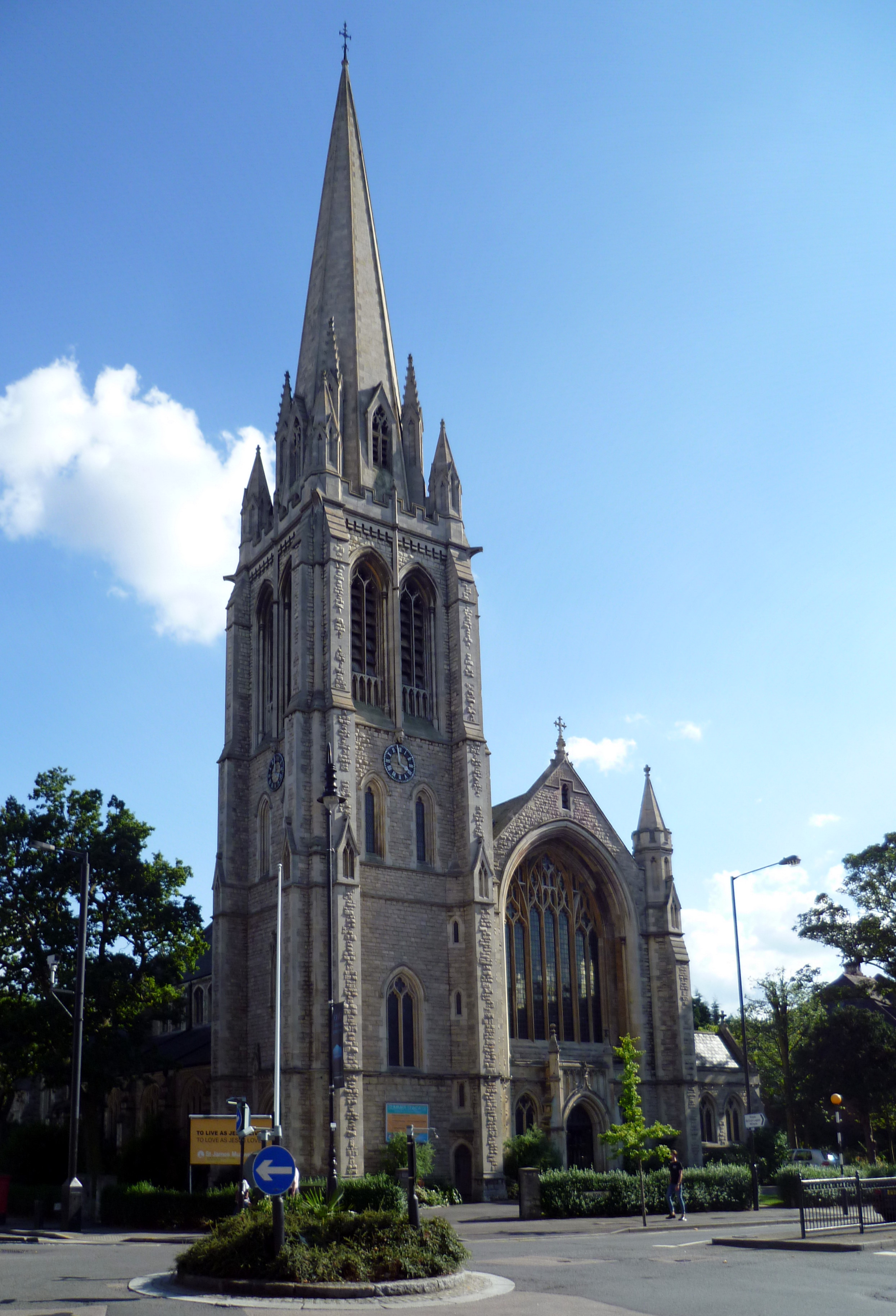
St James' Church, Muswell Hill

Church name	Location	Dedication	Web	Founded	Denomination	Notes
Alexandra Park Parish Church	Muswell Hill				Anglican	
All Hallows	Tottenham				Anglican	
All Saints	Highgate				Anglican	
Braemar Avenue Baptist Church	Wood Green				Baptist	
Brook Street Chapel	Tottenham					
Calvary Church of God in Christ	Northumberland Park				Pentecostal	
Cathedral of the Dormition of the Mother of God	Wood Green				Greek Orthodox	
Chapel of the Resurrection	Muswell Hill				Greek Orthodox	
Christ Church	Crouch End				Anglican	
Christ Church	West Green				Anglican	
Derby Hall Christian Assembly	West Green				Assemblies of God	
Eldon Road Baptist Church	Wood Green				Baptist	
Eritrean Bethel Church	Wood Green					
Freedom's Ark	Tottenham					
Friends Meeting House	Tottenham				Quakers	
Kingdom Life Ministries	Tottenham					
Grace Baptist Chapel	Tottenham				Strict Baptist	
Grace Church	Muswell Hill				Anglican	
Grace Evangelical Church London	Crouch End				Tamil Church	
Highgate International Church	Highgate					
Highgate United Reformed Church	Highgate				URC	
High Cross United Reformed Church	Tottenham				URC	
Holy Innocents	Hornsey				Anglican	
Holy Trinity	Stroud Green				Anglican	
Holy Trinity	Tottenham				Anglican	
Holy Trinity	Tottenham				Lutheran	
Hornsey Moravian Church	Hornsey				Moravian Church	
Hornsey Parish Church	Hornsey				Anglican	
Jubilee Church Wood Green	Wood Green				Newfrontiers	
La Bergerie Christian Church	Tottenham					
London International church of Christ	Alexandra Park				Intl Church of Christ	
London Miracle Centre, Mt Zion Restoration Mins	Tottenham					
Middle Lane Methodist Church	Hornsey				Methodist	
Miller Memorial Church	Tottenham				Methodist	
Millyard Seventh Day Baptist Church	Tottenham				Seventh Day Baptist	
Muswell Hill & Alexandra Park URC	Muswell Hill				URC	
Muswell Hill Baptist Church	Muswell Hill				Baptist	
Muswell Hill Methodist Church	Muswell Hill				Methodist	
New River Community Church	Muswell Hill				Evangelical	
New Testament Ch of God Cathedral of Praise	Wood Green				New Test Church of God	
North London Vineyard	Alexandra Park				Vineyard	
Our Lady of Muswell	Muswell Hill				Roman Catholic	
Potter's House	Tottenham				Potter's House	
Rainbow Theatre	Finsbury Park				UCKG	
Salvation Army Tottenham Corps	Tottenham				Salvation Army	
St Andrew	Muswell Hill				Anglican	
St Ann	South Tottenham				Anglican	
St Augustine	Highgate				Anglican	
St Barnabas	Wood Green				Greek Orthodox	
St Benet Fink	Tottenham				Anglican	
St Cuthbert	Wood Green				Anglican	
St Francis de Sales	Tottenham				Roman Catholic	
St George	Stamford Hill				Georgian Orthodox	
St Ignatius	Stamford Hill				Roman Catholic	served by the Society of Jesus
St James	Muswell Hill				Anglican	
St John & St James	Tottenham				Anglican	
St John the Baptist	Harringay				Greek Orthodox	
St John Vianney	West Green				Roman Catholic	
St Mark Methodist Church	Tottenham				Methodist	
St Mark	Noel Park				Anglican	
St Mary	Tottenham				Anglican	
St Michael	Highgate				Anglican	
St Michael	Wood Green				Anglican	
St Olave	Finsbury Park				Anglican	
St Paul	Harringay				Anglican	
St Paul	Tottenham				Anglican	
St Paul the Apostle	Wood Green				Roman Catholic	
St Peter-in-Chains	Stroud Green				Roman Catholic	
St Philip the Apostle	Tottenham				Anglican	
St Thomas the Apostle	Finsbury Park				Anglican	
St Augustine	Highgate				Anglican	
Stroud Green Baptist Church	Stroud Green				Baptist	
The Gospel Centre	Harringay				Harvest Comm Network	
The People's Christian Fellowship	Tottenham				Evangelical	
Tollington Park Baptist Church	Finsbury Park				Baptist	
Tottenham Baptist Church	Tottenham				Baptist	
Tottenham Seventh-day Adventist Church	Tottenham				7th-day Adventist Church	
Union Church & Community Centre	Crouch End				URC	
Westbury Avenue Baptist Church	Wood Green				Baptist	
Willoughby Methodist Church	Hornsey				Methodist	
Wilton Community Church	Muswell Hill				Evangelical	
Wood Green Mennonite Church	Wood Green				Mennonite	
Wood Green Salvation Army Centre	Wood Green				Salvation Army	
Wood Green UCKG HelpCentre	Wood Green				UCKG	
Woodberry Down Baptist Church	South Tottenham				Baptist	

=== Harrow ===
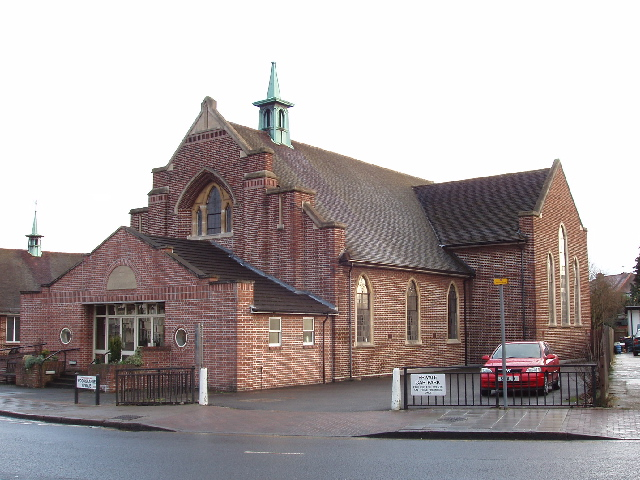
Kenton Methodist Church

Church name	Location	Dedication	Web	Founded	Denomination	Notes
All Saints	Harrow Weald				Anglican	
Belmont Gospel Hall	Harrow				Non-denominational	
Cannon Lane Methodist Church	Pinner				Methodist	
Culver Evangelical Church	Belmont					
Elmfield Evangelical Church	North Harrow					
Friends Meeting House	Harrow				Quakers	
Good News Church	Harrow Weald					
Harrow Baptist Church	Harrow				Baptist	
Hatch End Free Church	Hatch End				Baptist	
Holy Trinity Church	Wealdstone				Anglican	
Kenton Baptist Church	Kenton				Baptist	
Kenton Evangelical Church	Kenton				Evangelical	
Kenton Methodist Church	Kenton				Methodist	
King's Church	West Harrow				Newfrontiers	
Little Stanmore Baptist Church	Queensbury				Baptist	
London International Church of Christ	Harrow				Intl Church of Christ	
New Life Bible Church	Wealdstone				Charismatic	
North Harrow Methodist Church	North Harrow				Methodist	
Our Lady & St Thomas of Canterbury	Harrow-on-the-Hill				Roman Catholic	
Pinner Free Church	Pinner				Baptist	
Pinner Methodist Church	Pinner				Methodist	
Rayners Lane Baptist Church	Rayners Lane				Baptist	
Roxeth Green Free Church	Roxeth					
South Harrow Methodist Church	Harrow				Methodist	
South Harrow Baptist Church	South Harrow				Baptist	
St Alban	North Harrow				Anglican	
St Andrew	Eastcote				URC	
St Andrew	Roxbourne				Anglican	
St Anselm Belmont	Harrow				Anglican	
St Gabriel	South Harrow				Roman Catholic	
St George	Headstone				Anglican	
St John	Kenton				URC	
St John Fisher	North Harrow				Roman Catholic	
St John the Baptist, Pinner	Pinner				Anglican	
St John the Evangelist	Stanmore				Anglican	
St Joseph	Wealdstone				Roman Catholic	
St Lawrence	Little Stanmore				Anglican	
St Luke	Pinner				Roman Catholic	
St Mary	Harrow-on-the-Hill				Anglican	
St Mary the Virgin	Kenton				Anglican	
St. Panteleimon	Harrow				Greek Orthodox	
St Paul	South Harrow				Anglican	
St Peter	West Harrow				Anglican	
St Teresa of the Child Jesus	Hatch End				Roman Catholic	
St William of York	Stanmore				Roman Catholic	
Stanmore Baptist Church	Stanmore				Baptist	
Trinity United Reformed Church	Harrow				URC	
Wealdstone Baptist Church	Wealdstone				Baptist	

=== Havering ===
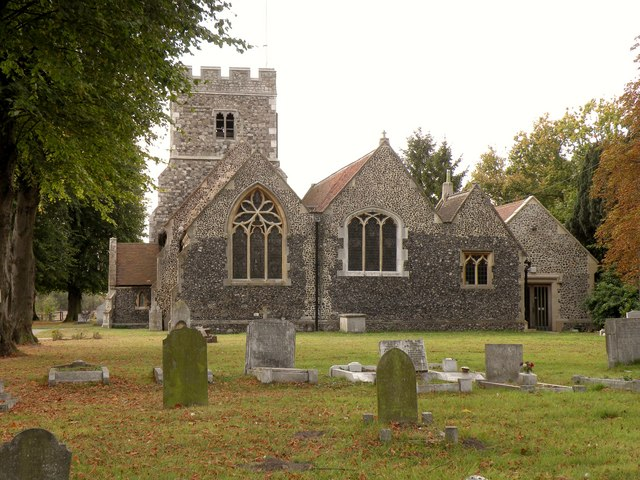
Church of St Mary Magdalene, North Ockendon

Church name	Location	Dedication	Web	Founded	Denomination	Notes
All Saints	Cranham		–		Anglican	
All Saints	Squirrels Heath, Gidea Park		–		Anglican	
Christ the Eternal High Priest	Gidea Park		–		Roman Catholic	
Church on Sutton's Farm	Hornchurch				Anglican	closed 26 September 2010
Collier Row Gospel Hall	Collier Row		–		Non-denominational	
Corpus Christi	Collier Row				Roman Catholic	
English Martyrs	Hornchurch		–		Roman Catholic	
Friends Meeting House	Gidea Park		–		Quakers	
Holy Cross	Hornchurch		–		Anglican	
Moor Lane Church	Cranham		–		Anglican	
Most Holy Redeemer	Harold Hill		–		Roman Catholic	
New Apostolic Church	Romford		–		New Apostolic Church	
Our Lady of La Salette	Rainham		–		Roman Catholic	
St Agnes	Romford				Anglican	
St Alban	Elm Park		–		Roman Catholic	
St Alban	Romford		–		Anglican	
St Andrew	Hornchurch				Anglican	
St Andrew	Romford				Anglican	
St Augustine of Canterbury	Rush Green		–		Anglican	
St Dominic	Harold Hill		–		Roman Catholic	
St Edward the Confessor	Romford	Blessed Virgin Mary & Edward the Confessor		1410	Anglican	Parish church since 1848; rebuilt 1850
St Edward the Confessor Catholic	Romford				Roman Catholic	
St George	Harold Hill				Anglican	
St George	Hornchurch				Anglican	
St Helen & St Giles	Rainham		–		Anglican	
St James	Collier Row		–		Anglican	
St John	Havering-atte-Bower		–		Anglican	
St John & St Matthew	South Hornchurch				Anglican	
St Joseph	Upminster		–		Roman Catholic	
St Laurence	Upminster				Anglican	
St Luke	Cranham		–		Anglican	
St Mary & St Peter	Wennington		–		Anglican	
St Mary Magdalene	North Ockendon		–		Anglican	
St Mary Mother of God	Hornchurch				Roman Catholic	
St Matthew	Hornchurch				Anglican	
St Michael & All Angels	Gidea Park				Anglican	
St Nicholas	Elm Park				Anglican	
St Paul	Harold Hill				Anglican	
St Peter	Harold Wood				Anglican	
St Peter's Mass Centre	Cranham		–		Roman Catholic	
St Thomas	Noak Hill				Anglican	
The Ascension	Collier Row		–		Anglican	
The Good Shepherd	Collier Row		–		Anglican	

=== Hillingdon ===
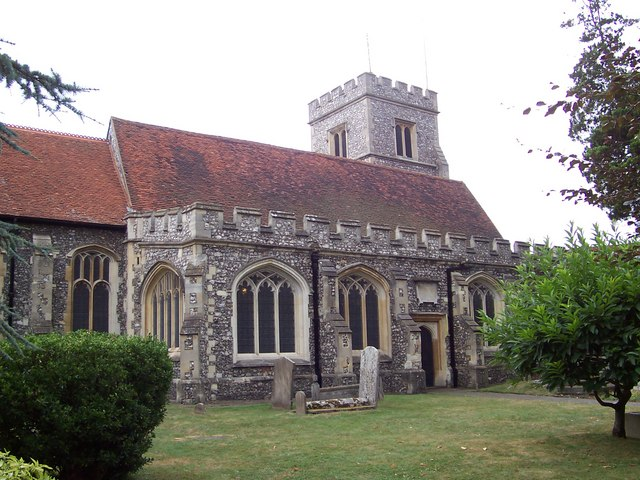
St Martin's Church, Ruislip

Church name	Location	Dedication	Web	Founded	Denomination	Notes
Christ Church	Uxbridge				Methodist/URC	
Friends Meeting House	Uxbridge				Quakers	
Harlington Baptist Church	Harlington				Baptist	
Hayes Town Chapel	Hayes				Congregational	
Holy Trinity	Northwood				Anglican	
Ickenham United Reformed Church	Ickenham				URC	
Immaculate Heart of Mary	Hayes				Roman Catholic	served by the Claretians
Most Sacred Heart	Ruislip				Roman Catholic	
Northwood Hills United Reformed Church	Northwood				URC	
Our Lady of Lourdes & St Michael	Uxbridge				Roman Catholic	
St Andrew	South Ruislip				Evangelical Lutheran	
St Andrew	Uxbridge				Anglican	
St Bernadette	Hillingdon				Roman Catholic	
St Catherine	West Drayton				Roman Catholic	
St George	Heathrow Airport				Interdenominational	
St Giles	Ickenham				Anglican	
St Gregory the Great	South Ruislip				Roman Catholic	
St John	Northwood				URC	
St John the Baptist	Hillingdon				Anglican	
St Laurence	Cowley				Anglican	
St Margaret	Uxbridge				Anglican	
St Martin	Ruislip				Anglican	
St Martin	West Drayton				Anglican	
St Mary	Harefield				Anglican	
St Mary	Harmondsworth				Anglican	
St Mary	Hayes				Anglican	
St Matthew	Northwood				Roman Catholic	
St Matthew	Yiewsley				Anglican	
St Raphael	Yeading				Roman Catholic	
St Thomas More	Eastcote				Roman Catholic	
SS Peter and Paul	Harlington				Anglican	
St Paul	Harefield				Roman Catholic	
Waterloo Road Church	Uxbridge				Evangelical	

=== Hounslow ===
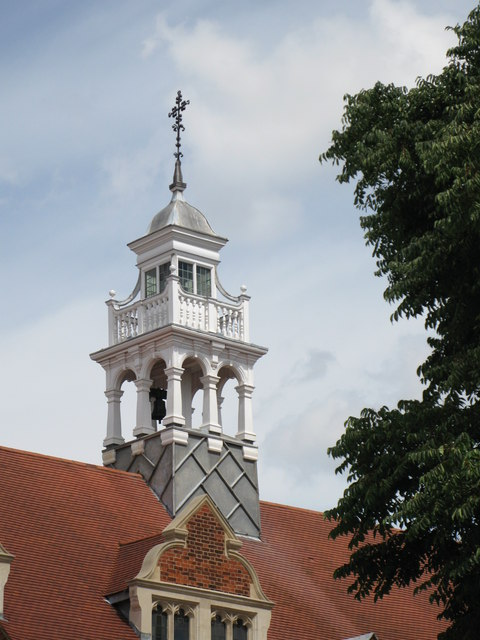
St Michael and All Angels, Bedford Park

Church name	Location	Dedication	Web	Founded	Denomination	Notes
All Saints	Hanworth				Anglican	
All Saints	Isleworth				Anglican	
Brentford & Isleworth Friends Meeting House	Isleworth		–		Quakers	
Brentford Free Church	Brentford		–		URC	
Cathedral of the Dormition & the Holy Royal Martyrs	Gunnersbury				Russian Orthodox	
Chiswick Baptist Church	Chiswick High Road				Baptist	
Christ Church	Turnham Green				Anglican	
Hanworth Gospel Hall	Hanworth				non-denominational	
Heston United Reformed Church	Heston		–		URC	
Holy Trinity	Hounslow				Anglican	
Hounslow Methodist Church	Hounslow				Anglican	
Hounslow United Reformed Church	Hounslow				URC	
Our Lady & St Christopher	Cranford				Roman Catholic	
Our Lady of Grace & St Edward	Chiswick				Roman Catholic	
Our Lady of Sorrows & St Bridget	Isleworth				Roman Catholic	
Our Lady Queen of the Apostles	Heston				Roman Catholic	
Redeemed Christian Church of God	London				Pentecostal	
St Dunstan	Cranford				Anglican	
St Dunstan	Feltham				Anglican	
St Dunstan	Gunnersbury				Roman Catholic	
St Faith	Brentford				Anglican	
St Francis of Assisi	Isleworth				Anglican	
St George	Hanworth				Anglican	
St John the Baptist	Isleworth				Anglican	
St John the Evangelist	Brentford				Roman Catholic	
St Joseph	Grove Park, Chiswick				Roman Catholic	
St Lawrence	Feltham				Roman Catholic	
St Leonard	Heston				Anglican	
St Mary	Osterley				Anglican	
St Mary the Virgin	Bedfont				Anglican	
St Michael	Chiswick				Anglican	
St Michael and All Angels	Bedford Park				Anglican	
St Nicholas	Chiswick				Anglican	
St Paul	Brentford				Anglican	
St Paul	Hounslow				Anglican	
St Vincent de Paul	Osterley				Roman Catholic	
SS Michael & Martin	Hounslow				Roman Catholic	
United Free Church	Feltham		–		United Reformed Church	

=== Islington ===
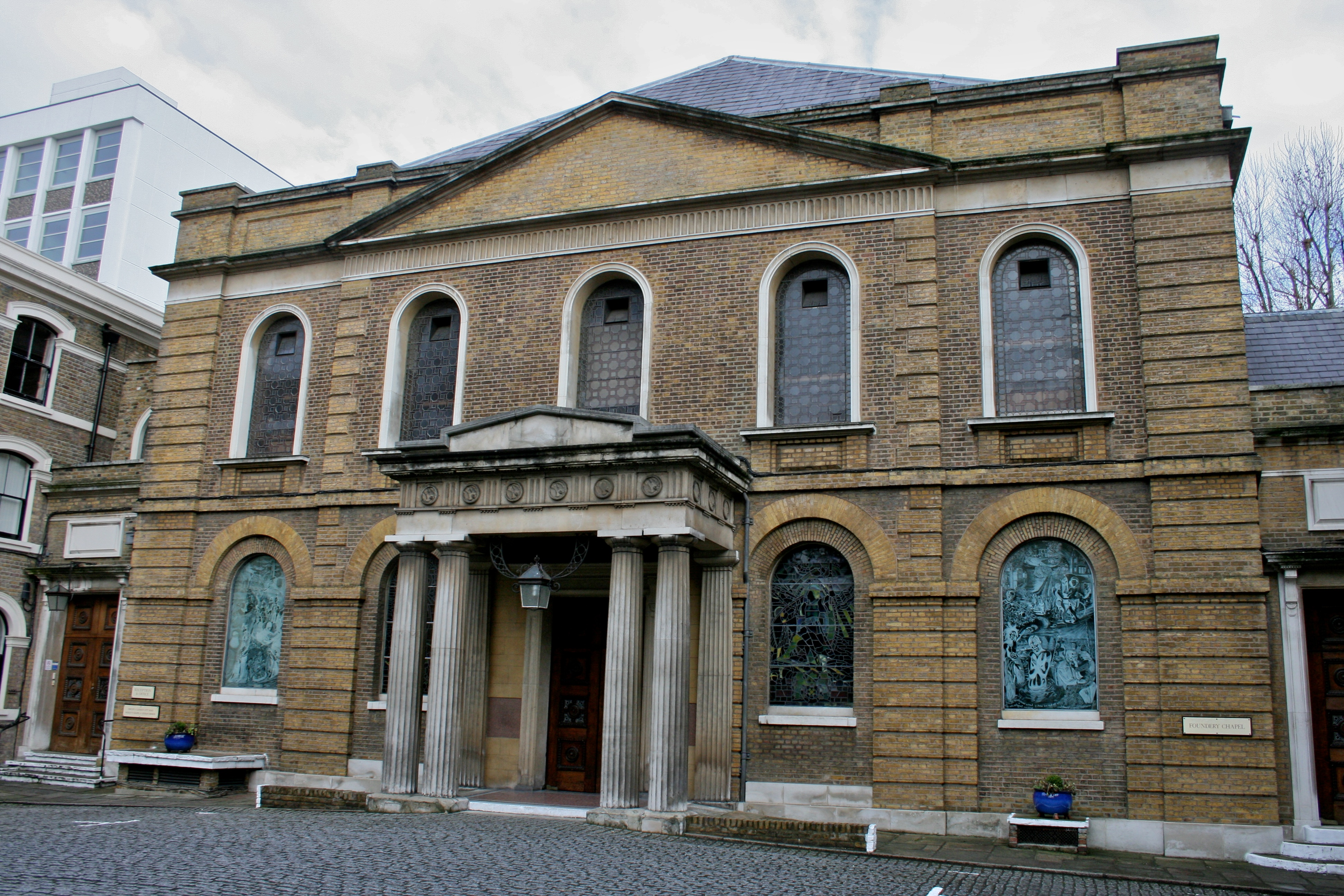
Wesley's Chapel

Church name	Location	Dedication	Web	Founded	Denomination	Notes
Highbury Quadrant Congregational Church	Highbury				Congregational	
Spanish Congregation of North London	Highbury				Evangelical	
Blessed Sacrament	Barnsbury				Roman Catholic	
Bunhill Fields Friends Meeting House	Bunhill Fields				Quakers	
Chapel of St John the Baptist	Finsbury Park				Latvian Orthodox	
Christ Church Highbury	Highbury				Anglican	
Claremont United Reformed Church	Pentonville		–		URC	
Harecourt United Reformed Church	Islington		–		URC	
New River Baptist Church	Essex Road				Baptist	
Our Lady of Czestochowa & St Casimir	Islington				Roman Catholic	Polish Church
Our Most Holy Redeemer	Exmouth Market				Anglican	
Sacred Heart of Jesus	Holloway				Roman Catholic	
St Anthony the Great & St John the Baptist	Holloway				Greek Orthodox	
St Gabriel	Upper Holloway				Roman Catholic	
St James	Clerkenwell				Anglican	
St James	Islington				Anglican	
St Joan of Arc	Highbury				Roman Catholic	
St John	Clerkenwell				Anglican	
St John the Evangelist	Islington				Roman Catholic	
St Joseph	Finsbury				Roman Catholic	
St Joseph and Padarn	Holloway				Roman Catholic	Served by Society of Saint Pius X and offering exclusively the traditional mass and sacraments
St Joseph	Highgate				Roman Catholic	served by the Passionist order
St Luke	Old Street, Finsbury					Deconsecrated
St Mary	Islington				Anglican	
St Mary Magdelene	Holloway		–		Anglican	
St Mellitus	Finsbury Park				Roman Catholic	
St Thomas the Apostle	Finsbury Park				Anglican	
SS Peter & Paul	Clerkenwell				Roman Catholic	
Union Chapel	Islington				Congregational	
Unity Church	Islington				Unitarian	
Wesley's Chapel	Clerkenwell				Methodist	
St Augustine's Church	Highbury					
King's Cross Baptist Church	King's Cross				Baptist	

=== Kensington and Chelsea ===
Church name	Location	Dedication	Web	Founded	Denomination	Notes
All Saints (Chelsea Old Church)	Chelsea	All Saints		C12th	Anglican	Restored 1958
St Mary Abbots	Kensington	Mary		1262	Anglican	Rebuilt 1370, c. 1700, 1872
St Luke, Chelsea	Chelsea	Luke		1820–1824	Anglican	Commissioners' church. Single parish with Christ Church
Holy Trinity, Brompton	Brompton	Trinity		1826–1829	Anglican	Founder of HTB church planting network
Holy Trinity & St Jude, Sloane Street	Chelsea	Trinity & Jude		1828–1830	Anglican	Rebuilt 1888–1890
Christ Church, Chelsea	Chelsea	Jesus		1839	Anglican	Single parish with St Luke's
St John, Notting Hill	Notting Hill	John the Evangelist		1844–1845	Anglican	
St James, Norlands	Notting Hill	James		1845	Anglican	
St Mary the Boltons	The Boltons	Mary		1849–1850	Anglican	
St Barnabas, Kensington	Kensington	Barnabas		1826-1829	Anglican	HTB church plant
St Peter, Notting Hill	Notting Hill	Peter		1855–1857	Anglican	
St Paul, Onslow Square	South Kensington	Paul		1860	Anglican	Redundant 1970s but reopened by HTB c. 1990
All Saints, Notting Hill	Notting Hill	All Saints		1852–1861	Anglican	Restored 1951
St George, Campden Hill	Kensington	George		1864	Anglican	
St Stephen, Gloucester Road	South Kensington	Stephen		1866–1867	Anglican	Bishop of Fulham
St Clement, Notting Dale	Notting Hill	Pope Clement I		1867	Anglican	United with St James Norlands
St Jude, Kensington	South Kensington	Jude		1867–1870	Anglican	Run directly by HTB. Now occupied by St Mellitus College
St Michael & All Angels, Ladbroke Grove	Ladbroke Grove	Michael & Angels		1870–1871	Anglican	
St John the Baptist, Holland Road	Kensington	John the Baptist		1872	Anglican	Rebuilt 1885–1910. United with St George Campden Hill 2006
St Luke, Redcliffe Gardens	Earls Court	Luke		1872–1873	Anglican	
St Augustine, Queen's Gate	Queen's Gate	Augustine of C		1868–1876	Anglican	Run directly by HTB since 2010
St Cuthbert, Earls Court	Earls Court	Cuthbert		1884–1887	Anglican	Bishop of Fulham
St Helen, North Kensington	North Kensington	Helena			Anglican	
St Mary, Cadogan Street	Chelsea	Mary		1812	Roman Catholic	Rebuilt 1877–1879
St Francis of Assisi, Notting Hill	Notting Hill	Francis of Assisi		1860	Roman Catholic	
Our Lady of Victories, Kensington	Kensington High St	Mary		1869	Roman Catholic	Pro-Cathedral 1869–1903. Rebuilt 1959 following Blitz
Our Lady of the Holy Souls, Kensal New Town	Kensal Town	Mary		1872	Roman Catholic	Current building 1880–1882
Our Lady of Dolours, Chelsea	Chelsea	Mary		1874–1875	Roman Catholic	served by the Servite Order
Immaculate Heart of Mary (Brompton Oratory)	Brompton	Imm Heart of Mary		1880–1884	Roman Catholic	served by the Oratory of Saint Philip Neri
Our Most Holy Redeemer & St Thomas More	Chelsea	Jesus & Thomas M		1894–1895	Roman Catholic	
St Pius X, St Charles Square	North Kensington	Pope Pius X		1908	Roman Catholic	Chapel to teacher training college until parished 1937
Our Lady of Mt Carmel & St Simon Stock	Kensington	Mary, Simon Stock		1954–1959	Roman Catholic	served by Carmelites
St John of Rila	Kensington	John of Rila			Bulgarian Orthodox	
St Sava	Ladbroke Grove	Sava			Serbian Orthodox	
St Mark	Kensington	Mark		1975	Coptic Orthodox	Building erected 1863 as St John's Presbyterian church
St Sarkis, Kensington	Kensington	Sarkis		1922–1923	Armenian Apostolic	
St Yeghiche, South Kensington	South Kensington	Yeghiche		1973	Armenian Apostolic	Building erected 1867 as St Peter's CoE church
Chelsea Methodist Church	Chelsea			1812	Methodist	Current building 1903, rebuilt 1983
Chelsea Community Church	Chelsea				URC	
Kensington United Reformed Church	Kensington			1854–1855	URC	Began as Kensington Congregational
Chelsea Community Baptist Church	Chelsea			1854	?	Rebuilt 1960
Fetter Lane Moravian Church	Chelsea			1742	Moravian Church	Rebuilt 1960s
St Columba, Knightsbridge	Knightsbridge	Columba		1884	Church of Scotland	Rebuilt 1950–1955
Kensington Temple	Kensington			1965	Elim	Building erected 1849 as Congregational chapel
Westbourne Grove Church	Westbourne Grove			1823	Salt and Light	Originally Baptist
RCCG – Faith Outreach Christian Centre	Kensington				RCCG	
The Church of Jesus Christ of Latter-day Saints Hyde Park Chapel	Brompton			1961	The Church of Jesus Christ of Latter-day Saints (Mormon)	

=== Kingston upon Thames ===
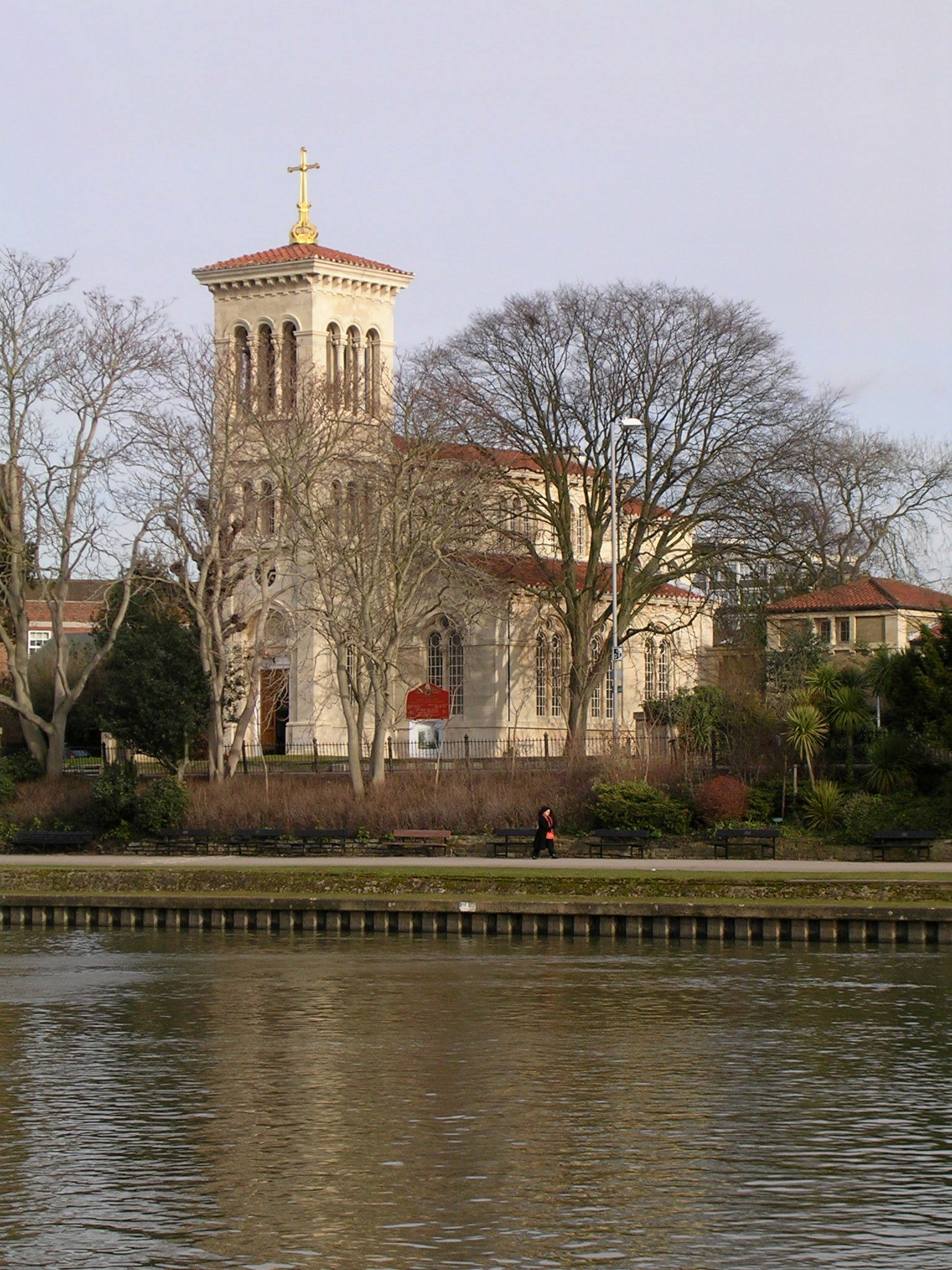
Surbiton's Roman Catholic church of Saint Raphael, which is Grade II* listed

Church name	Location	Dedication	Web	Founded	Denomination	Notes
All Saints	Kingston upon Thames				Anglican	
BFGC New Malden Church	New Malden				Pentecostal, Assemblies of God	
Christ Church	New Malden				Anglican	
Christ Church	Surbiton				Anglican	
Friends Meeting House	Kingston upon Thames				Quakers	
Kings Church Kingston	Kingston upon Thames				Evangelical, Newfrontiers	
Kingsgate Church	Kingston upon Thames					
Kingston upon Thames United Reformed Church	Kingston upon Thames		–		United Reformed Church	
Korean Church	New Malden					
New Malden Baptist Church	New Malden				Baptist Church	
New Malden United Reformed Church	New Malden				United Reformed Church	
Our Lady Immaculate	Tolworth				Roman Catholic	
St Agatha	Kingston upon Thames				Roman Catholic	
St Andrew	Surbiton				Anglican	
St Ann	Kingston Hill				Roman Catholic	
St Catherine of Siena	Chessington				Roman Catholic	
St George	Kingston upon Thames				Greek Orthodox	
St George	Tolworth				Anglican	
St James	New Malden				Anglican	
St John	Kingston upon Thames				Anglican	
St John the Baptist	Old Malden				Anglican	
St Joseph	New Malden				Roman Catholic	
St Luke	Kingston upon Thames				Anglican	
St Mark	Surbiton				Anglican	
St Mary the Virgin	Chessington				Anglican	
St Matthew	Surbiton				Anglican	
St Paul	Hook				Anglican	
St Peter	Norbiton				Anglican	
St Pius X	Norbiton				Roman Catholic (served by the Paulist Fathers)	
St Raphael	Surbiton				Roman Catholic	
Tolworth United Reformed Church	Tolworth		–		United Reformed Church	

=== Lambeth ===
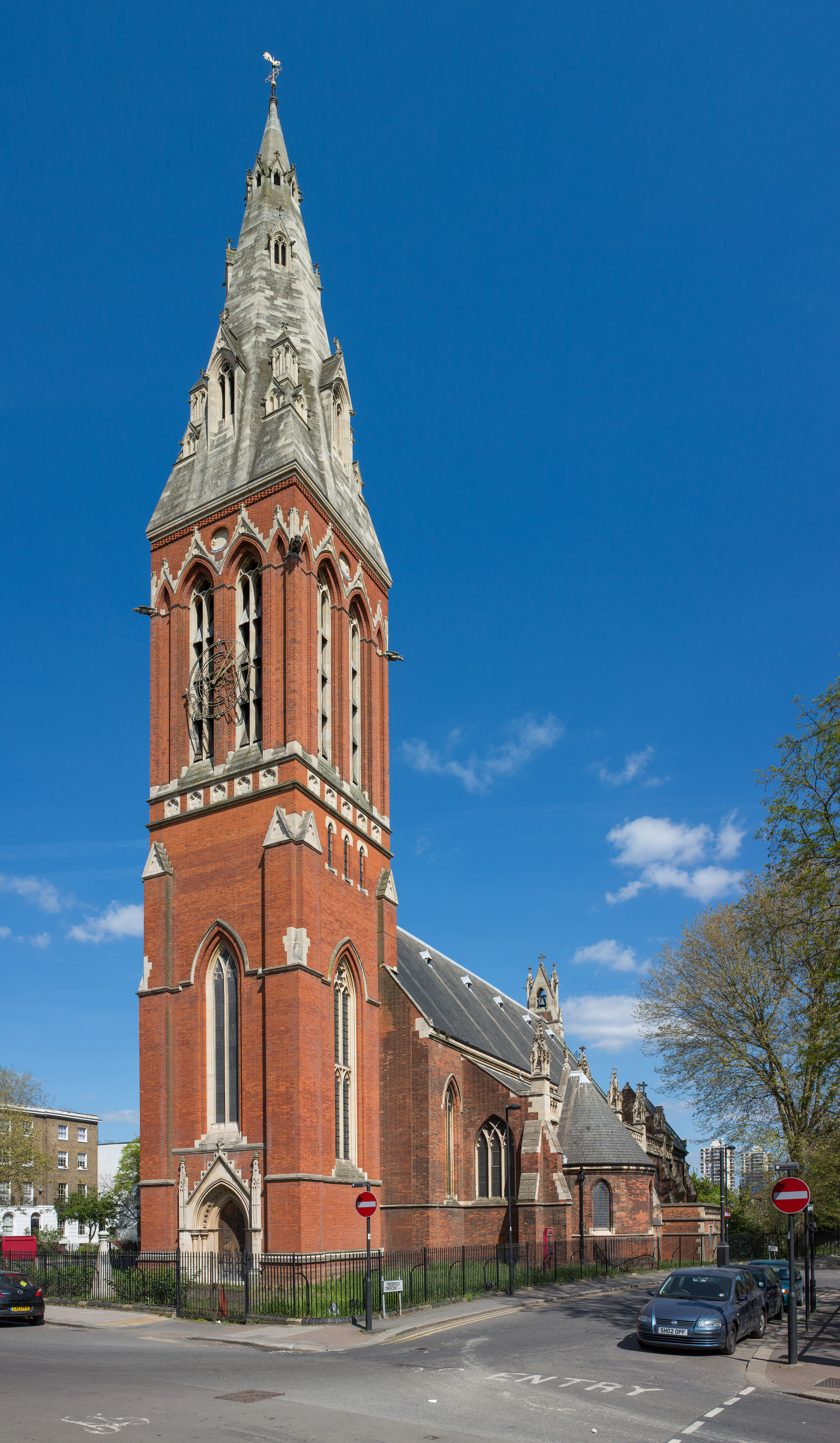
The Victorian Gothic Church of St John the Divine, Kennington

Church name	Location	Dedication	Web	Founded	Denomination	Notes
All Saints	West Dulwich				Anglican	
Brixton Hill United Reformed Church	Brixton Hill		–		URC	
Christ Church Brixton Road	North Brixton		–	1902	Anglican	
Christ Church & Upton Chapel	Lambeth				Baptist, United Reformed,	with Lincoln Memorial Tower; affiliated with Oasis Trust
Corpus Christi	Brixton Hill		–		Roman Catholic	
Effra Road Chapel	Brixton				Unitarian	
English Martyrs	Streatham		–		Roman Catholic	
Friends Meeting House	Streatham		–		Quakers	
Grace London	Waterloo		Grace London		Newfrontiers	
Holy Redeemer Italian Mission	Brixton		–		Roman Catholic	served by the Brothers of the Sacred Heart
Our Immaculate Lady of Victories	Clapham				Roman Catholic	served by the Congregation of the Most Holy Redeemer
Our Lady of the Rosary	Brixton				Roman Catholic	
St Anne	Vauxhall		–		Roman Catholic	served by the Order of Augustinian Recollects
St Bartholomew	Norbury		–		Roman Catholic	
St Bede	Clapham Park				Roman Catholic	including a Traditional Latin Mass community
St Francis de Sales & St Gertrude	Stockwell		–		Roman Catholic	
St John	Waterloo				Anglican	
St John the Divine	Kennington				Anglican	
St Leonard	Streatham		–		Anglican	
St Luke	West Norwood				Anglican	
St Mark	Kennington				Anglican	
St Matthew	Brixton				Anglican	
St Matthew	West Norwood		–		Roman Catholic	served by the Missionaries of St. Francis Xavier, Pilar
St Patrick's Priory	Waterloo				Roman Catholic	served by the Conventual Franciscans
St Peter's	Streatham			1866	Anglican	
St Thomas with St Stephen	Telford Park, Streatham		–		Anglican	
St Philip & St James	Herne Hill				Roman Catholic	
SS Constantine & Helen	Upper Norwood				Greek Orthodox	
SS Simon and Jude	Streatham Hill				Roman Catholic	
Stockwell Green United Reformed Church	Stockwell		–		URC	
Streatham United Reformed Church	Streatham				URC	

==== Defunct churches ====
Church name	Location	Dedication	Founded	Ended	Denomination	Notes
St Mary-at-Lambeth	Lambeth					Deconsecrated, now the Garden Museum

=== Lewisham ===
Church name	Location	Dedication	Web	Founded	Denomination	Notes
Annunciation & St Augustine	Beckenham				Roman Catholic	served by the Paulist Fathers
Assumption	Deptford				Roman Catholic	served by the Paulist Fathers
Christ Church	Catford		–		URC	
Church of the Good Shepherd	Lee				Anglican	
City of Faith Church	Chinbrook, Grove Park		–		Assemblies of God	
Friends Meeting House	Forest Hill				Quakers	
Good Shepherd	Downham		–		Roman Catholic	
Grove Centre Church	Sydenham				Baptist, URC	
Holy Cross	Catford				Roman Catholic	
Honor Oak Christian Fellowship Centre	Honor Oak				FIEC	
Jubilee International Church	Chinbrook, Grove Park				Assemblies of God	
King's Church	Catford				Newfrontiers	
Lee Green United Reformed Church	Lee Green		–		URC	
Lewisham High Street United Reformed Church	Lewisham		–		URC	
Living Word Christian Fellowship	Lee Green				Pentecostal	
Loampit Gospel Hall	Lewisham				non-denominational	
London International church of Christ	Lewisham					
Our Lady & St Philip Neri	Sydenham				Roman Catholic	
Our Lady of Lourdes	Lee				Roman Catholic	
Resurrection of Our Lord	Sydenham				Roman Catholic	
St Andrew	Brockley				URC	
St Bartholomew's	Sydenham				Anglican	
St Gregorios	Brockley				Malankara Orthodox Syrian	
St Mary Magdalen	Brockley		–		Roman Catholic	
St Michael	New Cross		–		URC	
St Paul	Deptford		–		Anglican	
St Peter's Brockley	Brockley				Anglican	
St Saviour's, Brockley Rise	Forest Hill				Anglican	
St Saviour & Saints John the Baptist and Evangelist	Lewisham				Roman Catholic	
St William of York	Forest Hill				Roman Catholic	
Trinity United Reformed Church	Catford		–		URC	

=== Merton ===
Church name	Location	Dedication	Web	Founded	Denomination	Notes
St Mary, Wimbledon	Wimbledon	Mary		C11th	Anglican	Parish of Wimbledon. Rebuilt C13th, 1780s, 1843
St Mark, Wimbledon	Wimbledon	Mark			Anglican	Parish of Wimbledon. Plant from St Mary, Wimbledon
St John, Wimbledon	Wimbledon	John			Anglican	Parish of Wimbledon. Plant from St Mary, Wimbledon
St Matthew, Wimbledon	Wimbledon	Matthew			Anglican	Parish of Wimbledon. Plant from St Mary, Wimbledon
Emmanuel, Wimbledon	Wimbledon			1879	Anglican	Parish of Wimbledon. Rebuilt 1888
St Luke, Wimbledon Park	Wimbledon Park	Luke		1908–1909	Anglican	Plant from Emmanuel, Wimbledon
Holy Trinity, South Wimbledon	Wimbledon Park	Holy Trinity		1872	Anglican	Built 1862
St Andrew, Wimbledon	Wimbledon	St Andrew		1883	Anglican	Plant from Holy Trinity, South Wimbledon. Rebuilt 1908–9
St Lawrence, Morden	Morden	Lawrence		1636	Anglican	Morden Parish. Probably replaced earlier building
St John's, Colliers Wood	Colliers Wood			c. 1994	Church of England (continuing)	
Christ the King, Wimbledon Park	Wimbledon Park	Jesus		1913	Roman Catholic	Building 1926–1928
Our Lady of the Assumption	Tooting				Roman Catholic	
Sacred Heart	Wimbledon				Roman Catholic	served by the Society of Jesus
Sacred Heart Mass Centre	New Malden		–		Roman Catholic	served by the Society of Jesus
St John Fisher	South Merton		–		Roman Catholic	
St Joseph	Colliers Wood				Roman Catholic	
St Michael	Pollards Hill		–		Roman Catholic	served by the Salvatorians
St Teresa of the Child Jesus	Morden				Roman Catholic	
St Winefride, South Wimbledon	South Wimbledon				Roman Catholic	
SS Peter & Paul	Mitcham				Roman Catholic	served by the Missionaries of St. Francis Xavier, Pilar
Morden Baptist Church	Morden			1885	Baptist Union	Building 1935
Dundonald Church	Raynes Park			1990	Co-Mission	Plant from Emmanuel, Wimbledon. Founder of Co-Mission planting network
Friends Meeting House	Wimbledon				Quakers	
Elim Pentecostal Church Mitcham	Mitcham				Elim	
Elim Wimbledon Church	Wimbledon				Elim	
Gospel Hall Mitcham Junction	Mitcham Junction				Gospel Hall	

=== Newham ===
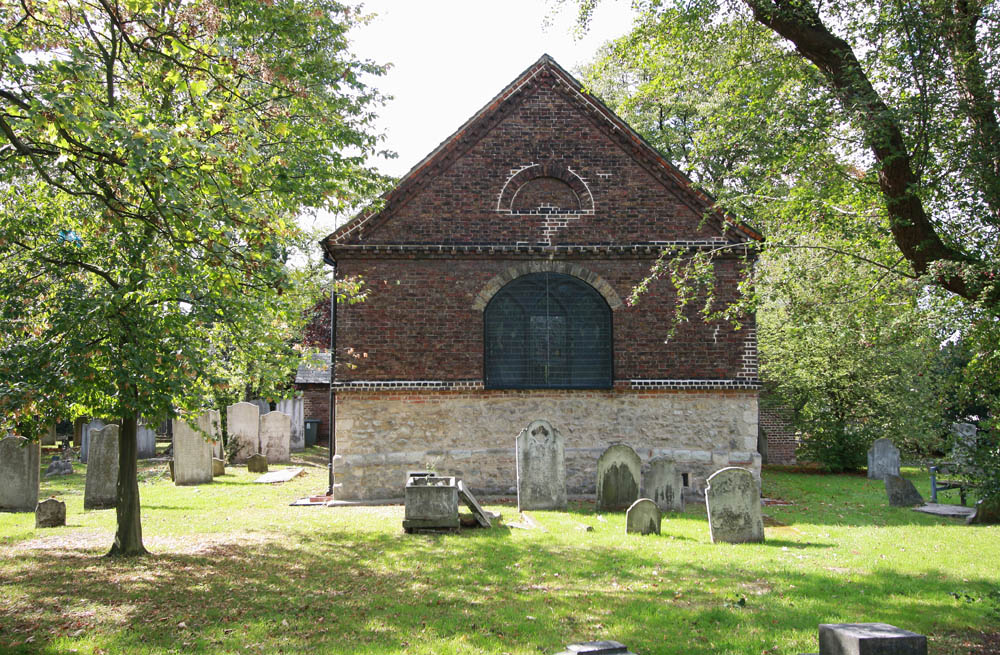
St Mary's Church, Little Ilford

Church name	Location	Dedication	Web	Founded	Denomination	Notes
All Saints (West Ham Parish Church)	West Ham				Anglican	
All Saints	Forest Gate		–		Anglican	
Ascension	Victoria Docks				Anglican	
Bonny Downs Baptist Church	East Ham				Baptist	
Bryant Street Methodist Church	Stratford				Methodist	
Central Baptist Church	Stratford				Baptist	
Christ Church, Newham	Plaistow				United Reformed Church	
Christadelphian Hall	East Ham				Christadelphianism	
City Chapel	Beckton				Evangelical, Evangelical Alliance	
Custom House Baptist Church	Custom House				Baptist	
East Ham Baptist Church	East Ham				Baptist	
Emmanuel	Forest Gate				Anglican	
Every Nation Church Stratford	Stratford				Evangelical	
Full Gospel Hall	East Ham				Pentecostal	
Harold Road Moravian Church	Stratford				Moravian	
Highway Church	Stratford				Evangelical	
Major Road Baptist Church	Stratford				Baptist	
Manor Park Christian Centre	Manor Park				Evangelical, Evangelical Alliance	
Our Lady of Compassion	Upton Park		–		Roman Catholic	
Shalom United Reformed Church	Manor Park		–		United Reformed Church	
St Alban	Upton Park				Anglican	
St Anne	Custom House				Roman Catholic	
St Antony of Padua	Forest Gate				Roman Catholic	
St Barnabas	Manor Park				Anglican	
St Bartholomew	East Ham				Anglican	
St Edmund	Forest Gate				Anglican	
St Francis of Assisi	Stratford		–		Roman Catholic	
St George & St Ethelbert	East Ham				Anglican	
St John The Evangelist	North Woolwich		–		Anglican	
St John The Evangelist	Stratford				Anglican	
St Lazarus and St Andrew the Apostle	Forest Gate		–		Greek Orthodox	
St Luke	Victoria Docks				Anglican	
St Margaret & All Saints	Canning Town				Roman Catholic	
St Margaret Convent Chapel	Canning Town		–		Roman Catholic	
St Mark	Beckton				Anglican	
St Mark	Forest Gate				Anglican	
St Mark's Ecumenical Church and Community Centre	Beckton				Ecumenical use building, Church of England, Roman Catholic	
St Martin	Plaistow				Anglican	
St Mary & St Edward with St John	Silvertown				Roman Catholic, also used by Church of England	
St Mary Magdalene	East Ham				Anglican	
St Mary the Virgin	Little Ilford				Anglican	
St Mary	Plaistow				Anglican	
St Matthew	West Ham				Anglican	
St Matthias	Canning Town				Anglican	
St Michael & All Angels	Manor Park				Anglican	
St Michael	East Ham				Roman Catholic	
St Nicholas	Manor Park				Roman Catholic	
St Paul	East Ham				Anglican	
St Paul & St James	Stratford				Anglican	
St Philip & St James	Plaistow				Anglican	
St Saviour	Forest Gate				Anglican	
St Stephen	Manor Park				Roman Catholic	
Stratford Unitarian & Free Christian Church	Stratford				Unitarian	

=== Redbridge ===
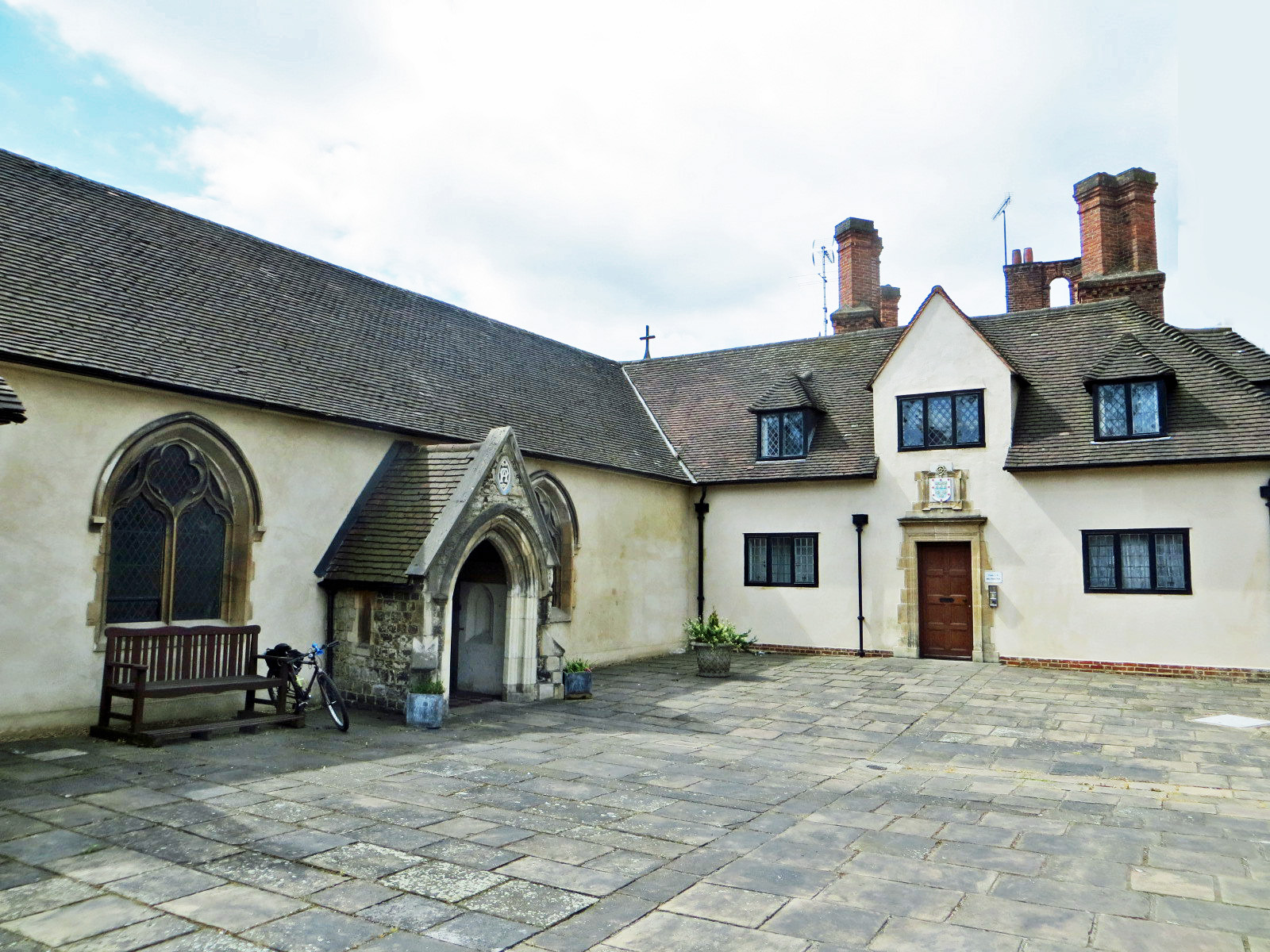
Ilford Hospital Chapel

Church name	Location	Dedication	Web	Founded	Denomination	Notes
All Nations Church	Ilford				International Presbyterian Church	
All Saints	Goodmayes				Anglican	
All Saints	Woodford Wells		–		Anglican	
Assumption	Hainault				Roman Catholic	
Christ Church	Wanstead		–		Anglican	
City Gates	Ilford				Elim Pentecostal	
Fairlop Evangelical Church	Barkingside		–		Evangelical	
Friends Meeting House	Wanstead		–		Quakers	
Grace Church	Goodmayes		–		Newfrontiers	
Hainault Baptist Church	Hainault		–		Baptist	
Hainault Evangelical Church	Hainault				non-denominational	
Holy Trinity	Barkingside		–		Anglican	
Holy Trinity	South Woodford		–		Anglican	
Ilford High Road Baptist	Ilford		–		Baptist	
Ilford Hospital Chapel	Ilford		–		Anglican	
Jubilee Church Ilford	Ilford				Newfrontiers	
Our Lady of Lourdes	Wanstead				Roman Catholic	
London International church of Christ	Redbridge				Intl church of Christ	
St Alban	Ilford		–		Anglican	
St Andrew	Ilford		–		Anglican	
St Andrew	Woodford Wells		–		Anglican	
St Anne Line	South Woodford		–		Roman Catholic	
St Augustine of Canterbury	Barkingside				Roman Catholic	
St Barnabas	Woodford Green		–		Anglican	
St Bede	Chadwell Heath				Roman Catholic	
St Cedd	Barkingside		–		Anglican	
St Cedd	Goodmayes		–		Roman Catholic	
St Clement	Ilford		–		Anglican	
St Francis of Assisi	Barkingside				Anglican	
St Gabriel	Aldersbrook		–		Anglican	
St George	Barkingside		–		Anglican	
St John the Baptist	Cranbrook		–		Roman Catholic	
St John the Evangelist	Ilford		–		Anglican	
St John Vianney	Clayhall		–		Roman Catholic	
St Laurence	Becontree		–		Anglican	
St Luke	Ilford		–		Anglican	
St Margaret of Antioch	Ilford		–		Anglican	
St Mary	Ilford				Anglican	
St Mary	South Woodford		–		Anglican	
St Mary	Wanstead		–		Anglican	
St Mary & St Erconwald	Ilford		–		Anglican	
St Paul	Goodmayes		–		Anglican	Foundation stone 1903 by Lady Florence Cecil; Architect was Chancellor and son.
St Paul	Hainault		–		Anglican	
St Paul	Woodford Bridge		–		Anglican	
St Peter	Aldborough Hatch		–		Anglican	
St Teresa	Newbury Park		–		Roman Catholic	
St Thomas of Canterbury	Woodford Green				Roman Catholic	
SS Peter & Paul	Ilford		-		Roman Catholic	
The Bridge Church	Woodford				Assemblies of God	
The Drive Methodist Church	Ilford		–		Methodist	
Tree of Life Fellowship	Barkingside				non-denominational	

=== Richmond upon Thames ===
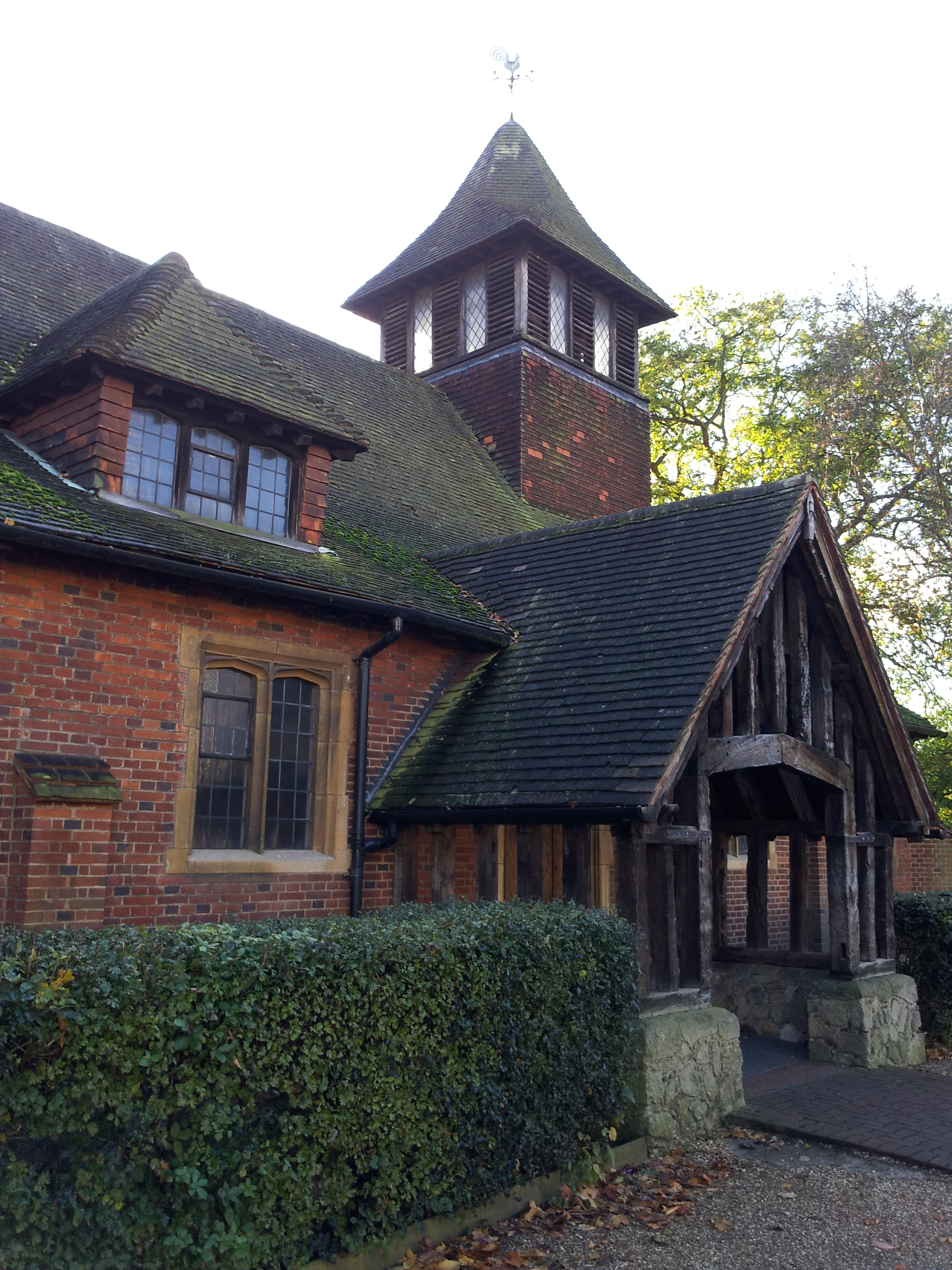
The Barn Church, Kew, the first barn church to be consecrated in England

Church name	Location	Dedication	Web	Founded	Denomination	Notes
St Mary, Barnes	Barnes	Mary		12th century	Anglican	Barnes Team Ministry. The building is Grade II* listed.
St Mary Magdalene, Richmond	Richmond	Mary Magdalene		13th century	Anglican	Rebuilt c. 1500, mostly rebuilt 1903. Richmond Team Ministry
St Mary with St Alban, Teddington	Teddington	Mary & Alban		13th century	Anglican	Teddington Parish. Rebuilt C16th. St Mary's only until St Alban's closed
St Mary, Hampton	Hampton	Mary		Medieval	Anglican	Rebuilt 1830–1831
St Mary, Twickenham	Twickenham	Mary		Medieval	Anglican	Rebuilt 1714
St Peter, Petersham	Petersham	Peter		Medieval	Anglican	Rebuilt 1505
St Mary the Virgin, Mortlake	Mortlake	Mary		1348	Anglican	Mortlake Parish. Rebuilt 1543
St Anne, Kew	Kew	Anne		1714	Anglican	
St John, Hampton Wick	Hampton Wick	John?		1829–1830	Anglican	
St Andrew, Ham	Ham	Andrew		1830–1831	Anglican	German Lutheran church also uses the building
St Francis, Hickey's Almshouses	Richmond	Francis of Assisi		1834	Anglican	
St John the Divine, Richmond	Richmond	John the Evangelist		1831–1836	Anglican	Richmond Team Ministry
Holy Trinity, Twickenham	Twickenham	Trinity		1841	Anglican	
St Matthias, Richmond	Richmond	Matthias		1857	Anglican	Richmond Team Ministry
SS Philip & James, Whitton	Whitton	Philip the Apostle & James the Less		1862	Anglican	The church building was constructed in 1862 when Whitton separated become a separate parish
St James, Hampton Hill	Hampton Hill	James		1863	Anglican	
Christ Church, East Sheen	East Sheen	Jesus		1862–1864	Anglican	Mortlake Parish
SS Peter & Paul, Teddington	Teddington	Peter & Paul		1865	Anglican	Teddington Parish. Rebuilt 1970s
St Michael and All Angels, Barnes	Barnes	Michael & Angels		1867	Anglican	Barnes Team Ministry. Building 1878, rebuilt 1891–1893
Holy Trinity, Barnes	Barnes	Trinity		1868	Anglican	Barnes Team Ministry
Holy Trinity, Richmond	Richmond	Trinity		1870	Anglican	
St Stephen, Twickenham	Twickenham	Stephen		1874	Anglican	
St Mark, Teddington	Teddington	Mark		1875	Anglican	Rebuilt 1888, 1915, 1939
St Luke, Kew	Kew	Luke		c. 1880	Anglican	Permanent building 1889
St Philip & All Saints (The Barn Church)	Kew	Philip & All Saints		1910	Anglican	Current building (converted barn) 1928–1929
St Michael, Fulwell	Fulwell	Michael		1913	Anglican / Co-Mission	Part of Co-Mission. Redundant 2006 but re-planted 2015
All Hallows, Twickenham	Twickenham	All Saints		1914	Anglican	The church's tower and porch and the furnishings of the current 1939–1940 building came from All Hallows Lombard Street, designed by Sir Christopher Wren and built in 1694.
All Saints, East Sheen	East Sheen	All Saints		1928–1929	Anglican	Mortlake Parish
All Saints, Hampton	Hampton	All Saints		1929	Anglican	
St Augustine of Canterbury, Whitton	Whitton	Augustine of C'bury		1935	Anglican	Building 1958
St Richard, Ham	Ham	Richard of Chichester		1964	Anglican	
All Saints, Twickenham	Twickenham	All Saints			Anglican	As a traditionalist Anglo-Catholic church, the parish receives alternative episcopal oversight from the Bishop of Fulham.
All Souls, St Margarets	St Margarets	All Souls			Anglican	
St Elizabeth of Portugal, Richmond	Richmond	Elizabeth of Aragon		1790s	Roman Catholic	Current building 1824
St Mary Magdalen, Mortlake	Mortlake	Mary Magdalene		1846	Roman Catholic	Building 1852
Sacred Heart, Teddington	Teddington	Sacred Heart		1882	Roman Catholic	Building 1893
St James, Twickenham	Twickenham	James		1885	Roman Catholic	
St Theodore of Canterbury, Hampton	Hampton	Theodore of Tarsus		1897	Roman Catholic	First building 1927, rebuilt 1987
Our Lady of Loreto & St Winefride, Kew	Kew	Mary & Winifred		1898	Roman Catholic	Building 1905
St Francis de Sales, Hampton Hill	Hampton Hill	Francis de Sales		1920	Roman Catholic	Building 1928, rebuilt 1966. Served by Mission of St Francis de Sales
St Margaret of Scotland, St Margarets	St Margarets	Margaret of Scotland		1930	Roman Catholic	Building 1937, rebuilt 1969
St Edmund of Canterbury, Whitton	Whitton	Edmund of Abingdon		1934	Roman Catholic	Building 1935, rebuilt 1961–1963
St Thomas Aquinas, Ham	Ham	Thomas Aquinas		1952	Roman Catholic	Current building 1974 (was previously a school)
Our Lady Queen of Peace, Richmond	Richmond	Mary		1953–1954	Roman Catholic	
St Osmund, Barnes	Barnes	Osmund		1956–1958	Roman Catholic	
Barnes Baptist Church	Barnes			1866	Baptist	Current building 1934
East Sheen Baptist Church	East Sheen				Baptist	
Hampton Baptist Church	Hampton			1992	Baptist Union	Planted from Teddington Baptist
Ham Christian Centre	Ham			1928	Baptist Union	
Teddington Baptist Church	Teddington			1881	Baptist	Building 1895, rebuilt 1956
Whitton Baptist Church	Whitton			1881	Baptist	Rebuilt in Whitton 1935
Barnes Methodist Church	Barnes			1868	Methodist	Current building 1906. Richmond & Hounslow Circuit
Teddington Methodist Church	Teddington			1859	Methodist	Rebuilt 1879, 1952
Hampton Methodist Church	Hampton			1861	Methodist	Rebuilt 1926, 1963
Whitton Methodist Church	Whitton			1938	Methodist	Richmond & Hounslow Circuit
Raleigh Road United Church	Richmond			1868	Methodist / URC	Methodist (rebuilt 1937) & URC (1898, reb. 1956) united 1995
Twickenham United Reformed Church	Twickenham			c. 1835	URC	Building 1844. Originally Congregational
Hampton Hill United Reformed Church	Hampton Hill			1867	URC	Originally Congregational
Teddington Salvation Army	Teddington				Salvation Army	
Twickenham Salvation Army	Twickenham				Salvation Army	
Life Church, Richmond	Richmond				CF / Newground	Building 1831, rebuilt 1851. 2013 merger of two churches
Christ Church Teddington	Teddington			1864	EFCC	
Free Grace Baptist Church, Twickenham	Twickenham			1965	Grace Baptist SE	
Amyand Park Chapel	Twickenham			1888	FIEC	Current building 1952
Ebenezer Strict Baptist Chapel, Richmond	Richmond			1829	Strict Baptist	
Richmond Quaker Meeting House	Richmond				Quakers	
Parkside Community Church	East Sheen				Elim Pentecostal	
Church of the Living God	Twickenham			1989	Independent	The church meets at Orleans Park School.
Bethlehem Chapel, Richmond	Richmond			1797	Independent	The small one-storey stuccoed building is Grade II* listed. It still has its original galleried interior with pews and pulpit.
Christian Fellowship in Richmond	Richmond			1951	Independent	The congregation meets at Halford House, a Grade II listed former manor house, the earliest parts of which date from 1710. It was purchased by the Christian Fellowship in Richmond in 1954.
Duke Street Church, Richmond	Richmond			1870	Independent	Building 1881, rebuilt 1962

==== Defunct churches ====
Church name	Location	Dedication	Founded	Ended	Denomination	Notes
former church of All Saints	Petersham	All Saints	1899	1986; sold c.1996	Anglican	Built 1899–1909. It is Grade II listed and is now used as a private residence.
former Christ Church	Richmond	Jesus Christ	1864	1986	Anglican	The church closed in 1986, the congregation having merged with that of Holy Trinity Church, Sheen Park, Richmond, in 1977. The building has been converted into 15 residential flats.
former Kew Baptist Church	Kew		1861	2020	GBSE / Co-Mission	The congregation began in Richmond Green. It was revitalised in the 2010s by Co-Mission but closed in 2020. The building has now been converted for use as a children's swimming pool.
former Richmond Green United Reformed	Richmond		1877	URC		The church's building on Little Green (opened in 1885 and closed in 2006) has been converted into residential flats. Its subsequent building on Quadrant Road, opened in 2006 and closed in 2015, is now a Council library building.
former church of St Alban	Teddington	Saint Alban	1887	1977	Anglican	The building, which is Grade II* listed, is still owned by the Church of England but is now leased to the Landmark Arts Centre for use as a venue for concerts and exhibitions.
former Twickenham Methodist Church	Twickenham		1880	2016	Methodist	Current building 1899

=== Southwark ===
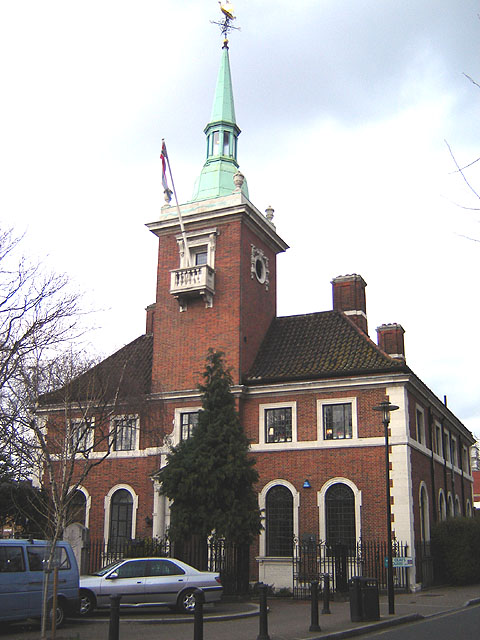
St Olav's, The Norwegian Church in London

Church name	Location	Dedication	Web	Founded	Denomination	Notes
All Saints	Peckham				Anglican	
former All Saints	Rotherhithe				Anglican	Demolished in 1952
Bermondsey Gospel Hall	Bermondsey		–			
Borough Welsh Congregational Chapel	Borough				Welsh Congregational	
Cross and Star Church	Elephant and Castle		–	1888	Brotherhood of the Cross and Star	Former Welsh Congregational
Camberwell Green United Reformed Church	Camberwell		–		URC	
Canada Water Church	Rotherhithe				Presbyterian	
Christ Church	East Dulwich		–		URC	
Christ Church	Southwark			1957	Anglican	Patron – Trustees of Marshall's Charity
Copleston Centre Church	Peckham			1880	Anglican / URC	Joint space of C of E and URC.
Crossway United Reformed Church	Elephant and Castle				URC	
Dulwich Grove United Reformed Church	East Dulwich				URC	
English Martyrs' Priory	Walworth				Roman Catholic	served by the Carmelites
Finnish Church and Seamen's Mission	Rotherhithe		–		Lutheran	
Friends Meeting House	Peckham		–		Quakers	
Grove Chapel	Camberwell		–		Reformed Evangelical	
Haddon Hall Baptist Church	Southwark		–		Baptist	
Heaton Road Church (The Gospel Hall)	Peckham		–		non-denominational	
Herne Hill United Reformed Church	Herne Hill		–		URC	
Loughborough Gospel Hall	Camberwell		–		non-denominational	
Metropolitan Cathedral of St George	Southwark				Roman Catholic	
Metropolitan Tabernacle	Elephant and Castle				Reformed Baptist	
Most Holy Trinity	Bermondsey				Roman Catholic	
Nativity of the Mother of God	Camberwell				Greek Orthodox	
Our Lady of La Salette & St Joseph	Bermondsey		–		Roman Catholic	
Our Lady of Sorrows	Peckham				Roman Catholic	
Our Lady of the Immaculate Conception	Rotherhithe				Roman Catholic	
Precious Blood	Borough		–		Roman Catholic	served by the Salvatorians
Sacred Heart	Camberwell				Roman Catholic	
St George the Martyr	Southwark				Anglican	
St Gertrude	South Bermondsey		–		Roman Catholic	
St Giles	Camberwell			1844	Anglican	
St James	Bermondsey			1827	Anglican	
St James the Great	Peckham Rye		–		Roman Catholic	
St John the Evangelist	East Dulwich			1865	Anglican	Partially rebuilt in 1951 following enemy action
St John Horsleydown (only plinth remaining)	Bermondsey		–		Anglican	
St Luke Peckham	Camberwell			1953	Anglican	
St Margaret Clitherow	Dulwich Wood		–		Roman Catholic	
St Mary Magdalen	Bermondsey			1675–79	Anglican	
St Mary	Rotherhithe			1714	Anglican	
St Olav's Norwegian Church	Rotherhithe		1927		Lutheran	
St Peter	Walworth				Anglican	
St Peter & the Guardian Angels	Rotherhithe		–		Roman Catholic	
St Stephen	South Dulwich			1868	Anglican	
St Thomas	Southwark		–		Anglican	
St Thomas More	Dulwich		–		Roman Catholic	
St Thomas the Apostle	Nunhead		-		Roman Catholic	
St Wilfrid	Kennington Park		–		Roman Catholic	
Southwark Cathedral (St Saviour & St Mary Overie)	Southwark	c.606		1212	Anglican	
The Globe Church	Southwark			2015	FIEC / Co-Mission	Meets in Guy's Campus
The Wellspring Community	Peckham	2015		2015	New Monastic Community	Meets at St Luke's North Peckham and Copleston Church West Peckham

=== Sutton ===
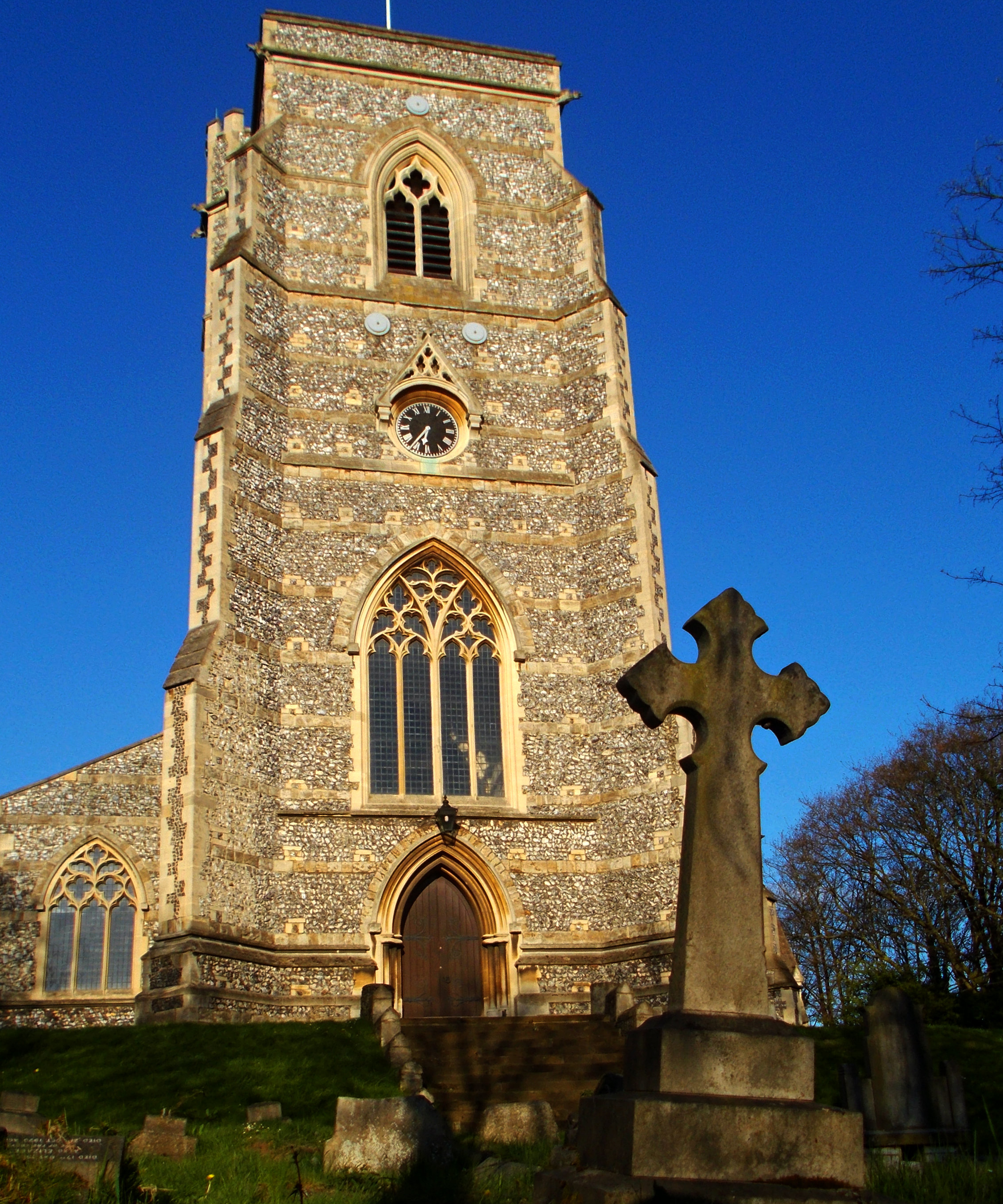
All Saints Benhilton

Church name	Location	Dedication	Web	Founded	Denomination	Notes
All Saints	Benhilton				Anglican	
All Saints	Hackbridge				Anglican	
All Saints	Carshalton				Anglican	
Carshalton Beeches Baptist Free Church	Carshalton				Baptist	
Carshalton Methodist Church	Carshalton				Methodist	
Christ Church	Sutton		–		Anglican	
Friends Meeting House	Sutton		–		Quakers	
Holy Cross	Carshalton				Roman Catholic	
Holy Family	Sutton Green				Roman Catholic	
Holy Trinity	Wallington				Anglican	
London International Church of Christ	Sutton				International church of Christ	
Our Lady of the Rosary	Sutton				Roman Catholic	
St Alban	Cheam				Anglican	
St Andrew	Cheam				United Reformed	
St Barnabas	Sutton				Anglican	
St Cecilia	North Cheam				Roman Catholic	
St Christopher	Cheam				Roman Catholic	
St Dunstan	Cheam				Anglican	
St Elphege	Wallington				Roman Catholic	
St Elphege's School Chapel	Roundshaw		–		Roman Catholic	
St John the Baptist	Belmont				Anglican and Methodist	
St Margaret	Carshalton				Roman Catholic	
St Mary	Beddington				Anglican	
St Matthias	Worcester Park				Roman Catholic	
St Michael and All Angels	South Beddington				Anglican	
St Nicholas	Sutton		–		Anglican	
St Patrick	Wallington				Anglican	
St Paul	Roundshaw				Anglican	
Sts Raphael & Basil the Great	Sutton		–		Greek Orthodox	
Sutton Baptist Church	Sutton				Baptist	
Trinity Church	Sutton				United Reformed and Methodist	
Wallington Baptist Church	Wallington				Baptist	
Wallington Methodist Church	Wallington				Methodist	

=== Tower Hamlets ===
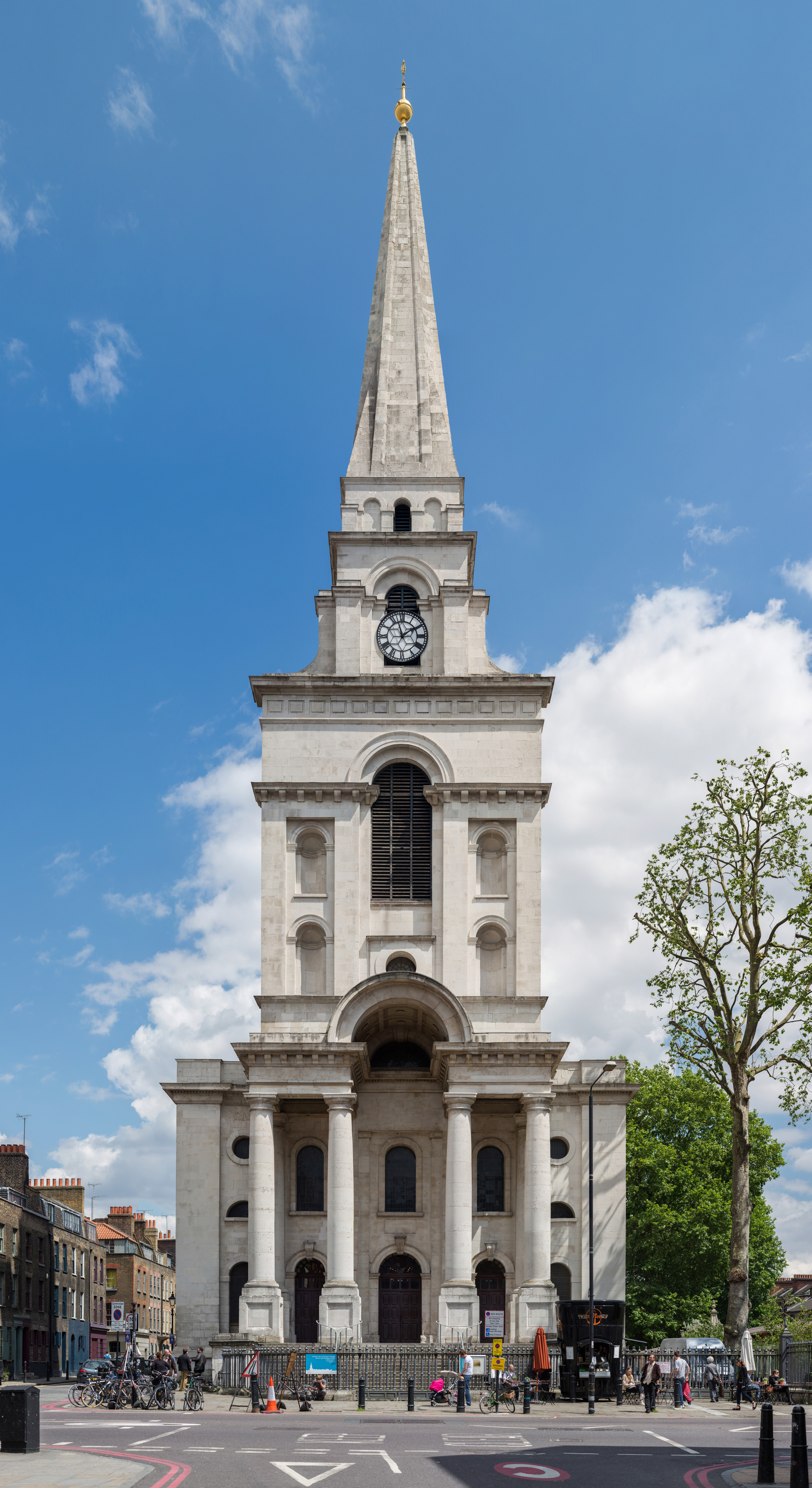
Christ Church, Spitalfields

Church name	Location	Dedication	Web	Founded	Denomination	Notes
All Hallows, Bow	Bow				Anglican	
All Saints	Poplar				Anglican	
Bethnal Green Meeting House	Bethnal Green		–		URC	
Bethnal Green Methodist Church	Bethnal Green				Methodist	
Bow Road Methodist Church	Bow				Methodist	
Bromley-by-Bow United Reformed Church	Bromley-by-Bow				URC	
Christ Church	Spitalfields				Anglican	
East London Tabernacle	Mile End				Baptist	
English Martyrs	Tower Hill				Roman Catholic	served by the Missionary Oblates of Mary Immaculate
Guardian Angels	Mile End				Roman Catholic	
Great Light Connections	Canary Wharf				RCCG	
Holy Name & Our Lady of the Sacred Heart	Bow				Roman Catholic	
Old Ford Methodist Church	Old Ford				Methodist	
Our Lady & St Catherine of Siena	Bow				Roman Catholic	
Our Lady Immaculate	Limehouse				Roman Catholic	
Our Lady of the Assumption Priory	Bethnal Green				Roman Catholic	served by the Assumptionists
Poplar Methodist Church	Poplar				Methodist	
Ratcliff Friends Meeting House	Bethnal Green		–		Quakers	
Simple Churches in East London	Poplar, Isle of Dogs		–		Simple Church	
St Anne	Limehouse				Anglican	
St Anne	Whitechapel				Roman Catholic	
St Barnabas Bethnal Green	Bow				Anglican	
St Boniface's German Church	Whitechapel				Roman Catholic	German church
St. Casimir's Lithuanian Church	Bethnal Green				Roman Catholic	Lithuanian church
St Dunstan	Stepney				Anglican	
St Edmund	Millwall				Roman Catholic	
St George's German Lutheran Church	Whitechapel		–	1762–1995	Lutheran	Oldest surviving German Lutheran church in the UK
St George in the East	Wapping		–		Anglican	
St Mary & Holy Trinity (Bow Church)	Bow		–		Anglican	
St James-the-Less	Bethnal Green		website		Anglican	
St John on Bethnal Green	Bethnal Green				Anglican	
St John's Chapel	Tower of London				Anglican	1080; oldest church structure in London
St Mary & St Joseph	Poplar				Roman Catholic	
St Mary & St Michael	Shadwell				Roman Catholic	
St Matthew	Bethnal Green				Anglican	
St Matthias Old Church	Poplar		–		Anglican	
St Nicholas	Poplar				Anglican	
St Patrick	Wapping				Roman Catholic	
St Paul	Cubitt Town		–		URC	
St Paul	Shadwell				Anglican	
St Paul's Bow Common	Bow				Anglican	
St Paul Old Ford	Bow				Anglican	
St. Peter's Barge	Canary Wharf				Anglican	Evangelical, plant from St Helen's Bishopsgate
St Peter ad Vincula	Tower of London				Anglican	Royal peculiar
St Peter's Bethnal Green	Bethnal Green				Anglican	
St Peter's London Docks	Wapping				Anglican	
Stepney Meeting House	Stepney				URC	
Tower Hamlets Community Church	Bow				Assemblies of God	
Trinity Independent Chapel	Poplar		–		Methodist	(formerly Congregational)
Whitechapel Mission	Whitechapel				Methodist	
Zoar Chapel	Whitechapel				Free Presbyterian Church of Scotland	

=== Waltham Forest ===
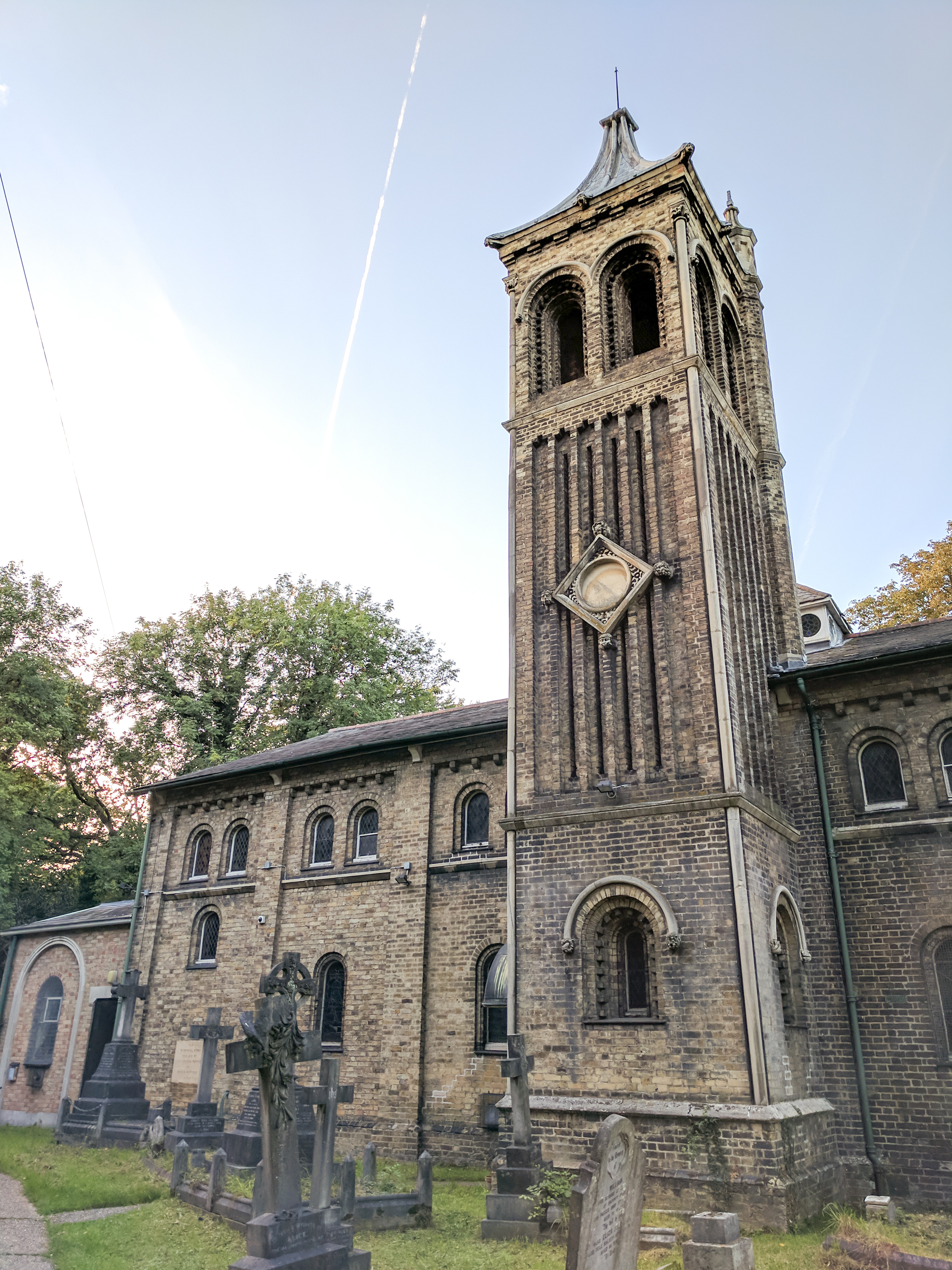
St Peter-in-the-Forest, Walthamstow

Church name	Location	Dedication	Web	Founded	Denomination	Notes
All Saints	Chingford	All Saints Day		before 1181	Anglican	Grade II* listed
All Saints	Highams Park		–		Anglican	
All Saints	Leyton		–		Anglican	
Chingford United Reformed Church	Chingford			1888	URC	Grade II listed
Christ Church	Leyton				Anglican	
Christ the King	Chingford		–		Roman Catholic	
Congregational Church	Chingford				Congregational	
Emmanuel	Leyton			1902	Anglican	Grade II listed
Grange Park United Reformed Church	Leyton				URC	
Highams Park United Reformed Church	Highams Park		–			
Holy Trinity & St Augustine of Hippo	Leytonstone				Anglican	also used by Roman Catholic and Pentecostal
Kingsway International Christian Centre	Walthamstow					
Leytonstone United Free Church	Leytonstone				Baptist / URC	
Lighthouse Methodist Church	Walthamstow			1893	Methodist	Grade II listed
North Chingford Methodist Church	Chingford				Methodist	
Our Lady & St George	Walthamstow				Roman Catholic	
Our Lady of Grace and St Teresa of Avila	Chingford		–		Roman Catholic	Grade II listed
Our Lady of the Rosary & St Patrick	Walthamstow		–		Roman Catholic	
Potter's House	Leytonstone		–		Potter's House	
Potter's House	Walthamstow		–		Potter's House	
St Andrew	Leytonstone			1882	Anglican	Grade II listed
St Andrew's Christian Centre	Walthamstow		–		Anglican	
St Anne	Chingford		–		Anglican	
St Barnabas	Walthamstow				Anglican	Grade II listed
The Cornerstone	Leyton				Anglican	
St Edmund	Chingford		–		Anglican	
SS Eleutherius, Anthia & Luke the Evangelist	Leyton				Greek Orthodox	
St Francis	Chingford		–		Anglican	
St Gabriel	Walthamstow		–		Anglican	
St John	Walthamstow		–		Anglican	
St John the Baptist, Leytonstone	Leytonstone			1833	Anglican	Grade II Listed
St Joseph	Leyton				Roman Catholic	
St Luke	Walthamstow		–		Anglican	
St Margaret with St Columba	Leytonstone		–		Anglican	
St Mary the Virgin	Walthamstow		–		Anglican	
St Mary with St Edward & St Luke	Leyton		–	before 1200	Anglican	Grade II* listed
St Michael & All Angels	Walthamstow		–		Anglican	Grade II listed
St Peter & St Paul	Chingford				Anglican	Grade II listed
St Peter-in-the-Forest	Walthamstow		–		Anglican	Grade II listed
St Saviour	Walthamstow		–		Anglican	
St Stephen	Walthamstow		–		Anglican	
South Grove Free Presbyterian Church	Walthamstow				Free Presbyterian Church of Ulster	the church's only London building
Trinity Walthamstow URC	Walthamstow				URC	
United Free Church	Leytonstone				URC	
Walthamstow Meeting House	Walthamstow		–		Quakers	
Walthamstow U. R. Asian Christian Church	Leyton				URC	

=== Wandsworth ===
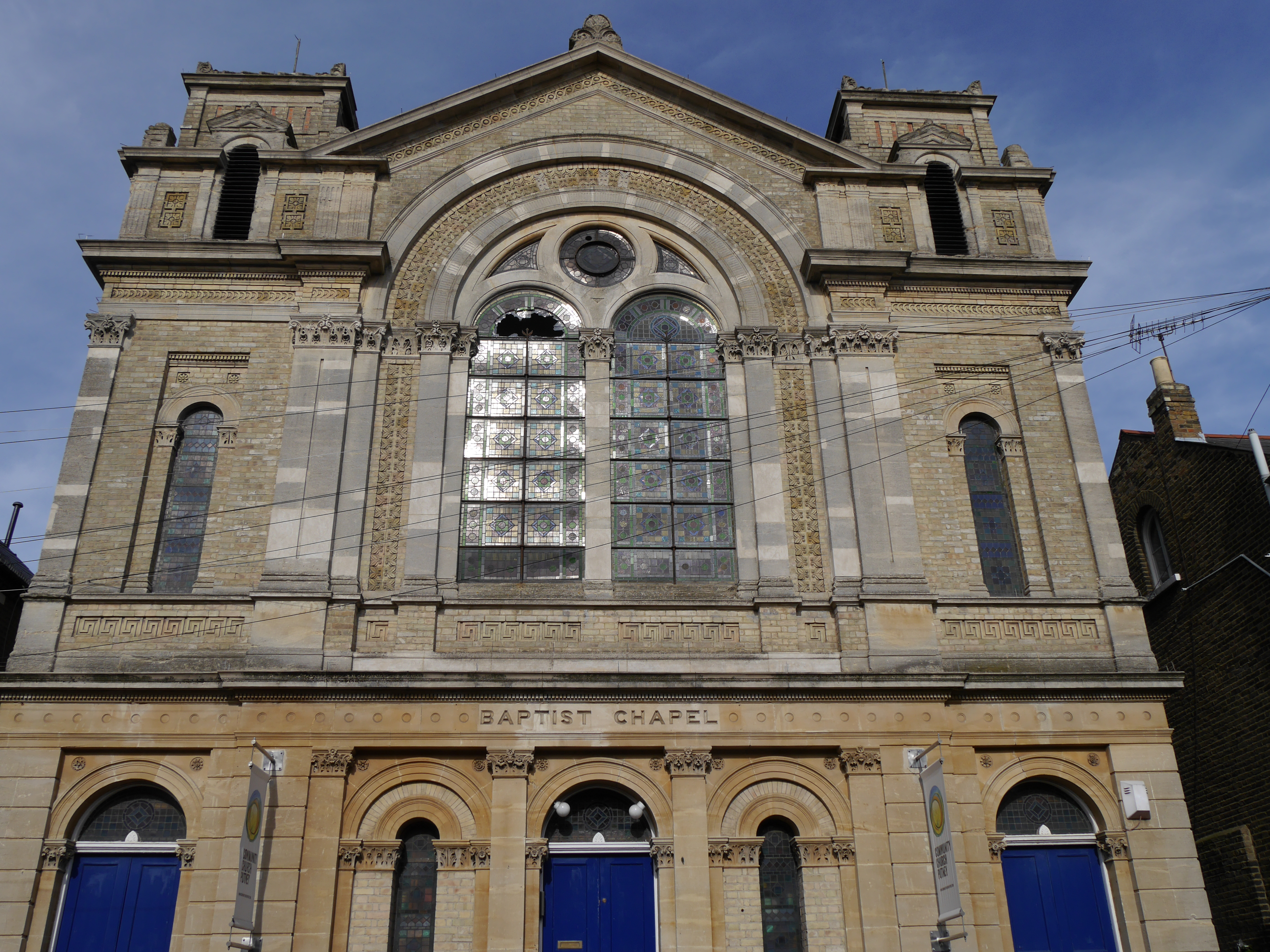
Werter Road Baptist Church

Church name	Location	Dedication	Web	Founded	Denomination	Notes
All Saints	Putney Common				Anglican	Liberal Catholic churchmanship; also used by Roman Catholic
All Saints	Tooting		–		Anglican	
All Saints	Wandsworth				Anglican	
Ascension of the Lord	Lavender Hill				Anglican	Anglo-Catholic
Christ Church	Balham				Anglican	Evangelical
Croatian National Chaplaincy	Clapham				Roman Catholic	served by the Order of Friars Minor
Holy Trinity	Wandsworth				Anglican	
Holy Ghost	Balham				Roman Catholic	
Longley Road Gospel Hall	Tooting		–		non-denominational	
Our Lady & St Peter	Wimbledon Common				Roman Catholic	
Our Lady of Mount Carmel & St Joseph	Battersea Park				Roman Catholic	served by the Comboni Missionaries of the Heart of Jesus
Our Lady of Pity & St Simon Stock	Putney				Roman Catholic	
Redeemed Christian Church of God FOCC	Fulham and Chelsea				Pentecostal	
Sacred Heart	West Battersea				Roman Catholic	
Shaftesbury Christian Centre	Battersea					
St Anne	Wandsworth				Anglican	
St Andrew	Balham				URC	
St Andrew	Battersea				URC	
St Anselm	Tooting Bec				Roman Catholic	
St Boniface	Tooting				Roman Catholic	
St Gregory	Earlsfield		–		Roman Catholic	
St John the Evangelist (Polish Church)	Putney				Roman Catholic	served by the Brothers of the Sacred Heart
St Joseph	Roehampton		–		Roman Catholic	
St Mark	Balham				URC	
St Mark's, Battersea Rise	Clapham Junction				Anglican	
St Mary	Battersea				Anglican	
St Mary	Putney				Anglican	Liberal Catholic churchmanship
St Mary Magdalen	Wandsworth				Roman Catholic	
St Nectarius	Battersea				Greek Orthodox	
St Nicholas	Tooting		–		Anglican	
St Thomas a Becket	Wandsworth				Roman Catholic	
St Vincent de Paul	Clapham Common				Roman Catholic	
The Bridge	Battersea					
Tooting United Reformed Church	Tooting		–		URC	
Trinity Road Chapel	Upper Tooting				FIEC	
Wandsworth Meeting House	Wandsworth		–		Quakers	
Werter Road Baptist Church	Putney		–		Baptist	
West Side Church	Wandsworth					

== Non-English speaking churches ==
There are many examples throughout Greater London of English-speaking churches which also provide regular worship in one or more secondary languages, particularly amongst the Anglican and Roman Catholic churches. Numerous English-speaking Roman Catholic churches in London provide worship in assorted non-English languages, including Arabic, Aramaic, Cantonese, Croatian, French, German, Hungarian, Italian, Korean, Latin, Lithuanian, Polish, Portuguese (including Brazilian Portuguese), Romanian, Slovak, Spanish, Syriac, Tamil and Tigrinya. The Eastern Orthodox churches in London also provide worship in many non-English languages, including Amharic, Arabic, Aramaic, Armenian, Georgian, Greek, Romanian, Russian, Serbian and Ukrainian.

The following table lists churches which conduct their worship in modern languages other than English, or English-speaking churches which have notable non-Anglophone congregations based in the same building.

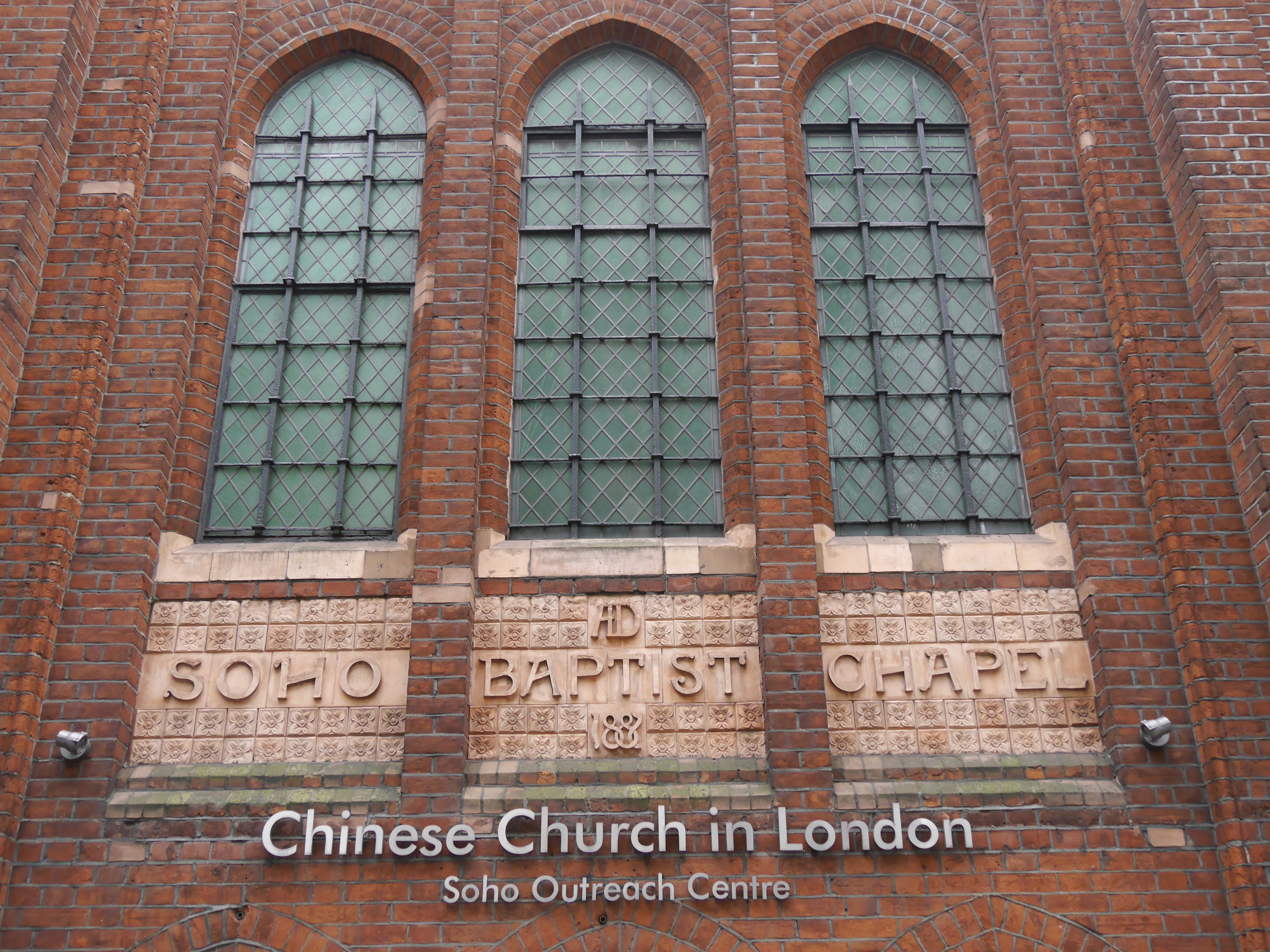
Chinese Church in London

Church name	Denomination (if any)	Location	Language
Assembléia de Deus		Stamford Hill	Portuguese
Assembléia de Deus de Londres		Park Royal	Portuguese
Beckton Chinese Gospel Church		Beckton	Chinese
Bendiciendo a las Naciones, Iglesia Cristiana de Newham		Canning Town	Spanish
Bethany Church of God		Southall	Tamil
Cathedral of the Dormition of the Mother of God and the Holy Royal Martyrs	Russian Orthodox	Gunnersbury	Russian, Old Church Slavonic
Chinese Church in London Worship and Ministry Centre		Hammersmith	Mandarin, Cantonese, English
Chinese Church in London Colindale Congregation		Colindale	Chinese
Chinese Church in London Croydon Congregation		Croydon	Chinese
Chinese Church in London Hounslow Congregation		Hounslow	Chinese
Chinese Church in London New Soho Congregation		Soho	Chinese
Chinese Congregation of the Methodist Church	Methodist	Epsom	Chinese
Chinese Student and Scholar Christian Fellowship		Fulham	Chinese
Church of the Good Shepherd	Georgian Orthodox	Upper Clapton	Georgian
Comunidad Cristiana de Londres		Elephant and Castle	Spanish
Confraternidad Bautista de Londres		Tulse Hill	Spanish
Divine Christian Church		Wembley	Tamil
Dutch Church, Austin Friars	Reformed	City of London	Dutch
East London Chinese Christian Church		Poplar	Chinese
East London Christian Fellowship Centre		Newbury Park	Chinese
East London Portuguese Speaking Seventh-day Adventist Church	7th-day Adventist	Little Ilford	Portuguese
Eglwys Gymraeg Canol Llundain (The Welsh Church of Central London)	Baptist	Westminster (Eastcastle Street)	Welsh
Emmanuel Christian Fellowship		Manor Park, Ilford, Barnet, Walthamstow, Newbury Park	Tamil
Emmanuel Evangelical Church		Westminster	Chinese
Faith Church of God		Morden, Wembley, East Ham, North Harrow	Tamil
Finnish Seamen's Church	Lutheran	Rotherhithe	Finnish
Grace Church		Mitcham	Tamil
Grace Evangelical Church		Crouch End	Tamil
Holy Trinity, Brook Green (Syriac Catholic congregation)	Roman Catholic/Syriac Catholic	Hammersmith	Arabic, Aramaic
Japanese ECC Japanese Church	nondenominational	Ealing	Japanese
Japanese Anglican Church	Anglican	Ealing	Japanese
Japanese Reformed Church	Anglican/Lutheran	St Botolph's Aldersgate, City of London	Japanese
Korean Church		New Malden	Korean
London Chinese Alliance Church		Harrow	Chinese
London Chinese Fellowship		Elephant and Castle	Chinese
London Chinese Lutheran Church	Lutheran	Fitzrovia	Chinese
London Chinese Scholar Christian Fellowship		Kings Cross	Chinese
London Spanish Speaking Charasmic Baptist Church	Baptist	West Norwood	Spanish
Notre Dame de France	Roman Catholic	Leicester Square	French
Our Lady of Hungary	Roman Catholic	Ealing	Hungarian
Our Lady Mother of the Church	Roman Catholic	Ealing	Polish
Our Lady of Czestochowa and Saint Casimir	Roman Catholic	Islington	Polish
Polish Church of the Evangelist	Roman Catholic	Putney	Polish
Rhenish Church		Covent Garden	Chinese
Russian Speaking Adventist Church	7th-day Adventist	Furzedown	Russian
South London Alliance Church		Colliers Wood	Chinese
St Anne's Lutheran Church	Lutheran	City of London	Swahili
St Andrew Bobola Polish Church	Roman Catholic	Shepherd's Bush	Polish
St Benet's Metropolitan Welsh Church	Anglican	City of London (London EC4)	Welsh
St Boniface's German Church	Roman Catholic	Whitechapel	German
St Casimir's Lithuanian Church	Roman Catholic	Cambridge Heath	Lithuanian
St Catherine's Danish Church	Lutheran	Camden Town	Danish
St David's Welsh Church	Anglican	Paddington Green	Welsh
St Dunstan-in-the-West (Romanian Orthodox congregation)	Romanian Orthodox	City of London	Romanian
St Martin-in-the-Fields (Anglican Chinese Congregation)	Anglican	Trafalgar Square	Mandarin & Cantonese
St Olav's Norwegian Church	Lutheran	Rotherhithe	Norwegian
St Peter's Italian Church	Roman Catholic	Clerkenwell	Italian
St Sarkis	Armenian Apostolic	Kensington	Armenian
St Sava Serbian Orthodox Church	Serbian Orthodox	Notting Hill	Serbian
St Sophia's Cathedral	Greek Orthodox	Bayswater	Greek
St Thomas Aquinas	Roman Catholic	Ham	German
Tamil Church of God		Palmers Green	Tamil
Ulrika Eleonora Church	Lutheran	Marylebone	Swedish
United Methodist Church (Zimbabwe Episcopal Mission Area)	United Methodist	Mottingham	Shona

== Related lists ==
- Commission for Building Fifty New Churches
- List of Christopher Wren churches in London
- List of places of worship in London, 1804
- Union of Benefices Act 1860

== External links/sources ==
- Anglican Diocese of London
- Baptist Union Churches
- Church of England Parish Finder
- Church of England churches in central London
- The Church of Jesus Christ of Latter-day Saints
- The History Files: Churches of the British Isles and Europe
- Congregational Churches in London
- Friends of the City Churches
- Gospel Hall Finder
- Greek Orthodox Archdiocese of Thyateira and Great Britain
- Love's Guide to the Church Bells of the City of London
- Methodist Church of Great Britain Church Search
- Roman Catholic Diocese of Brentwood Parishes A-Z
- Roman Catholic Diocese of Westminster – Virtual Diocese
- Roman Catholic Archdiocese of Southwark – Parish Directory
- Seventh-day Adventist Churches in London
- United Reformed Church Find A Church
- Redeemed Christian Church of God
