= St Patrick's Church, Leeds =

St Patrick's Church
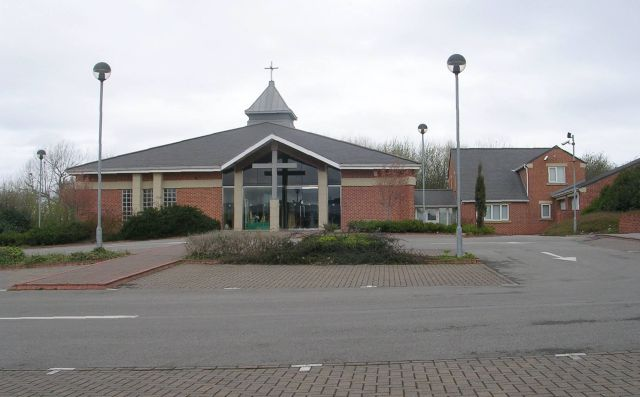
- St Patrick's Church
- 53.7991°N 1.5285°W
- OS grid reference: SE 32142 33912
- Location: Torre Road, Leeds
- Country: England
- Denomination: Roman Catholic
- Website: DioceseofLeeds.org.uk

History
- Status: Parish church
- Founded: 1889
- Dedication: Saint Patrick
- Events: Moved April 2001

Architecture
- Functional status: Active
- Heritage designation: Grade II listed
- Designated: 2 September 1998
- Architect: John Kelly
- Completed: April 2001

Administration
- Province: Liverpool
- Diocese: Leeds
- Deanery: Leeds East

St Patrick's Church is the name of two Roman Catholic Parish Churches in Leeds, West Yorkshire, England. The first church was built from 1889 to 1891, designed by John Kelly, and is a Grade II listed building. It is on Rider Street, next to the New York Road and East Street Arts. In April 2001, St Patrick's Church moved to Torre Road. The original building closed and the new church opened the next day. The new St Patrick's Church is on Torre Road in the east end of the city.

== History ==
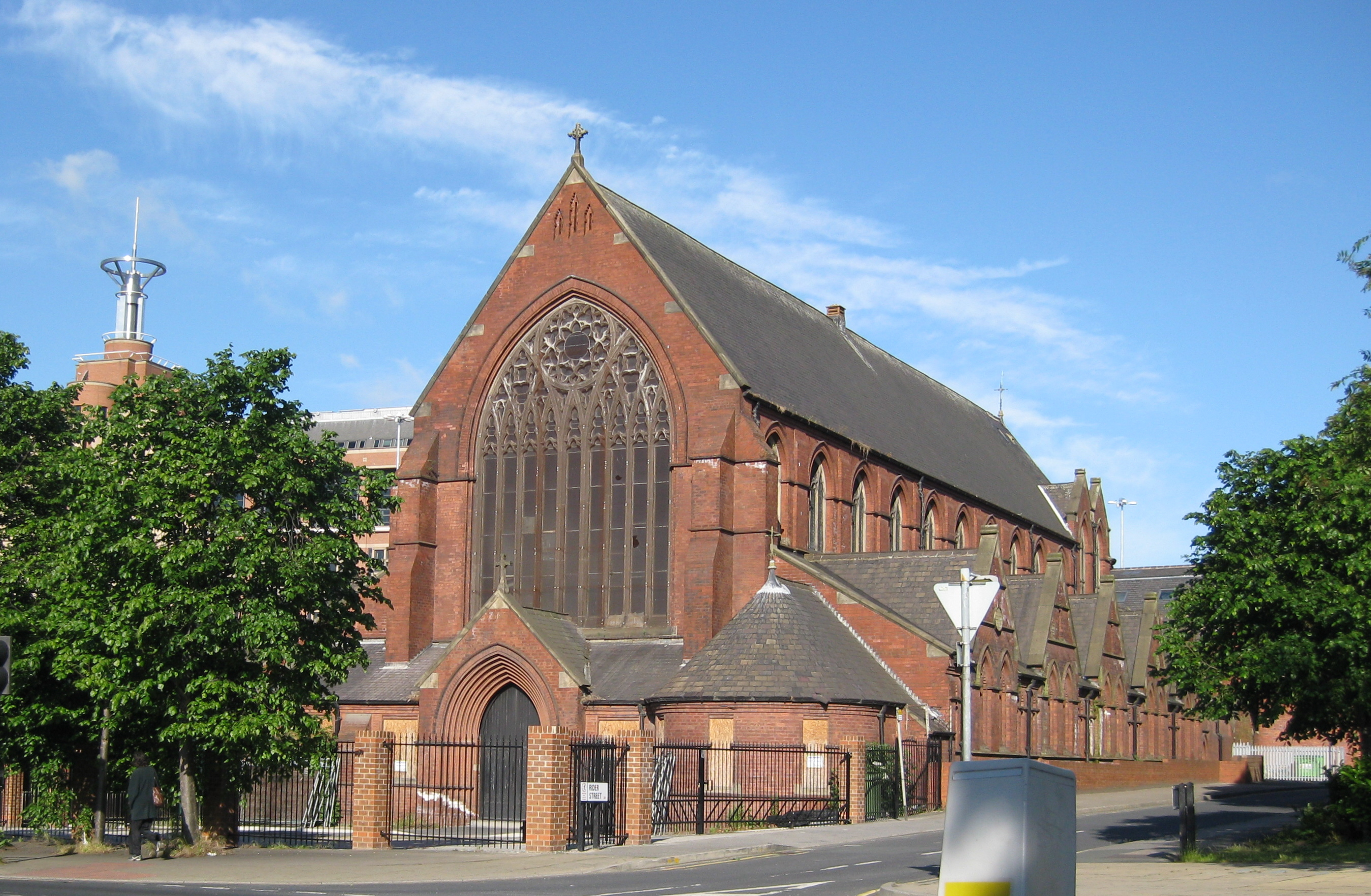
St Patrick's Church from 1891 to 2001.

=== Construction ===
In 1889, building work started on St Patrick's Church on Rider Street. It was designed by John Kelly, who also designed All Saints' Church, Petersham, London, Sacred Heart Church, Teddington and St Patrick's Church, Soho Square. It was opened in 1891.

=== Move ===
Leading up to April 2001, construction work began on a new St Patrick's Church on Torre Road in Leeds. When it was finished, the old one closed and the new one opened the next day. The original church is now occupied by the West Yorkshire Playhouse and has East Street Arts next to it.

== Parish ==
St Patrick's Church has two Sunday Masses: Saturday 6:00 pm and 10:00 am on Sunday morning.

== See also ==
- Roman Catholic Diocese of Leeds
