= Artist House 45 =

Artist House 45 was a British artist-led housing project implemented by East Street Arts. The programme was an artist-in-residence opportunity in a two bedroom house in Beeston, Leeds, that aimed to have artists engage in the surrounding neighbourhood through their art projects and practices.The residency was in collaboration with the Leeds City Council, Residencies lasted from a few months to nearly three years, before the project ended in 2019.

== History ==
East Street Arts developed the pilot project, combining affordable housing and artist residencies, in Beeston, Leeds in 2015. A vacant back-to-back house, owned by the Leeds City Council, served as the primary residence for artists to live and work in the neighbourhood. The project partnered with Leeds Empties, an organization committed to minimizing vacant and unoccupied homes in Leeds. The Esmée Fairbairn Foundation also assisted with grant funding. The project was greenlit for the property to be rented from the Leeds City Council for five years.

An open call for an artist residency encouraged artists with a socially engaged practice to apply. The first artists moved into the residence in January 2015. Each residency varied over the duration of the pilot project, starting out with year-long stays, to shorter month-long stays.

The project supported artists with bursaries as they created work in a new city and environment. The goal of the project was to build relationships between artists and local residents to positively impact the neighbourhood through community involvement.

== Examples of participant's projects ==
Artists Toby Lloyd and Andrew Wilson (known as the collaborative team Lloyd-Wilson) were the first residents of Artist House 45, taking on a year-long residency. However, they lived as artists-in-residence for almost three years, from January 2015 to October 2017. At Artist House 45, they completed six projects: Community BBQ (2016), AH45 Inside (2015-18), 1AH45 Outside (2015-16), Broadcast Bartender (2015), What Is An Art? (2015) and Trajectory of the everyday #5 (2015). The work focused on the physical space the house was in and how it affected their practice and methodologies. Early into their residency, Lloyd-Wilson became engaged in the maintenance of the residential area’s nature, they partnered with the Beeston Green Patch to preserve the green in the neighbourhood, and formed connections with Beeston’s residents as they did so.

Artists Sophie Chapman and Kerri Jefferis were the second residents of the house, which they inhabited between May to September 2019. During their residency they created Idle Acts (2019), Rowland Road Working Mens Club (2019) and Chewing the Fat: Play Act Cards (PAC), (2020). This project is a card game that is based on improv and micro role-play, and is inspired by prompts from Artist House 45’s neighborhood and takes inspiration from their film Idle Acts. Idle Acts was a film by Sophie + Kerri that they created during their 2019 residency in Artist House 45. In addition to Artist House 45’s ties with East Street Arts and Leeds City Council, Idle Acts collaborated with The Arts Council England, Rowland Working Men’s Club, and Leeds Inspired, with cinematography and sound design by Lou Macnamara and Martha Adebambo respectively. Idle Acts was a four day production depicting snapshots of daily life through a lens of unreality. Sophie + Kerri worked with twelve actors to make Idle Acts.
