= Kelly & Birchall =

British architectural firm

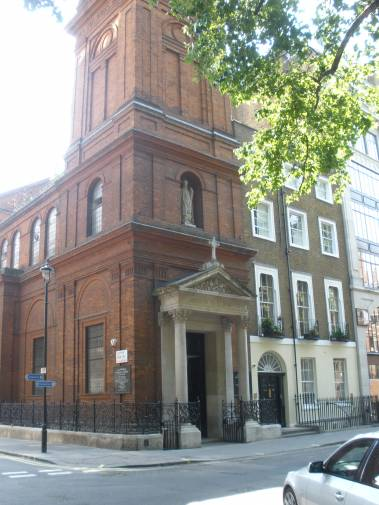
- St Patrick's Church, Soho Square, central London, built by Kelly & Birchall in 1891–93

Practice information
- Key architects: John Kelly; Edward Birchall
- Founded: 1886
- Dissolved: 1904
- Location: Leeds

Significant works and honors
- Buildings: St Patrick's Church, Soho Square (Grade II* listed); St Luke's Church, Kingston upon Thames (Grade II listed)

Kelly & Birchall, a partnership between Edward Birchall (1839 – 6 March 1903) and John Kelly (1840–1904), was an architectural practice based in Leeds, England, from 1886 to 1904 and specialising in churches in the Italianate and Gothic Revival styles.

== Works ==
The partnership between Edward Birchall, who had practised in Leeds since the early 1860s, and John Kelly, who had previously been in partnership with Richard Life Adams (1840–83), was established in 1886.

The church of St Mary of Bethany, New Wortley, Leeds was one of Kelly & Birchall's earliest projects. Initially worked on by Adams & Kelly, Kelly & Birchall took it to completion. Built in 1885 at a cost of £5,600, it featured a spire of 135 feet and a brick-lined interior. St Mary of Bethany was demolished in 1975. Two more of Kelly & Birchall's Leeds buildings have also since been demolished. The original All Hallows Church, on the corner of Hyde Park Road and Regent Terrace, Leeds, built in 1876 at an estimated cost of £10,585, was destroyed by fire on 27 April 1970, though the vicarage remains. The Roman Catholic church of St Francis of Assisi, Manor Road, Holbeck, built in 1896, was closed and demolished in 1979.

Kelly & Birchall designed the Grade II listed St Luke's Church on Gibbon Road in Kingston upon Thames, built between 1886 and 1887 and the Grade II* listed St Patrick's Church, Soho Square (a Roman Catholic church in central London), built between 1891 and 1893.

In Leeds they also designed the Central Higher Grade School (later known as Leeds Higher Grade School) in Woodhouse Lane; this was built in 1889, with an attic added in 1890 by William Landless, who had been clerk of works at Kelly & Birchall, executing designs on their behalf. The building was converted to Council offices in 1994–95.

John Kelly went on to design several notable churches, including All Saints' Church, Petersham in the London Borough of Richmond upon Thames (Grade II listed, and now a private residence). Kelly's Roman Catholic churches, which also include St Agatha's Roman Catholic Church, Kingston upon Thames and Sacred Heart Church, Teddington in the London Borough of Richmond upon Thames, are all in a distinctive Italianate style, with Romanesque features and some with large campanile.

Towards the end of his career, Kelly was short-listed for, but failed to win, the contract for the Cathedral Church of St Anne's, Leeds. Approaching retirement, Kelly established a new practice, John Kelly & Sons, in Oxford Street, London. The church of St Alban and St Stephen in St Albans dates from this time. Following John Kelly's death in 1904, his son Claude Kelly took over the practice. The design of St Peter's Church, Aldrington in Hove (Grade II listed), attributed to Claude, is believed to have also been worked on by his father.

Edward Birchall's other work includes the country house Tylney Hall in Hampshire, built in 1879, which is Grade II listed and is now a hotel, and Carlton Hill Friends Meeting House (1868) which was the principal Quaker Meeting House in Leeds. Part of the building became a clothing factory in 1921, with the Quakers continuing to meet in a schoolroom at the back until 1979. The building was refurbished by Leeds Metropolitan University in 2007 and is now called Old Broadcasting House. It has a blue plaque, erected by Leeds Civic Trust, commemorating Birchall and the history of the building.

== Gallery ==
Buildings by Kelly & Birchall

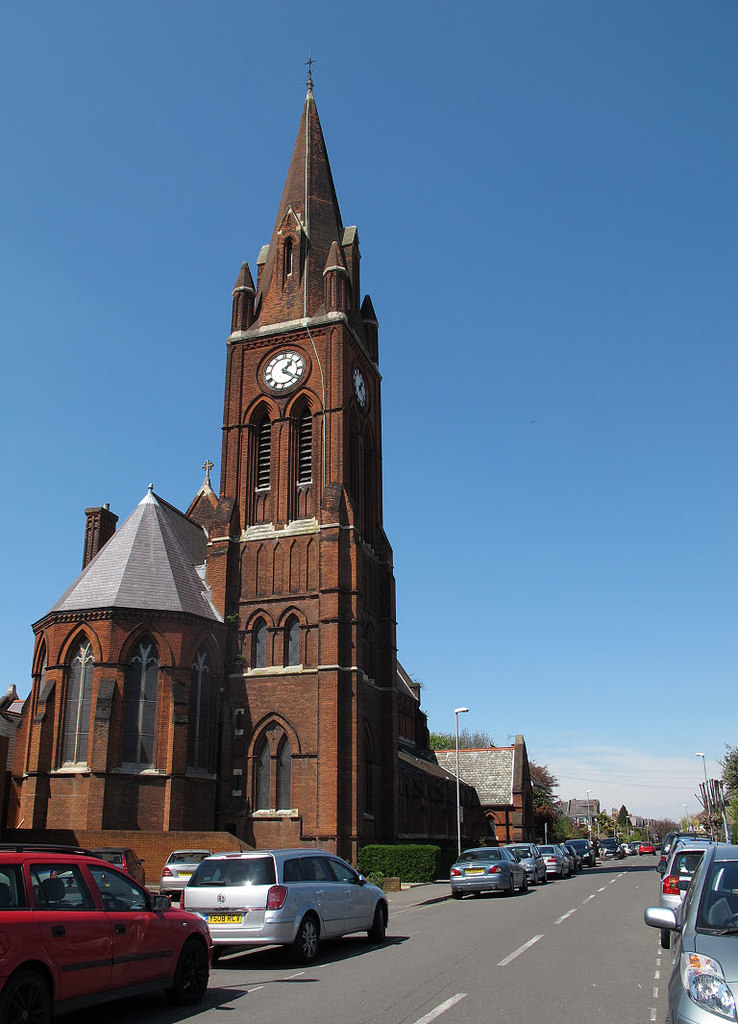
St Luke's Church, Kingston upon Thames – south end, 1886–87

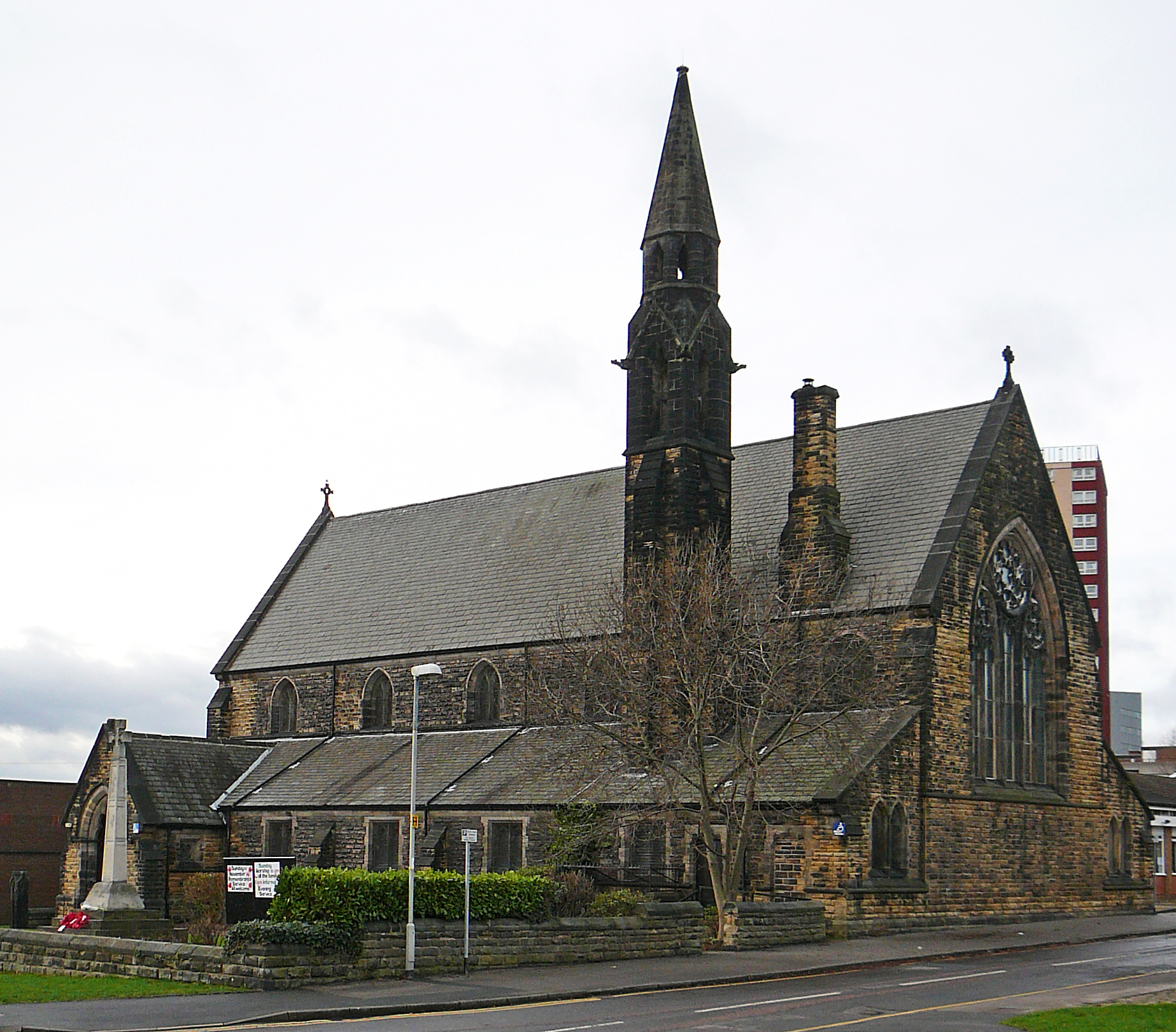
St Agnes' Church, Burmantofts, Leeds, West Yorkshire, 1887–89

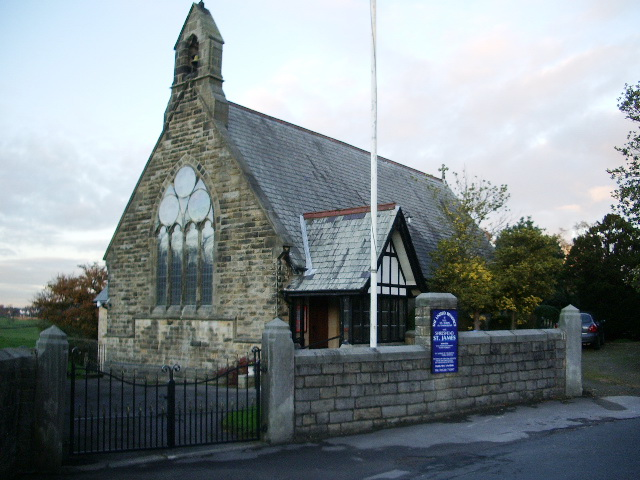
St James' Church, Shireshead, Lancashire, 1887–90

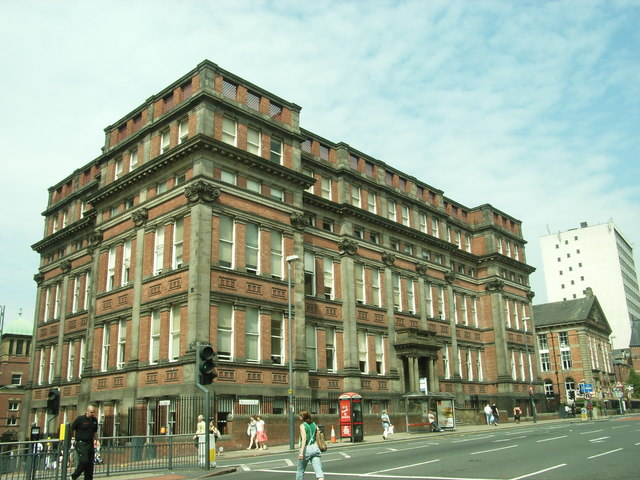
Leeds Higher Grade School, Woodhouse Lane, Leeds. Built 1889, extended 1890

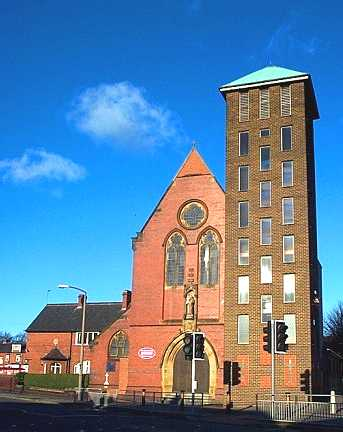
St Anthony of Padua Roman Catholic Church, Beeston, Leeds, 1904
Buildings by Kelly

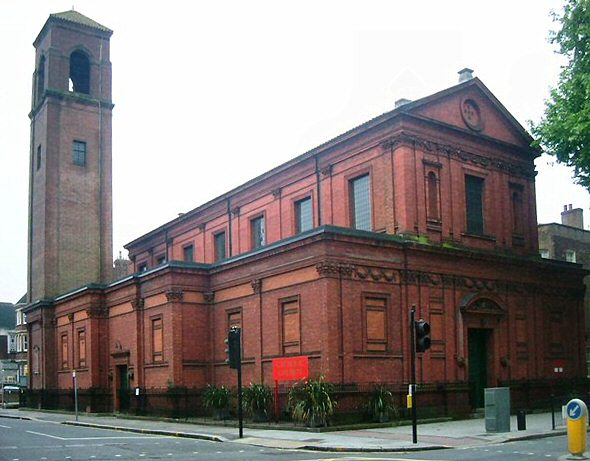
Our Lady of Grace and St Edward, Chiswick, 1886

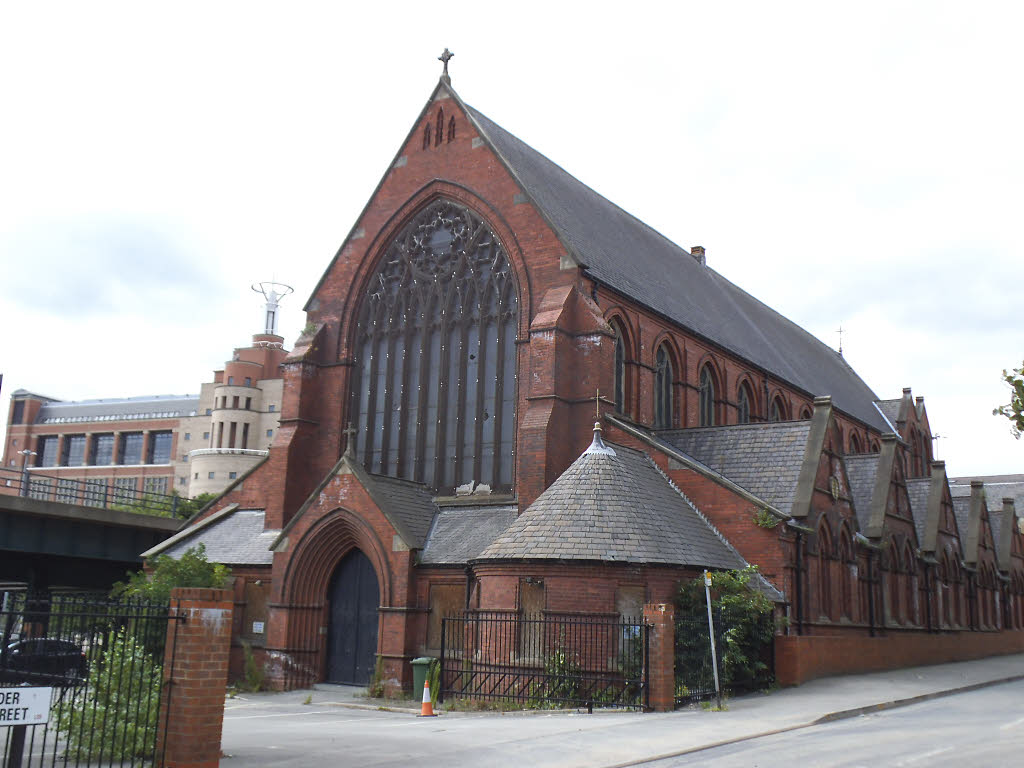
St Patrick's Church, Leeds, 1891

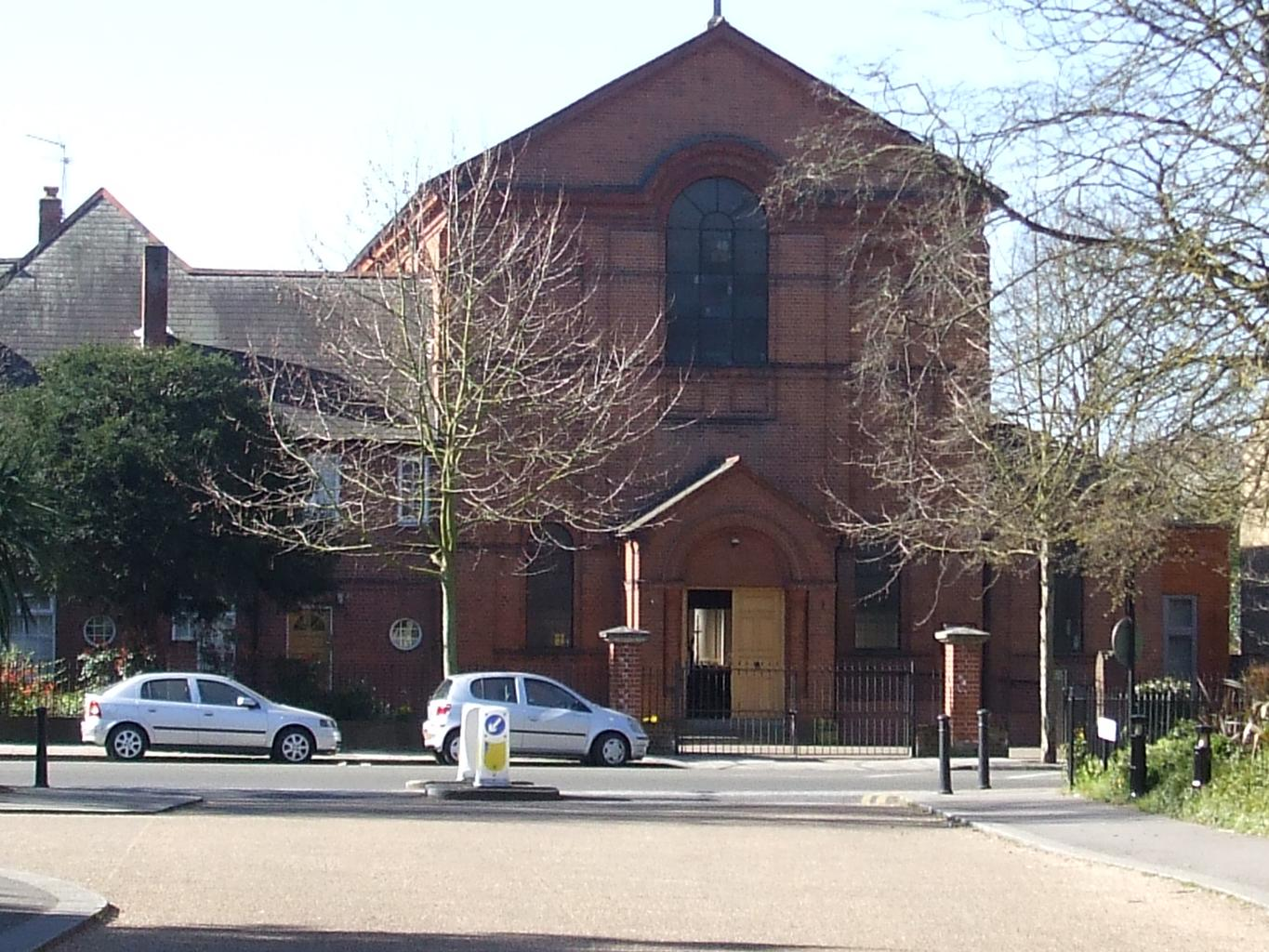
Sacred Heart Church, Teddington, 1893

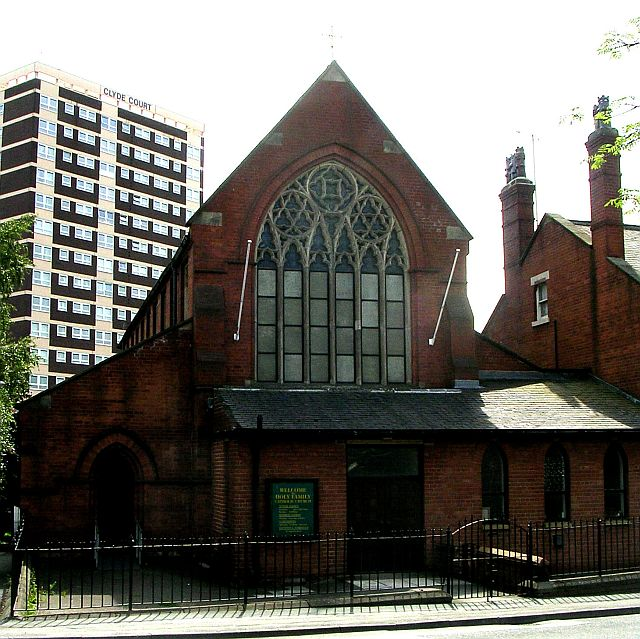
Holy Family Catholic Church, Green Lane, Wortley, Leeds, 1895

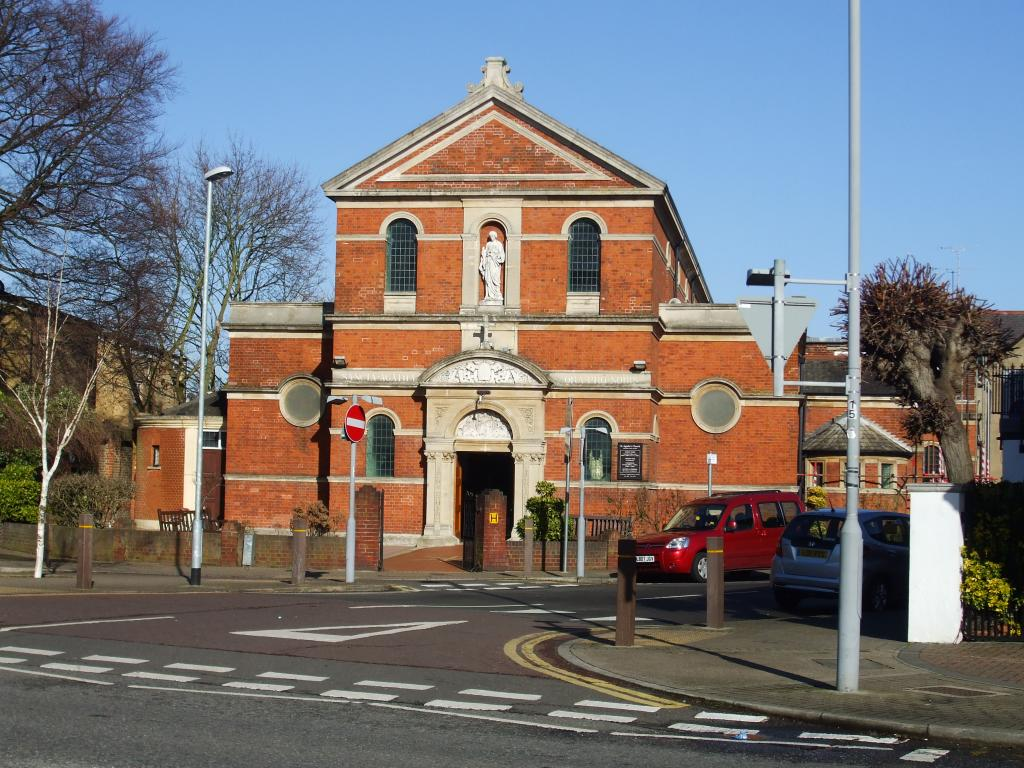
St Agatha's Roman Catholic Church, Kingston upon Thames, 1899

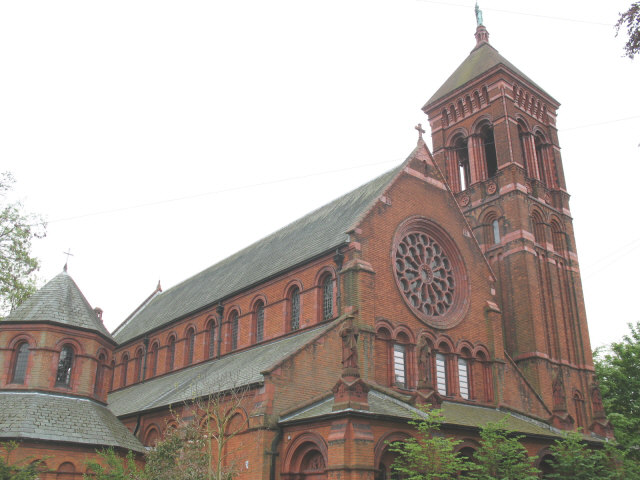
All Saints' Church, Petersham, commissioned 1899

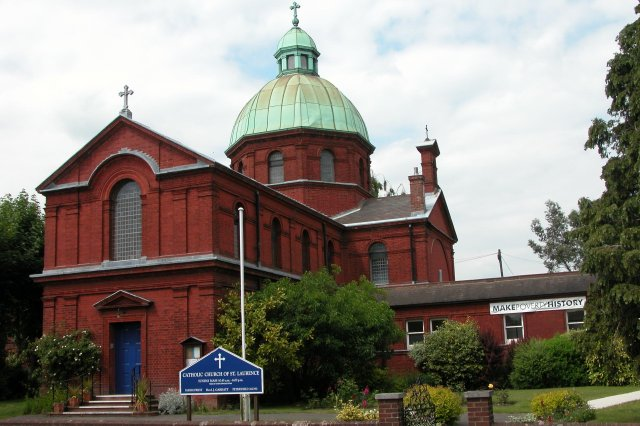
St Laurence's Catholic Church, Petersfield, 1890–91

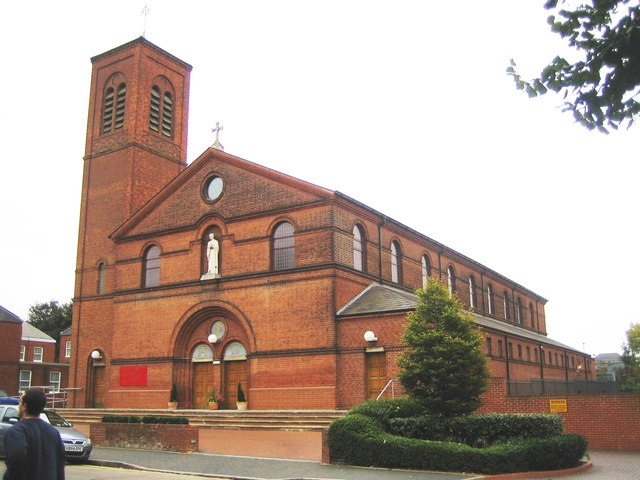
Catholic Church of Ss Alban and Stephen, St Albans, Hertfordshire. John Kelly & Sons, 1903

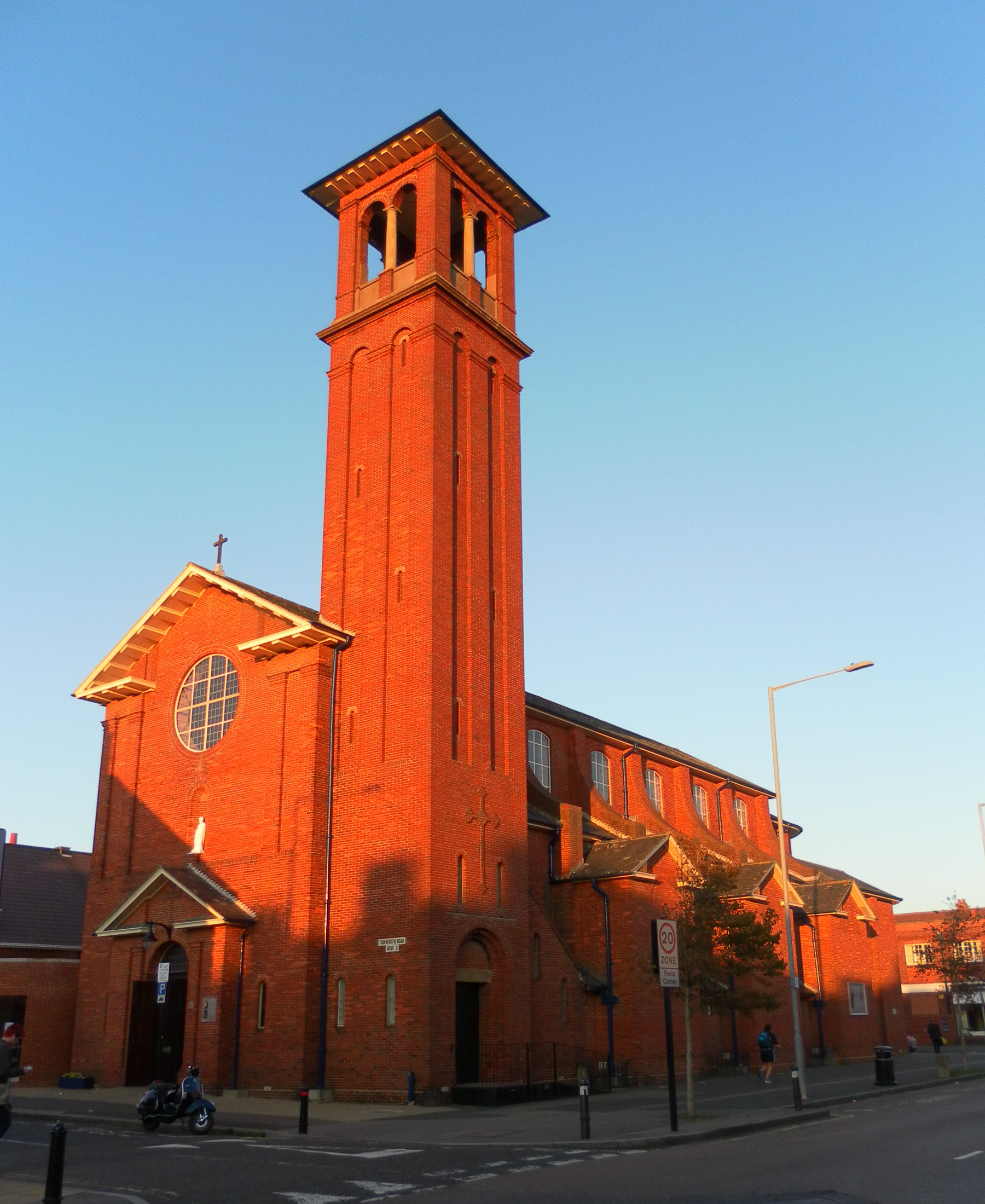
St Peter's Church, Aldrington, Hove, 1912–15. Designed by John Kelly's son Claude Kelly, but John Kelly is also thought to have been involved
Buildings by Birchall

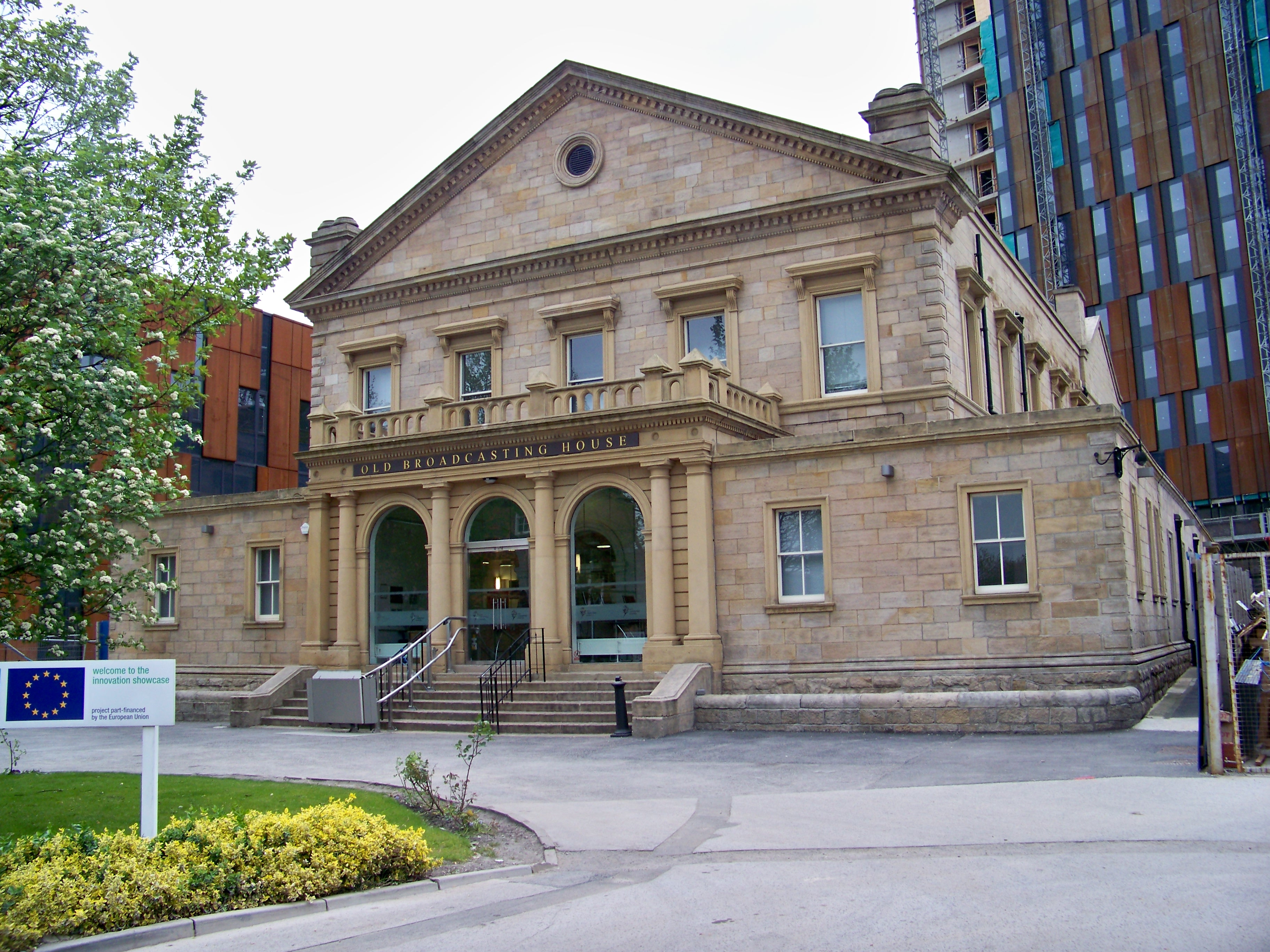
Old Broadcasting House, Leeds, formerly Carlton Hill Friends Meeting House, built in 1868

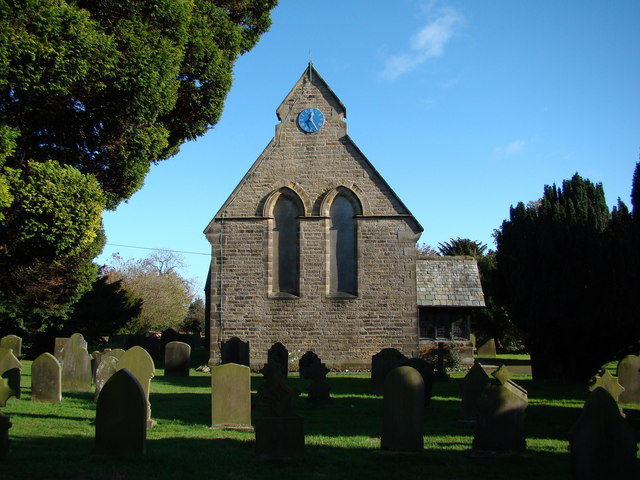
St Michael and All Angels Church, Sawley, North Yorkshire, 1878–79

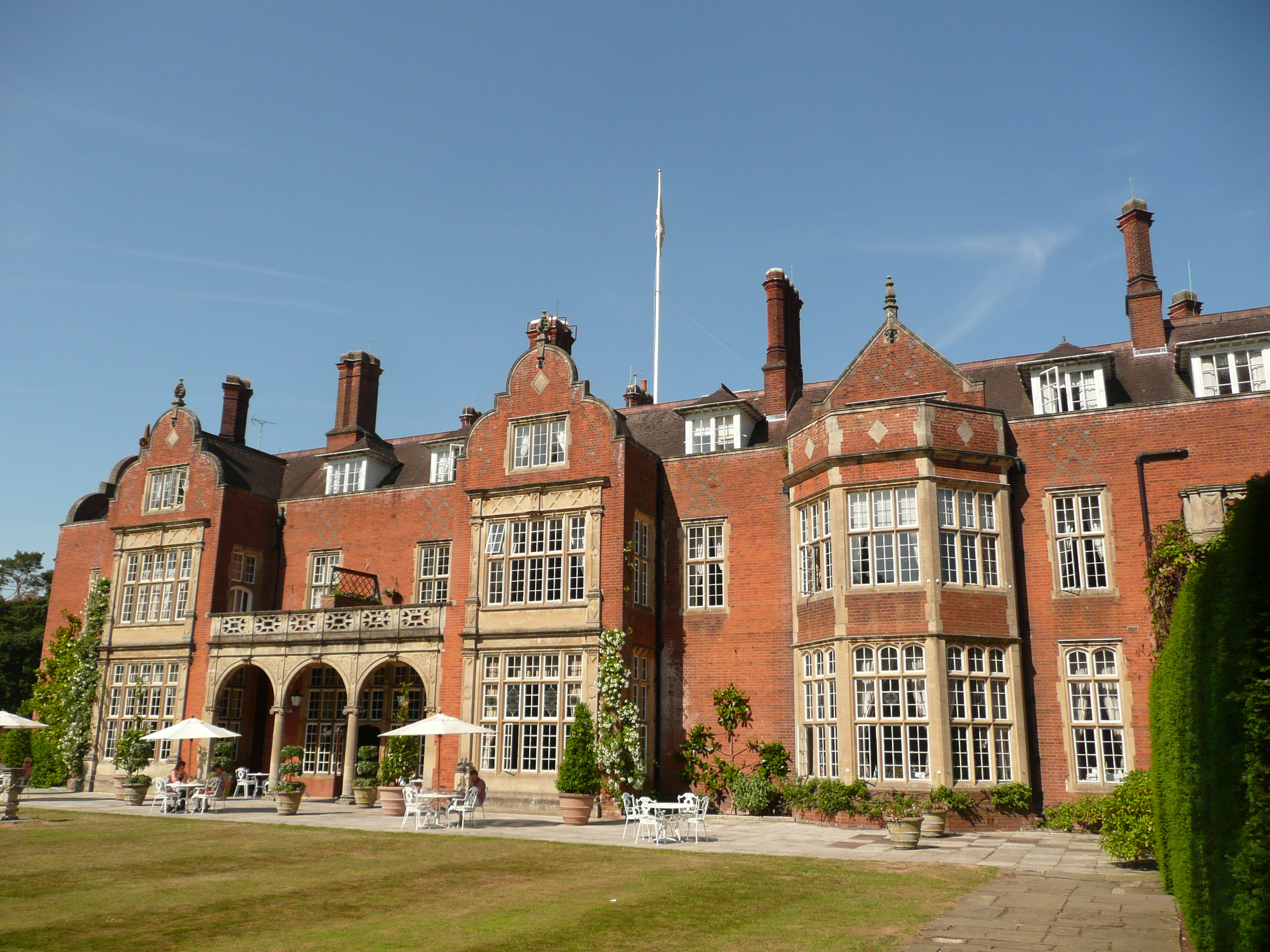
Tylney Hall, Rotherwick, Hook, Hart, Hampshire, built in 1879

== See also ==
- Adams & Kelly
