= St Peter's Church, Aldrington =

Church in East Sussex, England

St Peter's Church
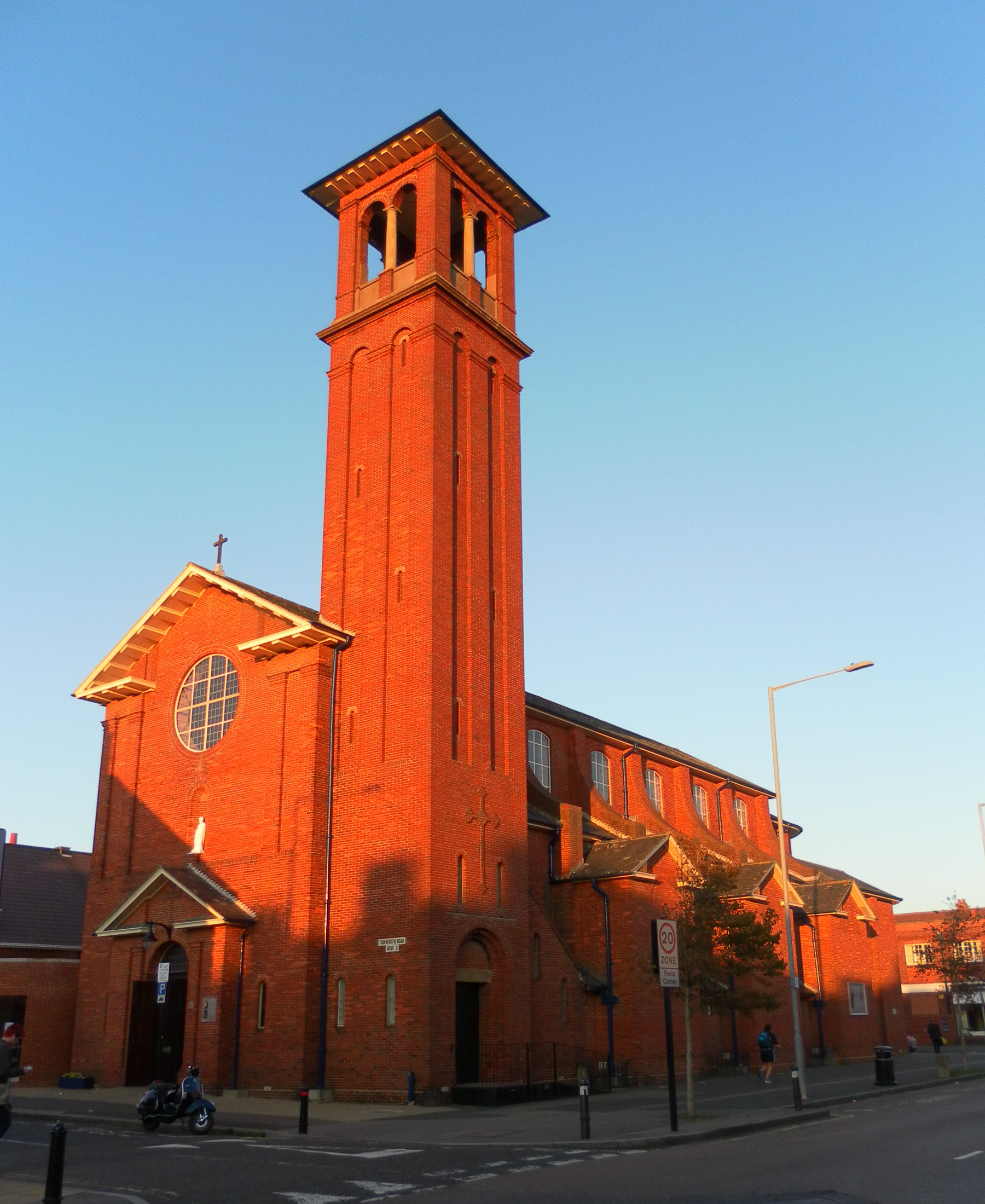
- The church from the southwest
- St Peter's Church
- 50.8335°N 0.1849°W
- Location: Portland Road, Aldrington, Brighton and Hove BN3 5GD
- Country: England
- Denomination: Roman Catholic
- Website: www.stpeters-hove.org.uk/

History
- Status: Parish church
- Founded: 1904 (as church hall)
- Dedication: Saint Peter
- Consecrated: 28 June 1927

Architecture
- Functional status: Active
- Heritage designation: Grade II listed
- Designated: 22 February 1988
- Architect: Claude Kelly
- Style: Romanesque Revival
- Groundbreaking: 1913
- Completed: August 1915

Administration
- Diocese: Arundel and Brighton
- Deanery: Brighton and Hove
- Parish: Hove, St Peter

Clergy
- Priest: Canon David Parmiter

St Peter's Church is a Roman Catholic church in the Aldrington area of Hove, part of the English city of Brighton and Hove. It is one of three Roman Catholic churches in Hove and one of eleven in the wider city area. Built between 1912 and 1915 in a red-brick Romanesque style, its tall campanile forms a local landmark. It has been listed at Grade II by English Heritage in view of its architectural importance.

== History ==
Hove's first Roman Catholic church was the Church of the Sacred Heart on Norton Road. Early in the 20th century, its priest paid £600 for a plot of land on Portland Road—a main road running westwards from Hove towards Aldrington and Portslade—with the intention of establishing a new church there. A hall, dedicated to St Peter, was built on this site in 1902, and Mass was first celebrated there in 1904. It was part of the parish of the Church of the Sacred Heart until 1920, when it became its own separate parish. An architect called Dixon submitted plans for a new church in 1912; in September of that year the local Council granted permission for building work to begin, but his designs were abandoned and a different architect, Claude Kelly, was chosen. He submitted his own design in 1913. It was similar to a church, St Saviour's Church, Lewisham, that he previously designed in 1909.

A new priest was appointed in 1915, and he raised £9,000 (£800,000 as of 2025) towards the building of Kelly's church. It was finished in August 1915. Claude Kelly's father John, who had designed dozens of churches in his architectural career, is believed to have been involved as well—he had been in partnership with his son since 1904—and another ecclesiastical architect, J. Marshall, may also have worked on the building.

St Peter's was not consecrated until 28 June 1927, after improvements were made to the internal fixtures. The original pews and pulpit were replaced in 1929, and a parishioner provided the church with an organ made by Henry Willis & Sons.

The church is licensed for worship in accordance with the Places of Worship Registration Act 1855 and has the registration number 40697.

== Architecture ==
The church is built of red brick in a stretcher bond pattern. The roofs are of slate. The nave has six bays and north and south aisles; the latter has three side chapels, and there is also a Lady chapel with a round roof and two lancet windows. The chancel and apse have a similar roof design. A presbytery adjoins the northeastern side, and at the opposite corner is the building's landmark—a tall campanile with bell-chamber and copper roof. The entrance, flanked by pilasters, is at the west end below a rose window. Described as "startling" by English Heritage for its similarity to an Italian-style basilica, the church is also considered to have an impressive interior; there is much use of marble in various colours, and a barrel-vaulted ceiling. In 2019 the plain glass in the rose window was replaced with a new rose window designed by DTForsdyke and created by DTForsdyke & Silver Stained Glass. The window was commissioned to celebrate the centenary of the church.

== The church today ==
St Peter's Church was listed at Grade II by English Heritage on 22 February 1988. It is one of 1,124 Grade II-listed buildings and structures, and 1,218 listed buildings of all grades, in the city of Brighton and Hove.

Mass is celebrated every weekday morning and on Saturday evenings; there are three Sunday Masses; and there are regular Eucharistic adoration, Confession and prayer sessions.

St Peter's is one of eleven Roman Catholic churches in Brighton and Hove. The Church of the Sacred Heart, its former mother church, and St George's Church in the suburb of West Blatchington are also in Hove; there are six in Brighton, and one each in Rottingdean and Woodingdean.

== See also ==
- Grade II listed buildings in Brighton and Hove: S
- List of places of worship in Brighton and Hove
- Media related to St Peter's Church, Aldrington at Wikimedia Commons
