= Augustus Edmonds Tozer =

English composer and organist

Augustus Edmonds Tozer F.R.C.O., A.R.C.M. (13 January 1857 – 4 March 1910) was an English composer and organist.

== Early life ==
Augustus Tozer was born in Little Sutton, at the time a small village on the Wirral Peninsula, but now a suburb of the town of Ellesmere Port. He was sent to attend the City of London School in 1870 and, having shown a talent for music, went on to study at the Royal Academy of Music.

== Academic life ==
His particular skill was with the pipe organ and, having applied for membership of the Royal College of Organists was appointed as a Fellow at the exceptionally young age of 19. He subsequently attained his Licensiateship with the Royal Academy for his ability with the organ in 1882 and was awarded his Associateship of the Royal College of Music for his music theory and composition work in 1887. Following completion of a degree in music at Durham University, he undertook further studies at Oxford University until, in November 1895, he qualified for his Doctorate.

== Appointments ==
His first formal appointment was as organist and choirmaster was at St. Mary Magdalene, St. Leonards-on-Sea, then an Anglican church, and, for a period, also held the position of choirmaster at the newly built Holy Trinity, Hastings.

Whilst studying in London he converted to Roman Catholicism and took posts at several Catholic churches before settling on the south coast and becoming musical director for Church of the Sacred Heart, Hove, in 1888. He held this post until close to his death.

== Work and recognition ==
In 1890 he was admitted to the Sylvestrine Order by Pope Leo XIII for his services to Roman Catholic Church Music, having at least composed six full Masses and edited or compiled several Catholic hymnals.

He also worked with Elgar, whose mother was a Catholic, on several of his Catholic compositions, and included them in his collection 'The Complete Benediction Manual', although Elgar later recounted to Hubert Leicester how Tozer had changed the harmonies so that the published version was “absolutely different” from, and inferior to, Elgar’s original.

One of his most enduring hymn tunes is entitled Jazer and was set to several different words in both Protestant and Catholic hymnals.

== Later years ==
In 1901, Tozer's health deteriorated and he retired from Hove where he was living “on his own means” to Steyning (later the home of John Ireland) where he died in March 1910.
