= St Luke's Church, Kingston upon Thames =

St Luke's Church
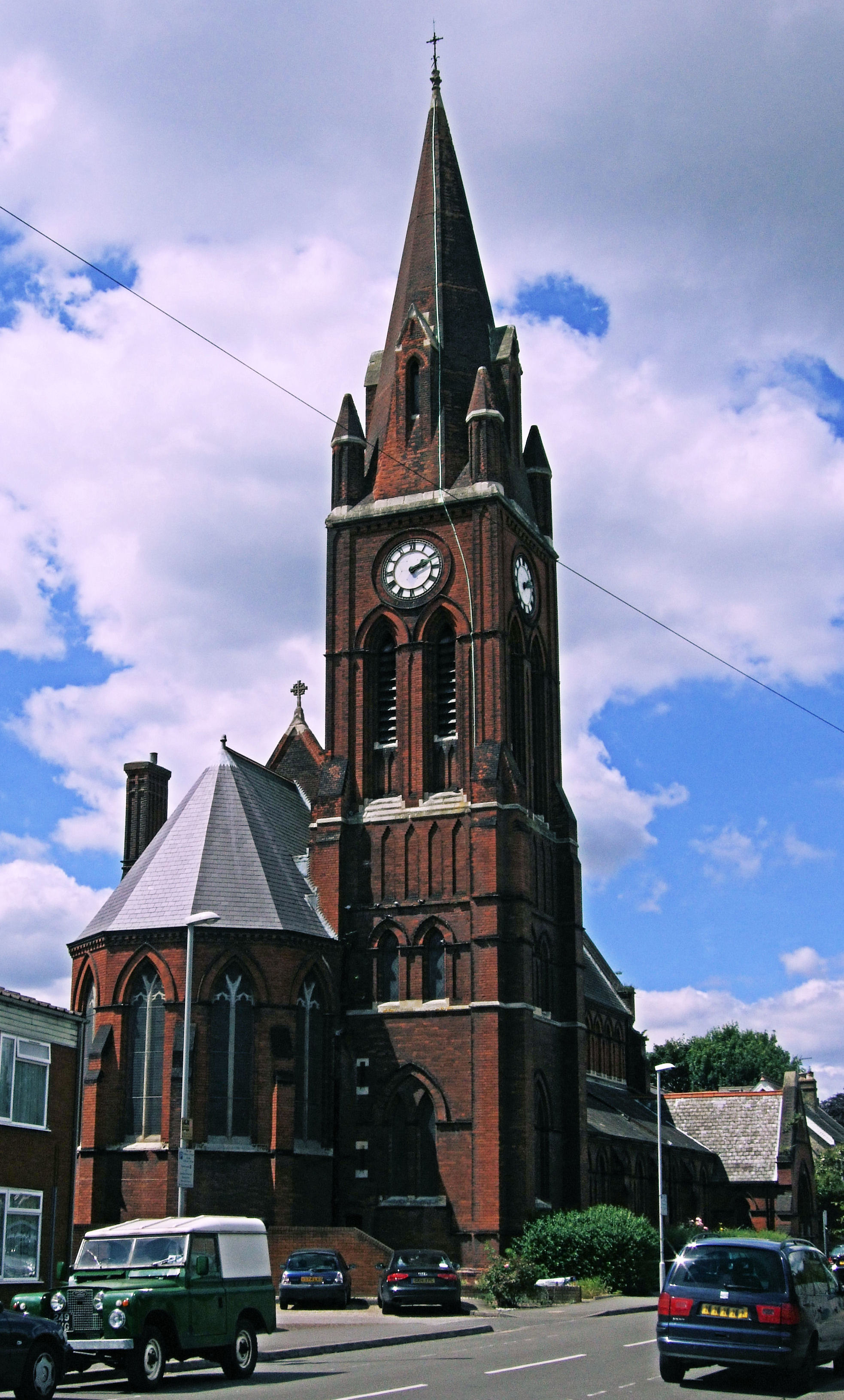
- South end of St Luke's Church, built 1886–87
- St Luke's Church
- 51.416699°N 0.297235°W
- Country: England
- Denomination: Church of England
- Churchmanship: Traditional Catholic
- Website: St Luke's Church

Architecture
- Style: Gothic Revival
- Years built: 1887

Administration
- Diocese: Southwark
- Archdeaconry: Wandsworth
- Deanery: Kingston
- Parish: St Luke's, Kingston

Clergy
- Bishop: The Rt Revd Jonathan Baker (AEO)
- Vicar: Fr Martin Hislop

Listed Building – Grade II
- Designated: 24 November 2006
- Reference no.: 1391818

St Luke's Church is a Grade II listed Church of England church on Gibbon Road in Kingston upon Thames, London. Designed by the Leeds architectural firm Kelly & Birchall, it was constructed between 1886 and 1887 by a local building firm, W. H. Gaze.

== History ==
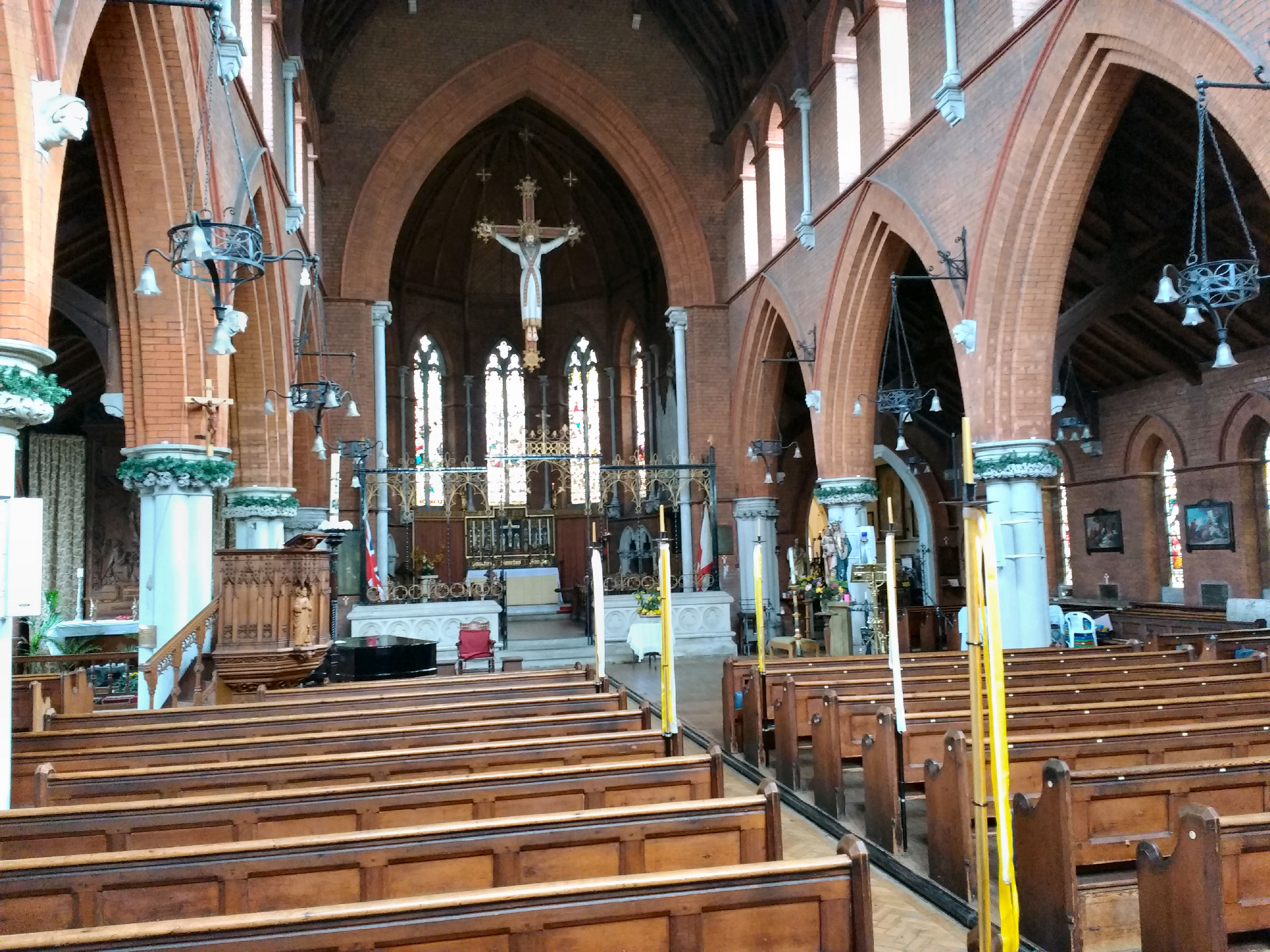
Interior

The church was built to serve the railway workers whose houses form the surrounding streets, situated to the north of the railway station in Kingston. The parish was poor but, through the well-connected wife of the first vicar, received sponsorship from society figures, most notably Princess Mary Adelaide of Cambridge, granddaughter of George III and mother of Queen Mary, consort of George V. This allowed for the prominent church which stands today, the spire of which was completed in 1891 following a further donation of funds by Lady Wolverton.

A painting showing the original design for the church survives. It shows that the building was constructed largely as it was intended by the architects, with only the design of the spire being slightly modified and a clock inserted into the tower. Following extensive research by two local parishioners, the painting was discovered on 2 August 2019; it now rests with the vicar of St Luke's Church, Fr Martin.

=== Present day ===
St Luke's Church stands in the Anglo-Catholic tradition of the Church of England. As the parish rejects the ordination of women, it receives alternative episcopal oversight from the Bishop of Fulham (currently Jonathan Baker).

Services are held on Sunday mornings and evenings, on Tuesday and Thursday mornings and on Wednesday evenings. The vicar is Fr Martin Hislop.
