= St Agatha's Roman Catholic Church, Kingston upon Thames =

Church in Kingston upon Thames, England

Coordinates: 51°25′11″N 0°17′35″W

St Agatha's
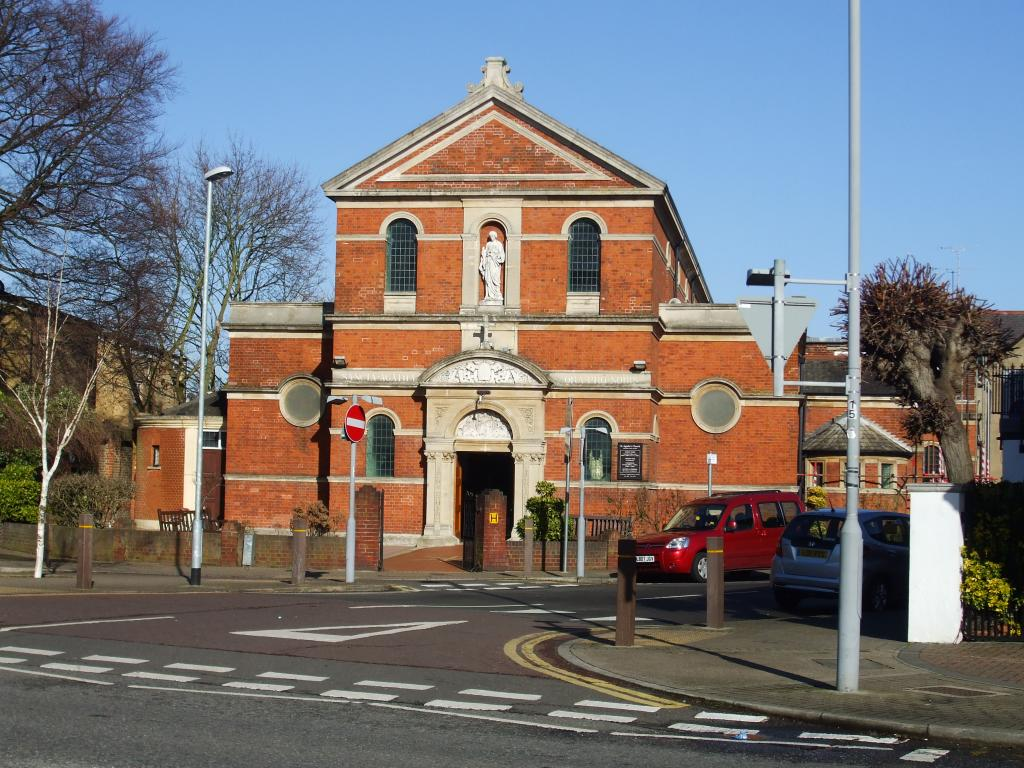
- St Agatha's
- OS grid reference: TQ 18787 70347
- Location: 1 Wyndham Road, Kingston upon Thames KT2 5JR
- Country: England
- Denomination: Roman Catholic
- Website: Official website

History
- Founded: 1899
- Founder: Louisa Curry

Architecture
- Architect: John Kelly
- Style: Italianate

Administration
- Diocese: Archdiocese of Southwark
- Parish: Kingston

Clergy
- Priest(s): Fr. Francis Olaseni, MSP

Listed Building – Grade II
- Official name: Roman Catholic Church of St Agatha
- Designated: 19 April 1990
- Reference no.: 1080058

St Agatha's is a Roman Catholic church on Wyndham Road in Kingston upon Thames, London. It is dedicated to Saint Agatha of Sicily.

The Italianate church building, which is Grade II listed by Historic England, was erected in 1899. It was designed by the Leeds-based architect John Kelly and its construction was funded by a local benefactor, Louisa Curry.
