= St Saviour's Church, Lewisham =

Coordinates: 51.4601°N 0.0108°W

Saint Saviour's Church
- Church of Saint Saviour, St John the Baptist and St John the Evangelist
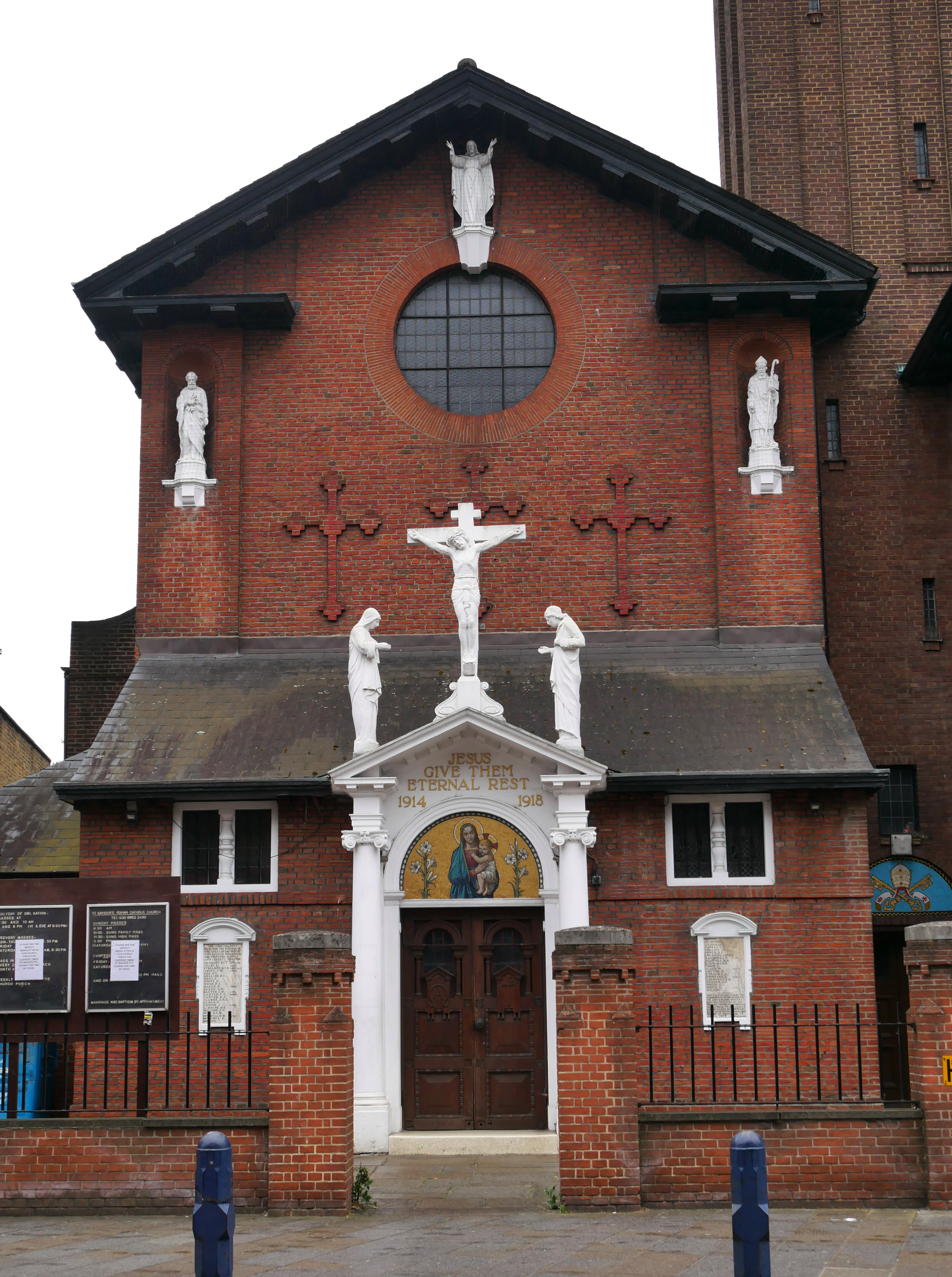
- Saint Saviour's Church
- OS grid reference: TQ 38290 75337
- Location: Lewisham
- Country: England
- Denomination: Catholic
- Website: Official website

History
- Status: Parish church
- Dedication: Jesus as Saviour; John the Baptist; John the Evangelist
- Consecrated: 23 October 1917

Architecture
- Functional status: Active
- Heritage designation: Grade II listed
- Designated: 12 March 1973
- Architect: Claude Kelly
- Style: Italianate
- Groundbreaking: 24 April 1909
- Completed: 9 December 1909
- Construction cost: £3,000

Administration
- Province: Southwark
- Archdiocese: Southwark
- Deanery: Lewisham
- Parish: Lewisham

St Saviour's Church or St Saviour, St John the Baptist and St John the Evangelist Church is a Catholic Parish church in Lewisham, London. It was built in 1898, and architecturally it is in the Italianate style, with a coloured marble interior. The church is situated in the centre of Lewisham on the High Street. It is a Grade II listed building.

== History ==
=== Foundation ===
While there were Catholics present in Lewisham in the 1800s, for most of that century, there was no official place of worship. In 1893, in autumn, a meeting was held to organise regular worship in one location. As a result of the meeting, a French resident of Lewsiham allowed Mass to be said in her home on Morley Road. The first Mass there was celebrated on 27 May 1894. A priest, Fr Sheehan, came from Our Lady Help of Christians Church, Blackheath for it. Later that year, a parish was created encompassing the Catholics in Lewisham and a resident priest was appointed, Fr McClymont. However, as the location was too small, the search for a permanent chapel continued. A hall in the School of Art was briefly used. Afterwards, an abandoned building in Rushey Green was purchased and was turned into St Columba's Chapel.

When a new resident priest arrived, Fr George B. Tatum, the chapel was renamed St Saviour and Saints John the Baptist and Evangelist. The efforts to have a larger church continued. In 1898, a school and chapel were built on a piece of land purchased on the High Street. It was the site of a former manor, dating from the 1600s, called The Limes. The parish priest at the time was Fr James Connell. He continued the efforts to have a church and another school large enough to accommodate the growing community. The school and the chapel still exist, at the back of the current church, with the former chapel now the school hall.

=== Construction ===
On 24 April 1909, the foundation stone of the current church was laid. Construction of the church was funded by the founder of the Pearl Assurance Company, now the Phoenix Group, Patrick James Foley. The cost of the initial building came to £2,000. The architect was Claude Kelly. He also designed St Peter's Church, Aldrington in a similar style. On 9 December 1909, the church was opened. A new larger school was opened the following year. However, the church was quite small. In 1914, additions were made to it: the main altar, pulpit, side passages, confessionals and side chapel dedicated to St Patrick. The total cost came to £3,000 and it was paid off in 1917, and the church was consecrated on 23 October 1917.

=== Developments ===
More chapels continued to be added to the church: the Lady Chapel in 1918, St Joseph Chapel in 1921, and the Sacred Heart Chapel in 1924. A new presbytery and the bell tower were constructed from 1928 to 1929 next to the church. From 1978 to 1979, repairs were made to the church interior.

== Parish ==
Next to the church is still the school, St Saviour's Catholic Primary School. The church has five Sunday Masses at 5:30pm on Saturday and at 8:30 am, 10:00 am, 11:30 am and 5:30 pm on Sunday.

== Exterior ==
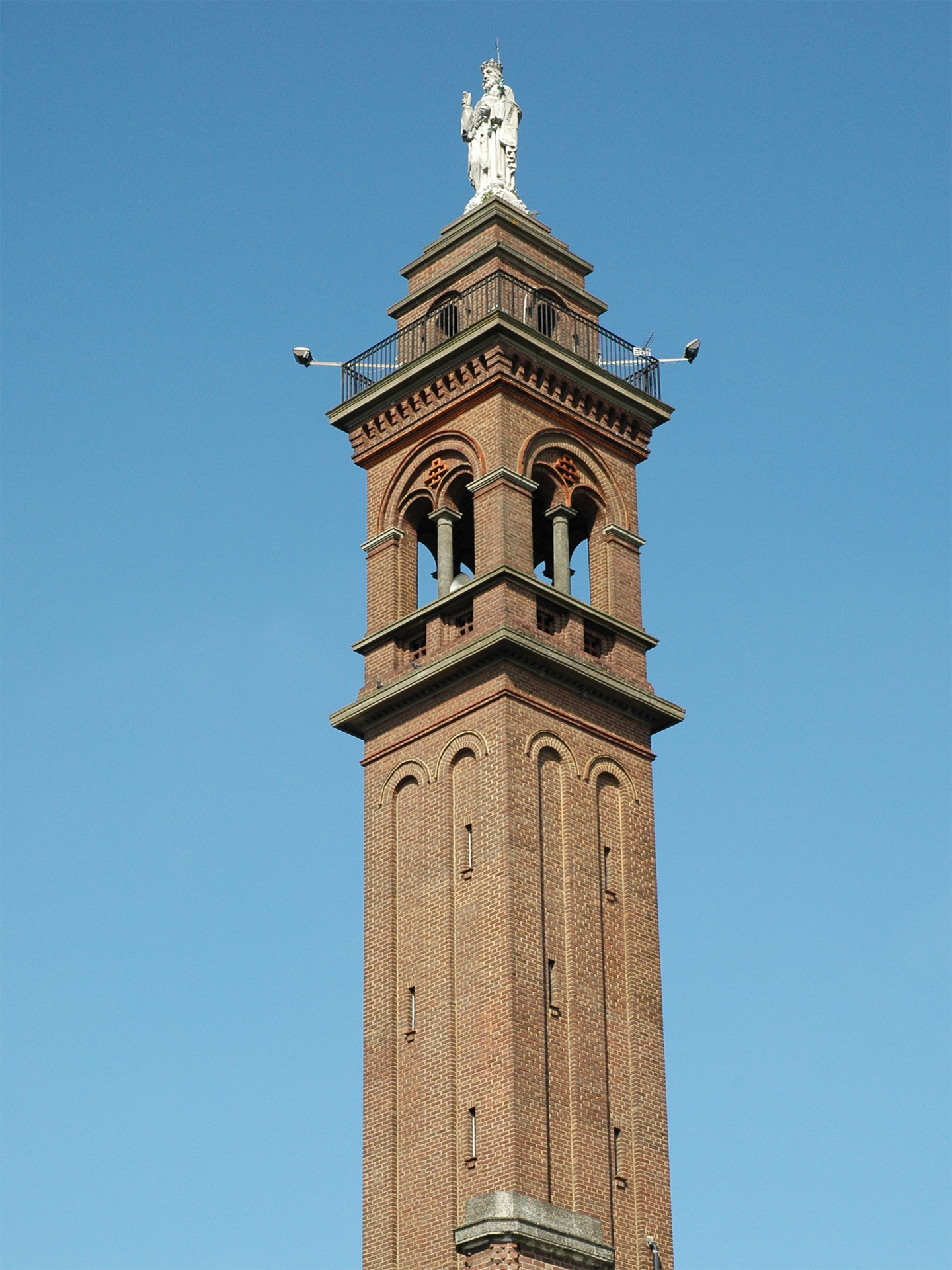
Church tower

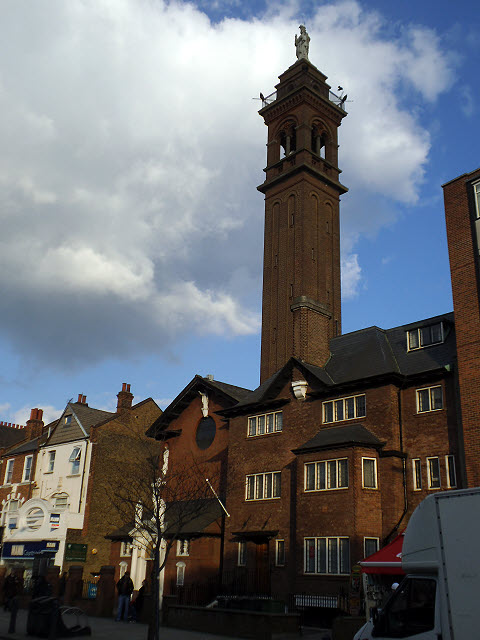
Church and presbytery

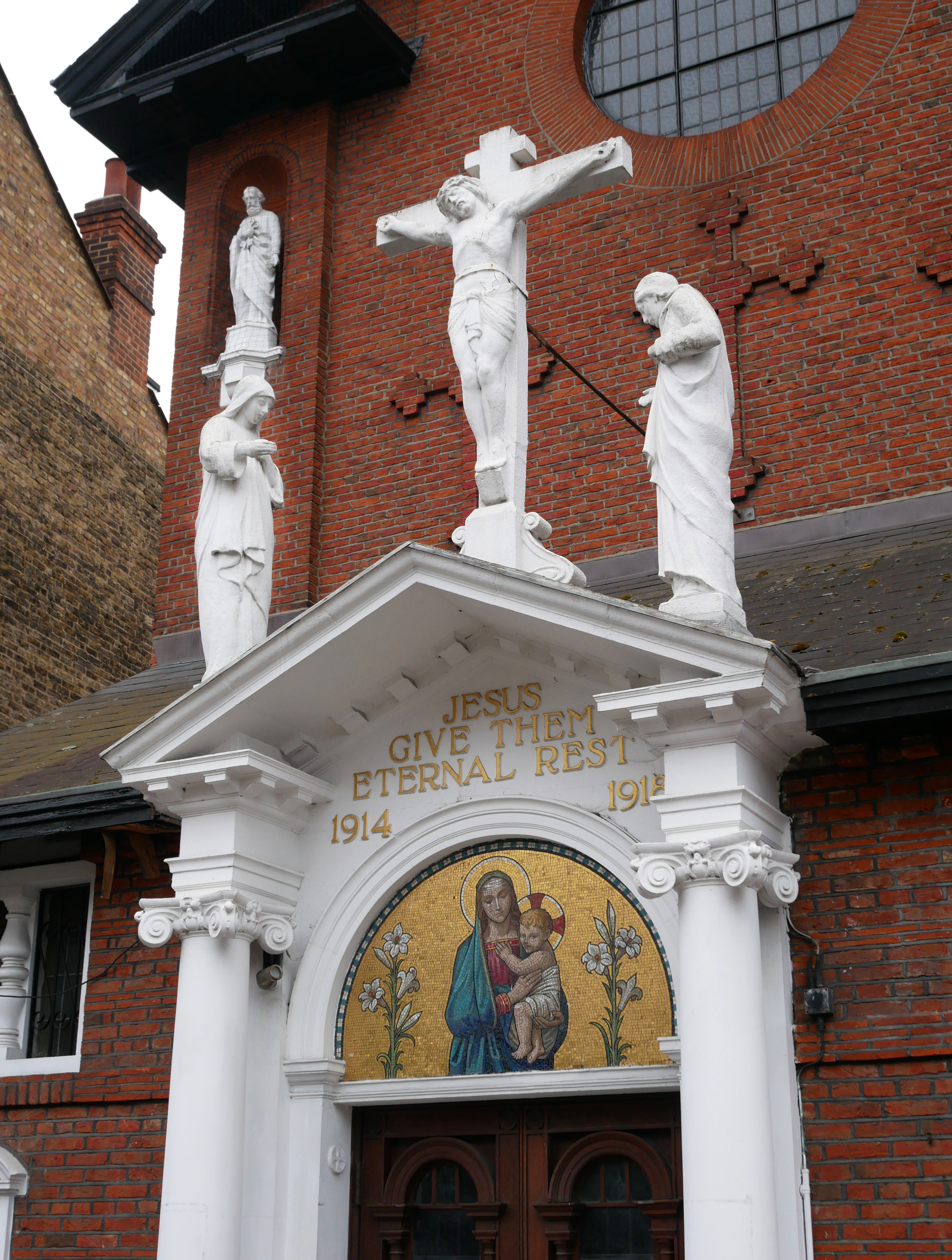
Doorway

== See also ==
- Archdiocese of Southwark
