= Arthur O'Leary (preacher) =

Irish Franciscan preacher

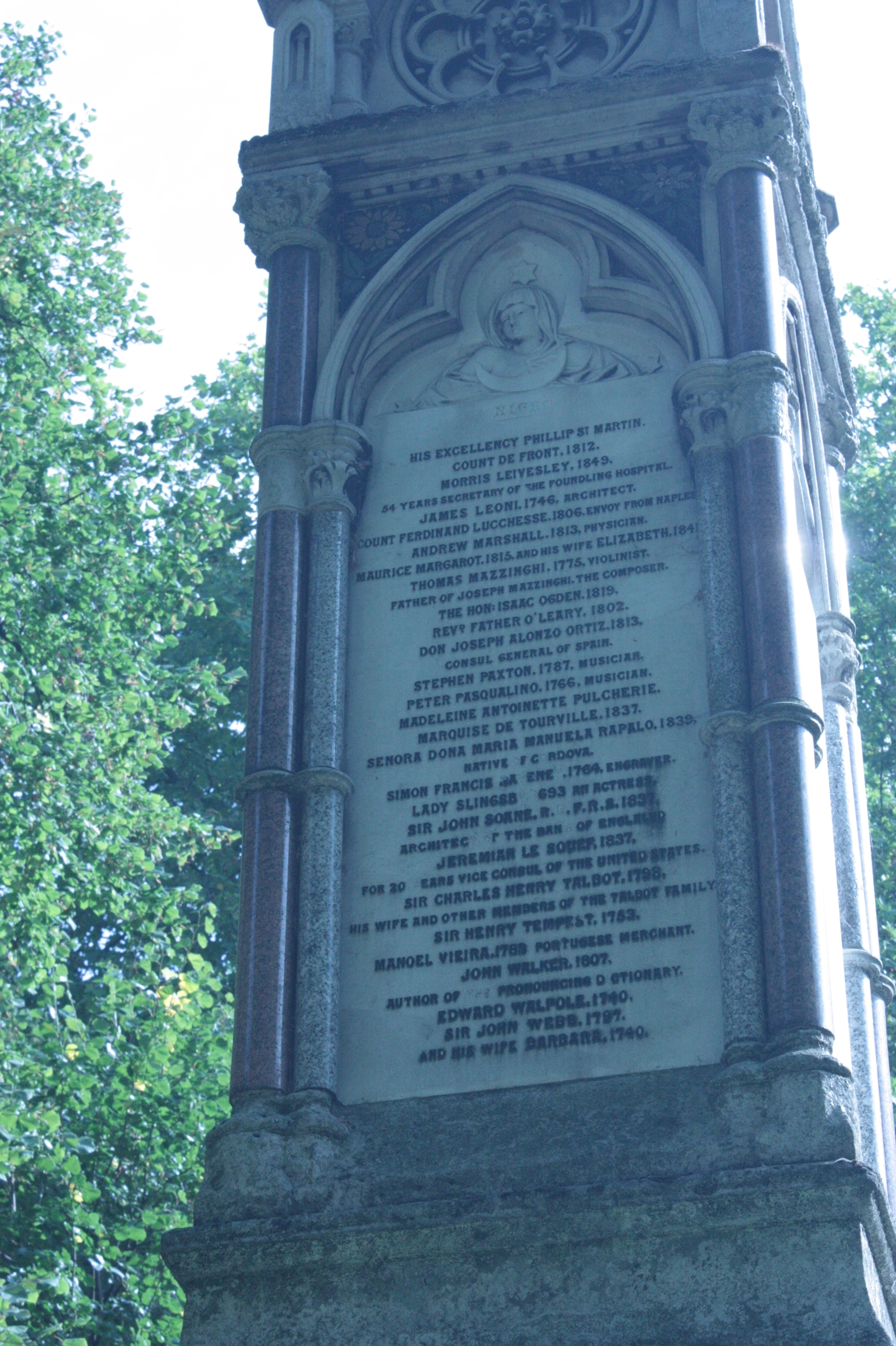
Father O'Leary's name on the Burdett Coutts Memorial, Old St Pancras Churchyard, London (detail)

Arthur O'Leary (1729 – 8 January 1802) was an Irish Capuchin friar and polemical writer.

== Life ==
O'Leary was born at Fanlobbus, County Cork, Ireland. He was educated with the Capuchins of Saint Malo, where he was ordained and spent twenty-four years as a prison chaplain. In 1777 he returned to Cork to engage in missionary work. His preaching soon attracted large audiences.

He is charged by James Froude with having received secret-service money from the Government, but other historians consider this unproven. In 1786-88 he argued the Catholic case in the so-called "Paper War" between conservative Protestants and moderates that sought further legal reform of the Penal Laws, leading towards Catholic emancipation. O'Leary's arguments helped Henry Grattan with his proposal in 1788 to remove the tithe paid by Roman Catholics to the Church of Ireland, but this was voted down by the Parliament of Ireland.

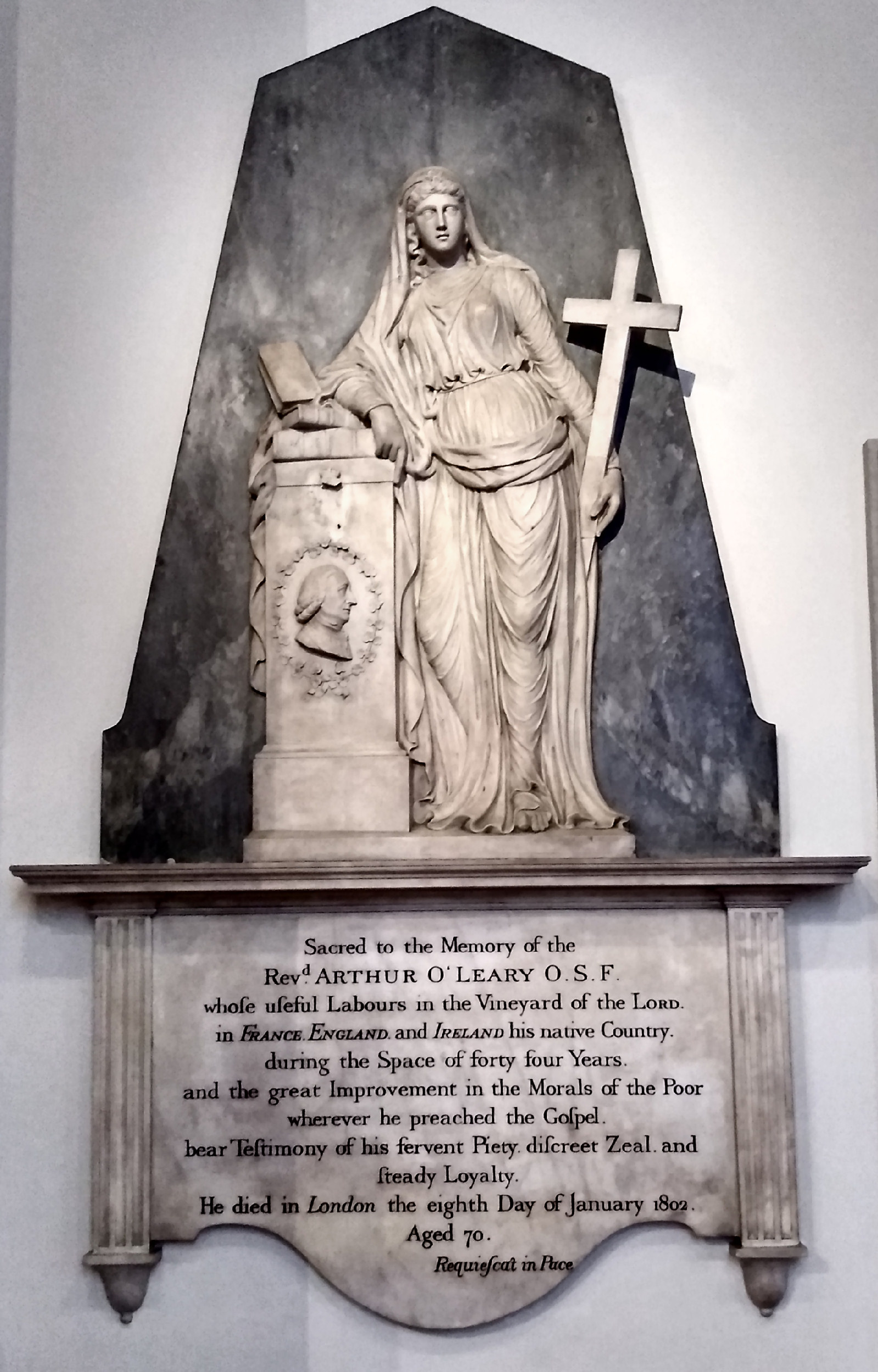
Memorial in St Patrick's Church, Soho Square

From 1789 till his death he was chaplain to the Spanish embassy in London. He was a wit, and socially acquainted with the circle of Edmund Burke, Richard Brinsley Sheridan, and Charles James Fox, and an honorary member of The Monks of the Screw. In the 1790s he built the original St Patrick's Church, Soho Square for the poor London Irish living around St Giles. He died in London and was buried in Old St Pancras Churchyard. His name is listed on the Burdett-Coutts Memorial to the eminent graves lost from the graveyard.

== Works ==
Famous as a preacher, writer, and controversialist, he published tracts characterized by learning, religious feeling, toleration, and allegiance to the Crown. His work for reform of the anti-Catholic penal laws was too heterodox for some Catholics. Formerly, Catholics had been loyal to the Jacobite movement, and some felt that O'Leary was being too friendly to the Hanoverian dynasty. He realised that an engagement with Protestants was necessary to ensure reforms from the British and Irish parliaments, whose members were all Protestant at that time. Reforms had just started with the Papists Act 1778 and the Roman Catholic Relief Act 1791.

During the 1790s he was, like many Catholics, horrified at the Dechristianisation of France during the French Revolution.

At the time when the penal laws were slowly being reformed, his aim was for Catholics in Britain and Ireland to achieve legal equality with Anglicans, and he was a precursor of those who finally obtained Catholic emancipation in 1829. Among his writings are:

- A Defence of the Divinity of Christ and the Immortality of the Soul
- Loyalty Asserted, or the Test Oath Vindicated
- An Address to the Roman Catholics Concerning the Apprehended Invasion of the French
- Essay on Toleration
- A Reply to John Wesley
