= Church of the Sacred Heart, Hove =

Church in England

Sacred Heart, Hove
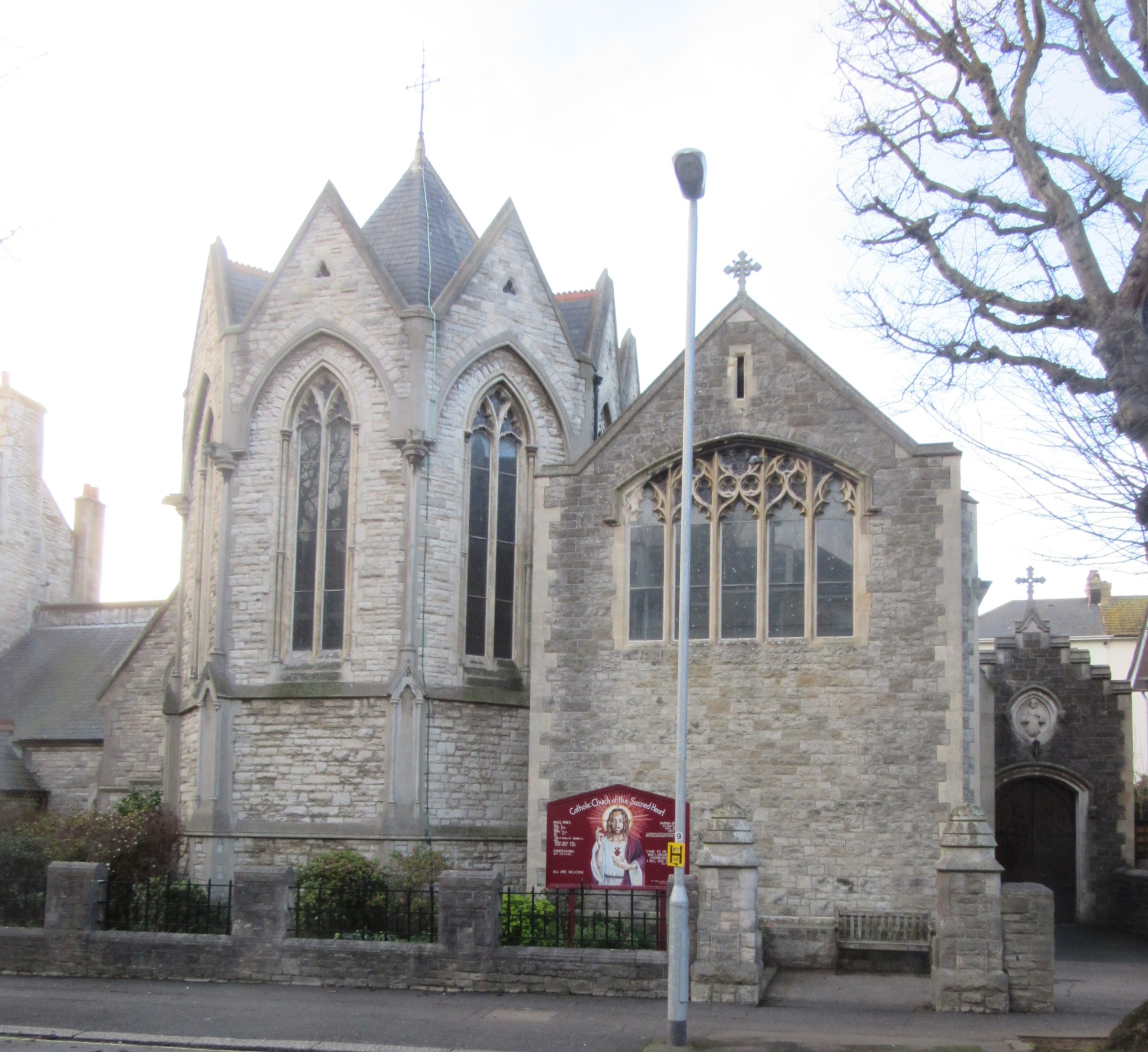
- The church from the east
- Sacred Heart, Hove
- 50.8298°N 0.1709°W
- OS grid reference: TQ 28909 04951
- Location: Norton Road, Hove, Brighton and Hove BN3 3BE
- Country: England
- Denomination: Roman Catholic
- Website: www.sacredhearthove.org.uk/

History
- Status: Parish church
- Founded: November 1880
- Dedication: Sacred Heart
- Dedicated: 28 September 1881
- Consecrated: 25 October 1887

Architecture
- Functional status: Active
- Heritage designation: Grade II listed
- Designated: 15 September 1999
- Architect(s): John Crawley; Joseph S. Hansom
- Style: Gothic Revival
- Completed: 1887

Administration
- Diocese: Arundel and Brighton
- Deanery: Brighton and Hove
- Parish: Hove, Sacred Heart

Clergy
- Priest: Rev Canon Colin Wolczak

The Church of the Sacred Heart is a Roman Catholic church in Hove, part of the English city of Brighton and Hove. It is the oldest of Hove's three Roman Catholic churches, and one of eleven in the city area. It has been designated a Grade II Listed building.

== History ==
Roman Catholic worship was prohibited in Britain between the time of the English Reformation and the late 18th century. At that time, some Acts of Parliament were passed to remove some of the restrictions. The Roman Catholic Relief Act 1791 allowed Roman Catholic churches to be built for the first time. In Hove's neighbour, Brighton, a community quickly established itself and built a permanent church, St John the Baptist's, in 1835. Hove's community took longer to become established; by the 1830s they were meeting secretly in a chapel established in a private house, but there had been no thought of building a permanent church.

The first plans were made in the 1870s, when the former priest in charge of St Mary Magdalen's Church in Brighton, Fr George Oldham, left money in his will for the establishment of a mission church. He died in 1875, and the decision to establish Hove's first church was made the following year. Finding a site was troublesome: the original choice, on Tisbury Road, was abandoned in favour of one opposite Hove Town Hall, which the Church authorities bought for £3,746 (£373,700 as of 2025).

Although an architect—John Crawley, a London-based ecclesiastical designer who had built several churches in Sussex and Hampshire—had been selected, not enough money was available to execute his proposed design immediately; and during the delay, the West Brighton Estate Company (which owned the surrounding land and the houses on it) complained about the supposed negative effect a Roman Catholic church would have on house prices. The Company bought the land back from the Church and agreed to help them find a new site; after Denmark Villas in the far northeast of Hove was considered and rejected, land on the west side of Norton Road was selected in October 1879. John Crawley's plans were approved a year later, and building work started on 3 November 1880 with the laying of the foundation stone.

Only part of the church could be built immediately, because not enough money was available at first. Nevertheless, by the time it officially opened on 28 September 1881, the Church of the Sacred Heart consisted of chancel, nave with north and south aisles, two side chapels and a presbytery. John Crawley died just before the opening; his architectural practice was taken over by Joseph S. Hansom, who carried out the second phase of building in 1887. This added to the nave at the west end, increasing the capacity. Rev Charles Dawes was the benefactor for this extension. More work was undertaken in 1914–1915 when the north aisle was extended and a Lady chapel was added. After this was opened on 24 February 1915, the church was officially finished. The land for this extension had been bought in 1911 for £400 (£40,700 as of 2025).

People associated with the church include the Irish stage actor Barry Sullivan, whose funeral was held there in May 1891; the journalist George Augustus Sala, whose funeral took place in 1895; composer Luigi Arditi, who worshipped here; and the sculptor, artist and designer Eric Gill, who converted to Roman Catholicism and was received into the Church here in 1913.

St Peter's Church in Portland Road, Aldrington was established as a daughter church in the early 20th century to serve an area of west Hove that was distant from any Roman Catholic churches. It was completed in 1915 and was initially within the Church of the Sacred Heart's parish before being given its own parish.

The Church of the Sacred Heart is licensed for worship in accordance with the Places of Worship Registration Act 1855 and has the registration number 25788.

== Architecture ==
The church is built of limestone with rock dressings. John Crawley's design was based on interpretation of the Early English Gothic style as it would have appeared in the 14th century. The chancel has an apse with three sides and runs through into the nave under the same roof, which is of slate quarried in Wales. The north aisle of the nave has the Lady chapel at the east end, while the south aisle has a chapel dedicated to Saint Joseph. The porch has an entrance in the east end. The window in the Lady chapel is particularly large, with five lights, and is in the Perpendicular style.

The chancel and side chapels have vaulted side-shafts in marble and stone. The internal arches and walls are built of brick, ashlar and stone, mostly quarried from southwest England. The nave roof is barrel-vaulted. The apse contains a large reredos. The pulpit has carvings of Saints Peter and Paul, and there is an alabaster font with tracery decoration. Nathaniel Westlake contributed many stained glass windows and some murals on the vaults including his last work, and local firm Cox & Barnard designed a single window in 2001. It depicts Saint Francis and is in the centre light of the three in the west window.

== Church organ and music ==
The original organ was a three-manual Bevington organ, but in 1996 or 1997 this was dismantled and removed. The Copeman Hart firm built a replacement, and Andrew Reid—the assistant organist at Westminster Cathedral at the time—attended an inauguration ceremony in December 1998. The two-manual, 41-stop instrument is used for recitals as well as during Masses.

There has been a long tradition of choral singing at the Sacred Heart. The choir archives contain scores for Mozart and Haydn Masses, printed around 1870. One of the early Directors Of Music in the 1890s was the then well known composer Augustus Edmonds Tozer, compiler of the Complete Benediction Manual, Catholic Hymns (1886), Catholic Choralist (1889), Modern Music For Church Choirs (1889) and composer of the Mass of St Wilfred, the Mass of the Most Blessed Sacrament and several sacred pieces.

== The church today ==
The Church of the Sacred Heart was designated a Grade II Listed building on 15 September 1999.

There are three Masses on Sundays (and an evening Vigil service on the preceding Saturday), daily Masses during the week and three services on Holy Days of Obligation. The Sacrament of Penance is offered on Saturdays.

The 9.30am Mass on Sunday is a family service with contemporary worship music by the Sacred Heart Youth Choir. The Sunday Mass at 11.30am (Missa normativa) is celebrated in English and Latin, and the music includes both Gregorian Chant and the Polyphony of the Renaissance. On most Sundays, the choir sings plainsong and is accompanied by the congregation. Settings used from the Kyriale include the Cum Jubilo, Lux et Origo, de Angelis and Orbis Factor. Mass settings by major composers are used on feast days and Holy Days of Obligation.

The church is one of eleven Roman Catholic churches in Brighton and Hove. Its former daughter church St Peter's Church in Aldrington and St George's Church in the suburb of West Blatchington are also in Hove; there are six in Brighton, and one each in Rottingdean and Woodingdean.

== See also ==
- Grade II listed buildings in Brighton and Hove: C–D
- List of places of worship in Brighton and Hove

== Bibliography ==
- Dale, Antony (1989). Brighton Churches. London: Routledge. ISBN 0-415-00863-8.
- Elleray, D. Robert (2004). Sussex Places of Worship. Worthing: Optimus Books. ISBN 0-9533132-7-1.
- Grove, George (1999). Dictionary of Music and Musicians. Oxford: Oxford University Press. ISBN 0-19-517067-9.
- Martin, Margaret (1999). History of the Sacred Heart Church, Hove. Brighton: To Follow.
- Middleton, Judy (2002). The Encyclopaedia of Hove & Portslade. Brighton: Brighton & Hove Libraries.
