= All Saints' Church, Petersham, London =

former All Saints' Church, Petersham
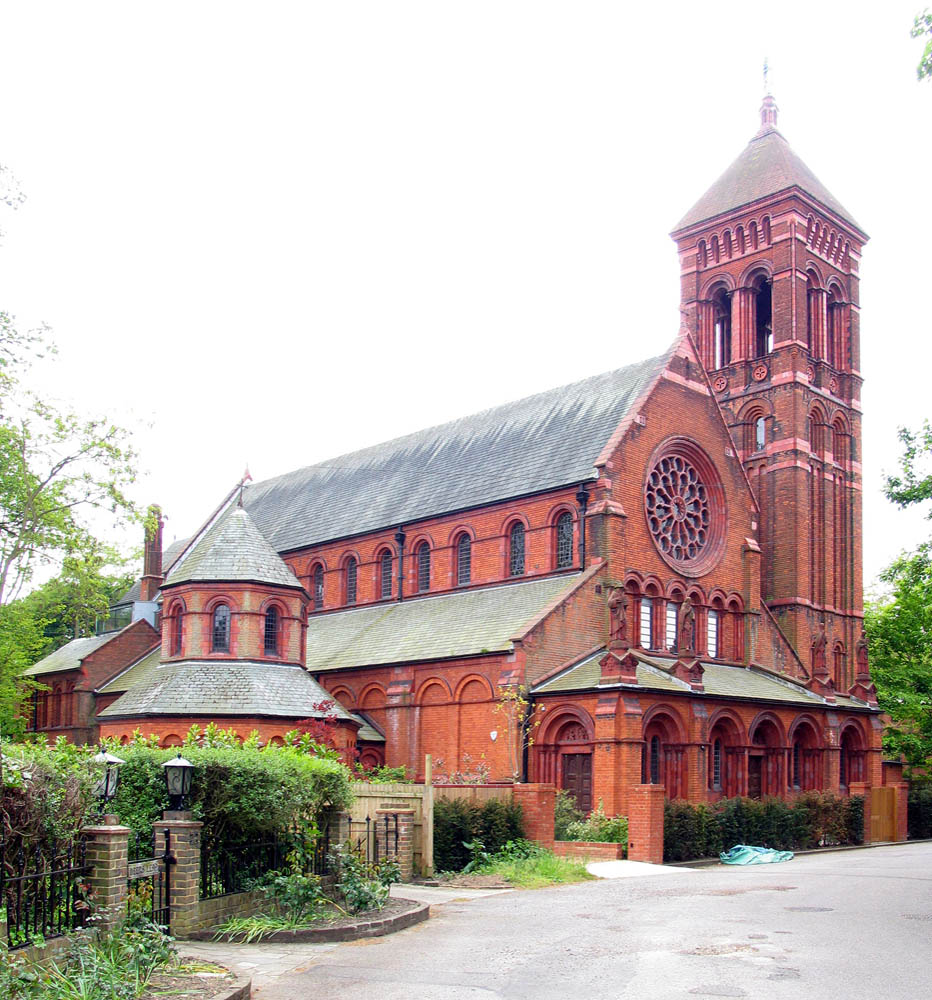
- former All Saints' Church, Petersham
- 51.4436°N 0.3001°W
- Location: Bute Avenue, Petersham, Richmond TW10 7AX (London Borough of Richmond upon Thames)
- Country: England
- Denomination: Church of England

History
- Status: ceased to be used as a church in 1986
- Founded: 1899
- Founder: Rachael Laetitia Ward
- Dedicated: 1909
- Consecrated: never consecrated

Architecture
- Functional status: now a private residence
- Architect: John Kelly
- Architectural type: Romanesque Revival
- Completed: 1909

Administration
- Diocese: Southwark

Listed Building – Grade II
- Official name: Church of All Saints, Bute Avenue
- Designated: 25 June 1983
- Reference no.: 1065334

All Saints' Church, Petersham, in Bute Avenue, Petersham, in the London Borough of Richmond upon Thames, is a Grade II listed former church which is now used as a private residence.

== History ==
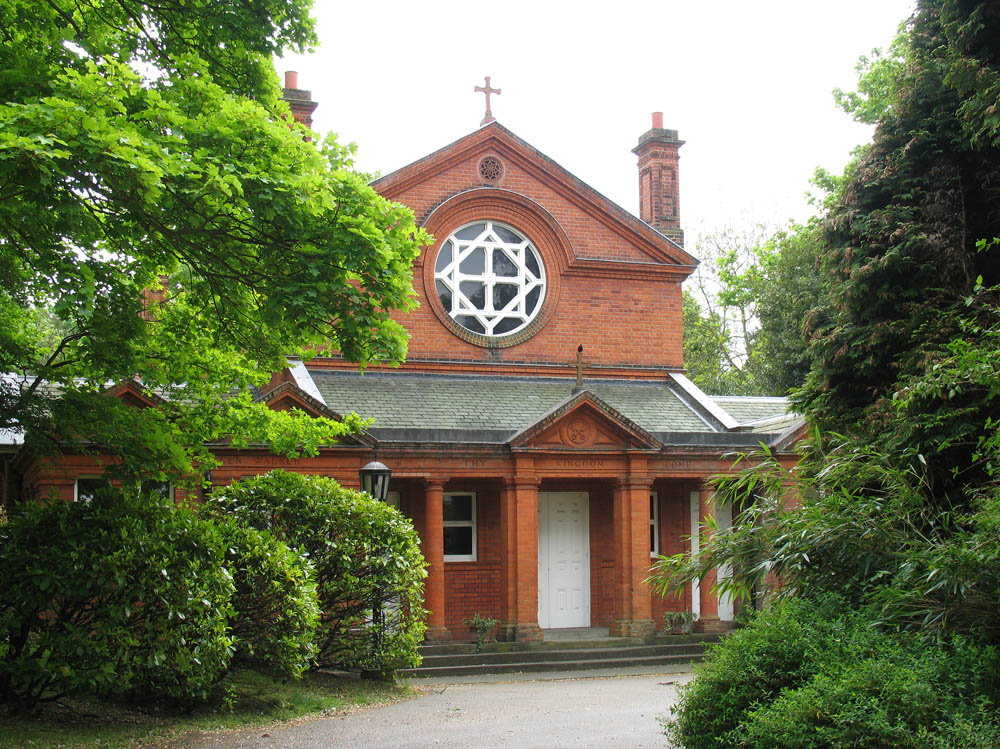
The church hall, used until the early 21st century as Petersham's village hall

Designed by Leeds architect John Kelly, the church was commissioned in 1899 by Rachel Laetitia Warde (née Walker) (1841–1906) to accommodate the expected suburban expansion of Petersham and, using funds from his estate, as a memorial to her father, Samuel Walker (1812–1898) who had died the previous year. She also commissioned an accompanying church hall and institute as a memorial to her aunt Ellen. The frieze above the hall's front entrance has the inscription "AD 1900. Ellen Walker Thy Kingdom Come. Memorial Church Room".

However, Mrs Warde died three years before the project was finished and it was completed by her son Lionel (1876–1963). The church's foundation stone was laid in November 1901 and the church was dedicated by the Bishop of Kingston, Cecil Hook, in April 1909.

The church, and the church hall and institute (which is also Grade II listed), were erected in the grounds of Bute House (previously the residence of British Prime Minister John Stuart, 3rd Earl of Bute, and which was demolished in 1908).

The church was never consecrated as the anticipated growth in Petersham's population did not take place. However, it was used occasionally by the parish and also by the Greek Orthodox Church. It continued to be used for weddings until 1981 but ceased to be used as a church in 1986.

During the Second World War it was requisitioned and used as a radar and anti-aircraft command post. It was also used as a recording studio and as a location for filming. In January 1976, Luciano Pavarotti recorded his best-selling O Holy Night album (reissued as a CD in 1990) at the church. Other recordings made at the church include an album of songs by Alexander Borodin and Alexander Dargomizhsky, performed by Sergei Leiferkus, Semion Skigin, and Leonid Gorokhov, and recordings by John McCabe and by Christopher Hogwood and the Academy of Ancient Music. Other artists who have recorded there include Vladimir Ashkenazy, Dimitri Ashkenazy, and Vovka Ashkenazy.

The Anglican Diocese of Southwark sold the church building in about 1996. It is now a private residence, known as All Saints House, and has been converted to include an indoor swimming pool, a jacuzzi and a steam room.

The church hall was used as Petersham's village hall until the early 21st century.

== Architecture ==
The church was built in red brick and terracotta in the style of a basilica. The campanile (bell tower) is 118 feet high, with a pyramidal roof crowned by a figure of Christ overlooking Richmond Park. Bridget Cherry and Nikolaus Pevsner described the architectural style as "[e]mphatically Italian Early Christian or Romanesque", the interior as "lavish" and the baptistery as "quite exceptional". The nave had a grey and white marble central aisle taken from Tournai Cathedral in Belgium. To the north was an octagonal baptistery including a tank for total immersion. The altar, which was raised to a considerable height above the floor of the nave, had a tall reredos and rood.
