= Sacred Heart Church, Teddington =

Coordinates: 51.4189°N 0.3170°W

Sacred Heart Teddington
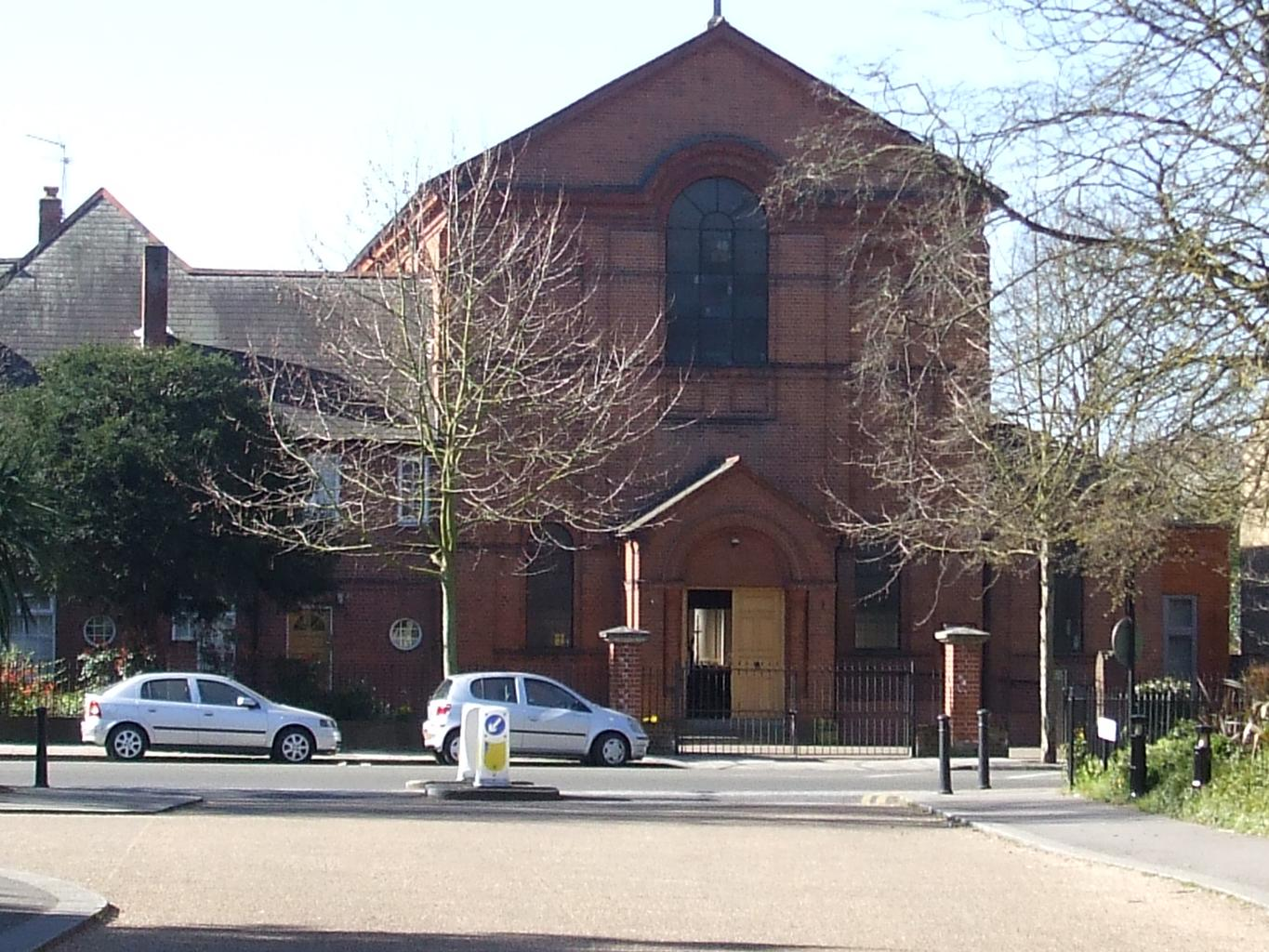
- Sacred Heart Church viewed from Langdon Park

- Location of church within the London Borough of Richmond upon Thames
- Location: Teddington
- Country: England
- Denomination: Roman Catholic
- Website: sacredheartteddington.wordpress.com/

History
- Status: Church
- Founded: 1893
- Dedication: Sacred Heart of Jesus
- Consecrated: 14 June 1944
- Events: Extended 1934–35, adding presbytery

Architecture
- Functional status: Active
- Architect: John Kelly
- Style: Classical
- Completed: 1893

Administration
- Province: Westminster
- Archdiocese: Westminster
- Deanery: Upper Thames
- Parish: Teddington and Hampton Wick

Clergy
- Archbishop: Most Rev. Vincent Nichols
- Priest: Fr. Stephen Beale

Sacred Heart Church is a Roman Catholic church and parish in Teddington, southwest London, that serves the Catholic community of Teddington and Hampton Wick. It is in the Upper Thames Deanery of the Roman Catholic Archdiocese of Westminster and is situated at 262 Kingston Road, approximately midway between the junctions with Kingston Bridge and Teddington Lock Footbridge.

== History ==
From the late 18th century there were linen-bleaching works located in the fields along the banks of the nearby River Thames, now the site of Teddington Studios, Lensbury Club and Teddington School. There were one or two Roman Catholic families associated with these works. A temporary Roman Catholic chapel was first opened in Hampton Wick in 1882. In 1884 a Roman Catholic school was built in Fairfax Road, South Teddington. Named Chantry House, the ground floor was used for the school whilst the first floor served as a chapel until the church was built.

The classical style brick church with stone dressings was designed by John Kelly, of Leeds firm Kelly & Birchall, who also designed several other contemporary churches in the area. The church opened in 1893 with seating for up to 200 people. It comprised five bays with nave, aisles, and a short apsidal chancel. In 1934–35, under Fr Philip Foley, the church was extended westwards, adding a further two bays to accommodate a presbytery.

== Parish ==
The parish of Teddington and Hampton Wick is bounded in the east and south by the river Thames from a point north of Teddington Lock to a point midway between Kingston Bridge and Hampton Court Bridge to the south roughly opposite Thames Ditton Marina. The western boundary extends northwards through Home Park and Bushy Park, then along the A309 road to Teddington Park Road which forms the northern boundary eastwards to the river.

The school was managed by a small convent of three or four Sisters of Charity of St. Paul, established in Hampton Wick about 1885. The convent also ran a separate convent school, St Paul's Convent School, at 253 Kingston Road. In 1910 the sisters moved St. Paul's Convent to premises next to the church in Kingston Road. In 1957 there were eight sisters. The parish school, Sacred Heart Primary School, moved from Chantry house to its present location in St Marks Road to the north of the church in 1963.

Under Fr John Deehan the parish hall in Fairfax Road was sold in 2006 and the proceeds used towards the construction of the church's community rooms in 2006.
