= St Patrick's Church, Soho Square =

Large Catholic house of worship in London

Coordinates: 51.5154°N 0.1314°W

St Patrick's Church
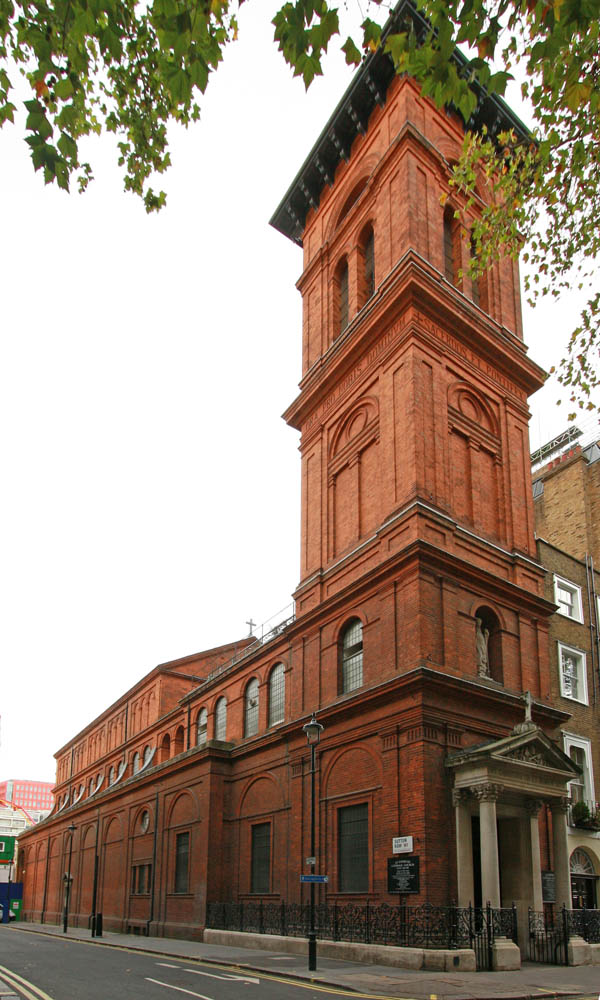
- Exterior of St Patrick's Church
- St Patrick's Church
- Address: 21a Soho Square, London, W1D 4NR
- Country: United Kingdom
- Denomination: Roman Catholic
- Website: www.stpatricksoho.org

History
- Status: Church
- Founder: Arthur O'Leary
- Dedication: Saint Patrick
- Consecrated: 29 September 1792; 20 September 1900

Architecture
- Architect: John Kelly
- Style: Italian Renaissance
- Groundbreaking: 18 June 1891
- Completed: 17 March 1893

Administration
- Archdiocese: Westminster
- Diocese: Westminster

Clergy
- Priest: Alexander Sherbrooke

St Patrick's Church is a large Roman Catholic parish church in Soho Square, London. St Pat's (as it is informally known) was consecrated as a chapel in a building behind Carlisle House on 29 September 1792, one of the first Catholic buildings allowed in Great Britain after the Reformation.

The present church building was built between 1891 and 1893, to designs by John Kelly of Leeds, and replaced the earlier and smaller chapel built by Father Arthur O'Leary in the 1790s. The church has an unusual longish shape due to plot constrictions given at that time. The building is constructed out of bricks with a bell-tower. It is Grade II* listed. The main entrance has a Roman-style porch with Corinthian columns. Above the entrance is an inscription: VT CHRISTIANI ITA ET ROMANI SITIS ("Ut christiani ita et romani sitis", i.e. “Be ye Christians as those of the Roman Church”). It is a quotation taken from the writings of St. Patrick.

The building was closed for renovation and refurbishment between 28 February 2010 and 31 May 2011. During the renovations, services were held in the nearby Chapel of St Barnabas, at The House of St Barnabas.

== Gallery ==
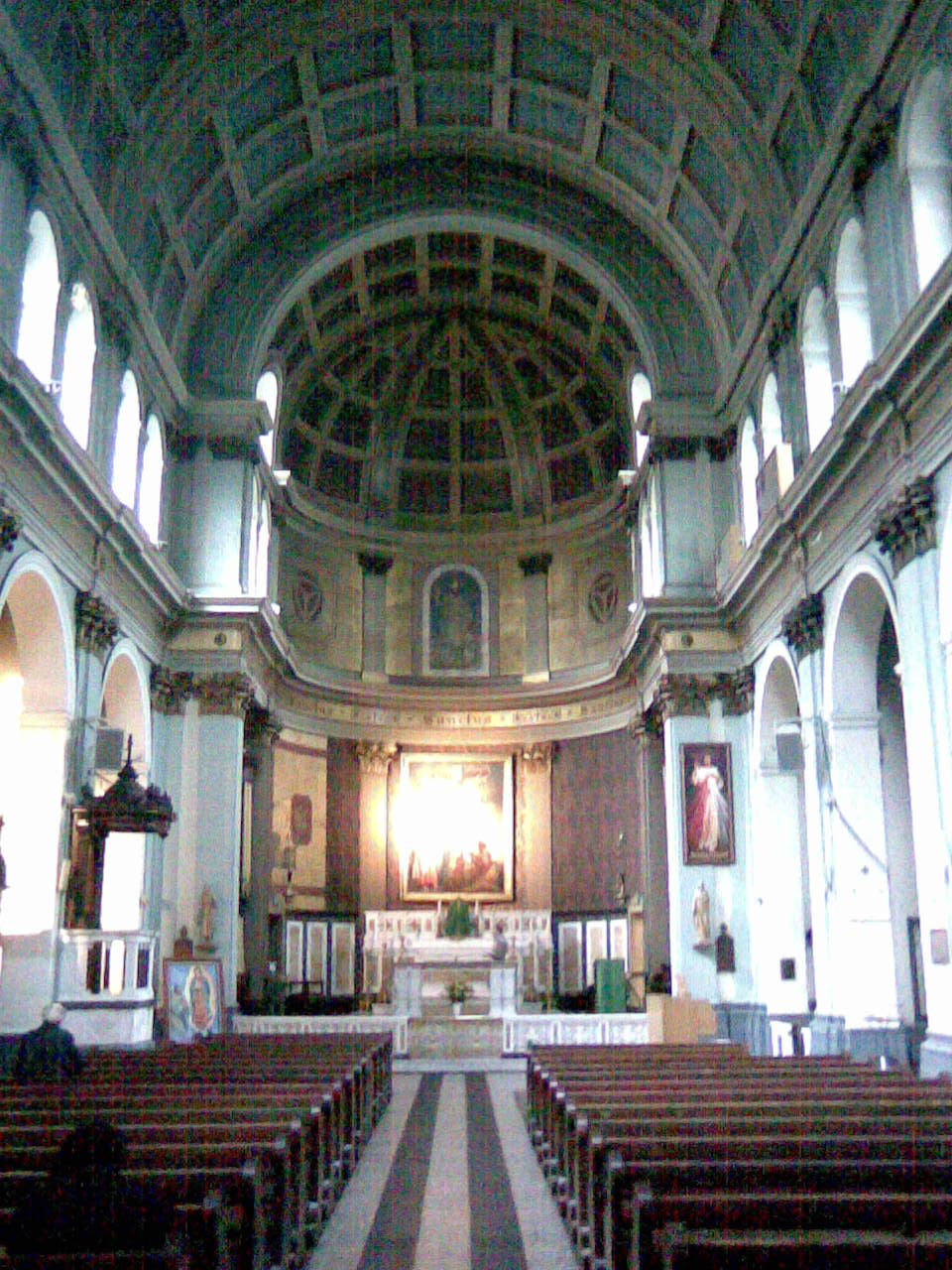
Interior of St Patrick's Church prior to renovation

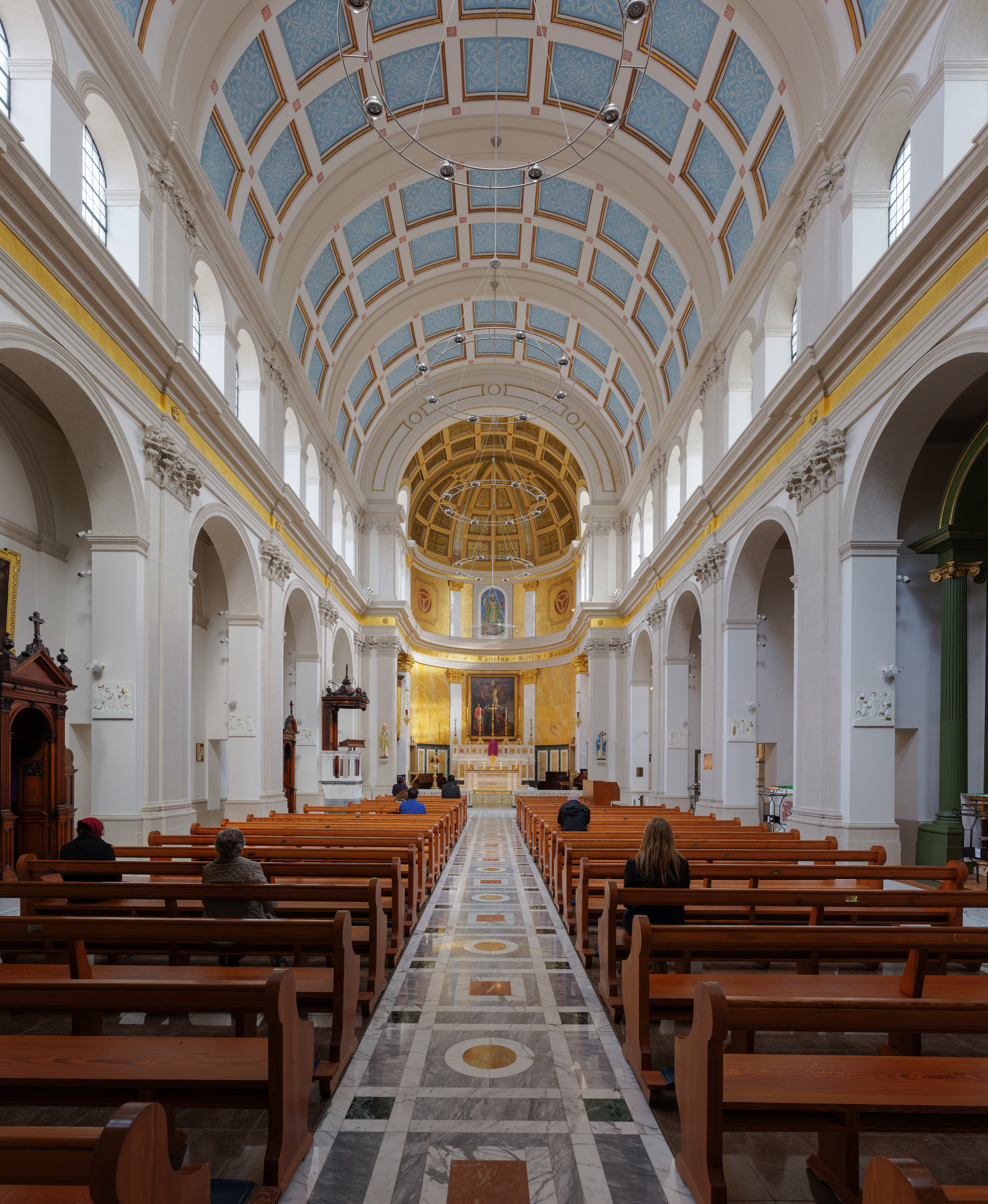
Interior following renovation and refurbishment

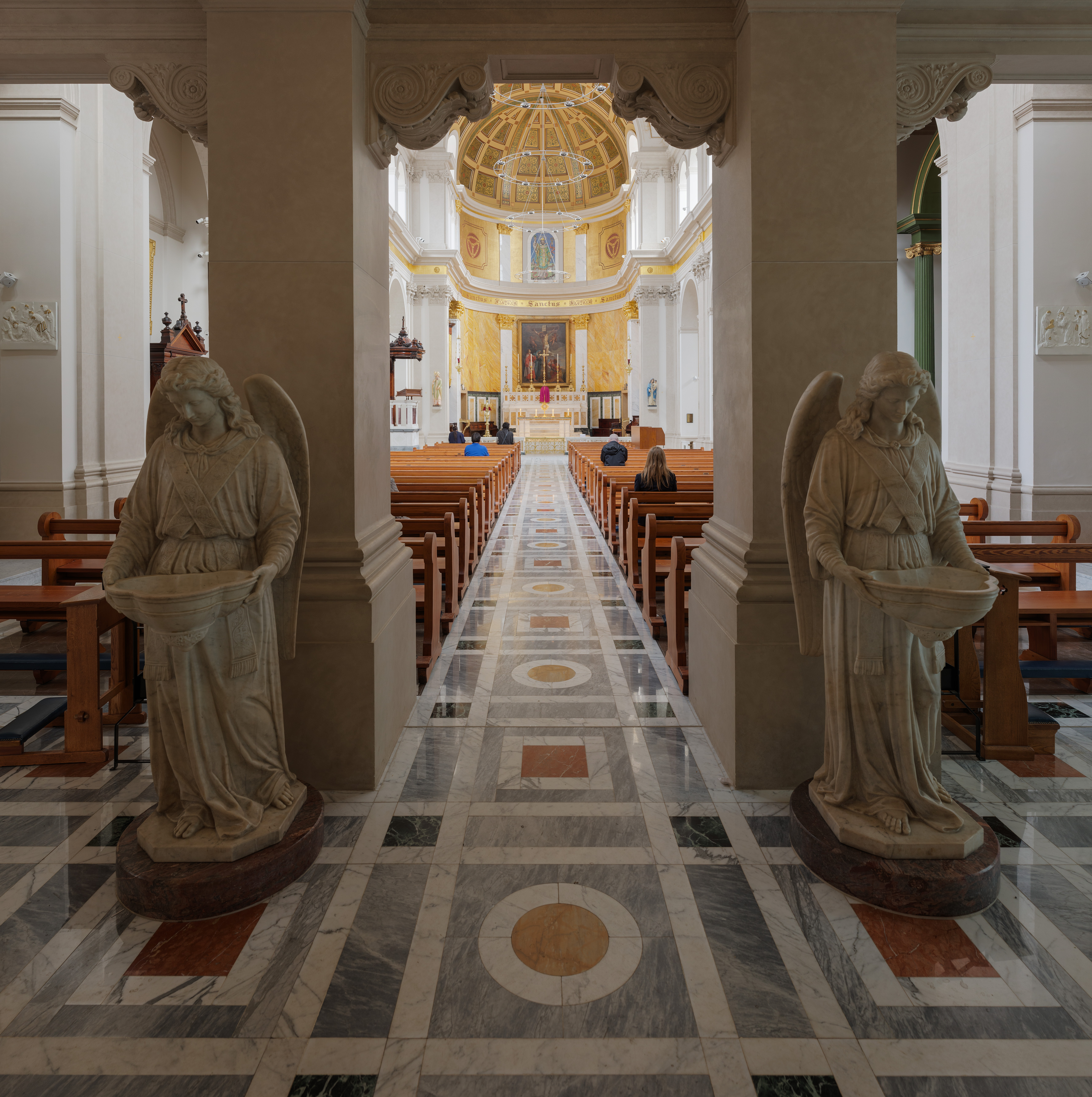
The entrance to the nave
