= East Street Arts =

East Street Arts is a registered charity in England, established to facilitate the development of visual artists. The charity was set up in 1993 by Karen Watson and Jon Wakeman to provide space, services, facilities, opportunities and support for visual artists. East Street Arts operates four sites in Leeds, England: Patrick Studios (ESA headquarters), Barkston Studios, Union 105 and other offsite projects.

== Photography competition ==
A competition held in conjunction with Exposure Leeds "to take a series of photographs to capture 21st Century Leeds.". Winning entries will be exhibited at Dysons Chambers on Lower Briggate, Leeds, England. 14 artists have been shortlisted.
