= St Michael's, Fulwell =

Coordinates: 51.4335°N 0.3477°W

St Michael's Fulwell
- Parish of St Michael and St George
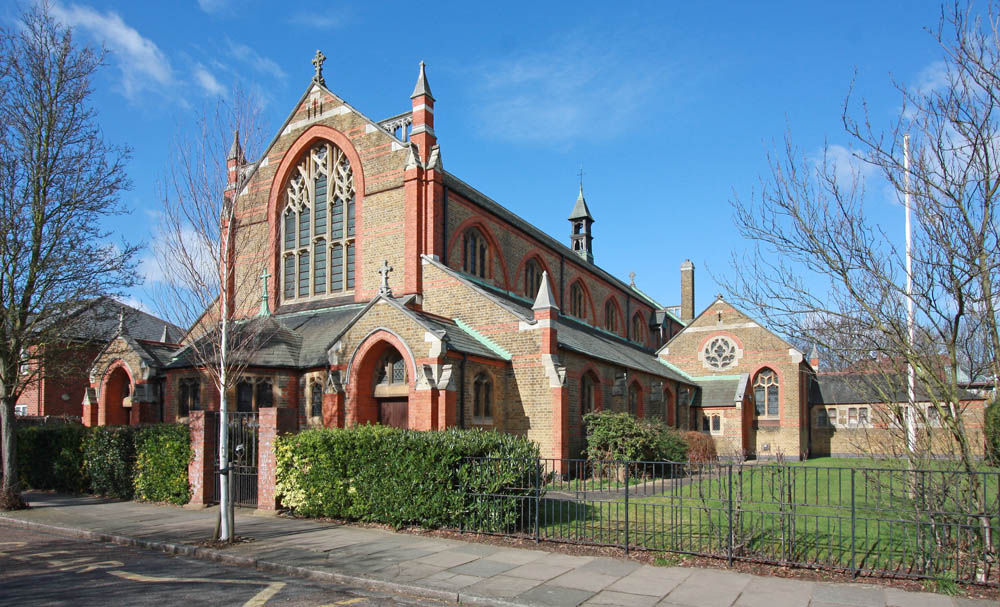
- St Michael's Fulwell
- OS grid reference: TQ 14951 71798
- Location: Fulwell, Teddington, London
- Country: England
- Denomination: Church of England Anglican
- Website: https://www.stmichaelsfulwell.co.uk/

History
- Founded: 1913; reopened 2015

Architecture
- Functional status: Active
- Heritage designation: Grade II Listed
- Architect: J S Adkins
- Closed: 2000–14

Administration
- Province: Canterbury
- Diocese: Diocese of London
- Archdeaconry: Middlesex
- Deanery: Hampton
- Parish: St Michael & St George Fulwell; formerly St Peter & St Paul Teddington with St Michael & St George Fulwell

Clergy
- Bishop(s): The Rt Revd Dr Emma Ineson, Bishop of Kensington; The Rt Revd & Rt Hon Dame Sarah Mulally, Bishop of London;
- Vicar(s): The Revd Ed Kendall; The Revd Simon Pedley (Associate Vicar)

St Michael's Fulwell is a Grade II listed Church of England church on Wilcox Road in Fulwell, a neighbourhood of Teddington in the London Borough of Richmond upon Thames. Founded in 1913, it closed from 2000 to 2014 and re-opened with a new congregation in early 2015.

== History ==
The Parish Church of St Michael & St George Fulwell opened in 1913 having been built to a design by architect J S Adkins. Adkins worked collaboratively on a number of church buildings, but St Michael's is unique in being solely his work. In style it combines Gothic Revival, Perpendicular, and Arts and Crafts influences.

In the 1980s the rear section of the nave was separated off to create a balcony, upstairs meeting room, downstairs kitchen, entrance narthex, and storage areas.

In March 1990 the parish was united with St Peter & St Paul Teddington as one benefice.

In November 2000 St Michael's was closed. Most interior fittings, decorations and utilities were removed, the vicarage sold off, and the building lay disused and deteriorating for 15 years, with its future uncertain.

== Reopening ==
The re-opening of St Michael's in 2015 was led by a team from St Peter's Fulham, joined by others locally from Teddington, Twickenham and Hampton. The Bishop of Kensington, the Rt Revd Paul Williams invited the Revd Ed Kendall to re-establish a congregation, and oversaw the support of local churches. Support for the plant also came from the Co-Mission network.

The church launched its Sunday morning services in January 2015, with a vision to "rebuild a gospel-centred community for Fulwell, Teddington and beyond". Soon after, the evening service was added. The church refurbished the side-chapel and some side-rooms where almost all the services and activities initially took place. In 2016 these was deemed too small for the growing morning congregation and so a temporary indoor marquee was put up in the main part of the church during winter months in order to provide a meeting space which retained some heat.

In 2017 the "Regenerate" project was launched, with the aim of refurbishing the rest of the building. Four years of fund raising and design work followed.

In 2019 the Parish of St Michael & St George Fulwell was reinstated, being separated off once again from St Peter & St Paul Teddington. Further parts of the Parish of St Peter & St Paul were later added when that church became an "extra-parochial place".

The main contracted building works for "Regenerate" took place from August 2021 until July 2022, during which time the congregation met temporarily at St Peter & St Paul Teddington. A Service of Thanksgiving for the completion of the work was held on Thursday 13 October 2022, at which the Rt Revd Dr Ric Thorpe, Bishop of Islington led prayers of rededication of the church.

== Services ==
The church meets on Sundays at 10:30 am for a family service, and at 5.15 pm for an informal evening service.
