= St Peter & St Paul, Teddington =

Coordinates: 51.4263°N 0.3360°W

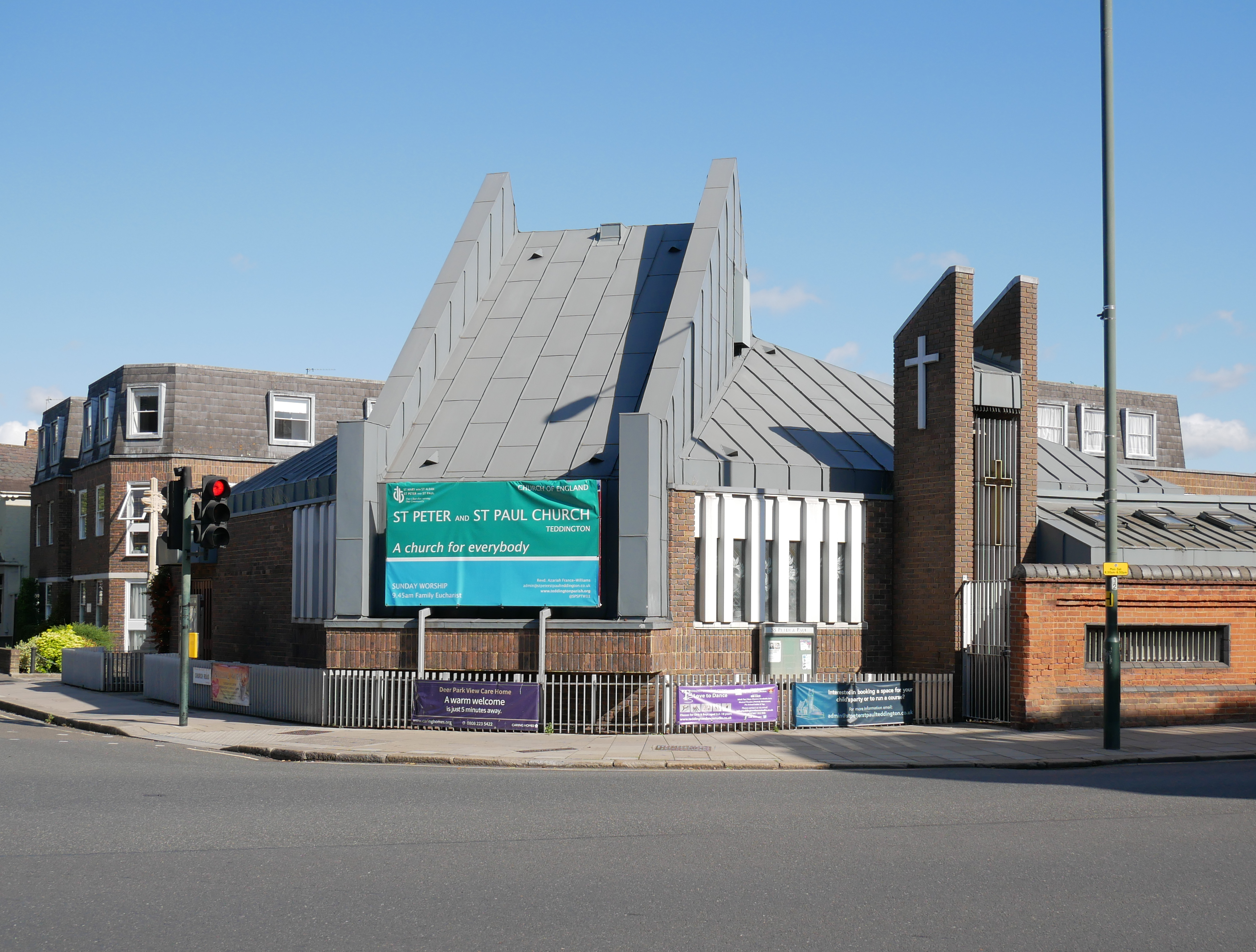
- St Peter & St Paul, Teddington
- Location: Teddington, London
- Country: England
- Denomination: Anglican

History
- Status: Parish church

Administration
- Province: Canterbury
- Diocese: Diocese of London
- Archdeaconry: Middlesex
- Deanery: Hampton

St Peter & St Paul, Teddington is a Church of England church at Bychurch End in Teddington, in the London Borough of Richmond upon Thames. It was formerly a parish church but in 2020 became an extra-parochial place. Now known as 'The Peter and Paul Centre', it is being run as a mission hub for Teddington, by a board of trustees from neighbouring parishes St Mary with St Alban and St Michael's Fulwell, and from the Diocese of London.

The original church was built in 1865 on the corner of Broad Street and Church Street, opposite the current church. It was needed to serve the western side of Teddington as the town's population grew, while the much older parish of St Mary with St Alban continued to serve the eastern side.

In 1913 the parish of St Michael's Fulwell was created in the north western part of the parish of St Peter & St Paul, to serve the growing residential district there. The two churches were combined for a time as a united benefice in 1990.

Heavily damaged during the Second World War, the decision was taken in the 1970s to demolish the Victorian church and build a new one on the current site.
