= Fulwell, London =

Suburb of west London

Coordinates: 51.4345°N 0.3475°W

Fulwell
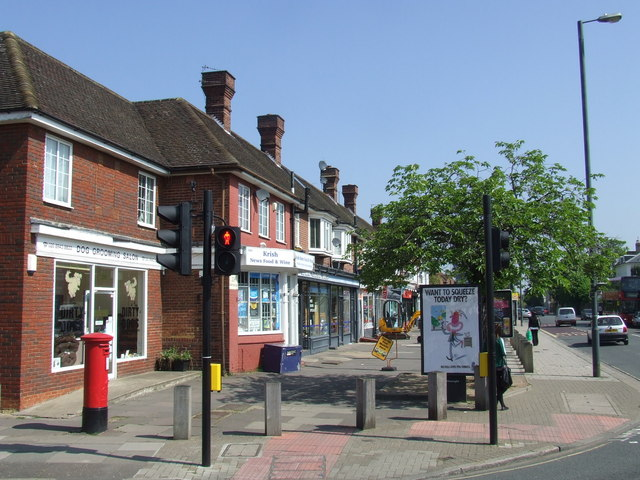
- Hampton Road, Fulwell

- Location within Greater London
- Population: 10,131 (2011 Census. Fulwell and Hampton Hill Ward)
- OS grid reference: TQ149719
- London borough: Richmond
- Ceremonial county: Greater London
- Region: London
- Country: England
- Sovereign state: United Kingdom
- Post town: TWICKENHAM
- Postcode district: TW2
- Post town: TEDDINGTON
- Postcode district: TW11
- Post town: HAMPTON
- Postcode district: TW12
- Dialling code: 020
- Police: Metropolitan
- Fire: London
- Ambulance: London
- UK Parliament: Twickenham
- London Assembly: South West

Fulwell is a neighbourhood of outer West London in the London Borough of Richmond upon Thames. It straddles the west of the "ancient" parish and urban district borders of Twickenham and Teddington.

The area is not a postal district. There are two busy crossroads in the area: Hospital Bridge Road and Sixth Cross Road meet where they cross Staines Road (Twickenham), and where Sixth Cross Road, Hampton Road, South Road and Wellington Road all meet. Sixth Cross Road is one of six similarly named roads between Staines Road and Hampton Road, commencing with First Cross Road at Twickenham Green. There is a post office named Fulwell Park at the corner of Staines Road and Hospital Bridge Road. There are two pubs in Fulwell proper, on the corners of Staines and Sixth Cross Roads and Hampton and South Roads, and there is a large garden centre at the corner of Sixth Cross and Wellington Roads.

Fulwell has an Anglican parish church, St Michael's, which, after a 15-year closure, was reopened for worship in 2014 and regained parish status in 2019.

== Place name ==
The name is first known in documents of the fifteenth century. It may be from a reliably full well or a corruption of foul well. Until 1965, Fulwell was in the historic county of Middlesex.

The place name is used in Richmond Borough Council's electoral district (ward) name, Fulwell and Hampton Hill, In 2009, a proposal to remove Fulwell from the electoral ward name was rejected.

Fulwell railway station, Fulwell Golf Course, Fulwell bus garage, Fulwell Park Avenue (Twickenham, TW2) and Fulwell Road (Teddington, TW11) all use the place name.

== History ==
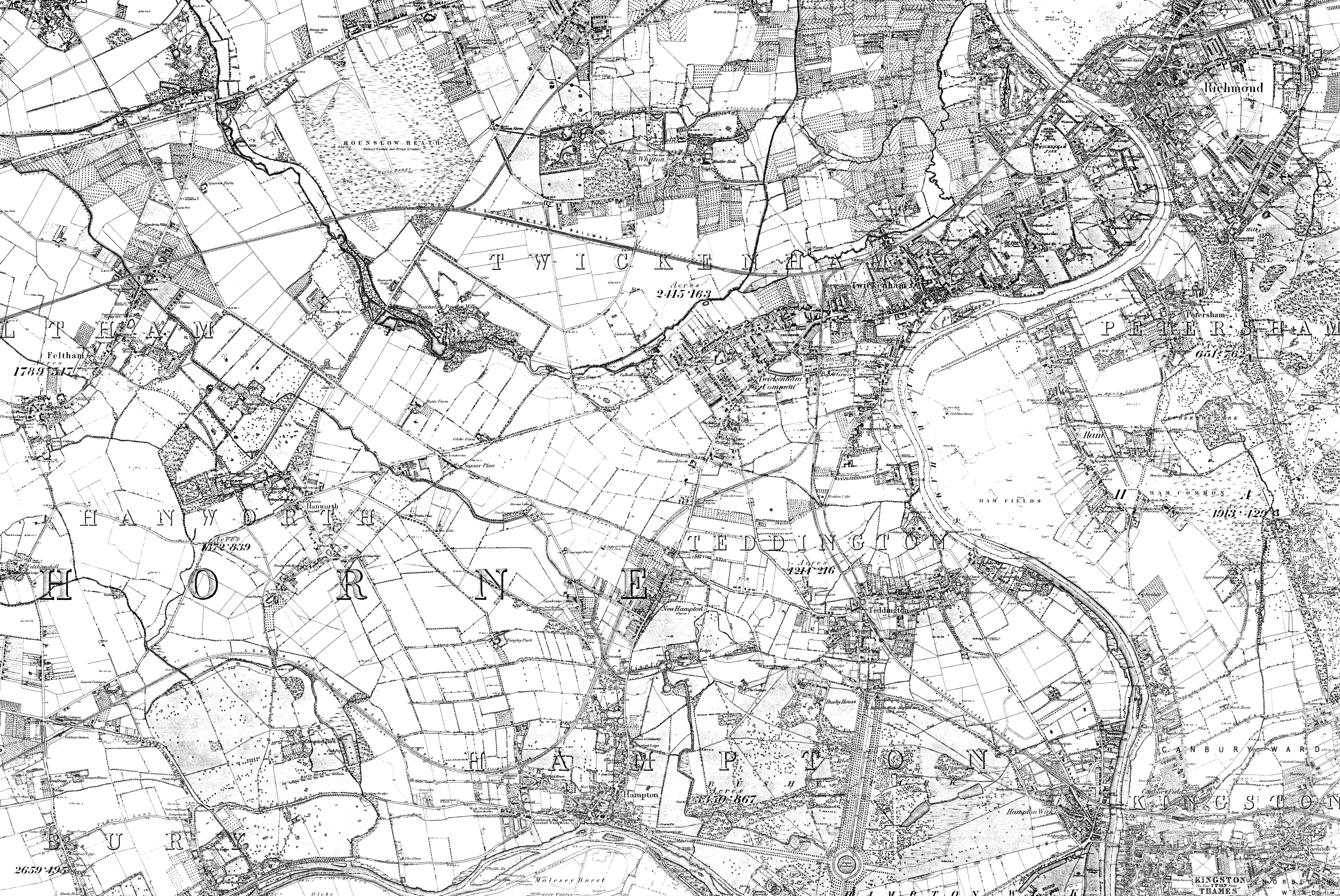
The farm, mills, and lodge bear the Fulwell name in the 1871 to 1882 map series (OS, 1st series 1:10560, Map of Surrey (extends to near parts of Middlesex)).

Fulwell has migrated south, and/or reduced in size, as maps from the late nineteenth century showed it spanning onto the north bank of the Crane, which lies in Whitton. It formed the southern extent of Hounslow Heath and the near-surface raised Taplow gravel that defined it. A reference to assarts at Fulwell dating from around 1200 are amongst the earliest records of the name. The area was progressively enclosed for agriculture and was increasingly urbanised, beginning in the Victorian period of metropolitan expansion of outer London.

Although the Fulwell area was historically in Middlesex, in 1965 it became a part of the London Borough of Richmond in the newly formed ceremonial county of Greater London. Until 1965, it was in the Municipal Borough of Twickenham.

=== Fulwell Lodge and Fulwell Park ===
Fulwell Lodge was a grand house, dating from the early 17th century, located north of the Staines Road, at the western end of what was then Twickenham parish, with Yorke/Fulwell Farm to its north. In 1871 Charles James Freake, a London property developer, bought Fulwell Lodge, its grounds and estate worker's cottages. His estate extended south from the A316 Chertsey Road and River Crane, and included the areas now known as Twickenham Green and Strawberry Hill, encompassing what are now Strawberry Hill Golf Course and Fulwell Golf Course. It extended to Apex Corner where the A312 Uxbridge Road now meets the A316, and was bounded to the South-East by the Shepperton Branch Line. Freake named the area Fulwell Park. After Freake's death in 1884, ownership of the estate passed to his wife, Eliza Pudsey. After her death in 1900, the land was held by Freake Estates, who leased some of it to establish Fulwell Golf Course in 1904. In 1910, the exiled last King of Portugal, Manuel II, bought Fulwell Lodge as his English home, owning it until his death in 1932.

The lodge and its acres of grounds were then bought by a construction company, Wates, and demolished. The area was redeveloped as housing, with some low-rise, landscaped-grounds flats. Its history is acknowledged through street names: Manoel Road, Lisbon Avenue, Augusta Road and Portugal Gardens.

== Public transport ==
Fulwell bus garage was built in 1902 as a hub for trams, trolley cars, and buses. The depot also acquired the title of the top London bus garage of 2018.

Apart from train services at Fulwell railway station, Transport for London has bus routes 33, 267, 281, 290, 481, 490, H22, and R70 serving the area. Both the 33 and 267 terminate at the garage in Stanley Road, the 33 coming up Stanley Road from Teddington, the 267 via Hampton and South Roads from Twickenham. The 281 runs via Hampton, South and Stanley Roads, the 290 runs via Hampton, Sixth Cross and Staines Roads (towards Hanworth), the 481 via Hospital Bridge, Sixth Cross, South and Stanley Roads, the 490 straight along Staines Road, the H22 via Hospital Bridge and Staines Roads (towards Twickenham), and the R70 along Hampton and Wellington Roads. Four different bus stops in the area are used as driver change points; for the 281 in South Road, the 290 in Hampton Road, the 490 in Staines Road, and the R70 in Wellington Road.
