= Teddington Baptist Church =

- Teddington Baptist Church
- 51°25′37″N 0°20′15″W
- Location: 17 Church Road, Teddington, TW11 8PF
- Country: England
- Denomination: Baptist
- Website: www.teddingtonbaptist.org.uk

History
- Dedicated: 21 November 1894 (original building)

Clergy
- Pastor: Rev Oliver McMullen

Teddington Baptist Church is an evangelical Baptist church in Teddington in the London Borough of Richmond upon Thames.

The first members of the church met in a rented room in 1877. The church was officially established in 1881.

The premises were remodelled in 2004 with a new glass atrium and front area. Since the remodelling, the church has hosted a wider range of community activities.

The current minister is Rev John Gleghorn and its associate minister is Rev Oliver McMullen, both of whom joined the church in autumn 2019. John Gleghorn succeeded Rev Richard Littledale, who was the minister of the church from 1997 to 2016. Richard Littledale left in July 2016 to become the minister of Newbury Baptist Church.
