= Teddington Methodist Church =

Church in Teddington, England

Teddington Methodist Church and Community Centre
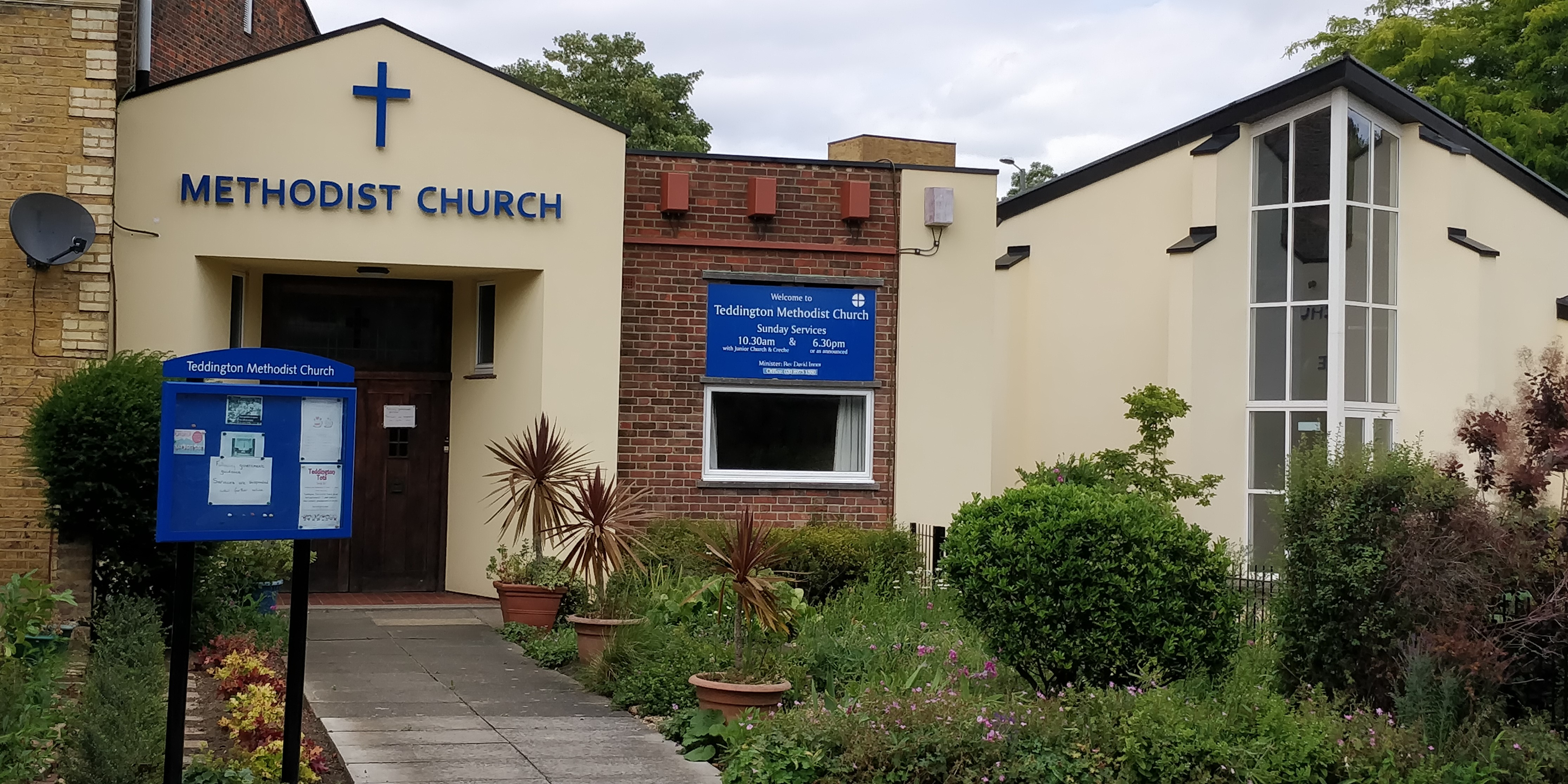
- Teddington Methodist Church and Community Centre
- 51°25′36.8″N 0°20′27.3″W
- Location: 1 Stanley Road, Teddington TW11 8TP
- Country: England
- Denomination: Methodist
- Website: www.teddingtonmethodistchurch.org.uk

Architecture
- Years built: 1952 (current building)

Administration
- Diocese: Teddington Methodist Circuit

Teddington Methodist Church and Community Centre is a Methodist church on Stanley Road, Teddington in the London Borough of Richmond upon Thames.

The first Teddington Methodist Church was situated in Clarence Road. Built in 1859, it was later known as Craig Hall and has been redeveloped as housing. A new building on the site was opened in 1879. It was demolished by a Second World War bomb in 1944 and rebuilt in 1952.

The church's minister is David Innes.
