= St Alban's Church, Teddington =

Landmark Arts Centre
- The Landmark Arts Centre
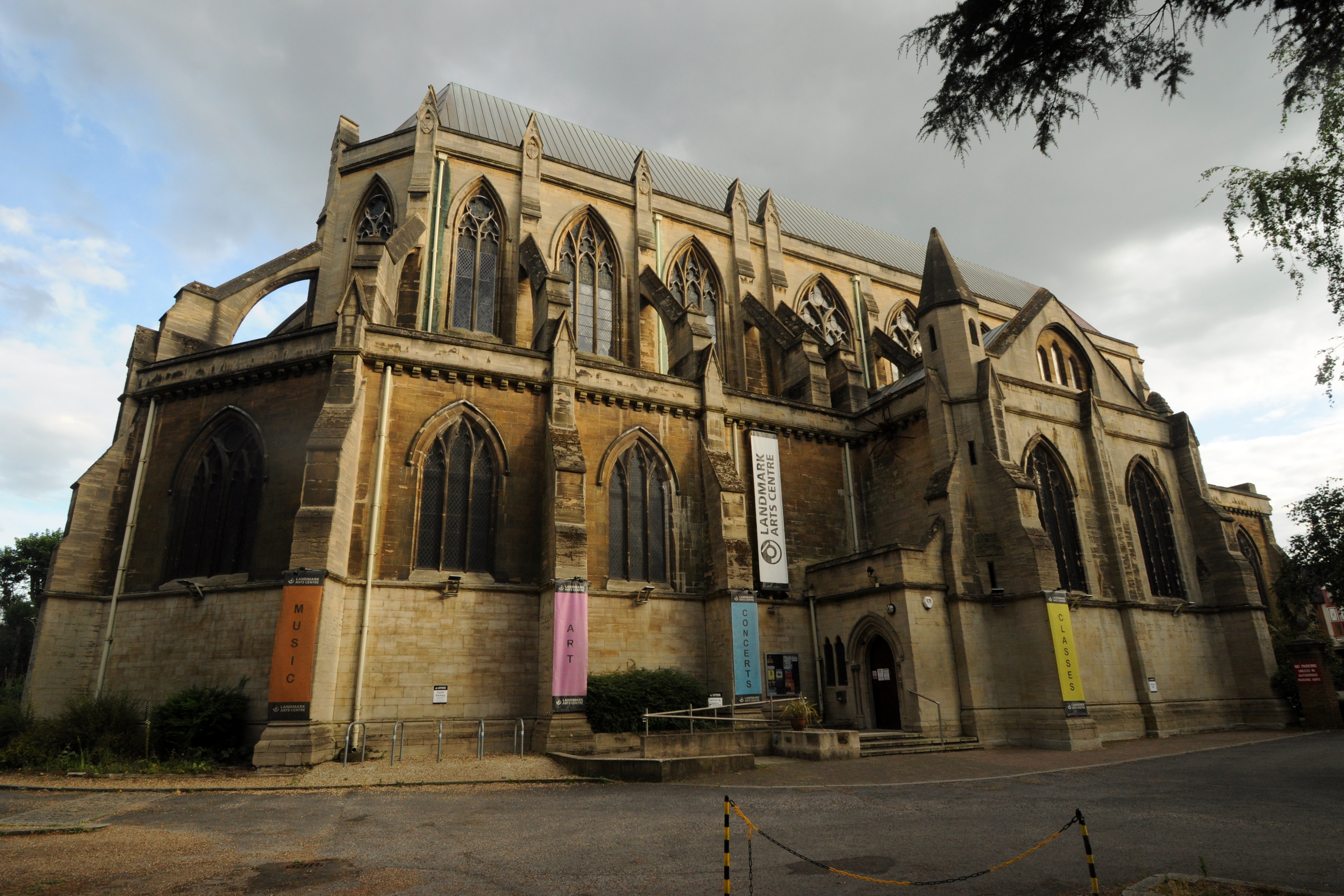
- Landmark Arts Centre
- 51.4281°N 0.3245°W
- OS grid reference: TQ 16586 71236
- Location: Ferry Road, Teddington, London Borough of Richmond upon Thames TW11 9NN
- Country: England
- Denomination: Church of England

History
- Founded: 1889
- Dedicated: 1896

Architecture
- Functional status: deconsecrated
- Architect: William S Niven
- Architectural type: French Gothic

Listed Building – Grade II*
- Official name: Church of St Alban
- Designated: 25 May 2015
- Reference no.: 1080819

Landmark Arts Centre
- Legal status: registered charity (registered in England and Wales; number 1047080)
- Purpose: "To preserve, maintain and improve the Church building formerly known as St Alban the Martyr, Teddington, for the benefit of the public and to advance the education of the public in the arts and crafts"
- Headquarters: London, England
- Location: Ferry Road, Teddington TW11 9NN
- Region served: Teddington and the London Borough of Richmond upon Thames
- Chair: Martin Nicholds
- Staff: 6
- Website: www.landmarkartscentre.org

The Landmark Arts Centre (formerly St Alban's Church) is a former church located in Teddington, in the London Borough of Richmond upon Thames, England. It was dedicated to Saint Alban, the first English Christian martyr. The building, which is Grade II* listed, is still owned by the Church of England but is now leased to the Landmark Arts Centre for use as a venue for concerts and exhibitions.

== History ==
In 1683, Charles Duncombe acquired a property opposite the parish church of St Mary's Teddington from The Marquis of Winchester, and named it Teddington Place.

The church was built directly opposite St Mary's Church, on part of the grounds of Teddington Place. The house, renamed Udney Hall, was torn down in 1946. The site is now the location of Udney Hall Gardens.

The foundation stone of the new church was laid in 1887. The design of the new church, which was built in 1889 and consecrated in 1896, was commissioned by its first vicar, Rev. Francis Leith Boyd, who had been appointed as Vicar of Teddington in 1884 when he was aged 28, officiating at the parish church of St Mary.

The congregation had attempted to build a massive church, based on the Notre-Dame de Paris and, though never designated as a cathedral, St Alban's was known informally as "the Cathedral of the Thames Valley". Funds ran short, and a planned 200 feet (61 m) tower was never built. A wall, intended to be temporary, was placed at the west end; also, the nave is shorter than in the original design.

In 1967, the church congregation reverted across the road to the historic but much smaller church of St Mary's. The building ceased to be used in 1977 and sat empty and vandalised for several years. In 1985, the video for the song "The Sun Always Shines on TV", by the Norwegian pop band A-ha, was filmed in the church building.

Local residents, including Jean Brown (who started the campaign and later became President of the Landmark Arts Centre, holding that post until her death in 2011) and Irene Sutton, secretary of the Friends of St Alban's, campaigned to save the deconsecrated church and to establish it as a local community and arts centre.

=== Architecture and fittings ===
The church was designed in the French Gothic style by architect William Niven (1846–1921) – Niven was born in Pershore and worked with Sir George Gilbert Scott on the restoration of the chapter house at Westminster Abbey – he lived at Udney House while working on St Alban. Niven's name is engraved on the external wall at the west end of the south aisle wall.

Most of the stonework is in Doulting limestone from near Shepton Mallet, Somerset. The finer grain material used internally in partitions is Corsham limestone from Wiltshire. The internal fittings were by A.H. Skipworth. The location of the pulpit, halfway down the nave, follows the French style. Its simple canopy was replaced in 1902 by a design in carved oak, embellished by gilded representations of three orders of angels.

The window on the eastern side of the north transept, featuring Jonah and the Whale, was designed by Charles Eamer Kempe and was modelled on a window in Christ Church, Oxford. The original stained glass windows mostly date from the 1890s, much of it vandalised, was by W.F. Dixon. The east window of St Alban and clerestory windows (St. Peter, St. Matthew, St. Mark, St. Luke, St. John, St. Paul) are by Morris (Westminster) (1953).

The window on the west wall was made in about 1850 by Ward and Hughes and had been originally installed in St Peter's Church, Islington. Rescued in 1987 by the London Stained-Glass Repository of the Worshipful Company of Glaziers and Painters of Glass, it was dismantled and re-leaded for installation here in 1992.

In 1993, the temporary wall was replaced with a permanent one as part of the adaptation of the building for its new use.

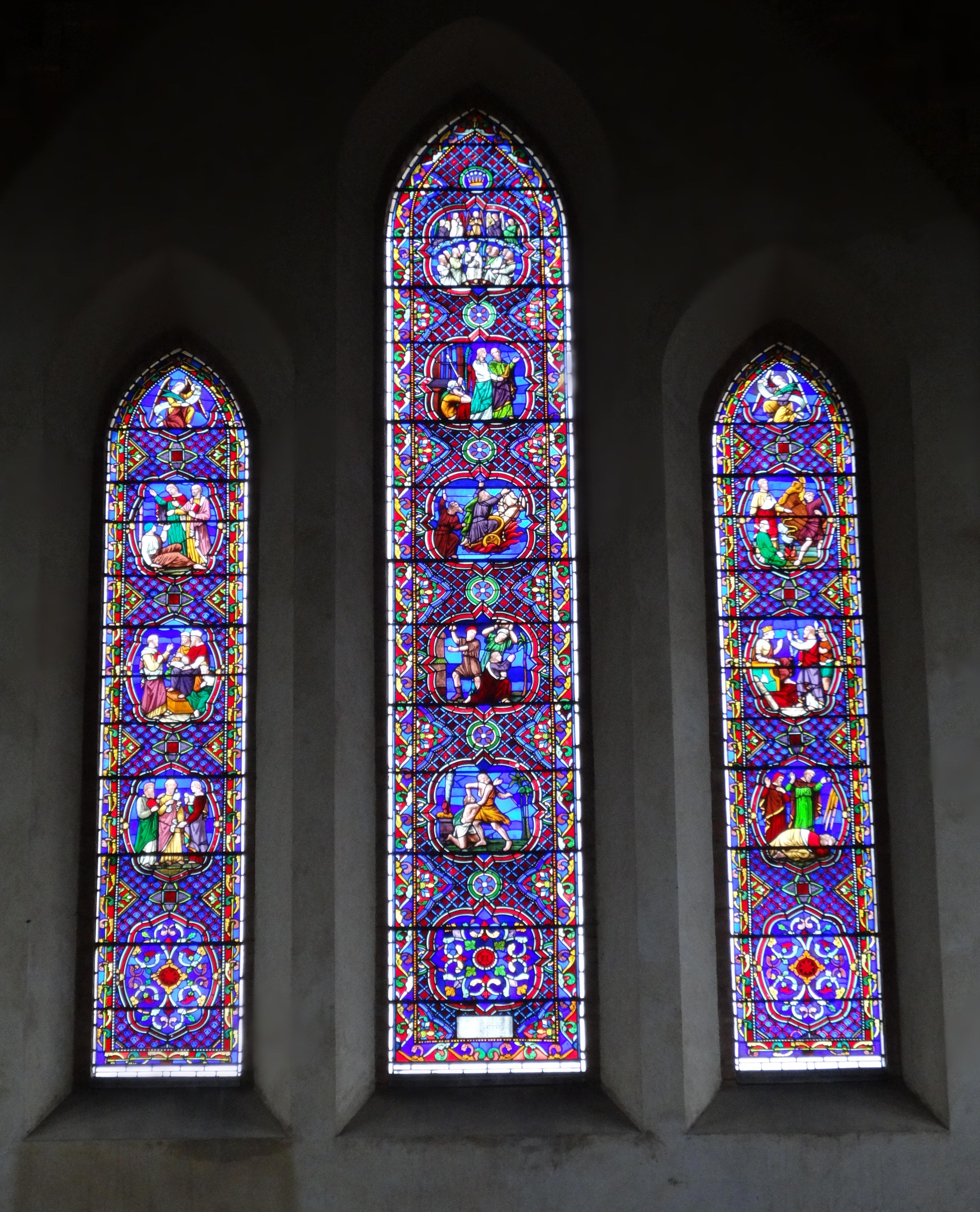
Stained glass windows inside the church

== The building today ==
The building is now operated by the Landmark Arts Centre, an independent charity, which delivers a wide-ranging arts and education programme for the local and wider community. Its activities include arts classes, concerts and exhibitions. In addition to its classes and events, the centre is open to general visitors on weekdays from 9.30 am to 5:00 pm and a number of surviving architectural features can be seen.
