= St Mary with St Alban =

Coordinates: 51.4286°N 0.3253°W

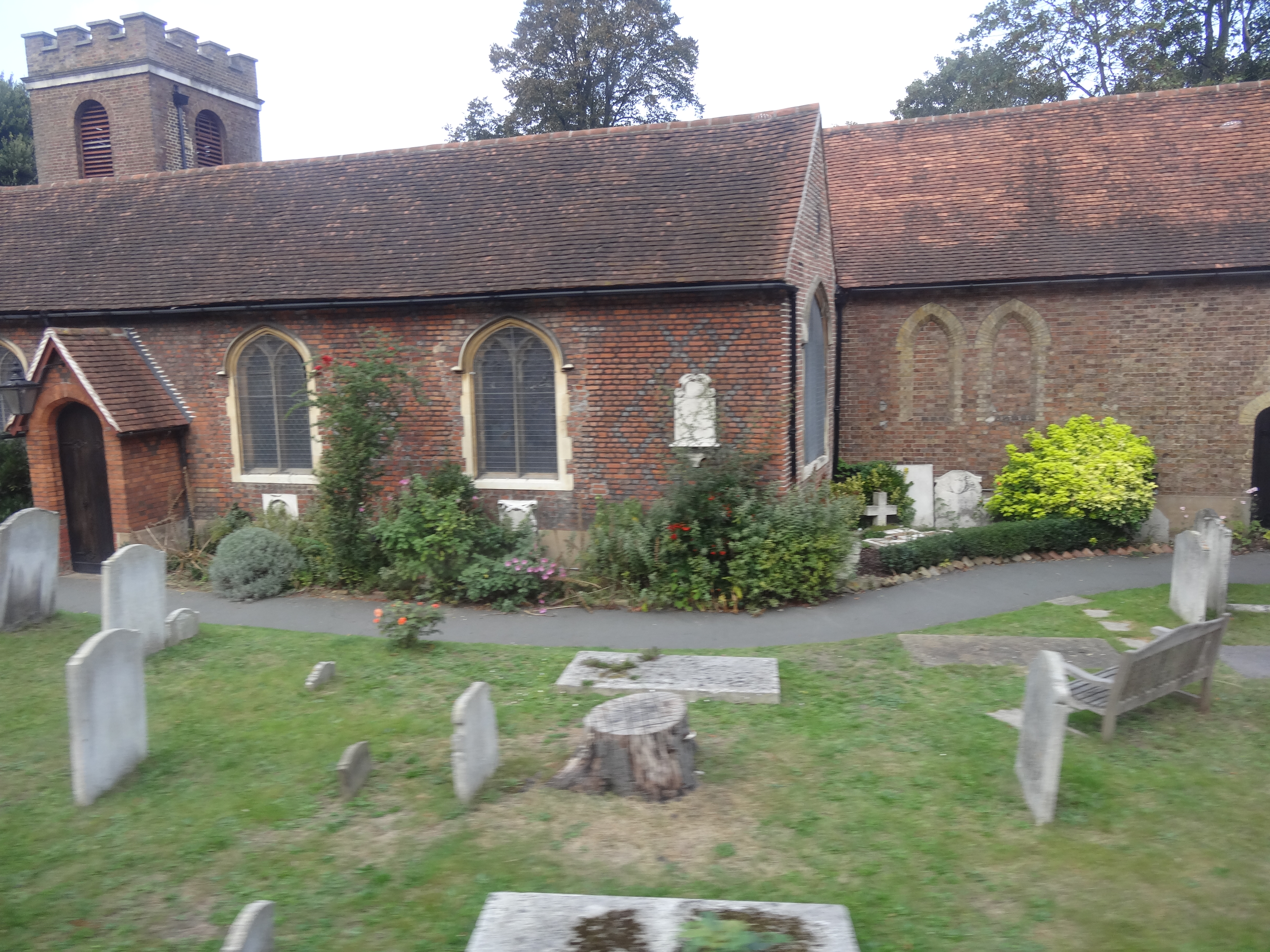
- St Mary with St Alban
- Location: Teddington, London
- Country: England
- Denomination: Church of England
- Website: teddingtonparish.org

History
- Status: Parish church

Administration
- Province: Canterbury
- Diocese: Diocese of London
- Archdeaconry: Middlesex
- Deanery: Hampton

Clergy
- Vicar: The Rev'd David Cloake

Listed Building – Grade II*
- Official name: Church of St Mary
- Designated: 2 September 1952
- Reference no.: 1253013

St Mary with St Alban is the Church of England parish church of Teddington in the London Borough of Richmond upon Thames. It comprises the church of St Mary (Teddington's old parish church) and the former church of St Alban nearby. The vicar is the Reverend David Cloake.

The church building, which has been Grade II* listed since 1952, is located on Ferry Road in Teddington, opposite the former St Alban's Church, which is now an arts centre. The oldest parts of the building date from the 16th century.

The church's most famous vicar was the Reverend Stephen Hales, a scientist whose legacy is the nearby National Physical Laboratory; he is buried next to the church's tower.

== Notable burials ==
- Sir Orlando Bridgeman, 1st Baronet (1606–1674) was an English common law jurist, lawyer, and politician who sat in the House of Commons from 1640 to 1642. He supported the Royalist cause in the Civil War.
- Rear-Admiral Valentine Collard (c. 1770–1846), served in the French Revolutionary and Napoleonic Wars.
- Henry Flitcroft (1697–1769), an architect who worked his way from a simple background to be Comptroller of the King's Works and worked on Wimpole Hall, Woburn Abbey, and St Giles in the Fields.
- Stephen Hales (1677–1761), clergyman who made major contributions to a range of scientific fields
- Thomas Traherne (1636 or 1637–1674), poet, Anglican cleric, theologian, and religious writer, who was buried under the church's reading desk
- John Walter (1738–1812), who founded The Times newspaper and died at The Grove, Teddington
- Paul Whitehead (1710–1774), poet and satirist, secretary to the infamous Hellfire Club, who lived at Colne Lodge, Twickenham.
- Margaret Peg Woffington (1720–1760), Irish actress and socialite

== Gallery ==
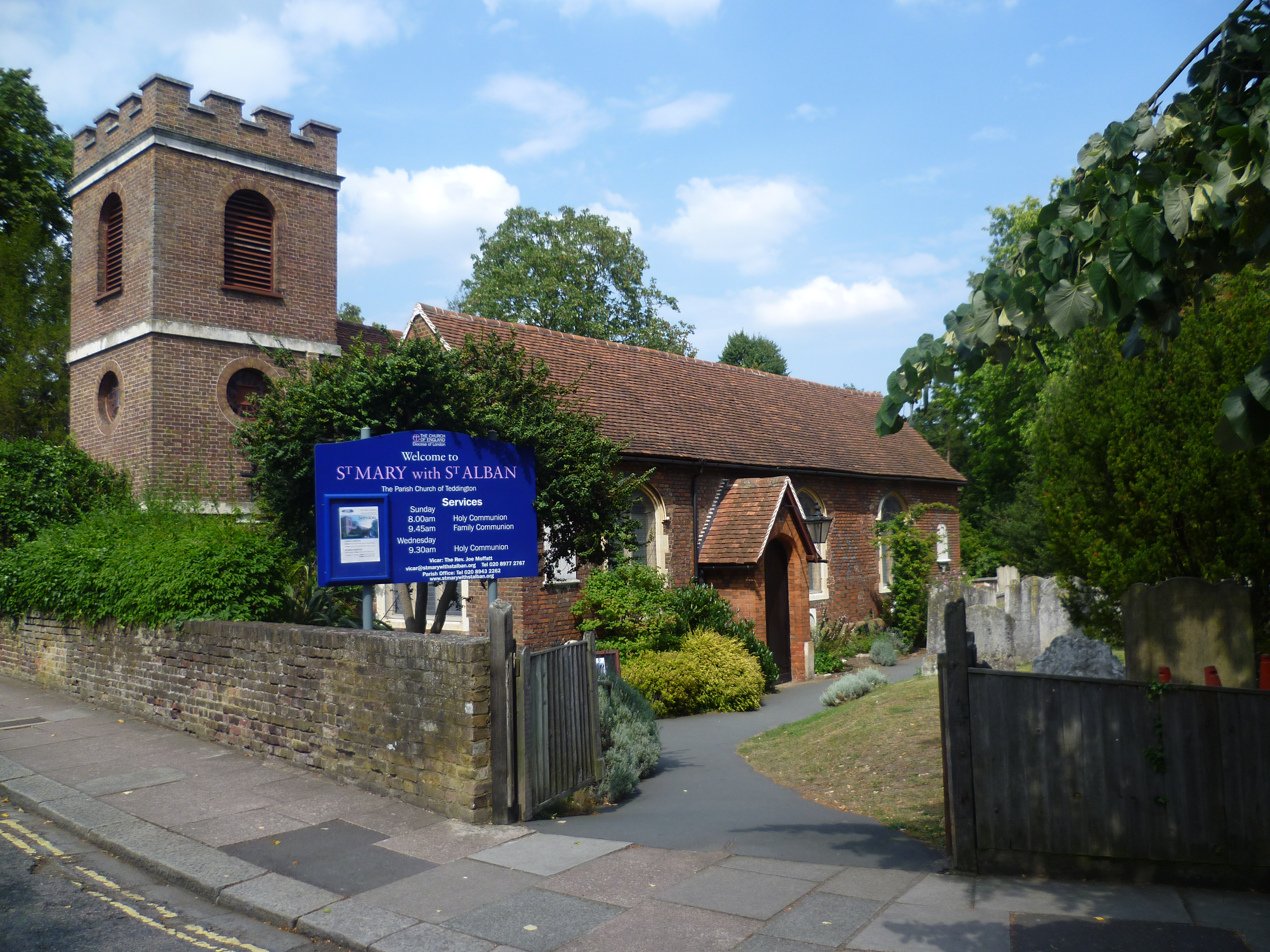
St Mary's Church

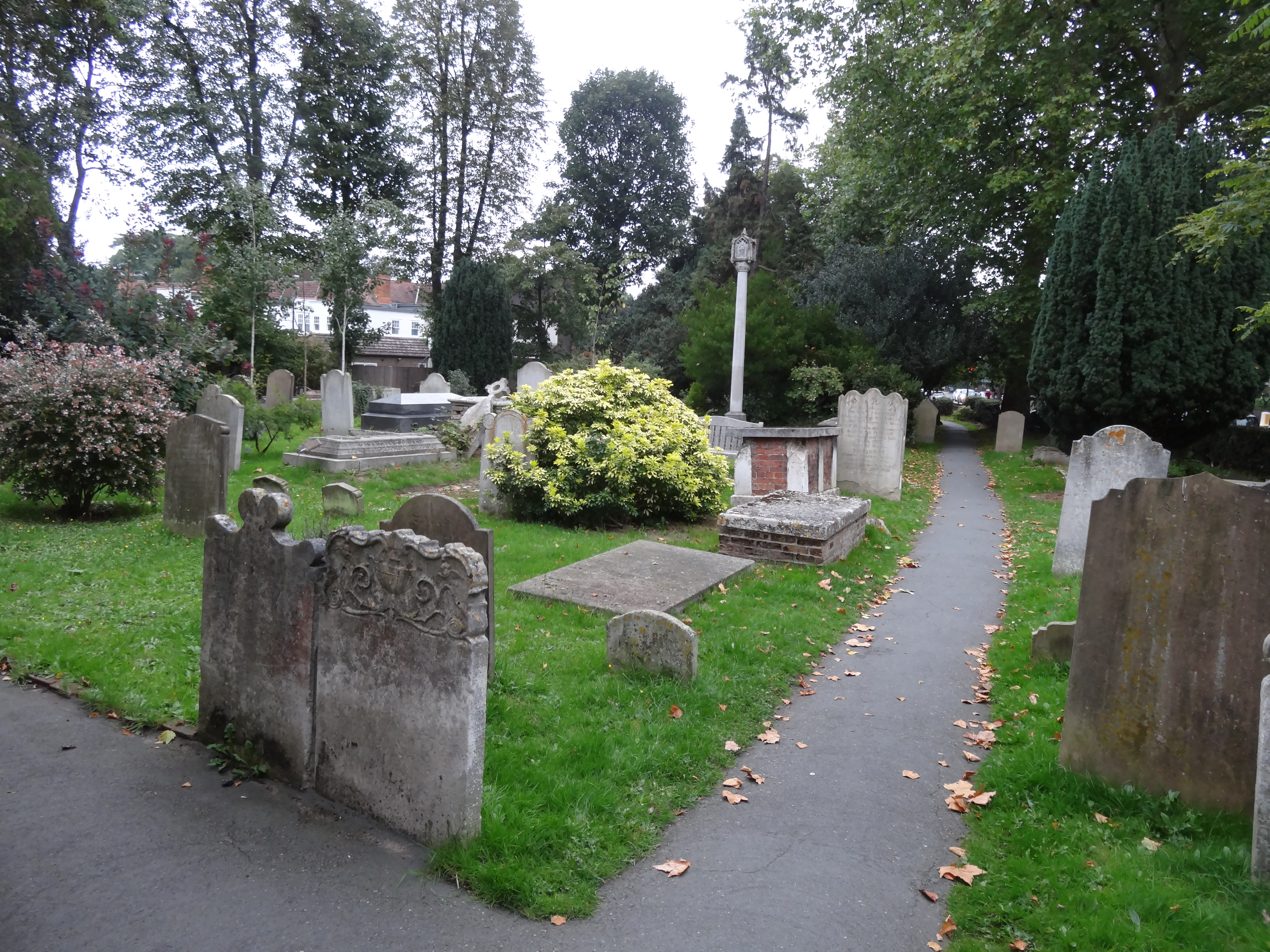
Churchyard

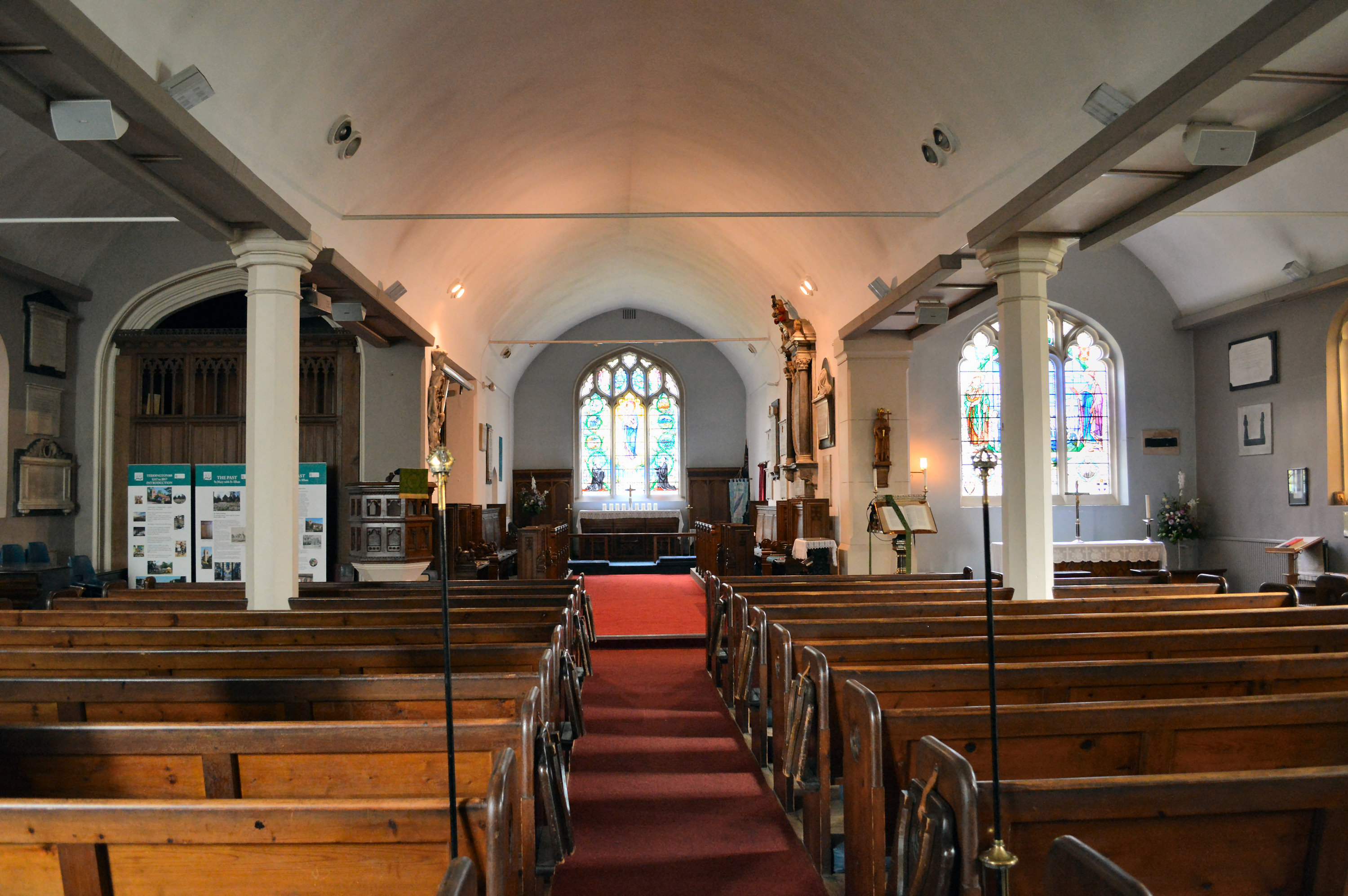
Chancel

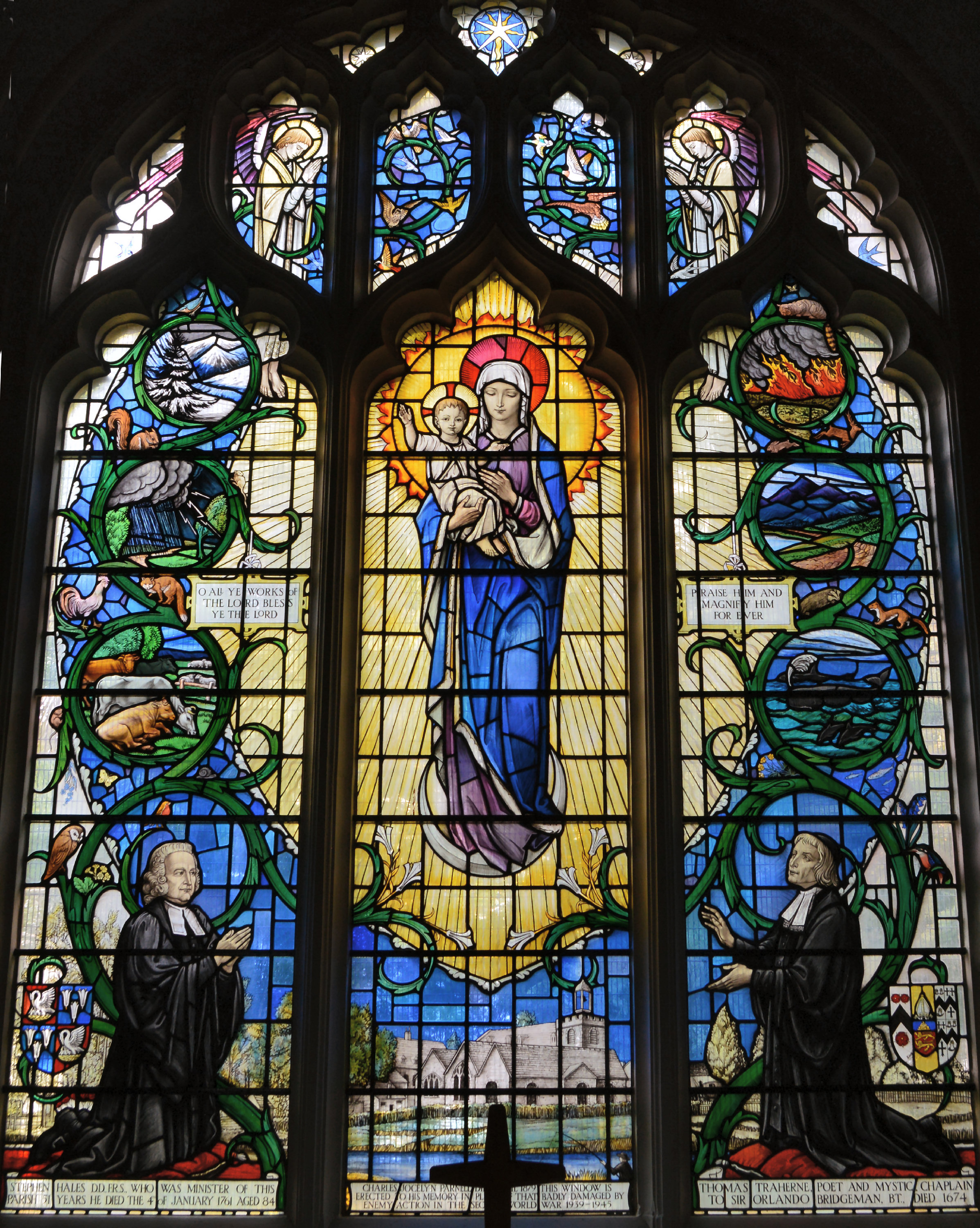
East window

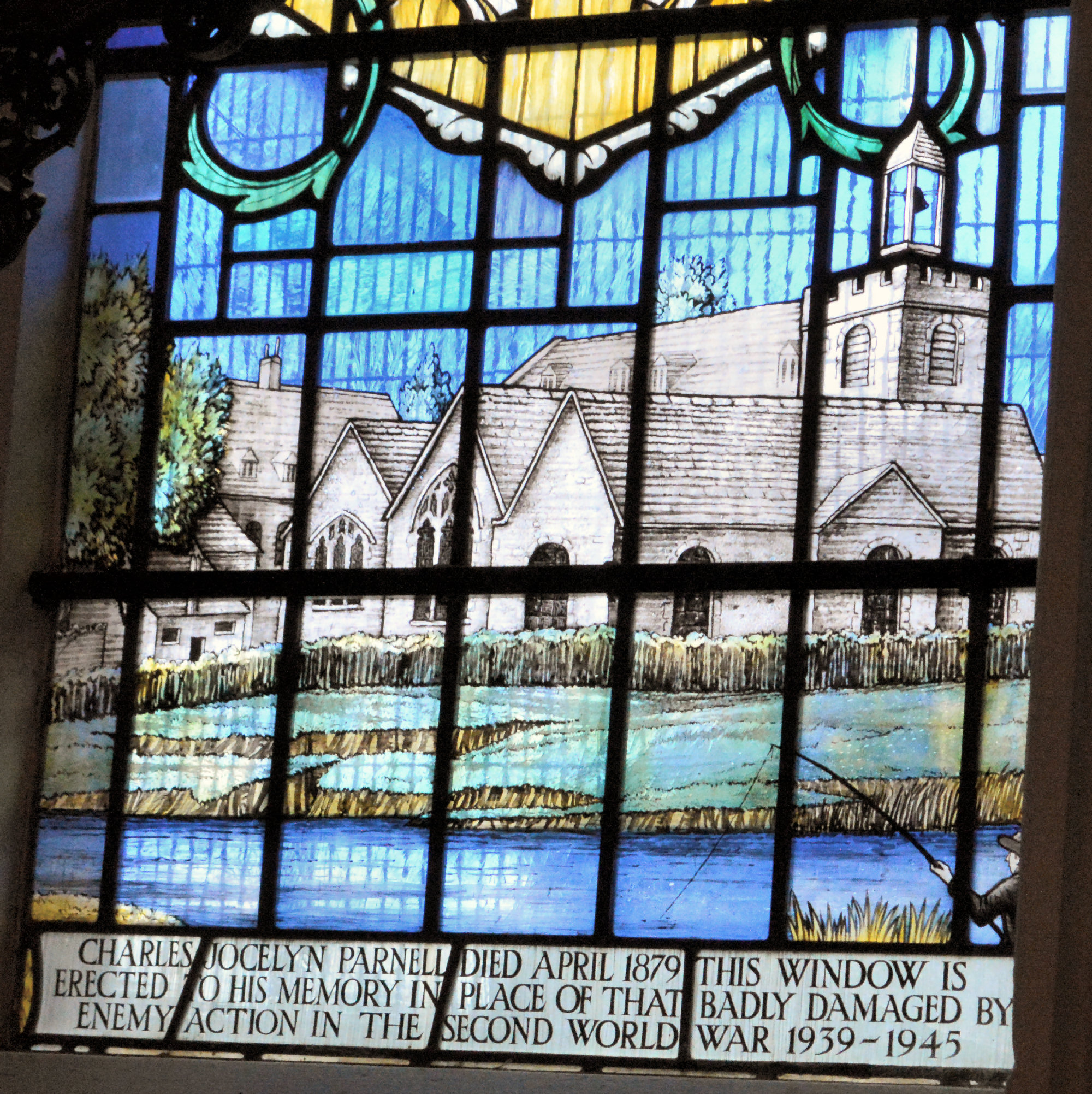
East window detail

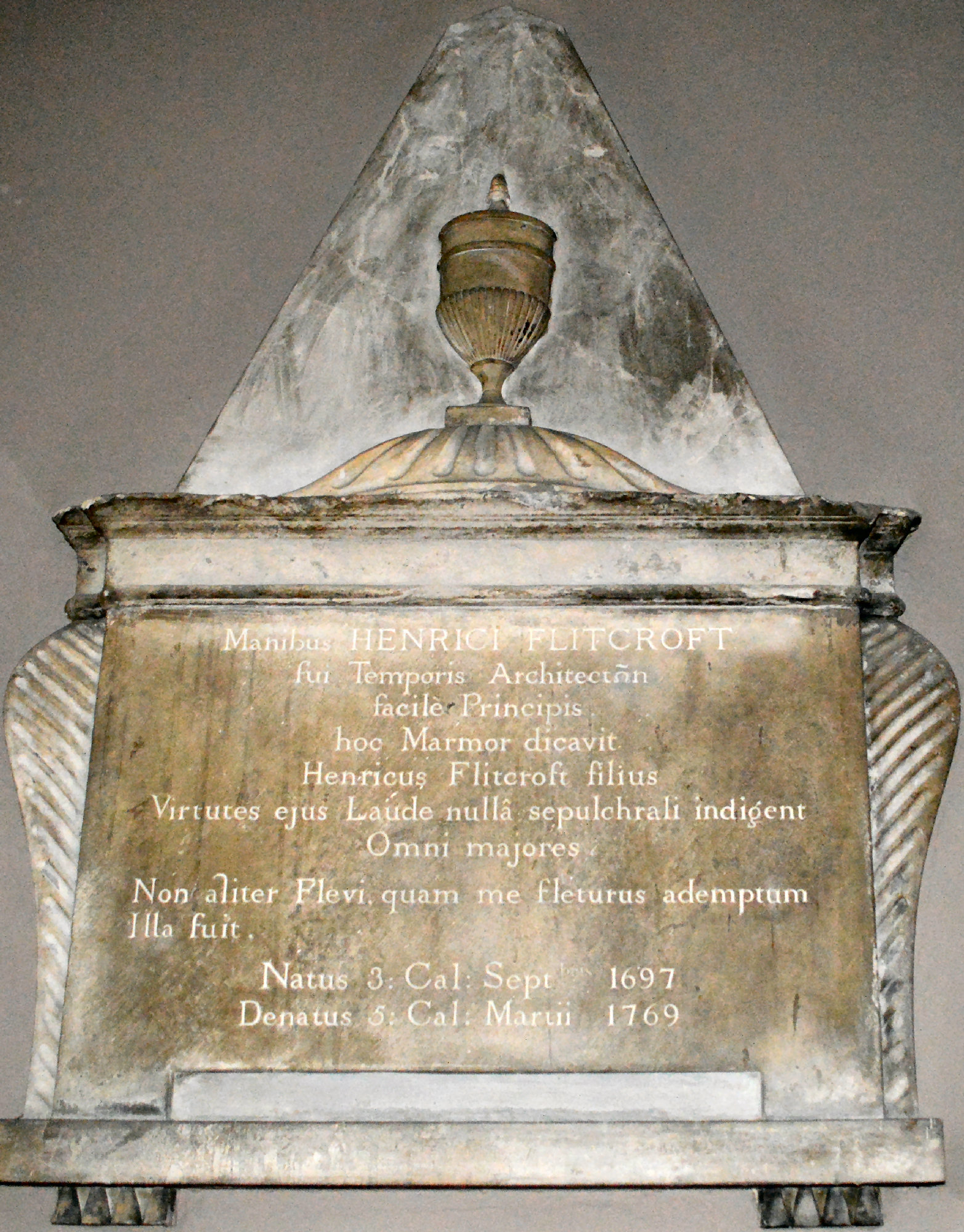
Monument for Henry Flitcroft

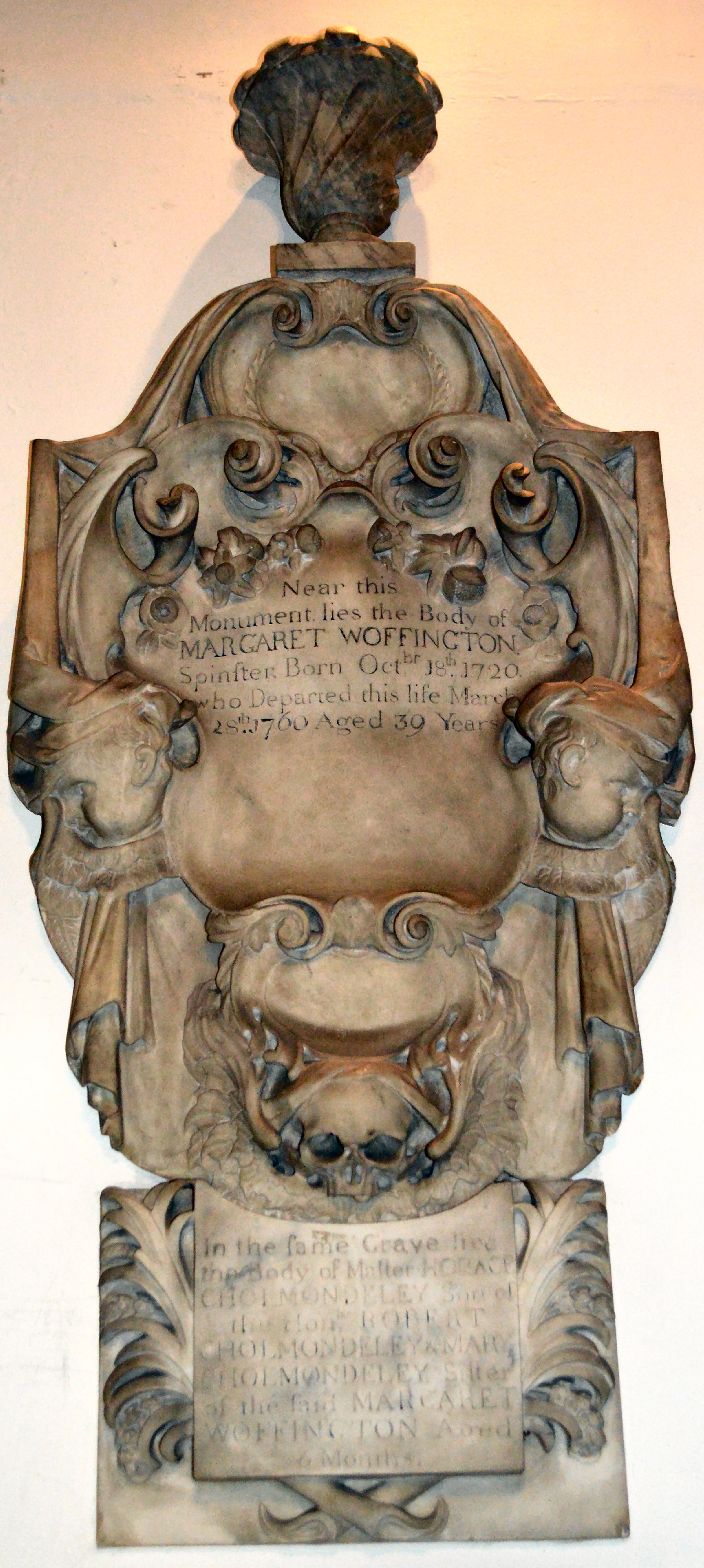
Monument for Margaret Woffington

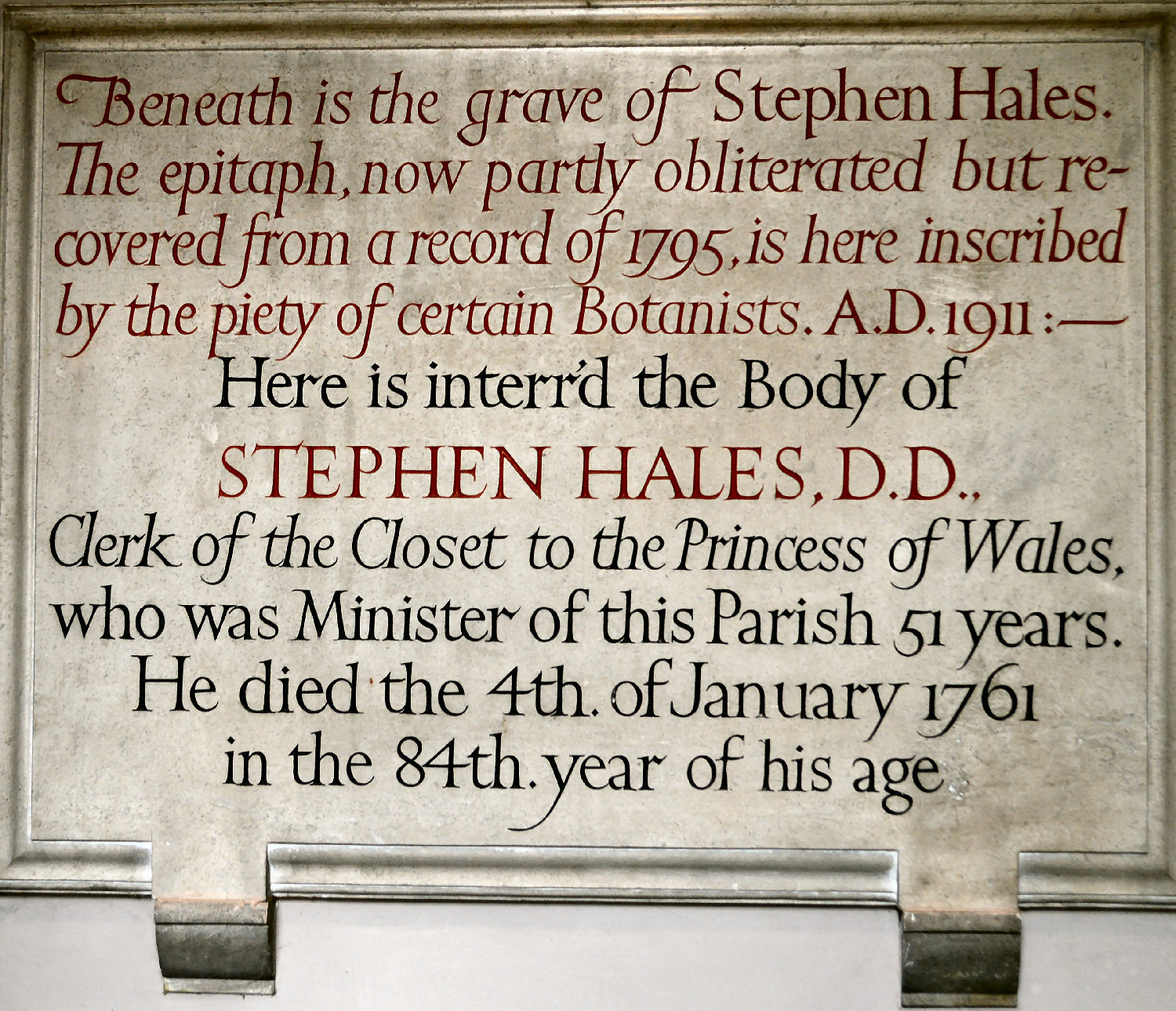
Monument for Stephen Hales
