= Chester House, Paddington =

Detached house in Tyburnia, London

Coordinates: 51°30′47″N 0°10′07″W

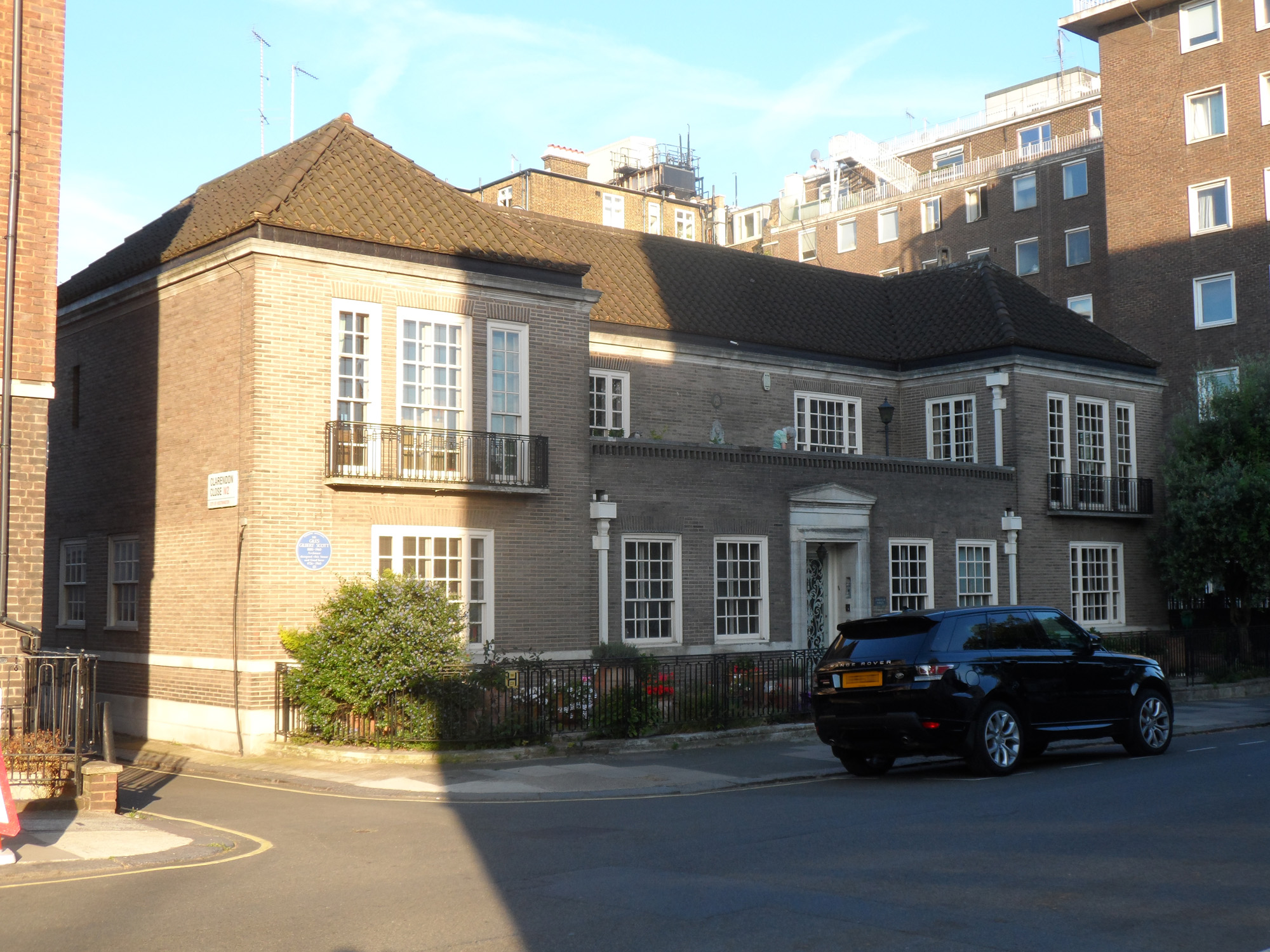
Chester House in June 2015

Chester House on Clarendon Place in Tyburnia, London, is a detached house that was designed by the architect Giles Gilbert Scott as his personal residence. Gilbert Scott lived in the house from its completion in 1926 until his death in 1960. It has been Grade II listed on the National Heritage List for England since April 1975. The Historic England heritage listing for Chester House notes the "Restrained carefully proportioned stripped Renaissance design". The house was the recipient of the annual medal for London street architecture of the Royal Institute of British Architects in 1928.

Bridget Cherry, writing in the 1991 London: North West edition of the Pevsner Architectural Guides, described Chester House as one of a "few fine individual buildings in the Classical tradition" that were built in North West London in the 1920s and 1930s, alongside Oliver Hill's 40 and 41 Chelsea Square. An English Heritage Blue Plaque was erected on the house in 1990 to mark Gilbert Scott's residency.
