= Church of Our Lady of Grace & St Edward, Chiswick =

Roman Catholic church in London, England

Coordinates: 51°29′32″N 0°15′40″W

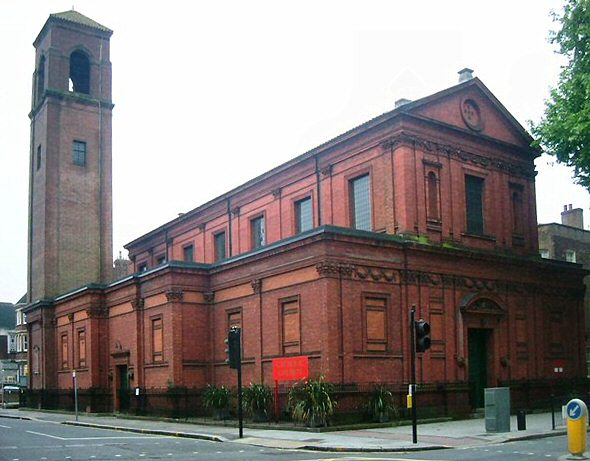
Our Lady of Grace & St Edward, 1886, tower added in 1930

The 1886 Church of Our Lady of Grace & St Edward, serving the Roman Catholic parish of Chiswick, stands on the south side of Chiswick High Road, on the corner with Duke's Avenue.

== History ==
The parish was founded in 1848. A school was started around 1855, and a church was opened by Cardinal Wiseman on the present site in 1864. It was replaced by the present building in 1886, opened by Cardinal Manning. The debts incurred were paid off and the church consecrated in 1904. The square tower was added after the First World War by Canon Egan as a war memorial. The east wall facing Duke's Avenue was damaged by a bomb in 1944; the wall and roof were restored in 1953, with the addition of a porch and baptistery by Donald Plaskett Marshall. A chapel of ease (supplementary church), St Joseph's, was based in Bolton Road, Grove Park, from 1944: the present red brick building dates from 1961. The church of Our Lady of Grace & St Edward is paired with St Joseph's and St Dunstan's, Gunnersbury.

== Architecture ==
=== Exterior ===
The Grade II listed building is a red brick basilica by the architects Kelly & Birchall, who specialised in churches in the Italianate and Gothic Revival styles. The main door, with a round pediment, faces north on to Chiswick High Road. There is no apse; the side walls are stepped. The ground floor is designed with intentionally blind window panels. The building is ornamented with substantial amounts of moulded and rubbed brick and terracotta decoration in Renaissance style. The rubbed brick pilaster capitals were carved by Joseph Cribb.

The tall rectangular yellow-brown brick bell-tower was added by Giles Gilbert Scott in 1930; a rather more ornate tower was included in the original plans. The roof is covered with pantiles.

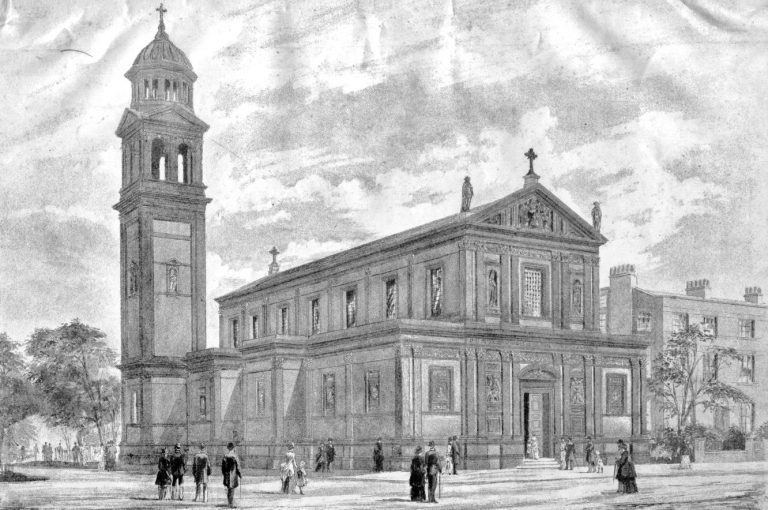
Architects' design, 1886

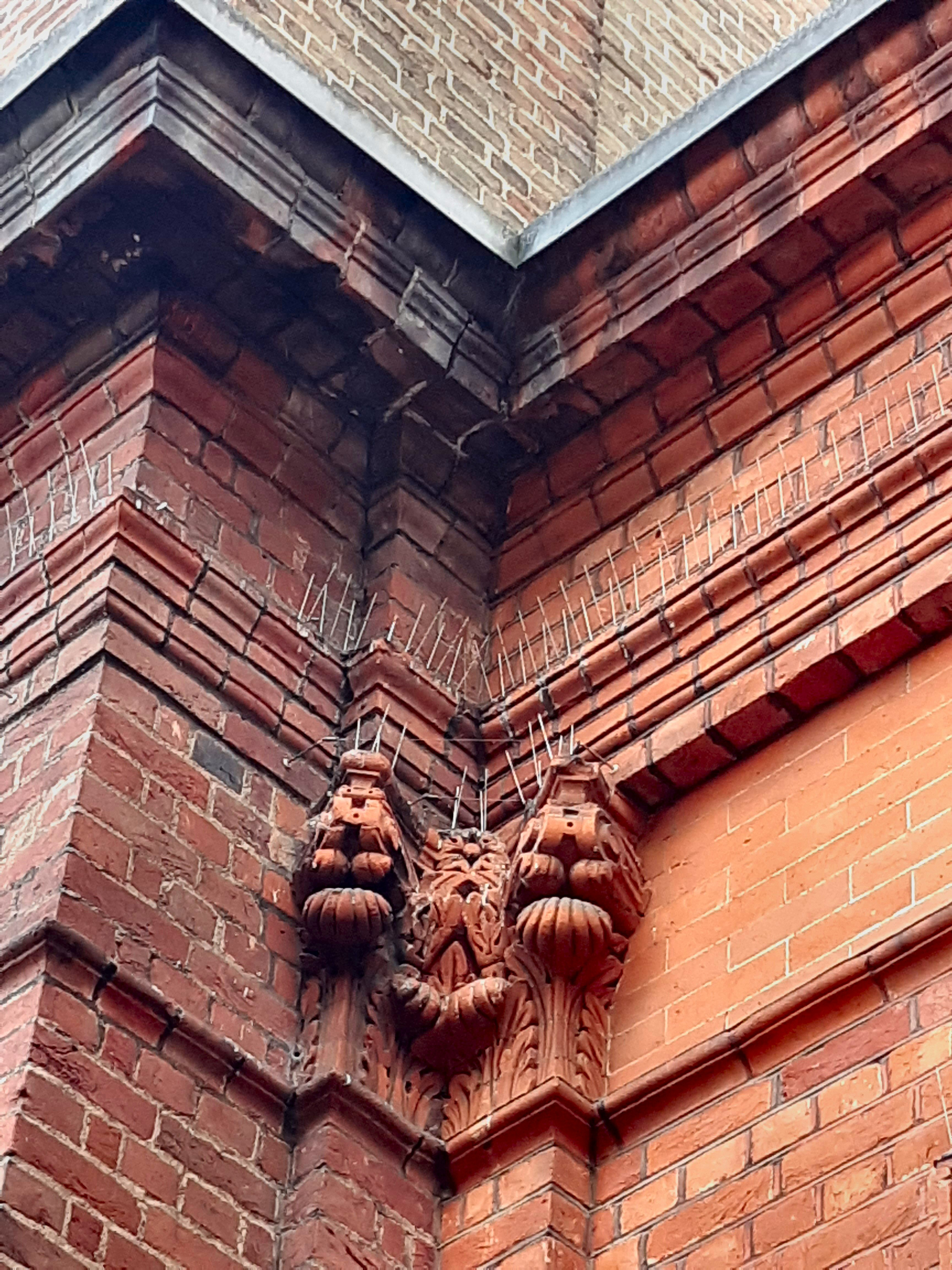
Decorative brickwork, carvings by Joseph Cribb

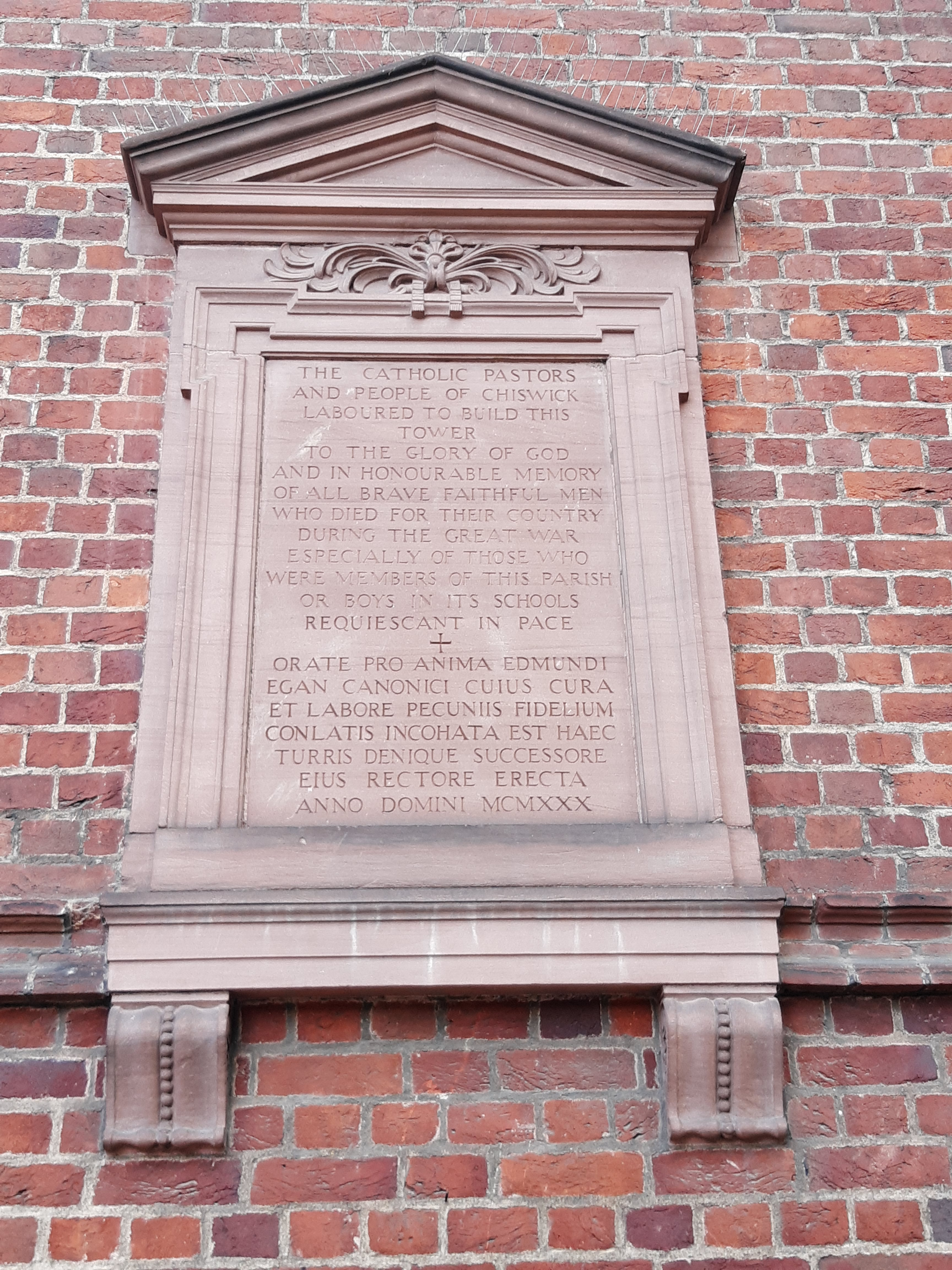
War memorial plaque erected by canon Edmund Egan, 1930

=== Interior ===
The interior is decorated with painted plaster: the walls are white, the ceiling mainly red, and ornamentation gold. The ceiling is divided into rectangular coffers with white borders. The chancel is built to the same width and height as the nave, separated by a high round arch. The nave is flanked by lower aisles, and separated from them on each side by four round Corinthian columns; the chancel has one column on each side.

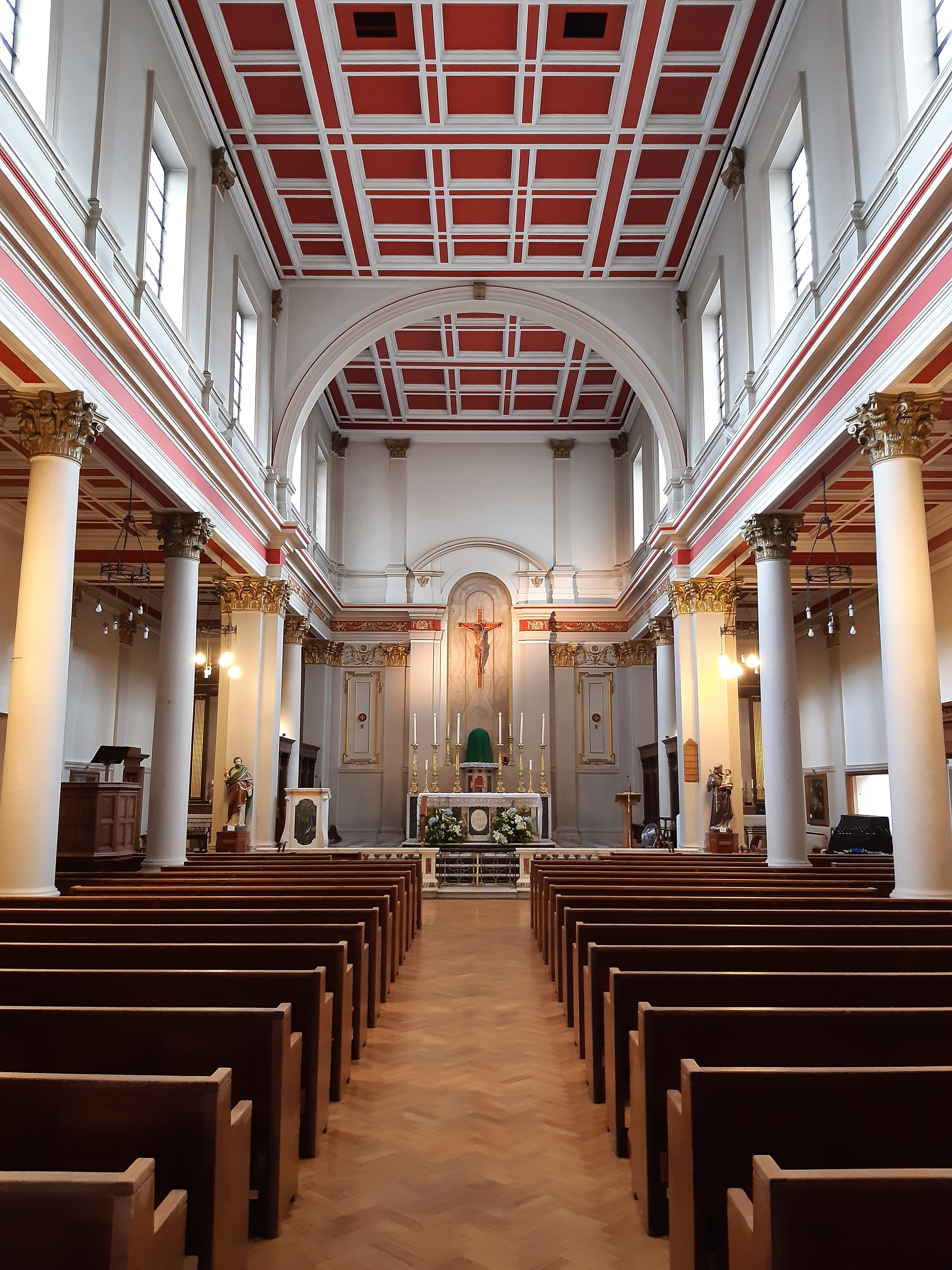
Interior, facing altar

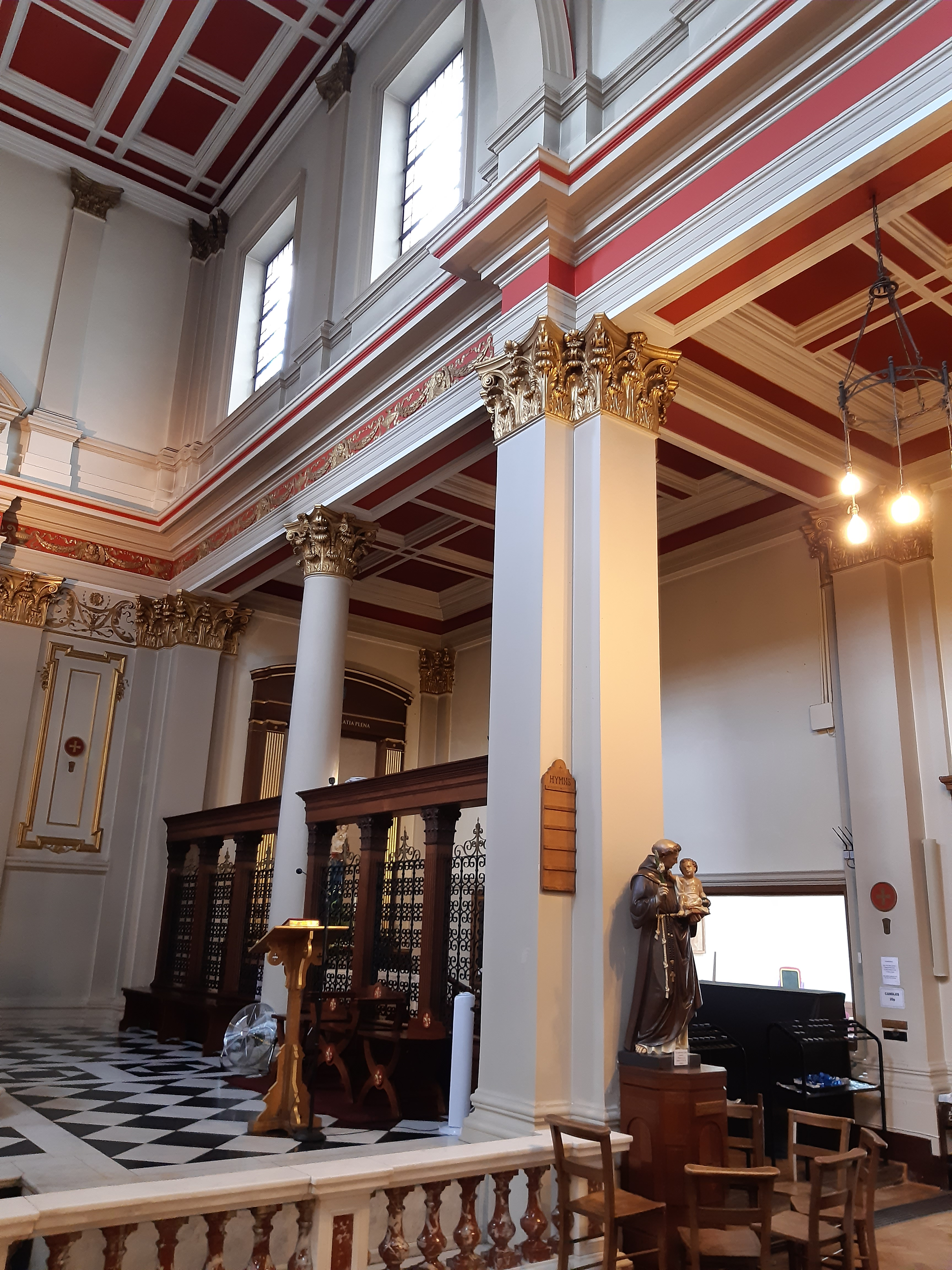
Detail of chancel

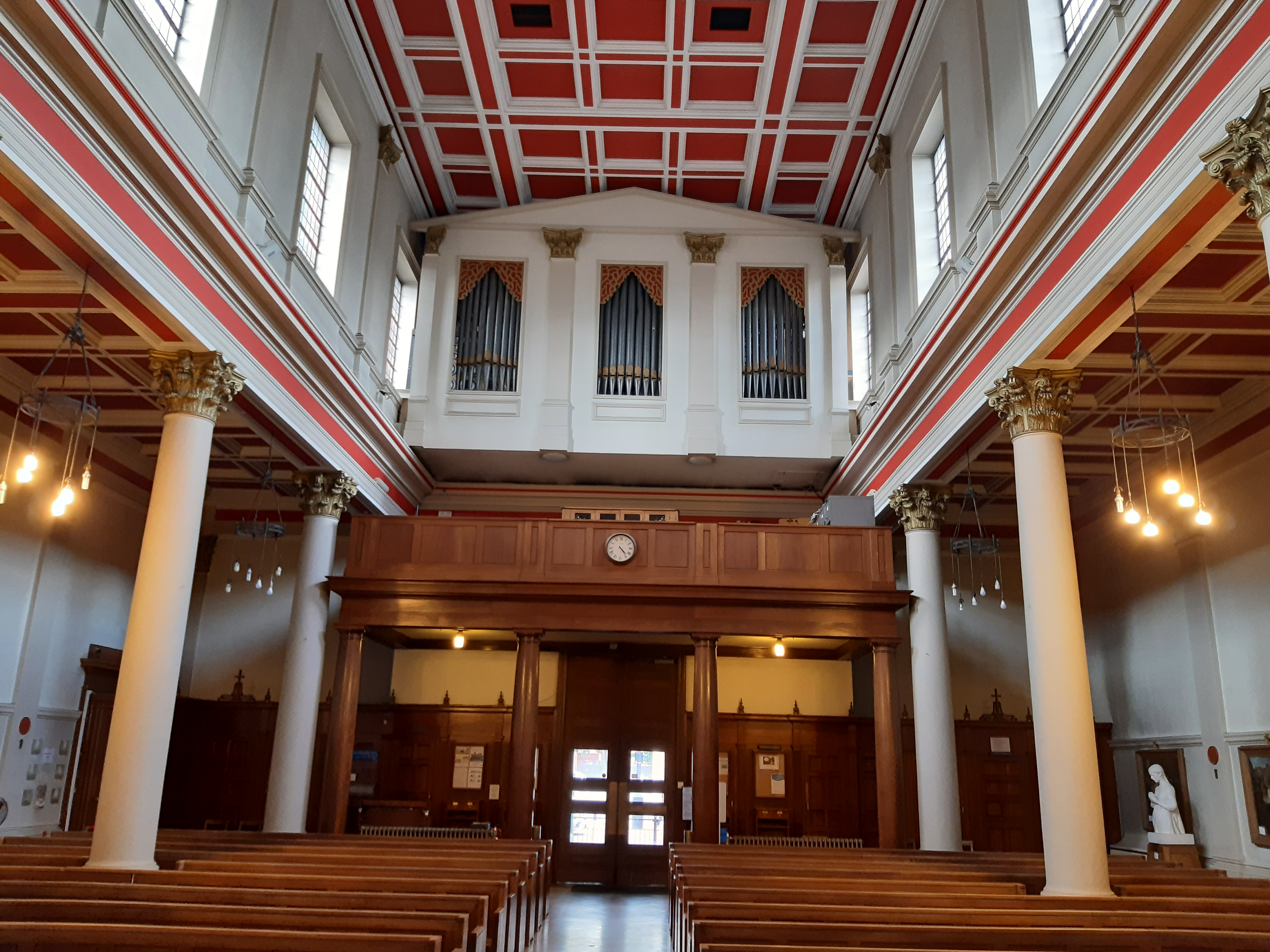
Interior, facing doors

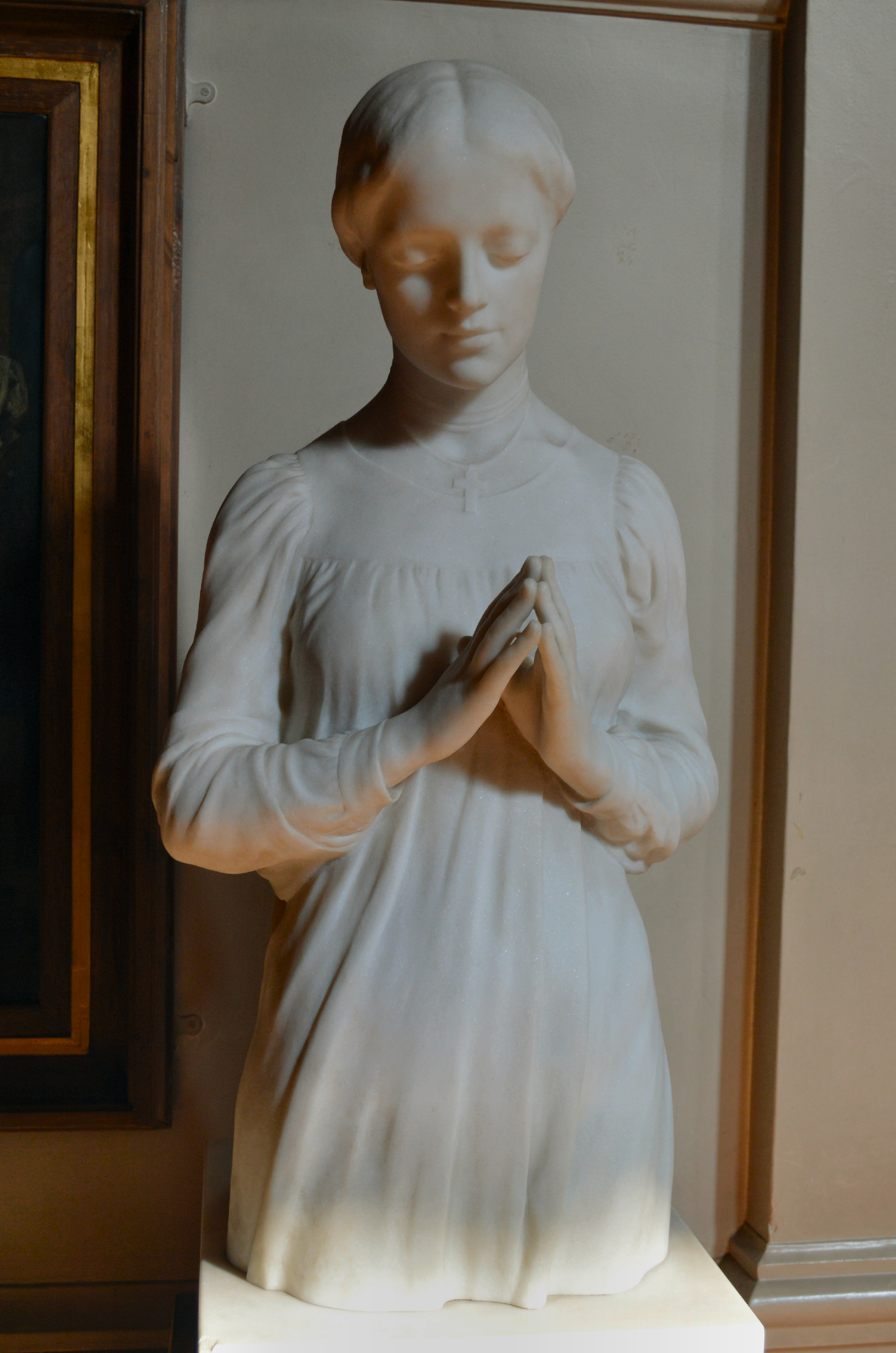
'Prayer' by T. Mewburn Crook
