= Church of Our Lady & St Alphege, Bath =

Church of Our Lady & St Alphege
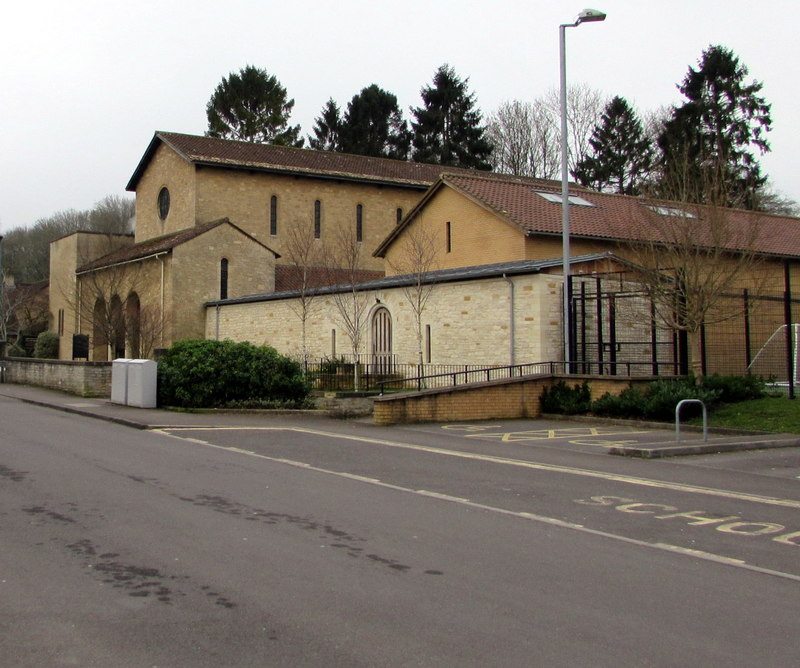
- The church in the background, with the church hall to the fore

- Location within Somerset Location within England
- 51.3734°N 2.3763°W
- OS grid reference: ST 73901 63886
- Location: City of Bath, Somerset
- Country: England
- Denomination: Roman Catholic
- Website: www.saintalphege.org.uk/index.html

History
- Consecrated: 1954

Architecture
- Heritage designation: Grade II*
- Architect: Giles Gilbert Scott
- Style: Romanesque
- Years built: 1927-29

Administration
- Province: Province of Birmingham
- Diocese: Diocese of Clifton
- Deanery: St Oliver Plunkett

Clergy
- Priest: The Reverend Malcolm Smeaton

Listed Building – Grade II*
- Official name: Church of Our Lady and St Alphege, with attached presbytery
- Designated: 4 August 1975
- Reference no.: 1396234

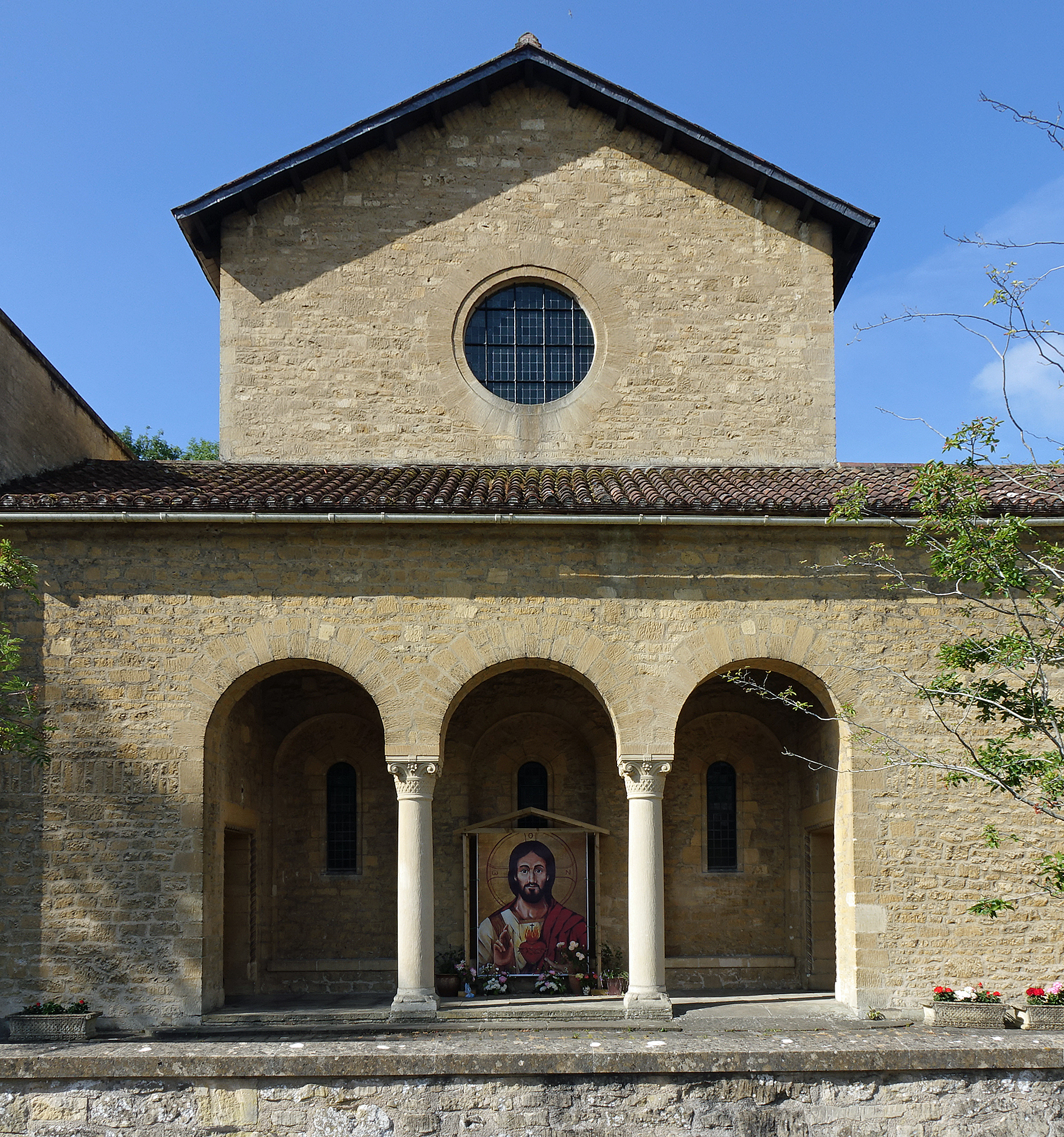
The loggia

The Church of Our Lady & St Alphege is a Roman Catholic church located in the Oldfield Park suburb of Bath, Somerset. The church was built between 1927 and 1929 to the designs of Sir Giles Gilbert Scott, the architect of Liverpool Cathedral. The church is modelled on the Early Christian basilica of Santa Maria in Cosmedin, Rome. It is a Grade II* listed building.

The exterior is Romanesque, of Bath Stone rubble. A three-arched loggia with Byzantine columns and capitals surrounds it. The red roof tiles were imported from Lombardy. The full-height campanile intended by Scott was not built, due to fears over the strength of the foundations.

The interior columns have capitals with figurative carvings by William Drinkwater Gough. Those on the columns on the north side depict scenes from the life of the Virgin Mary, those on the columns on the south, scenes from the life of St Alphege and those supporting the choir and organ loft on the west end show persons associated with the church, including Scott himself.

Scott wrote of the church, "It has always been one of my favourite works." Relatively unknown since its construction, the church was overlooked by Sir Nikolaus Pevsner in his 1958 North Somerset and Bristol edition of The Buildings of England. Its importance as an "accomplished composition by (a) nationally-renowned architect" was recognised in 2010 when its listed building status was upgraded to Grade II*. Michael Forsyth in the Pevsner Architectural Guide to Bath describes it as a building that "cannot fail to astonish and delight."
