= Giles Gilbert Scott =

English architect (1880–1960)

Sir Giles Gilbert Scott OM RA FRIBA
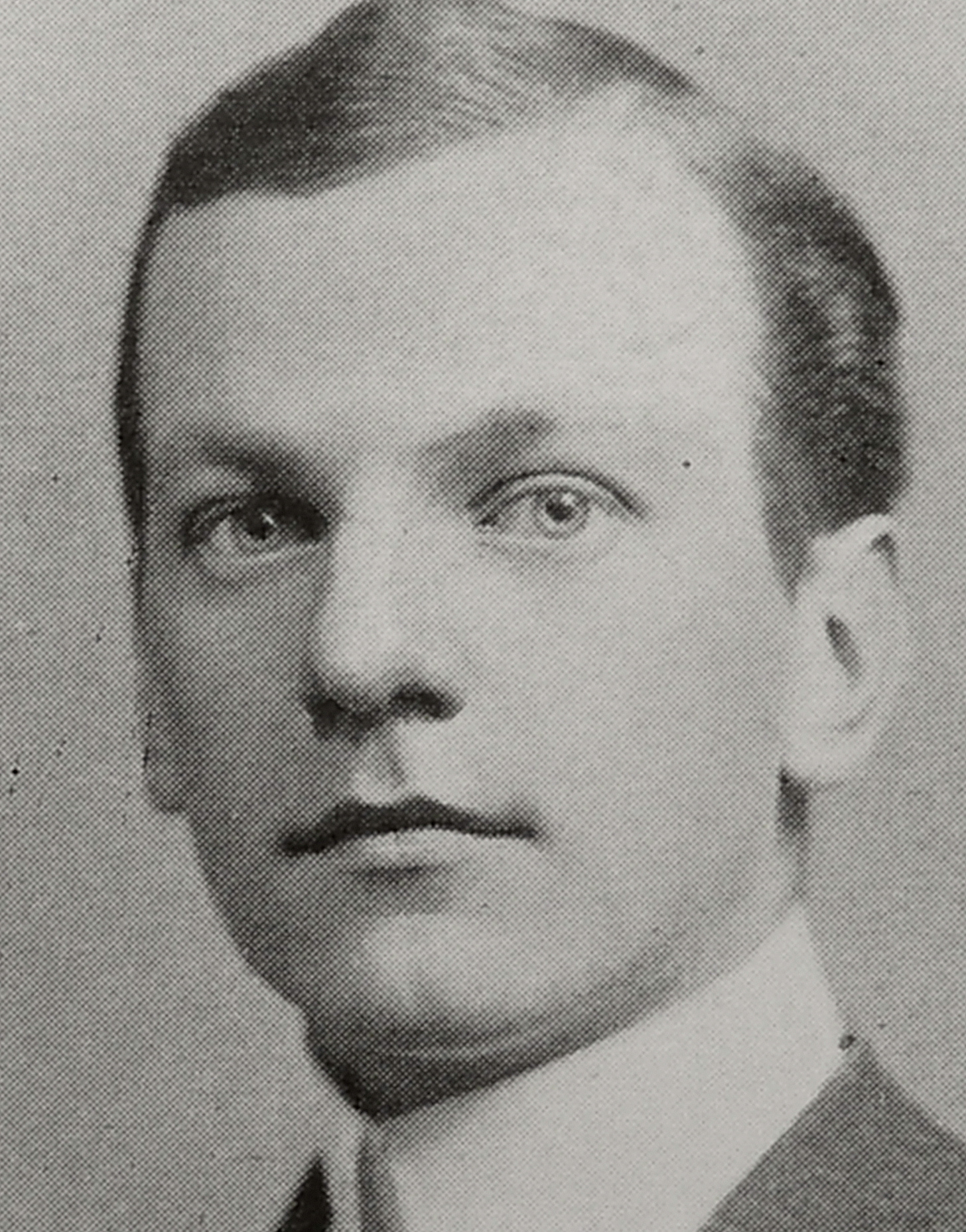
- Scott, by Elliott & Fry, 1905
- Born: 9 November 1880; Hampstead, Middlesex, England
- Died: 8 February 1960 (aged 79); Bloomsbury, London, England
- Occupation: Architect
- Buildings: New Bodleian Library; Cambridge University Library; Bankside Power Station; Liverpool Cathedral; House of Commons; Lady Margaret Hall Chapel

Sir Giles Gilbert Scott (9 November 1880 – 8 February 1960) was a British architect known for his work on the New Bodleian Library, Cambridge University Library, Lady Margaret Hall, Oxford, Battersea Power Station, The Chapel at Charterhouse, Liverpool Cathedral, and designing the iconic red telephone box.

Scott came from a family of architects. His father George Gilbert Scott Jr. was a co-founder of Watts & Co., which Scott became the second chairman of. He was noted for his blending of Gothic tradition with modernism, making what might otherwise have been functionally designed buildings into popular landmarks.

== Life and career ==
=== Early years ===
Born in Hampstead, London, Scott was one of six children and the third son of George Gilbert Scott Jr. and his wife, Ellen King Samson. His father was an architect who had co-founded the architecture and interior design company Watts & Co. in 1874. His paternal grandfather was Sir (George) Gilbert Scott, a more famous architect, known for designing the Albert Memorial and the Midland Grand Hotel at St Pancras Station.

When Scott was three, his father was declared to be of unsound mind and was temporarily confined to the Bethlem Royal Hospital. Consequently, his sons saw little of him. Giles later said that he remembered seeing his father only twice. A bequest from an uncle in 1889 gave the young Scott ownership of Hollis Street Farm, near Ninfield, Sussex, with a life tenancy to his mother. During the week Ellen Scott and her three sons lived in a flat in Battersea, spending weekends and holidays at the farm. She regularly took them on cycling trips to sketch buildings in the area, and encouraged them to take an interest in architecture. Among the buildings the young Scott drew were Battle Abbey, Brede Place and Etchingham Church; Scott's son, Richard Gilbert Scott, suggests that the last, with its solid central tower, "was perhaps the germ of Liverpool Cathedral".

Scott and his brothers were brought up as Roman Catholics; their father was a Catholic convert. Giles attended Beaumont College on the recommendation of his father who admired the buildings of its preparatory school, the work of J. F. Bentley. In January 1899 Scott became an articled pupil in the office of Temple Moore, who had studied with Scott's father. (Note: Scott's younger brother Adrian became a pupil of Moore at the same time. Their elder brother Sebastian chose a medical career, and became, in Richard Gilbert's Scott's phrase, an eminent radiologist, head of the radiology department of the London Hospital from 1909 to 1930.) From Moore, or Ellen Scott, or from his father's former assistant P. B. Freeman, Scott got to know the work of his father. In a 2005 study of Scott's work, John Thomas observes that Scott senior's "important church of St Agnes, Kennington (1874–77; 1880s–93) clearly influenced Giles's early work, including Liverpool Cathedral Lady Chapel."

In later years Scott remarked to John Betjeman, "I always think that my father was a genius. … He was a far better architect than my grandfather and yet look at the reputations of the two men!" (Note: Some of Scott's contemporaries shared his view of the relative merits of his father and grandfather. In 1950 a profile of Scott in The Observer called George Gilbert Scott, Jr. a much better architect than his more famous father. In 1960 The Guardian called the eldest Scott "the archaeological 'renovator' to whose devastating energy so many of our cathedrals bear unhappy witness, while [George Gilbert Scott Jr.] was an architect of some discrimination and taste".) Scott's father and his grandfather had been exponents of High Victorian Gothic; Scott, when still a young man, saw the possibility of designing in Gothic without the profusion of detail that marked their work. He had an unusually free hand in working out his ideas, as Moore generally worked at home, leaving Freeman to run the office.

=== Liverpool Cathedral ===
In 1901, while Scott was still a pupil in Moore's practice, the diocese of Liverpool announced a competition to select the architect of a new cathedral. Two well-known architects were appointed as assessors for an open competition for architects wishing to be considered. G. F. Bodley was a leading exponent of the Gothic revival style, and a former pupil and relative by marriage of Scott's grandfather. R. Norman Shaw was an eclectic architect, having begun in the Gothic style, and later favouring what his biographer Andrew Saint calls "full-blooded classical or imperial architecture". Architects were invited by public advertisement to submit portfolios of their work for consideration by Bodley and Shaw. From these, the two assessors selected a first shortlist of architects to be invited to prepare drawings for the new building.

For architects, the competition was an important event; not only was it for one of the largest building projects of its time, but it was only the third opportunity to build an Anglican cathedral in England since the Reformation in the 16th century (St Paul's Cathedral being the first, rebuilt from scratch after the Great Fire of London in 1666, and Truro Cathedral being the second, begun in the 19th century). The competition attracted 103 entries, from architects including Temple Moore, Charles Rennie Mackintosh and Charles Reilly. With Moore's approval, Scott submitted his own entry, on which he worked in his spare time.

In 1903, the assessors recommended that Scott should be appointed. There was widespread comment at the nomination of a 22-year-old with no existing buildings to his credit. Scott admitted that so far his only design to be constructed had been a pipe-rack. (Note: The pipe-rack had been constructed to Scott's design by his sister.) The choice of winner was even more contentious when it emerged that Scott was a Roman Catholic, (Note: At this time it was customary for architects to undertake ecclesiastical work only for the denomination to which they belonged. When Bodley's partner Thomas Garner became a Roman Catholic in 1897, the partnership was dissolved and Garner's church work was thereafter exclusively for the Roman Catholic church while Bodley worked solely on Anglican churches.) but the assessors' recommendation was accepted by the diocesan authorities.

Because of Scott's age and inexperience, the cathedral committee appointed Bodley as joint architect to work in tandem with him. A historian of Liverpool Cathedral observes that it was generous of Bodley to enter into a working relationship with a young and untried student. Bodley had been a close friend of Scott's father, but his collaboration with the young Scott was fractious, especially after Bodley accepted commissions to design two cathedrals in the US, (Note: These were for Washington, DC, and San Francisco. The latter was not built.) necessitating frequent absences from Liverpool. Scott complained that this "has made the working partnership agreement more of a farce than ever, and to tell the truth my patience with the existing state of affairs is about exhausted". Scott was on the point of resigning when Bodley died suddenly in 1907, leaving him in charge. The cathedral committee appointed Scott sole architect, and though it reserved the right to appoint another co-architect, it never seriously considered doing so.

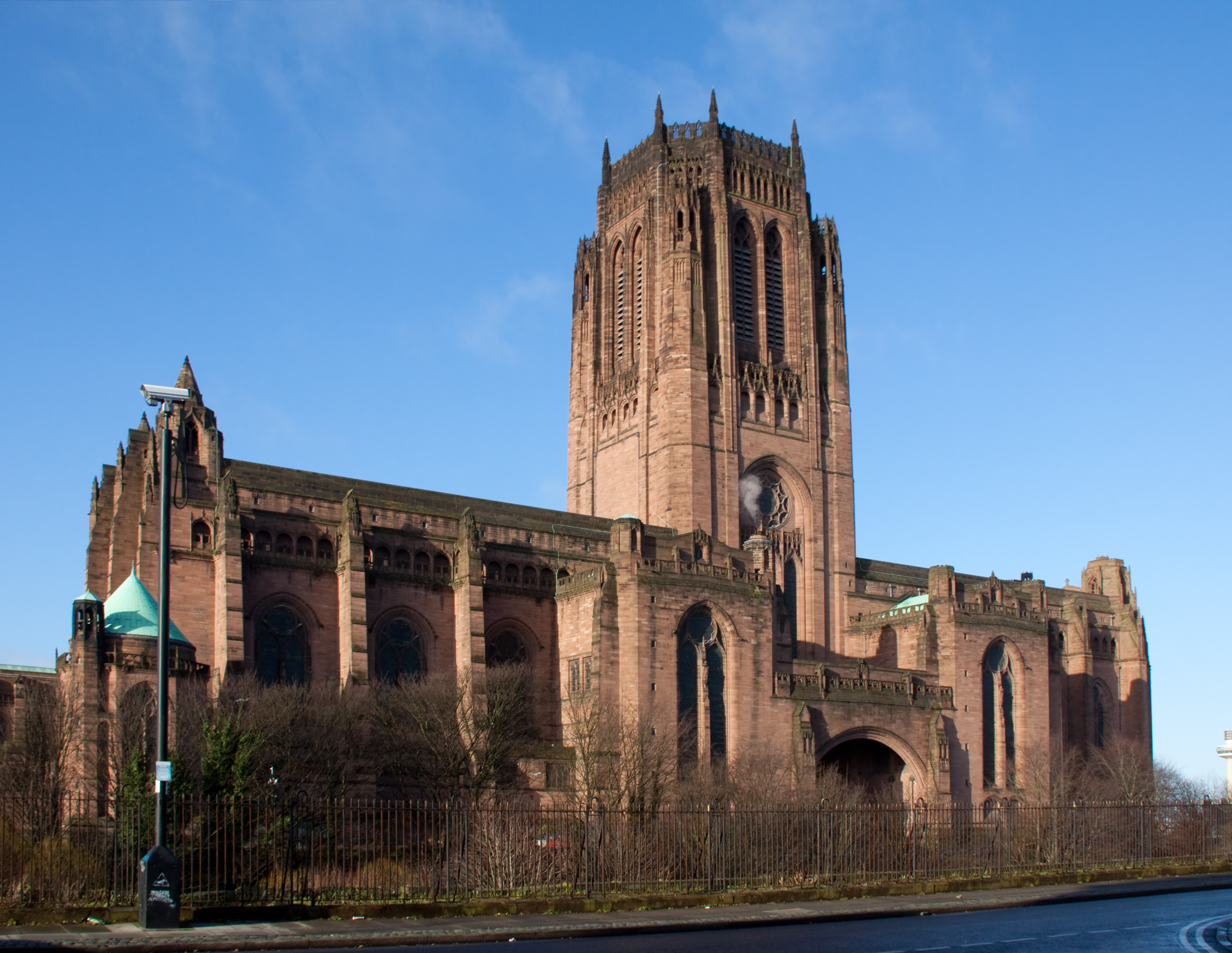
Liverpool Cathedral in 2012

In 1910 Scott realised that he was not happy with the main design, which looked like a traditional Gothic cathedral in the style of the previous century. He persuaded the cathedral committee to let him start all over again (a difficult decision, as some of the stonework had already been erected) and redesigned it as a simpler and more symmetrical building with a single massive central tower instead of the original proposal for twin towers. Scott's new plans provided more interior space. At the same time Scott modified the decorative style, losing much of the Gothic detailing and introducing a more modern, monumental style.

The Lady Chapel, the first part of the building to be completed, was consecrated in 1910 by Bishop Chavasse in the presence of two archbishops and 24 other bishops. Work was severely limited during the First World War, with a shortage of manpower, materials and money. By 1920, the workforce had been brought back up to strength and the stone quarries at Woolton, source of the red sandstone for most of the building, reopened. The first section of the main body of the cathedral was complete by 1924, and on 19 July 1924, the 20th anniversary of the laying of the foundation stone, the cathedral was consecrated in the presence of King George V and Queen Mary, and bishops and archbishops from around the globe.

Construction continued throughout the 1930s, but slowed drastically throughout the Second World War, as it had done during the First. Scott continued to work on the project until his death, refining the design as he went. He designed every aspect of the building down to the fine details. The cathedral was finished in 1978, nearly two decades after Scott's death.

=== Other early work ===
While Scott was feuding with Bodley in Liverpool, he managed to design and see built his first complete church. This was the Church of the Annunciation, a Roman Catholic church in Bournemouth, in which he made a high transept similar to his original plan for Liverpool. His work on another new Roman Catholic church at Sheringham, Norfolk showed his preference for simple Gothic frontages. Other churches built by Scott at this time, at Ramsey on the Isle of Man, Northfleet in Kent and Stoneycroft in Liverpool, show the development of his style. Scott and his brother Adrian worked on Grey Wings, a house in Ashtead, Surrey in 1913. While working in Liverpool, Scott met and married Louise Wallbank Hughes, a receptionist at the Adelphi Hotel; his mother was displeased to learn that she was a Protestant. The marriage was happy, and lasted until Louise Scott's death in 1949. They had three sons, one of whom died in infancy.

During the First World War Scott was a Major in the Royal Marines. He was in charge of building sea defences on the English Channel coast.

=== 1920s ===
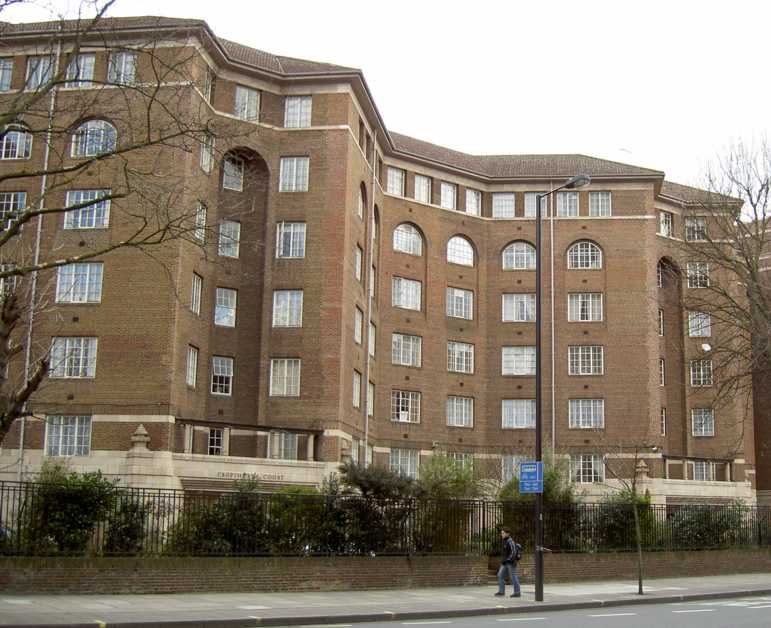
Cropthorne Court, Maida Vale (1930).

As Liverpool Cathedral rose Scott's fame grew, and he began to secure commissions for secular buildings. One of the first was for Clare College, Cambridge, Memorial Court, which was in a neo-Georgian style on the west bank of the River Cam. This style was also used for Chester House, a house he designed for himself in Clarendon Place, Paddington in 1924, which won the annual medal for London street architecture of the Royal Institute of British Architects in 1928. Scott's residential buildings are few; one of the best known is the Cropthorne Court mansion block in Maida Vale, where the frontage juts out in diagonals, eliminating the need for lightwells.

Scott also acted as a judge in architectural competitions. The Welsh National Eisteddfod prize of £100 for a design for the North Wales Heroes’ Memorial, for erection in the grounds of the University College, at a cost of £15,000, has been awarded by Sir Gilbert Scott to Mr D Wynne Thomas MSA, Old St Paul’s Vicarage, Bolton. Mr Gilbert Scott says "the design is refined, scholarly, and displays architectural sense of style superior to the forty other designs sent for open competition. Its simplicity and restraint produces a dignity in keeping with the purpose of the memorial, and the contrasts between plain surface and enrichment are effective". In the 1921 competition for the North Wales Heroes' Memorial at Bangor, Gwynedd, he assessed approximately forty entries and selected the design by Welsh architect Daniel Wynne-Thomas.

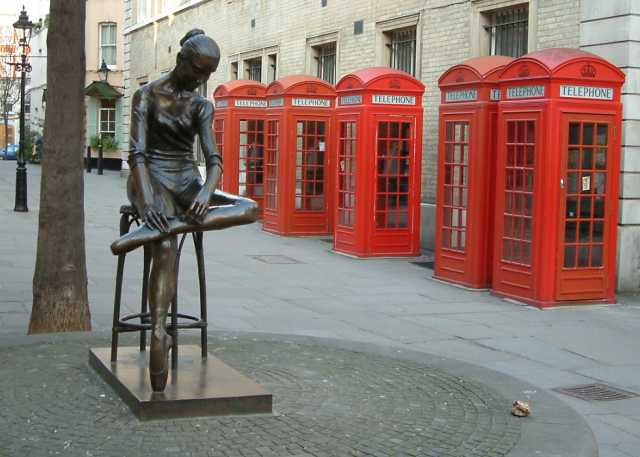
K2 red telephone boxes preserved as a tourist attraction near Covent Garden, London

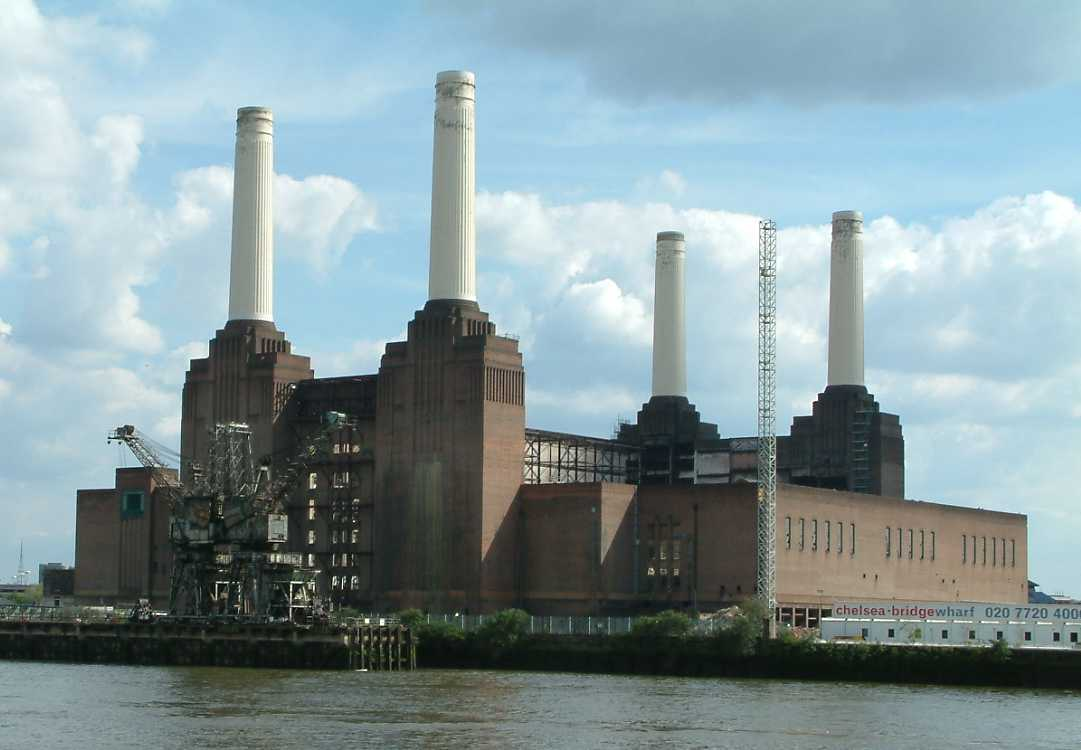
Battersea Power Station

Scott continued working on churches during the inter-war years. Shortly after his work on the nave at Downside Abbey he was commissioned to design the small Roman Catholic Church of Our Lady & St Alphege, Bath, the first part of which was completed in 1929. His design was inspired by the church of Santa Maria in Cosmedin, Rome. Scott's distillation of the main elements of that large and ancient church into the much smaller Bath parish church has been described as "a delight" which "cannot fail to astonish". Some 25 years later he wrote "The church was my first essay into the Romanesque style of architecture. It has always been one of my favourite works". On the capital of one of the pillars beneath the west gallery W. D. Gough carved a representation of the architect, and a shield inscribed "Aegidio architecto" (By Giles the architect) – possibly the only depiction of Scott in stone.

Scott's most ubiquitous design was for the General Post Office. He was one of three architects invited by the Royal Fine Arts Commission to submit designs for new telephone kiosks. (Note: The other two were Sir Robert Lorimer and Sir John Burnet.) The invitation came at the time Scott was made a trustee of Sir John Soane's Museum. His design was in the classical style, topped with a dome reminiscent of the mausoleum Soane designed for himself in St Pancras Old Church yard, London. It was the chosen design and was put into production in cast iron as the GPO's "Kiosk no. 2" or "K2". In 1932 the design was expanded to include a posting box and two stamp vending machines as "Kiosk no. 4" or "K4". Later designs adapted the same general look for mass production: the Jubilee kiosk, introduced for King George V's silver jubilee in 1935 and known as the "K6", eventually became a fixture in almost every town and village. (Note: Some rural communities were not impressed by the vivid red of Scott's design. A councillor in the Lake District said, "red might be the best colour for London, but they did not want that colour of Hades brought into the Lake District.")

=== 1930s ===
In 1930 the London Power Company engaged Scott as consulting architect for its new electricity generating station at Battersea. The building was designed by the company's chief engineer, Leonard Pearce, and Scott's role was to enhance the external appearance of the massive architecture. (Note: Scott was at pains to emphasise the limits of his contribution to the building and to ensure that due credit was given to Pearce and to the architectural practice Halliday and Agate which was responsible for the interior.) He opted for external brickwork, put some detailing on the sheer walls, and remodelled the four corner chimneys so that they resembled classical columns. Battersea Power Station, opened in 1933 but disused since 1982, remains one of the most conspicuous industrial buildings in London. At the time of its opening, The Observer, though expressing some reservations about details of Scott's work, called it "one of the finest sights in London". (Note: The paper's architecture correspondent complained that the four chimneys looked like minarets – "though very beautiful minarets".) In a poll organised by The Architectural Review in 1939 to find what lay people thought were Britain's best modern buildings, Battersea Power Station was in second place, behind the Peter Jones building.

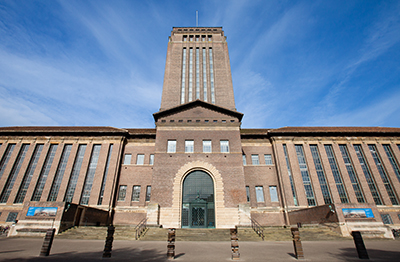
Cambridge University Library, opened in 1934

In Cambridge, next to Clare College's Memorial Court, Scott designed the enormous library for the entire University of Cambridge. He placed two six-storey courtyards in parallel with a twelve-storey tower in the centre, and linked the windows vertically to the bookstacks. The main reading room measured nearly 200 feet (61 m) by 41 feet (12 m) and 31 feet (9.4 m) high, lit by 25 round-headed clerestory windows on each side. At the time of its opening in 1934, The Times commented that the building displayed "the same enjoyment of modelling in mass which is Sir Giles Scott's chief personal contribution to contemporary architecture."

Scott was elected president of the Royal Institute of British Architects for 1933, its centenary year (having already been awarded the RIBA's prestigious Royal Gold Medal in 1925). In his presidential address he urged colleagues to adopt what he called "a middle line": to combine the best of tradition with a fresh modern approach, to eschew dogma, and recognise "the influence of surroundings on the choice of materials and the technique of their use. … My plea is for a frank and common-sense acceptance of those features and materials which are practical and beautiful, regardless as to whether they conform with the formula of either the modern or the traditional school."

From 1937 to 1940, Scott worked on the New Bodleian Library, in Broad Street in Oxford. It is not generally considered his finest work. Needing to provide storage for millions of books without building higher than the surrounding structures, he devised a construction going deep into the earth, behind two elevations no higher than those around them. His biographer A S G Butler commented, "In an attempt to be polite to these – which vary from late Gothic to Victorian Tudor – Scott produced a not very impressive neo-Jacobean design". A later biographer, Gavin Stamp, praises the considerable technical achievement of keeping the building low in scale by building underground, but agrees that aesthetically the building is not among Scott's most successful. Nikolaus Pevsner dismisses it as "neither one thing nor the other".

=== 1940s ===
Scott's search for the "middle line" caused him difficulties when he was appointed as architect for the new Coventry Cathedral in 1942. Pressured by the new Bishop of Coventry for a modern design and by the Royal Fine Arts Commission for a recreation of the old cathedral, he was criticised for trying to compromise between the two and designing a building that was neither fish nor fowl. Unable to reconcile these differences Scott resigned in 1947; a competition was held and won by Basil Spence with an uncompromisingly modern design.

After the Commons chamber of the Palace of Westminster was destroyed by bombs in 1941, Scott was appointed in 1944 to rebuild it. Here he was hemmed in entirely by the surviving building, but was entirely of the view that the new chamber should be congruent with the old as anything else would clash with the Gothic style of Charles Barry and Augustus Pugin. This view found favour with Winston Churchill who observed "We shape our buildings and afterwards our buildings shape us". In a debate on 25 January 1945, the House of Commons approved his choice by 121 to 21.

=== Last years ===
After the immediate rush for building work caused by war damage had died down, Scott put a new roof on the Guildhall in the City of London and designed modernistic brick offices for the Corporation just to the north. Despite having opposed placing heavily industrial buildings in the centre of cities, he accepted a commission to build Bankside Power Station on the bank of the River Thames in Southwark, where he built on what he had learnt at Battersea and gathered all the flues into a single tower. This building was converted in the late 1990s into Tate Modern art gallery.

Scott continued to receive commissions for religious buildings. At Preston, Lancashire he built a Roman Catholic church, St Anthony of Padua on Cadley Causeway (1959), which is notable for an unusually long and repetitive nave. His Carmelite Church in Kensington, up the road from St Mary Abbots built by his grandfather, used transverse concrete arches to fill a difficult site (the church replaced another lost in the war). Scott created the design of the Trinity College Chapel in Toronto, completed in 1955, a lovely example of perpendicular Gothic, executed by the local firm of George and Moorhouse and featuring windows by E. Liddall Armstrong of Whitefriars.

Scott remained working into his late 70s. He was working on designs for the Roman Catholic Church of Christ the King, Plymouth, when he developed lung cancer. He took the designs into University College Hospital, where he continued to revise them until his death aged 79.

=== Burial and grave ===
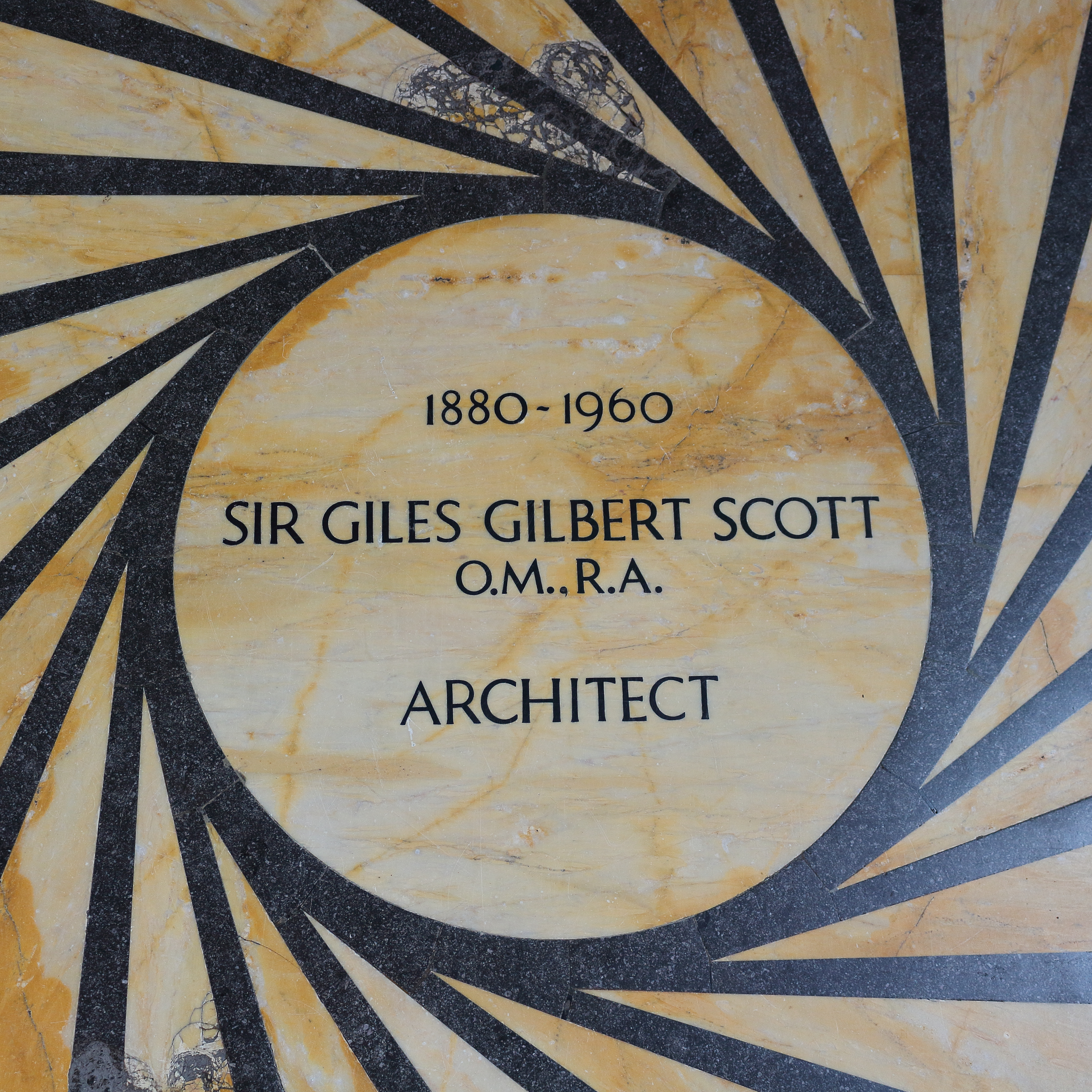
Memorial to Scott, inside Liverpool Cathedral, set into the floor beneath the central tower

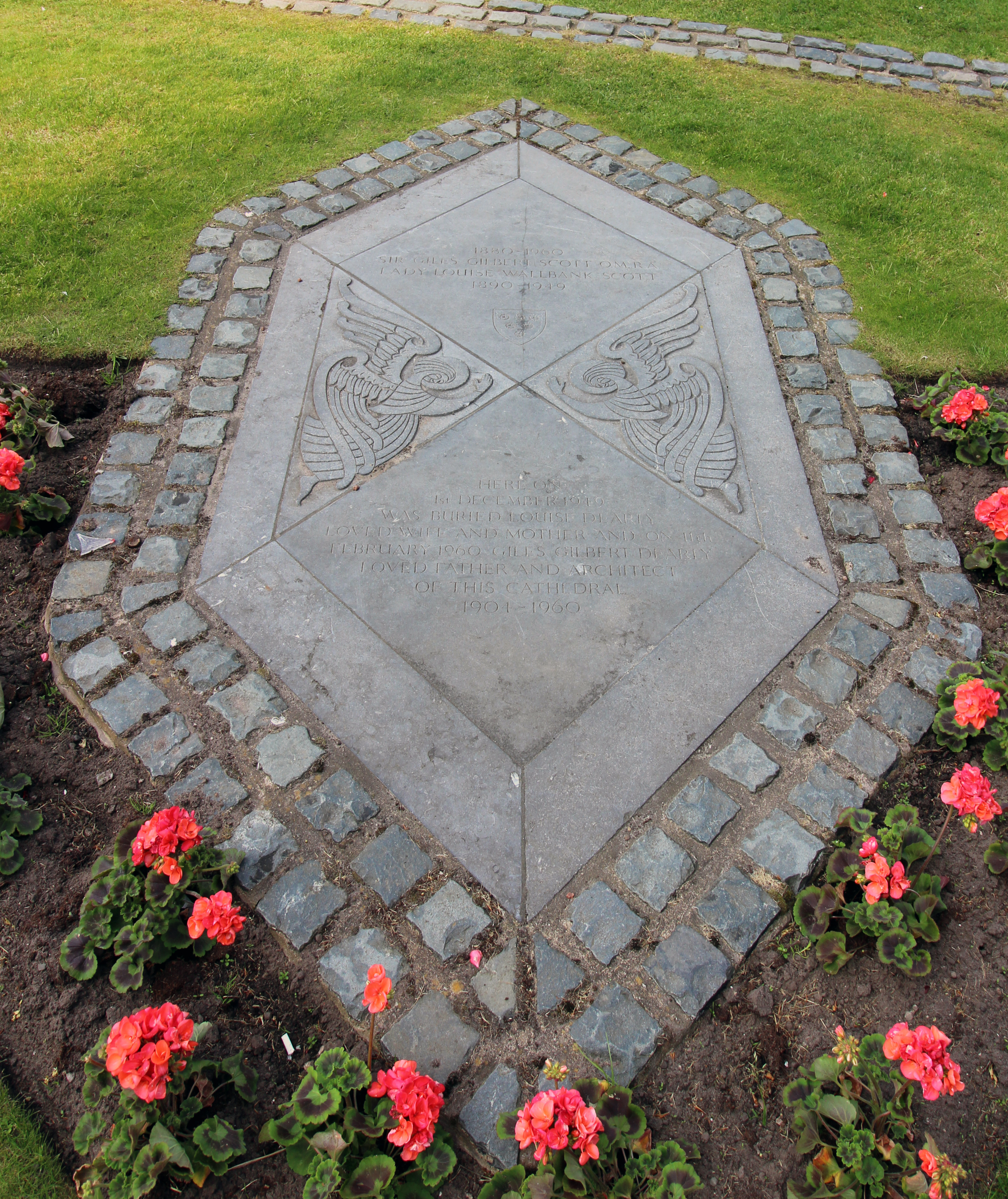
Scott's grave at Liverpool Cathedral

Scott was buried by the monks of Ampleforth Abbey outside the west entrance of Liverpool Cathedral, alongside his wife (Scott specifically requested that no body should be interred inside the building as he did not want it to become a mausoleum). Although originally planned in the 1942 design for the west end of the cathedral to be within a porch, the site of the grave was eventually covered by a car park access road. The road layout was changed, the grave was restored and the grave marker replaced in 2012.

A requiem mass for Scott was celebrated by Father Patrick Casey at the Roman Catholic St James's, Spanish Place, London, on 17 February 1960.

=== Family ===
In addition to his father and grandfather, other members of Scott's family who were architects included an uncle, John Oldrid Scott, a brother, Adrian Gilbert Scott and son Richard Gilbert Scott.

== Honours ==
Following the consecration of Liverpool Cathedral, Scott was knighted by King George V at Knowsley Hall, where the King and Queen were staying as guests of the 17th Earl of Derby.

In the 1944 Birthday Honours, he was appointed a Member of the Order of Merit (OM) by King George VI.

On 9 November 2020, the 140th anniversary of Scott's birth, he was honoured with a Google Doodle depicting his red telephone boxes.

== Works ==
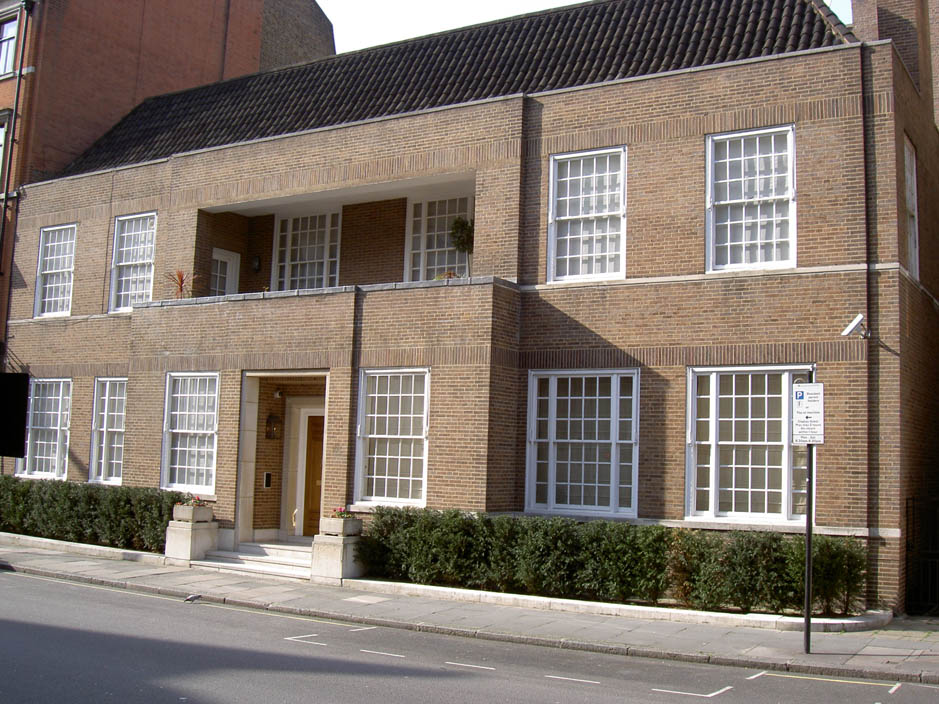
22 Weymouth Street

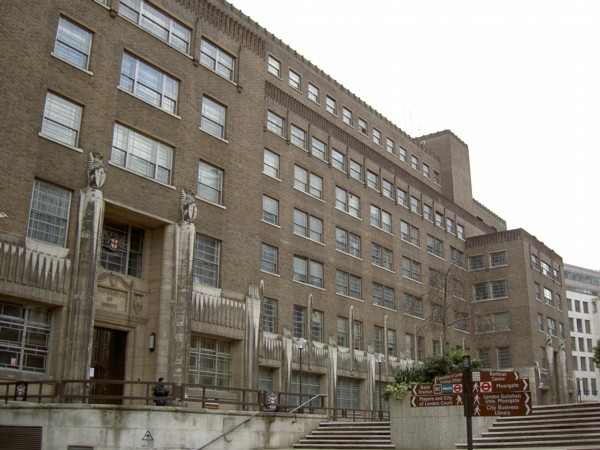
North Block at Guildhall

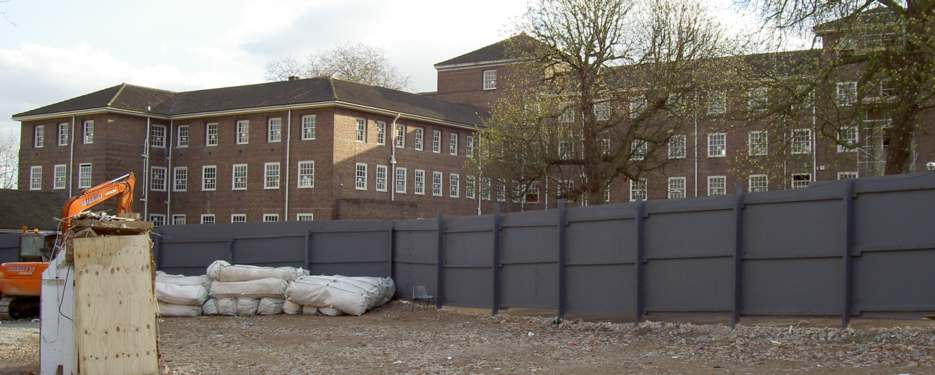
Whitelands Teacher Training College, pictured in 2005 while undergoing conversion to residential accommodation.

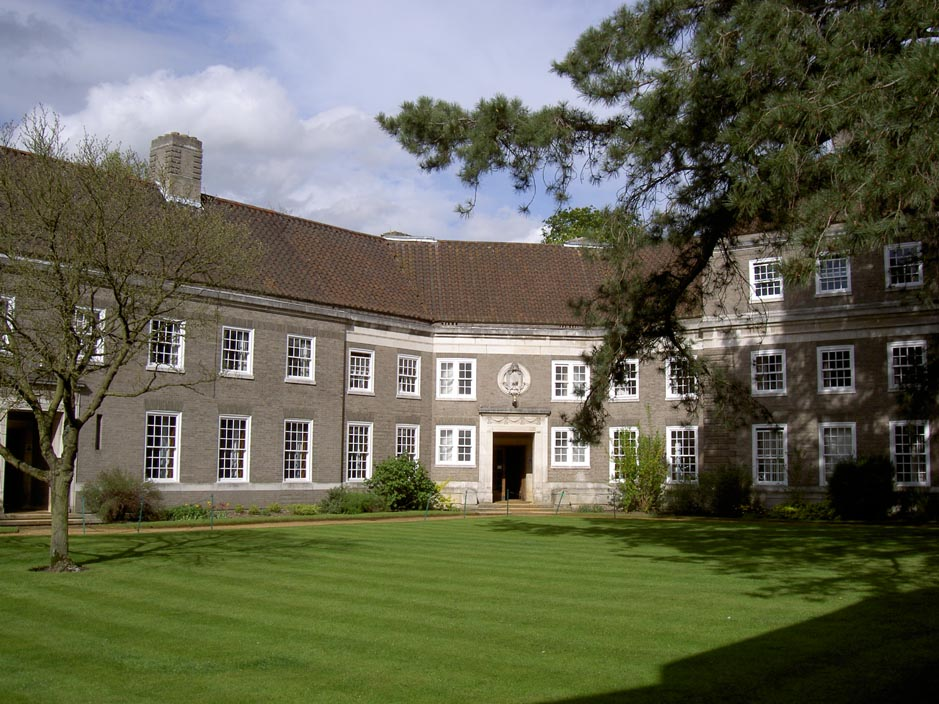
Clare College, Cambridge Memorial Court

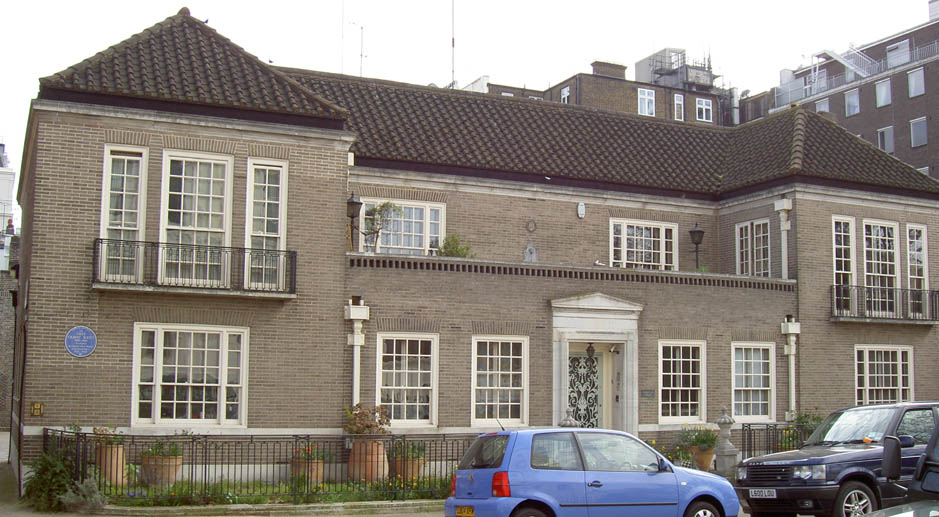
Chester House

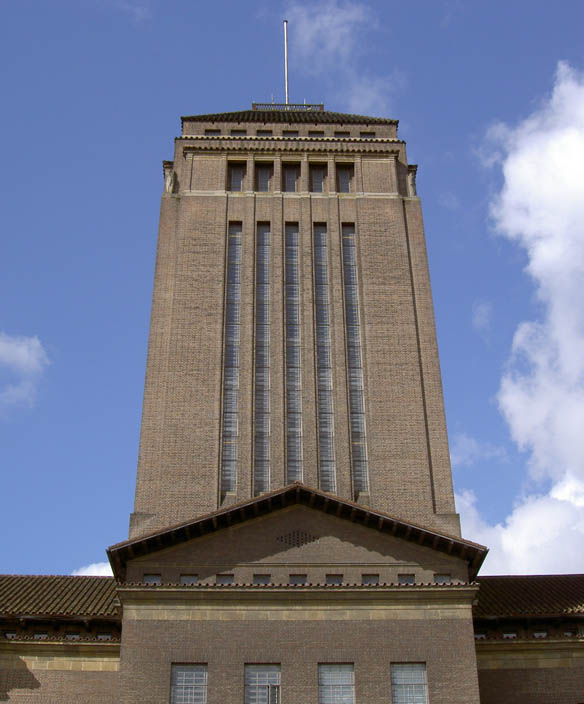
Tower at the Cambridge University Library

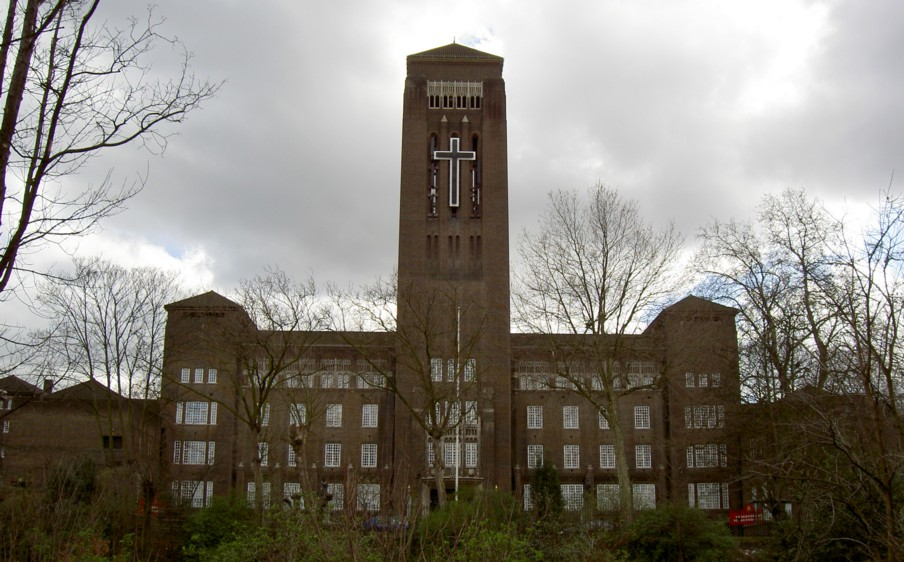
William Booth Memorial Training College

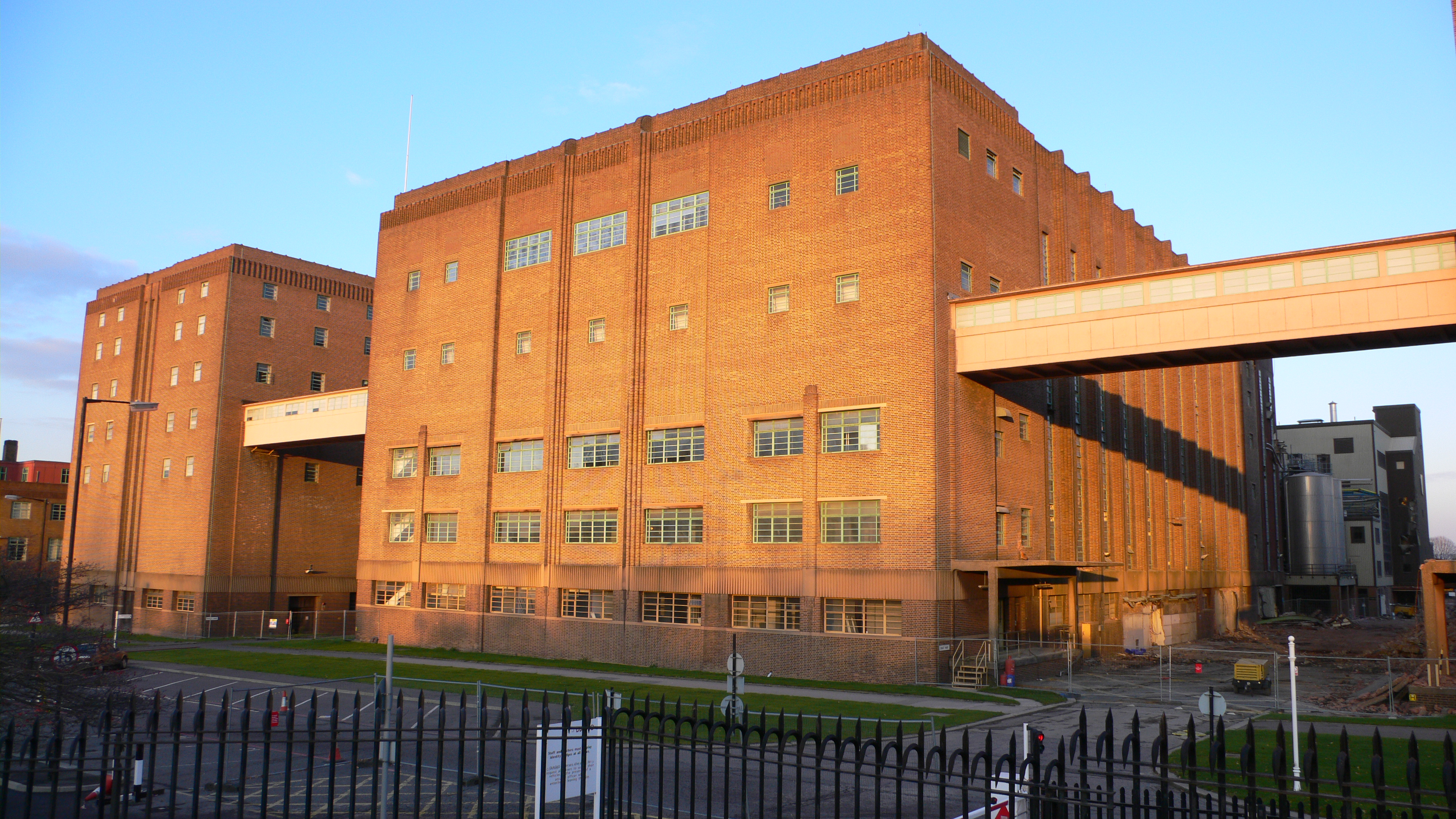
Guinness Brewery Park Royal, during demolition

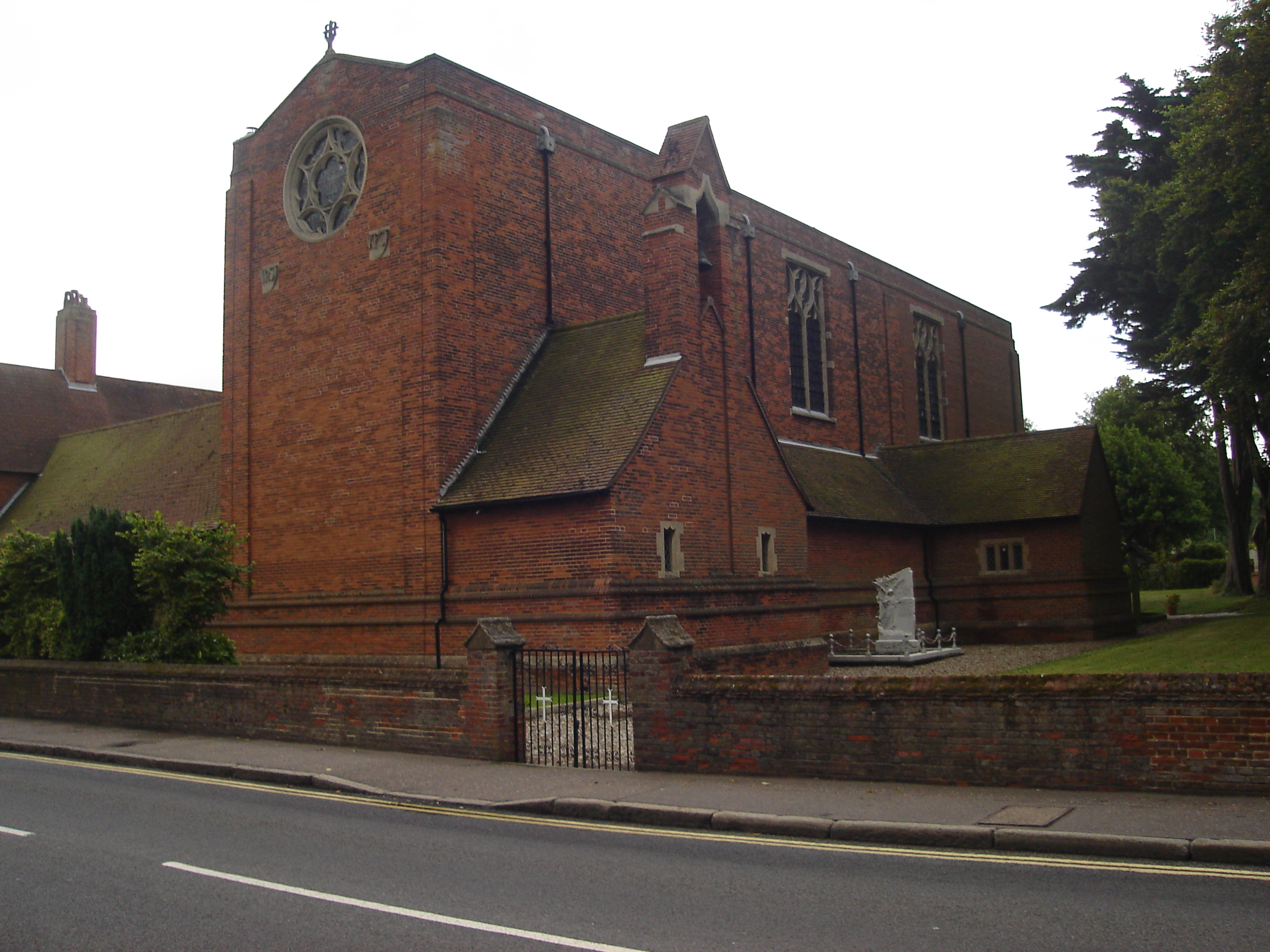
Saint Joseph's Church, Sheringham, built between 1910 and 1936

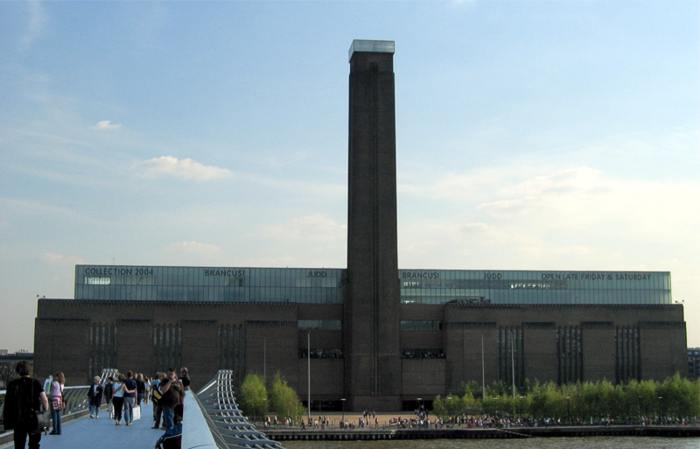
Bankside Power Station (now Tate Modern), London, completed in 1963

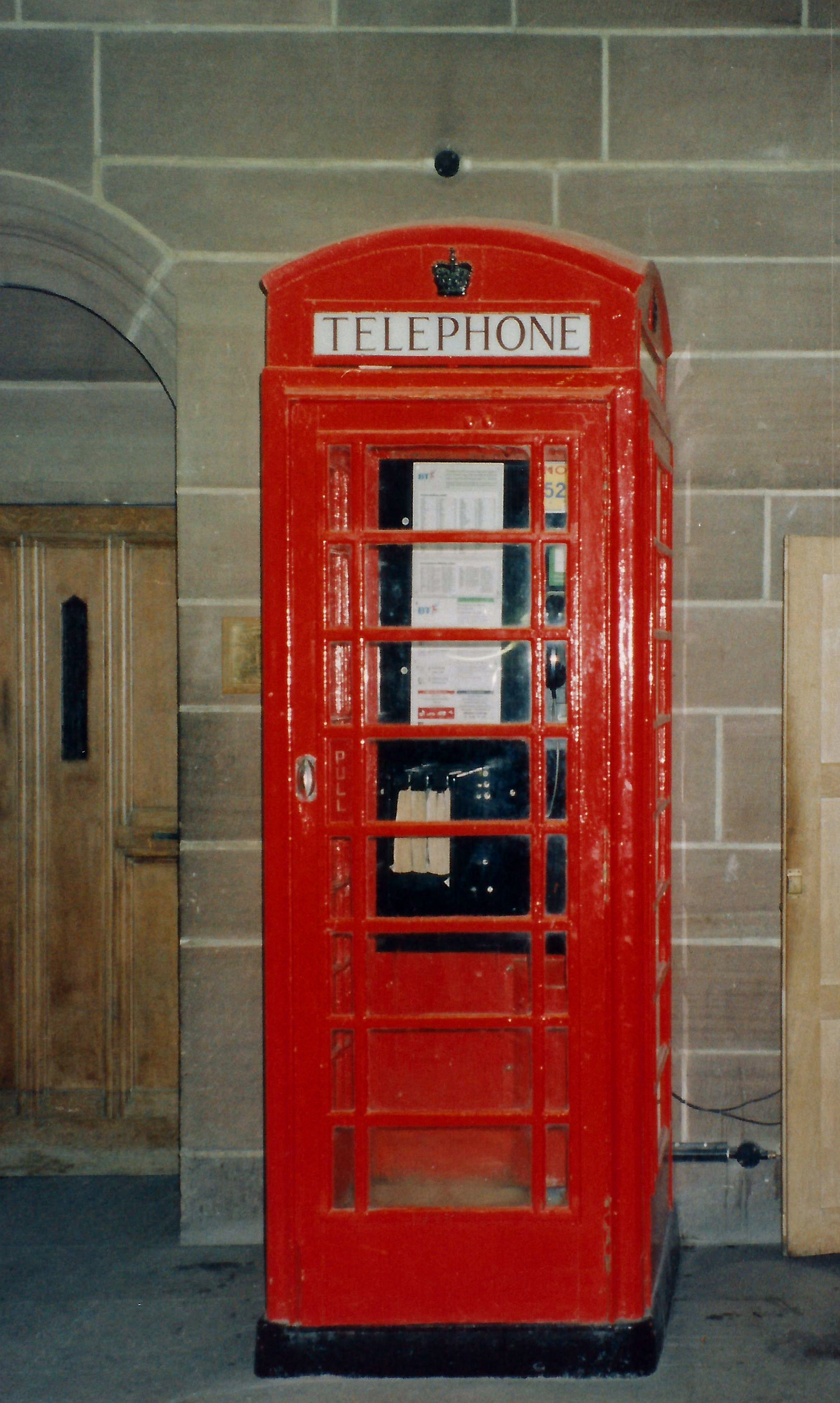
A K6 telephone box in the Liverpool Anglican cathedral, both designed by Giles Gilbert Scott.

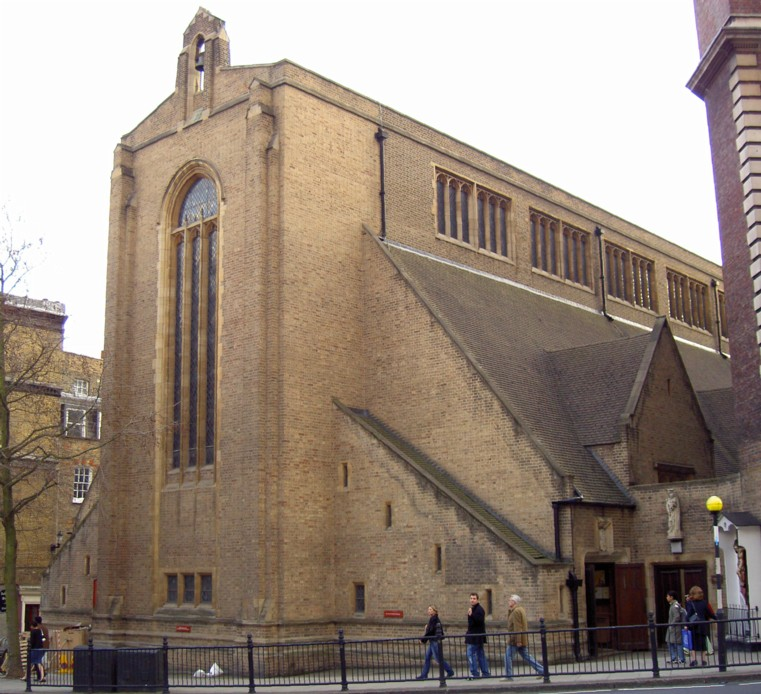
Our Lady of Mount Carmel Church, Kensington

Work	Place	Date	Notes
St Botolph's Church	Carlton-in-Cleveland, Yorkshire	1896–97	Designed by Temple Moore with Scott as clerk of works
Liverpool Cathedral	Liverpool	1903–60	Completed posthumously in 1978
Nanfans (private house)	Prestwood, Buckinghamshire	1903	
Chapel in London Road	Harrow, London	1905–06	
Church of the Annunciation (RC)	Bournemouth, Dorset	1906	With George Frederick Bodley, Grade II* listed
Church of the Holy Ghost	Midsomer Norton, Somerset	1907–13	Conversion of a tithe barn for use as a church
Nave seating, All Saints' Church	Bubwith, Yorkshire	1909	
East window, St Giles's Church	Burnby, Yorkshire	1909	
Our Lady Star of the Sea and St Maughold Church (RC)	Ramsey, Isle of Man	1909–12	
Nave, St Mary's Church	Bury, Lancashire	c. 1910	
St Joseph's Church (RC)	Sheringham, Norfolk	1910–36	
Chester Cathedral, restoration	Chester, Cheshire	1911–13	Cloisters, east window of refectory, rood in the crossing
Grey Wings	Ashtead, Surrey	1913	With his brother Adrian, Grade II listed
Chancel of All Hallows' Church	Gospel Oak, London	1913–15	
Church of Our Lady of the Assumption (RC)	Northfleet, Kent	1913–16	
Lady Chapel reredos, St Michael's Church (RC)	Elswick, Newcastle upon Tyne	1914	
Rood Beam, St Deiniol's Church	Hawarden, Flintshire	1915–16	
St Paul's Church, Stoneycroft	Liverpool	1916	
129 Grosvenor Road	London	c. 1918	Loggia, private house for Arthur Stanley
Chancel, St Catherine's Church	Pontypridd, Glamorgan	1919	
War memorial	Hanmer, Flintshire	1919	
War memorial	Hawarden, Flintshire	1919–20	
War memorial, St Saviour's Church	Oxton, Birkenhead, Cheshire	1920	
War memorial cross, Our Lady of Victories Church (RC)	Clapham, London	1920	
Alterations to south chancel chapel, Church of St Mary Abbot	Kensington, London	1920–21	
War Memorial Chapel at the Church of St Michael, Chester Square	Belgravia, London	1920–21	
Rectory War memorial tablet and northern aisle screen, Holy Trinity Church	Trefnant, Denbighshire	1921	
War Memorial, Beaumont College	Beaumont House, Old Windsor	1921	With his brother Adrian
New church, Ampleforth Abbey	Gilling East, Yorkshire	1922–1924	Second phase, completed 1958–1961
Extensions to Junior House, Ampleforth College	Gilling East, Yorkshire	1920s−30s	Building now known as "Alban Roe House"
Memorial Court, Clare College	Cambridge	1923–34	
Nave (a memorial to Downside boys killed in the First World War)	Downside Abbey, Somerset	c. 1923–25	
K2 red telephone box		1924	
Reconstruction of St George's Church	Kidderminster, Worcestershire	After 1924	
Wigan War Memorial, All Saints' Church	Wigan, Lancashire	1925	
Church of St Alban and St Michael	Golders Green, London	1925	Built 1932–33
Chester House, Clarendon Place	Paddington, London	1925–26	His own home
Charterhouse School chapel	Godalming, Surrey	1922; completed and consecrated 1927	The largest war memorial in England
War memorial (Market Square), and municipal roll of honour in the Harris Museum	Preston, Lancashire	1923–27; completed and unveiled 1927	
All Saints' Church	Wallasey, Cheshire	1927–39	Uncompleted
Church of St Michael	Ashford, Surrey	1928	Uncompleted
Memorial Chapel Bromsgrove School	Bromsgrove, Worcestershire	1928–39	
Continuation of the north range, St Swithun's Buildings, Magdalen College	Oxford	1928–30	
William Booth Memorial Training College	Camberwell, London	1929	
St Ninian's Church (RC)	Restalrig, Edinburgh	1929	Uncompleted
Church of Our Lady and St Alphege	Oldfield Park, Bath	1929	
St Francis of Assisi Church	High Wycombe, Buckinghamshire	1929–30	
Whitelands College	Wandsworth	1929–31	
Plinth for statue of Sir Joshua Reynolds Burlington House	Piccadilly, London	1929–31	
Battersea Power Station	London	1929–35	Consultant on exteriors
North East Tower, Our Lady of Grace and St Edward Church (RC)	Chiswick, London	1930	
K3 red telephone box		1930	
Phoenix Theatre Charing Cross Road	London	1930	With Bertie Crewe
Altar, St Augustine's	Kilburn, London	1930	
St Columba's Cathedral	Oban, Argyll	1930–53	
Cropthorne Court private residences)	Maida Vale, London	1930–37	
Apse and north tower, Church of Our Lady Star of the Sea (RC)	Broadstairs, Kent	1930–31	
Classroom range, Gilling Castle	Gilling East, Yorkshire	After 1930	
St Andrew's Church	Luton	1931–32	
Deneke Building and Chapel, Lady Margaret Hall	Oxford	1931–33	
New University Library	Cambridge	1931–34	
Whitelands College, West Hill	Putney, London	1931	
Vincent House, Pembridge Square, Notting Hill	Kensington	1932–35	Consultant
Clergy House for St Francis of Assisi Church	High Wycombe, Buckinghamshire	1933	
Guinness Brewery	Park Royal, London	1933–35	Demolished 2006
Buildings in north court, Trinity Hall	Cambridge	1934	
Font Church of St Michael, Chester Square	Belgravia, London	1934	
Additions to St Joseph's Church (RC)	Sheringham, Norfolk	1934	
Restoration of St Etheldreda's Church (RC), Ely Place	Holborn, London	1935	
Fountains House, Park Lane	London	1935–38	Consultant
K6 red telephone box		1935	
Main Building, University of Southampton	Southampton, Hampshire	1935	In association with Gutteridge and Gutteridge
Private house, 22 Weymouth Street	Marylebone, London	1936	
New Bodleian Library	Oxford	1937–40	Reconstructed as Weston Library by WilkinsonEyre 2011–15
Alterations to barn at Denham Golf Club	Denham, Buckinghamshire	1938	
Hartland House, St Anne's College	Oxford	1938	Extended in 1973
High pedestal for King George V monument, Old Palace Yard	Westminster	1939	
North and South Blocks, County Hall	London	1939 and 1950–58	
Waterloo Bridge	London	1937–40	
Kepier power station	Durham	1940s	Never built
Chamber of the House of Commons	Westminster	1945–50	
War memorial, St John the Baptist Church	Penshurst, Kent	1947	
Forth Road Bridge	Edinburgh	1947, constructed 1958–60	Consultant
Bankside Power Station	London	1947, constructed 1947–63	Converted to Tate Modern art gallery by Herzog & de Meuron 1995–2000
Extension to St Anne's College	Oxford	1949–51	
Rye House Power Station	Hoddesdon, Hertfordshire	c. 1952	Demolished early 1990s
St Leonard's Church	St Leonards-on-Sea, Sussex	1953–61	With his brother Adrian
Roof for the bomb-damaged Guildhall	City of London	1953–54	
Extension at Clare Memorial Court, Clare College	Cambridge	1953–55	
Our Lady of Mount Carmel Church (RC)	Kensington, London	1954–59	
St Anthony's Church (RC)	Preston, Lancashire	1954–59	
Offices for the City of London Corporation Guildhall	City of London	1955–58	Alterations and refurbishment proposed
Chapel of Trinity College	Toronto, Canada	1955	
North Tees Power Station	Billingham, County Durham	1950s	Demolished
St Mark's Church	Biggin Hill, London Borough of Bromley	1957–59	
Church of Christ the King (RC)	Plymouth, Devon	1961–62	Built posthumously
