= Our Lady of Mount Carmel and St Simon Stock =

Carmelite church in West London

Coordinates: 51.503838°N 0.192567°W

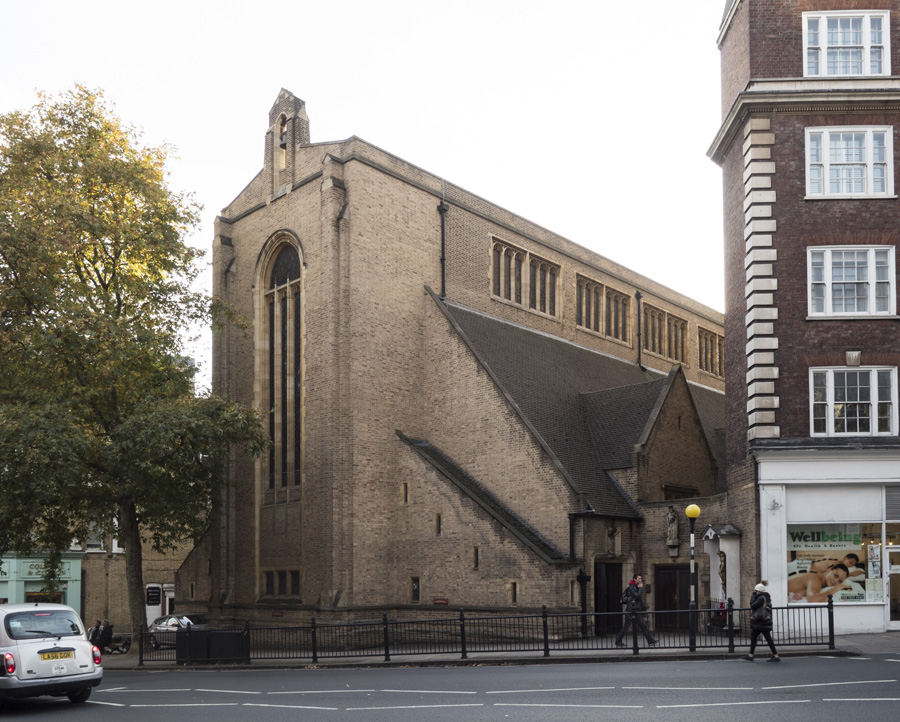
Our Lady of Mount Carmel and St Simon Stock

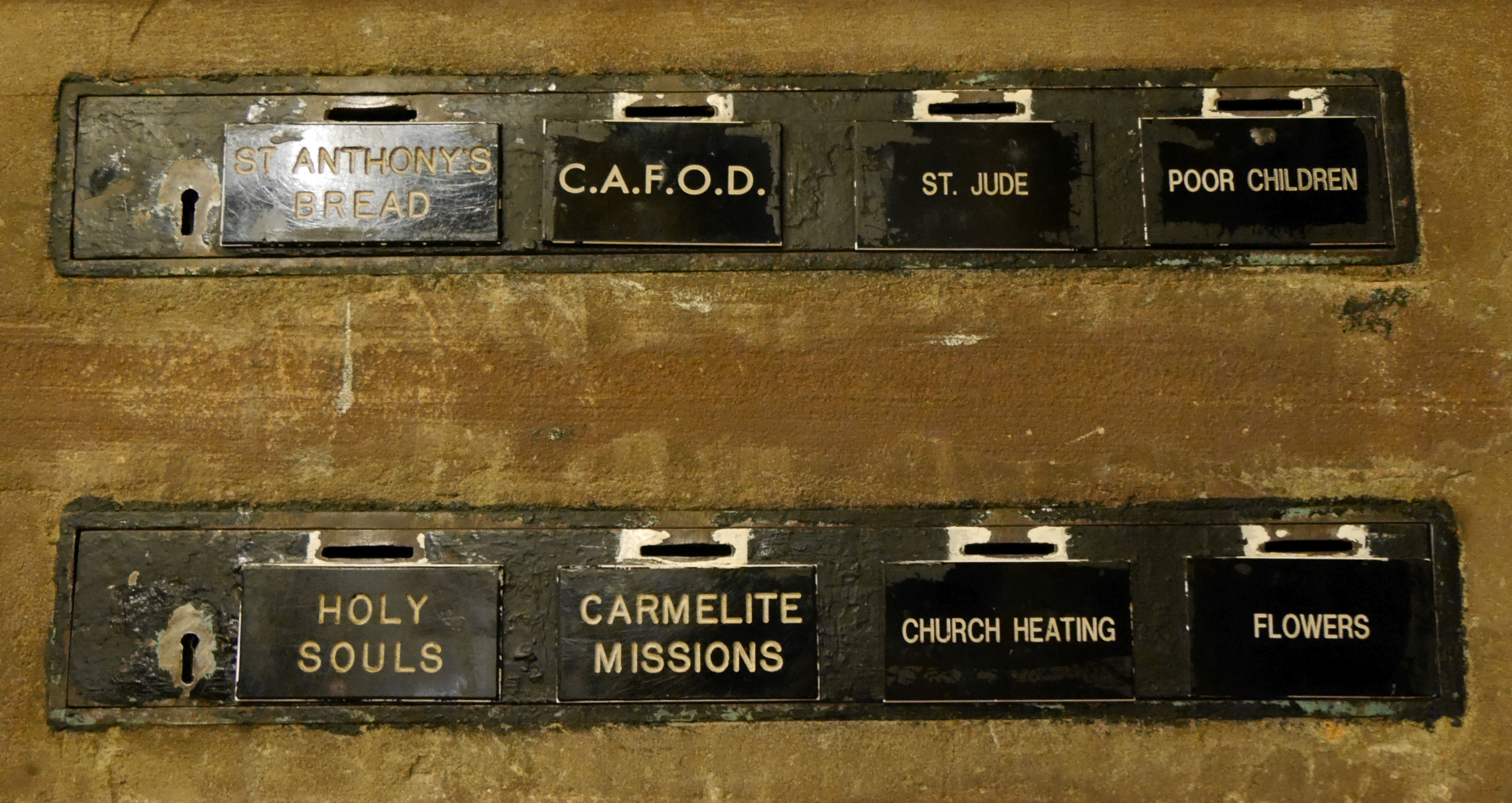
Collection boxes

The church of Our Lady of Mount Carmel and St Simon Stock is a Roman Catholic church at 41 Kensington Church Street, Kensington, London W8, served by Discalced Carmelites.

It is a Grade II listed building, built in 1954 to 1959, and designed by Sir Giles Gilbert Scott.

The Carmelite Priory next door is also a Grade II listed building, built in 1886 to 1889 by Goldie, Child and Goldie.

The church is part of the Roman Catholic Archdiocese of Westminster and is dedicated to Our Lady of Mount Carmel and Simon Stock.
