= T. Mewburn Crook =

English sculptor (1869–1949)

Mewburn Crook RBS
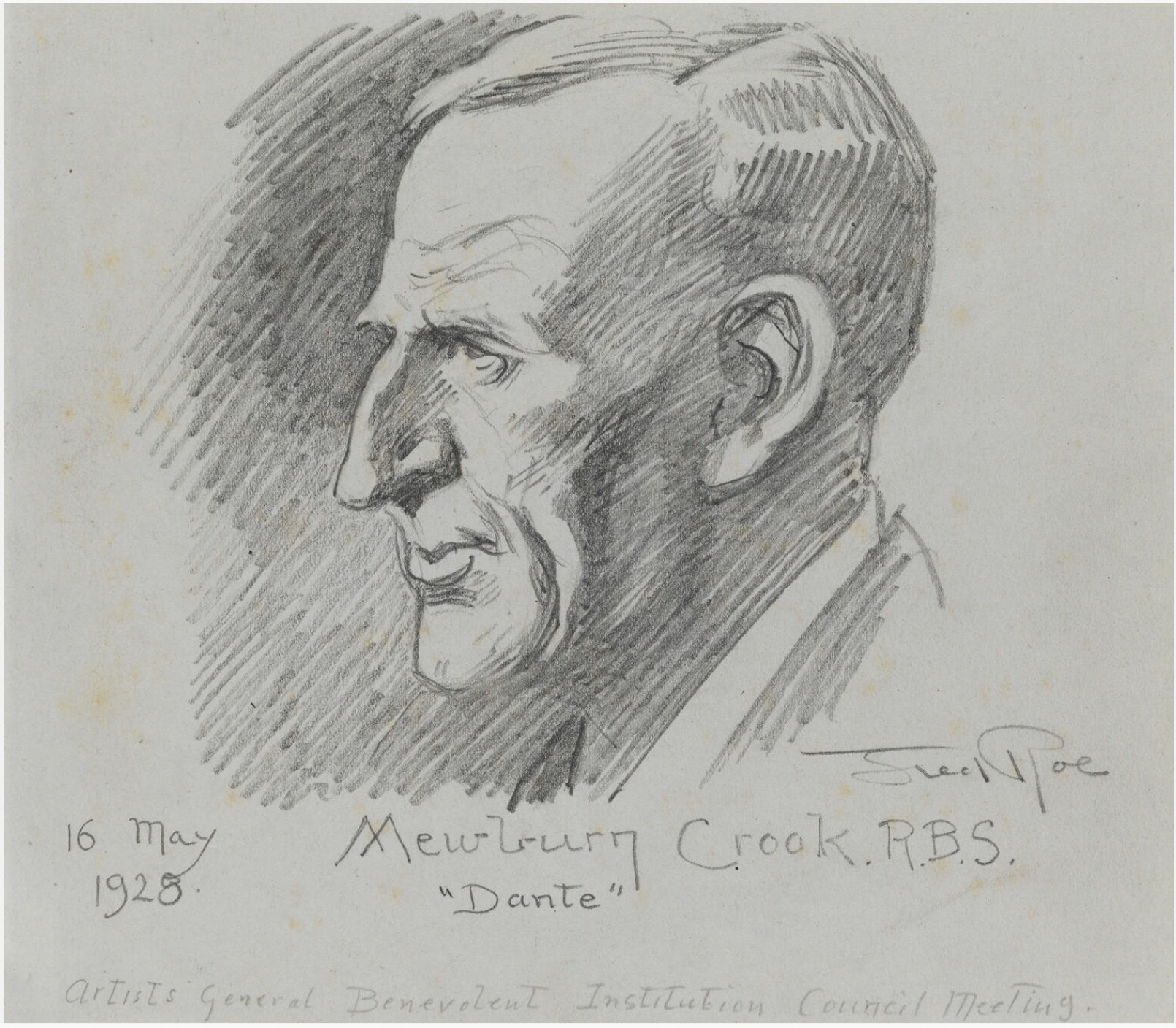
- Pencil of Mewburn Crook by Fred Roe (1928)
- Born: Thomas Mewburn Crook; 4 December 1869; Tonge Moor, Bolton
- Died: 18 January 1949 (aged 79); Chiswick, London
- Education: Manchester School of Art; Royal College of Art
- Occupation: Sculptor
- Website: tmewburncrook.com

Thomas Mewburn Crook (4 December 1869 – 18 January 1949) was an English sculptor who primarily produced portraiture and ecclesiastical works, many of which were exhibited at the Royal Academy of Arts.

== Biography ==
Crook was born at Tonge Moor, Bolton, Lancashire, son of cotton dealer James Crook and his wife Dinah (née Hamilton). He was educated at the Xavierian Collegiate School in Chorlton-on-Medlock, Bolton Art School, and the Manchester School of Art (where he graduated with an Art Master's Certificate), before attending the Royal College of Art in London. After working as an assistant modelling master at the Royal College of Art from 1894 to 1895, he returned to Manchester, becoming modelling master and anatomy lecturer at the Manchester School of Art from 1896 to 1905, when he moved to Chiswick in West London with his widowed mother and sisters and set up a practice.

Crook was an honorary Associate of the Royal College of Art from 1902, was elected a member of the Royal Society of British Artists in 1910 (being Hon. Secretary from 1913 to after World War II), and became a Fellow of the Royal Society of British Sculptors in 1923.

With his wife, Winifred, a mosaicist (née Saunders; she had been Crook's assistant), Crook had five children. He lived at Chiswick until his death in 1949.

== Works ==
Crook's early work included decorative reliefs for Manchester Council Chamber and a life size plaster figure of St Patrick for the Church of the Sacred Heart, Thornton-Cleveleys, Liverpool.

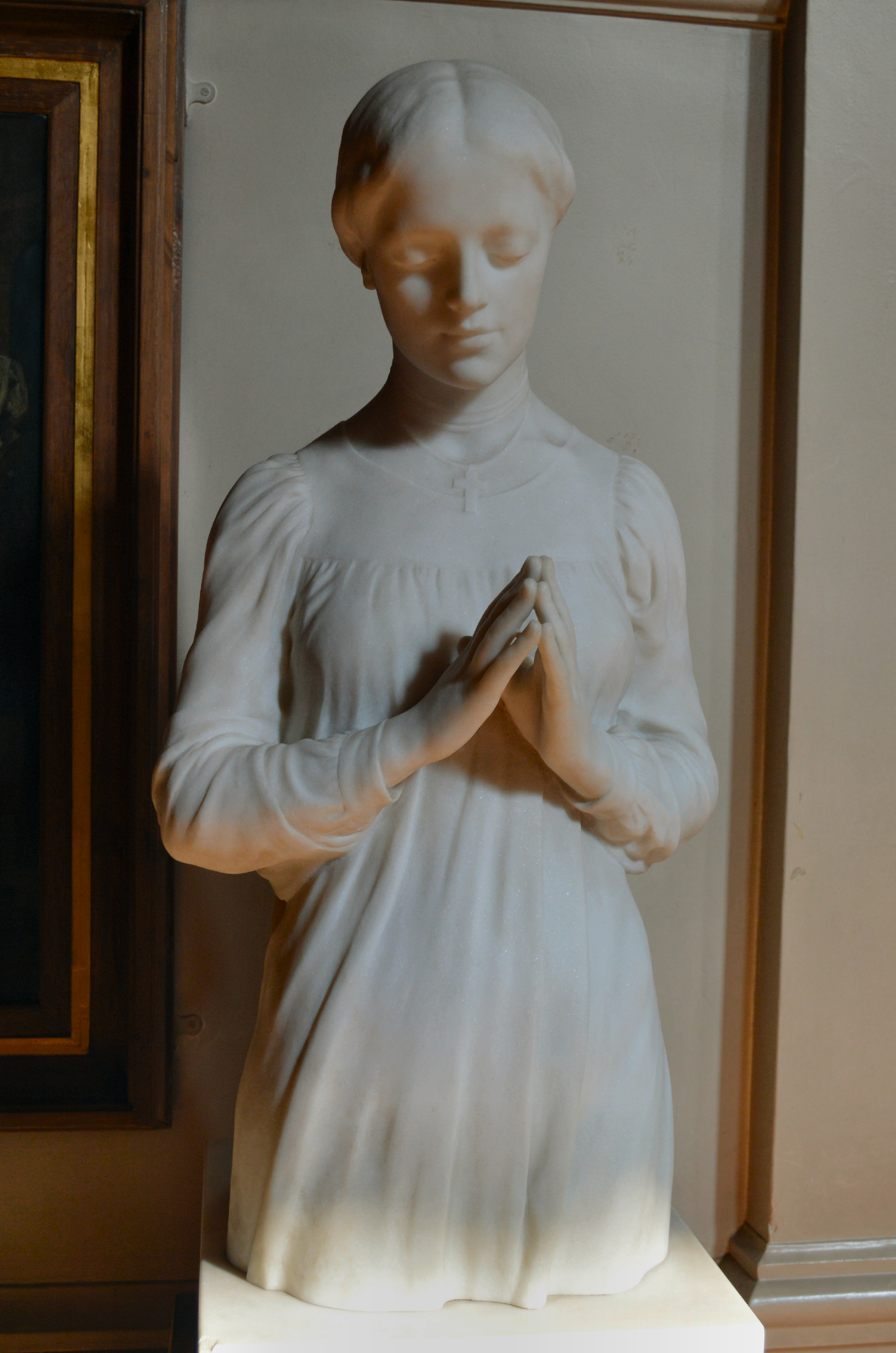
Prayer

Amongst his notable works are: a 1916 sculpture of the Welsh British Army officer Thomas Picton, who fought in the Napoleonic Wars and was the most senior officer to die at the Battle of Waterloo, a 1939 sculpture of King George VI, and a 1939 sculpture of Pope Pius XII. Collections of his works exist at St Mary's Church, Standishgate, Wigan; St Mark's Church, North Audley Street, London; St Catherine's Church, Rotherhithe; The National Memorial Arboretum; City Hall, Cardiff; New Malden Library. His work is also represented as war memorials in Streetly, Felixstowe, Caterham and Raynes Park.

After a bomb struck the church of Our Lady of Grace, Chiswick, which Crook and his family attended, in 1944, he endeavoured to repair considerable damage done to the Stations of the Cross produced by nineteenth-century Belgian artist Charles Bayaert. Crook's declining health prevented him from completing the restoration, which his widow continued.

In 2019, 'Prayer', the first of Crook's works to be exhibited at the Royal Academy, was given by the family to the parish of Our Lady of Grace, Chiswick, having previously been owned by Crook's daughter, Sister Bernadette Crook, herself an internationally renowned painter of icons, who died in 2018.
