= Salvation Army Centre, Teddington =

Church in Richmond, London, England

Coordinates: 51.4274°N 0.3377°W

Salvation Army Centre, Teddington is a Salvation Army church at 27 Church Road, Teddington, in the London Borough of Richmond upon Thames.

From 1886 the Salvation Army met in a hall in Queen's Road, moving to their current site in 1914. They have used their existing premises since 1934.
