= Twickenham Museum =

The Twickenham Museum
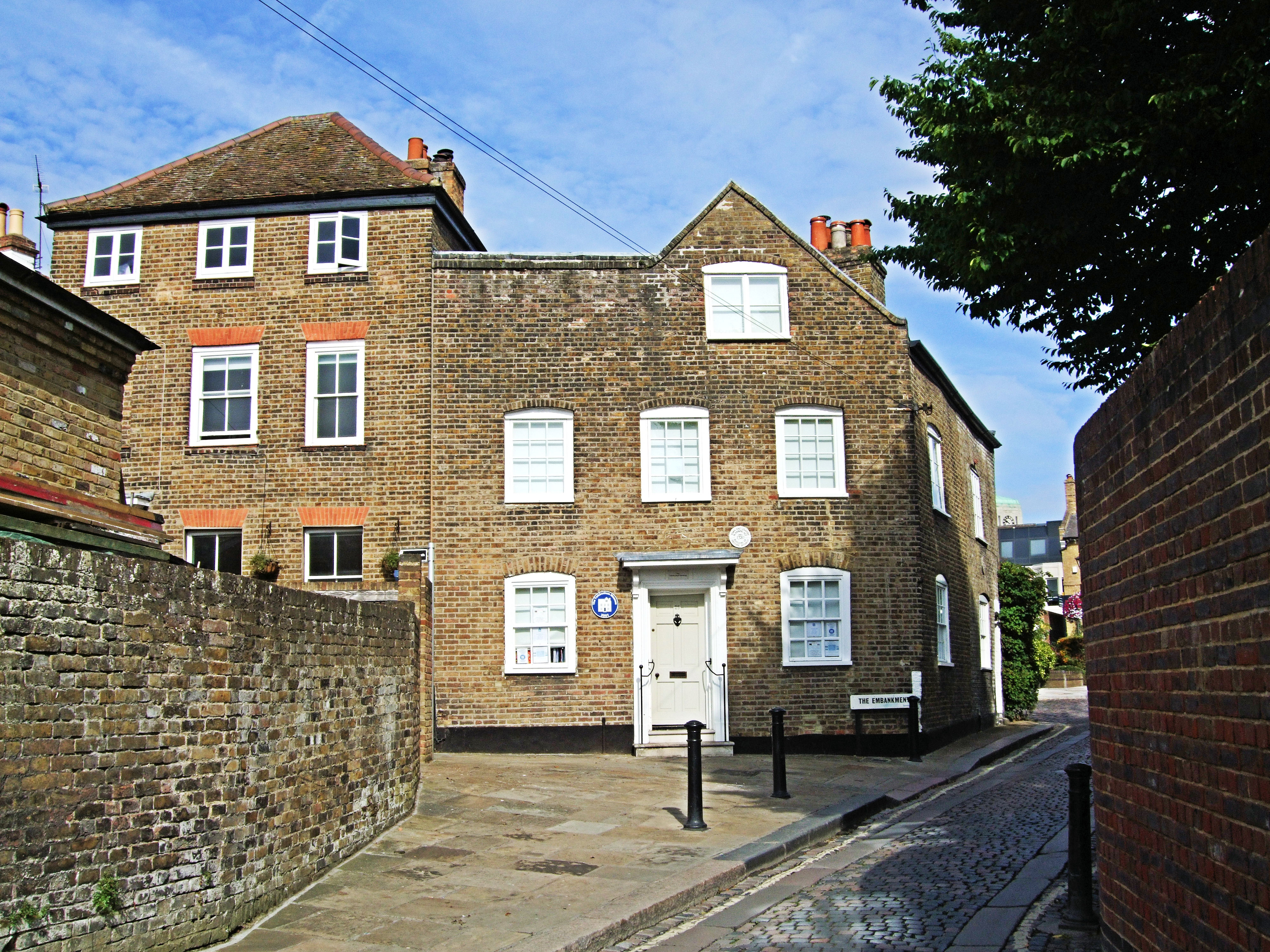
- Established: 1993
- Location: Twickenham, London Borough of Richmond upon Thames, England, UK
- Coordinates: 51°26′48″N 0°19′32″W
- Type: History museum
- Website: www.twickenham-museum.org.uk

Listed Building – Grade II
- Official name: 25 The Embankment, 1, Church Lane
- Designated: 2 September 1952
- Reference no.: 1080818

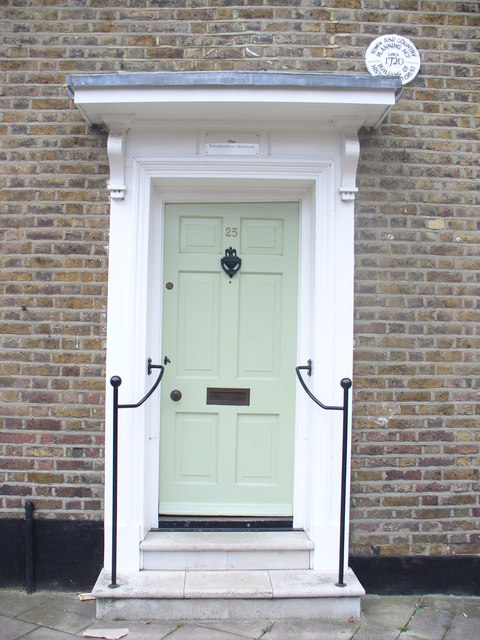
Entrance to 25 The Embankment, a Grade II listed building

The Twickenham Museum is a volunteer-run museum in Twickenham in the London Borough of Richmond upon Thames. It is located opposite St Mary's parish church at 25 The Embankment, Twickenham TW1 3DU, an 18th-century three-storey building which has been listed Grade II by Historic England and was donated to the museum.

An independent museum, the Twickenham Museum is run by a registered charity (Note: It is registered with the Charity Commission for England and Wales as charity number 1028984. "The Twickenham Museum". Charity overview. Charity Commission for England and Wales.) that was first registered in 1993.

The museum's area of interest is the history of Teddington, Twickenham, Whitton and the Hamptons, which, until local government boundary changes in 1965, formed the Municipal Borough of Twickenham. It collects, researches and displays archives, artefacts and information from these areas and provides related historical information on its website. The museum also mounts exhibitions.

In 2014, it received £9000 from the Heritage Lottery Fund's Then and Now programme for a project on the 1914 Christmas truce during the First World War that led to a soldier, Frank Edwards, kicking a football when fighting the Battle of Loos in 1915.

== See also ==
- Eel Pie Island Museum
- Museum of Richmond
- Orleans House Gallery
