= Moneyfield Sports F.C. =

- Full name: Moneyfield Sports Football Club
- Nickname: Planemakers
- Founded: 1934
- Dissolved: 1984
- Ground: Moneyfield Sports Ground, Copnor, Portsmouth
Home colours	Away colours

Moneyfield Sports F.C. were a long-running amateur football club based in Copnor, a suburb of Portsmouth.

In existence for 50 years, the club were mainstays of the Hampshire League (under a number of identities) until their sudden demise in 1984. Despite the name and location, they are not connected to the present day Moneyfields F.C.

== History ==
The club were formed in 1934 as the works side of Airspeed Ltd, who were running Portsmouth Airport and were originally known as Airspeed Portsmouth. They spent their early days playing in the local Portsmouth & District League before the outbreak of World War II.

After the conflict finally finished, the club joined the Hampshire League in 1947. Here, they were placed in Division 3 East and became a steady mid-table side, becoming known as De Havillands in 1951 after that company took over the Airport. This rebranding seemed to inspire the team, as they won the Division 3 title in 1956, and after a series of encouraging seasons they then won the Division 2 title in 1964.

The 'Planemakers' did well to survive in a tough Division 1, which at the time was of a very high standard. There was another name change in 1965 when Hawker-Siddeley took over the site, and in 1968 there was a memorable run in the Hampshire Senior Cup in which they reached the final. Here, they faced hot favourites Fareham Town and narrowly lost 1-2 in front of a large crowd at Fratton Park, Portsmouth.

However, by this point links to the airport had faded and this saw the club became known as Strongs, coinciding with the Reserves election to the county league. A year later, they changed name yet again - this time adopting their best-known identity of Moneyfield Sports - in connection with their home ground. They were relegated in 1971 but soon recovered and won promotion back four years later, remaining a steady top-flight side and performing well in the national FA Vase competition.

In a bid to attract further support, the club was rebranded as Portsmouth United for the 1983/84 campaign, but despite a respectable midtable finish the move proved unsuccessful and they disbanded at the end of that season.

== Honours ==
=== 1st Team ===
- Hampshire League
  - Division 2 Champions 1964/65
  - Division 3 Champions 1955/56
- Hampshire Football Association
  - Senior Cup Finalists 1967/68
  - Intermediate Cup Finalists 1962/63
- Portsmouth Football Association
  - Senior Cup Winners 1973/74 and 1975/76, Finalists 1974/75

== Playing records ==
=== Hampshire League ===
Season	Division	Position	Significant events
1947/48	Division 3 East	7/12	as Airspeed Portsmouth
1948/49	Division 3 East	11/14	
1949/50	Division 3 East	9/14	
1950/51	Division 3 East	4/14	
1951/52	Division 3 East	12/14	as De Havilland
1952/53	Division 3 East	12/14	
1953/54	Division 3 East	7/14	
1954/55	Division 3 East	4/11	
1955/56	Division 3	1/16	Champions - promoted
1956/57	Division 2	12/16	
1957/58	Division 2	7/16	
1958/59	Division 2	11/16	
1959/60	Division 2	10/16	
1960/61	Division 2	14/16	
1961/62	Division 2	5/16	
1962/63	Division 2	3/16	
1963/64	Division 2	1/16	Champions - promoted
1964/65	Division 1	6/16	
1965/66	Division 1	11/16	as Hawker-Siddeley
1966/67	Division 1	11/16	
1967/68	Division 1	9/16	
1968/69	Division 1	12/16	as Strongs
1969/70	Division 1	12/16	as Moneyfield Sports
1970/71	Division 1	16/16	Relegated
1971/72	Division 2	5/16	
1972/73	Division 2	6/16	
1973/74	Division 2	7/16	
1974/75	Division 2	5/16	Promoted
1975/76	Division 1	10/16	
1976/77	Division 1	13/16	
1977/78	Division 1	13/16	
1978/79	Division 1	13/16	
1979/80	Division 1	15/16	Not relegated
1980/81	Division 1	15/20	
1981/82	Division 1	18/20	
1982/83	Division 1	15/20	
1983/84	Division 1	12/20	as Portsmouth United Left competition

=== FA Amateur Cup ===
Season	Round	Opponents	Result
1966/67	1st Qualifying Round	A v Gosport Borough	L 2-3
1967/68	1st Qualifying Round	H v Totton	W 3–0
	2nd Qualifying Round	H v Pirelli General	L 2-4
1968/69	1st Qualifying Round	H v Waterlooville	L 0-2
1969/70	1st Qualifying Round	A v Totton	L 0-4
1970/71	1st Qualifying Round	A v Totton	W 1-0
	2nd Qualifying Round	A v Christchurch	L 1-3
1972/73	1st Qualifying Round	A v Brockenhurst	W 1-0
	2nd Qualifying Round	A v Gosport Borough	L 1-2
1973/74	1st Qualifying Round	A v Pagham	W 3-0
	2nd Qualifying Round	A v Gosport Borough	D 2-2
	Replay	H v Gosport Borough	W 2-1
	3rd Qualifying Round	A v Brockenhurst	L 0-3

=== FA Vase ===
Season	Round	Opponents	Result
1974/75	Round 1	A v Portfield	W 5-4
	Round 2	H v Chichester City	W 3–0
	Round 3	A v Farnborough Town	L 0-1
1975/76	Round 1	A v Camberley Town	W 1-0
	Round 2	A v Chichester City	L 2-4
1976/77	Round 1	H v Portfield	W 4-2
	Round 2	A v Chichester City	L 0-4
1977/78	Preliminary Round	A v Swanage Town & Herston	D 2-2
	Replay	H v Swanage Town & Herston	D 0-0
	Replay	A v Swanage Town & Herston	L 3-4

== Ground ==
The club played at Moneyfields Sports Ground, Dover Road, Copnor, Portsmouth. PO3 6LA.

The ground remains in use today and since 1994 has been home to the modern day Moneyfields F.C. During 2023-24 the venue was redeveloped into a state of art facility with two enclosed 3G artificial pitches. It is now also home to 'Pompey in the Community' and renamed as the John Jenkins Stadium.

== Local rivalries ==
With there being so many teams within the city, the club had many rivals - most notably fellow 'Pompey' Hampshire League sides Portsmouth Royal Navy, McMurdo and Portsmouth Civil Service, who ironically would eventually move to Moneyfields and become the modern day club.
