= St Philip and St James Church, Whitton =

- St Philip and St James Church, Whitton
- 51.45609°N 0.35971°W
- Location: Hounslow Road, Whitton, Twickenham
- Country: England
- Denomination: Church of England
- Website: www.whittonchurch.com

Architecture
- Years built: 1862

Administration
- Diocese: Diocese of London

Clergy
- Vicar: Rev David Cloake
- Priest: Rev Vernon Fray

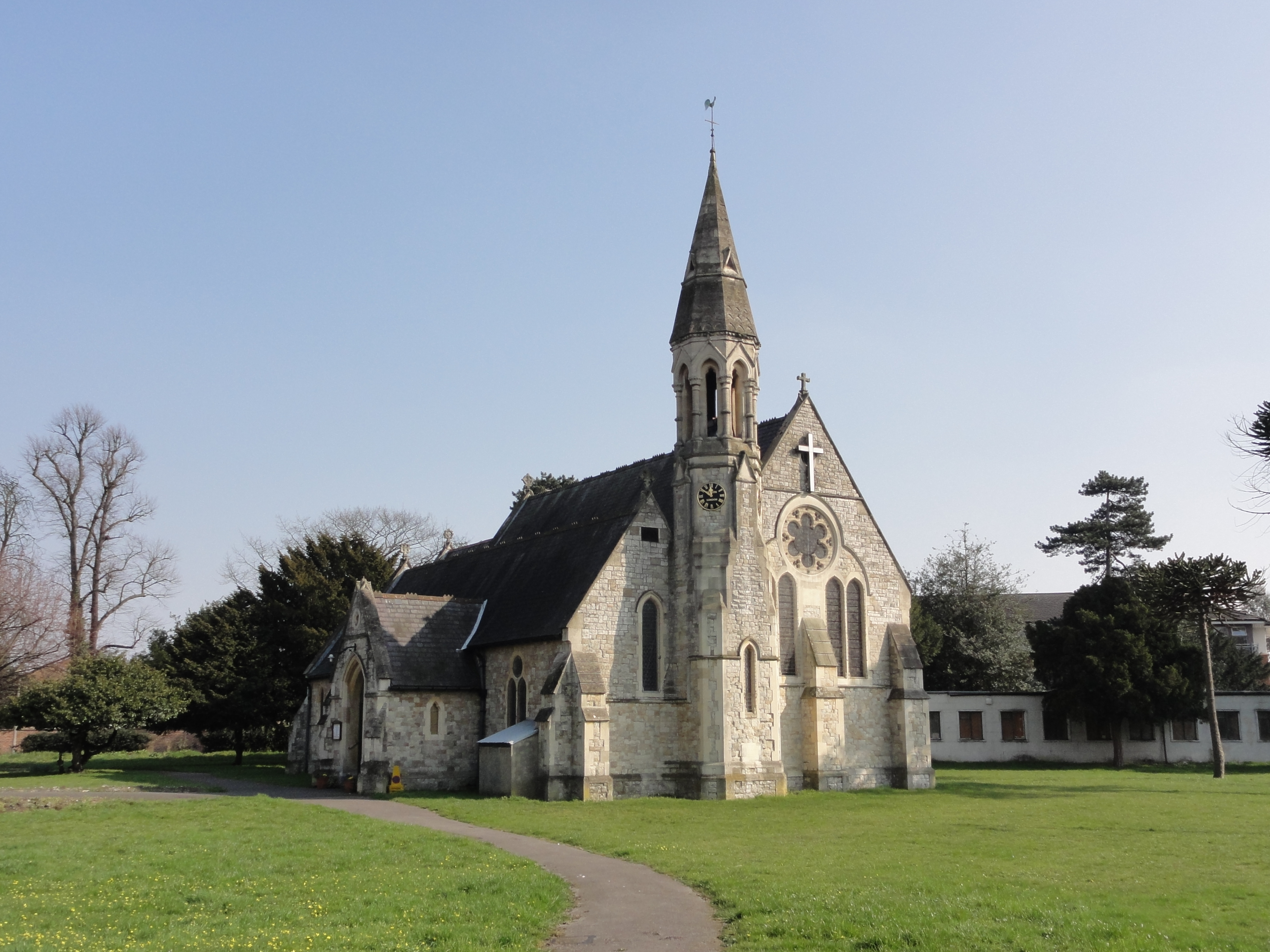
St Philip and St James Church in Whitton - panoramio.jpg

St Philip and St James Church is a Church of England church in Hounslow Road, Whitton, Richmond-upon-Thames, London.

== Building ==
The church building was constructed in 1862 when Whitton separated from St Mary's, Twickenham to become a separate parish. The Gostling family, owners of part of the former estate of the Duke of Argyll, donated land at the junction of Hounslow and Kneller Roads for the new Church and for an adjoining vicarage, since replaced; the architect was F H Pownall. The stained glass windows on the east side of the church are by Clayton and Bell (1862); the window on the west side is by Charles Eamer Kempe (1892). On display in the church is a 15th-century alabaster panel of Christ and Arma Christi, imported from Valle Crucis Abbey, Wales, in 1913.

== Services ==
Services are held on weekdays at 9.30 am and on Sunday mornings and evenings. The style of worship is Modern/Contemporary Catholic.

== Vicar ==
The vicar is Reverend Kate O'Sullivan, a Franciscan Tertiary.
