= Twickenham =

Town in Greater London, England

Coordinates: 51.449°N 0.337°W

- View of King Street in central Twickenham

- Location within Greater London
- Area: 12.36 km^{2} (4.77 sq mi)
- Population: 62,148 (2011 census) (Note: Twickenham is made up of six wards in the London Borough of Richmond upon Thames: Heathfield, St Margarets and North Twickenham, South Twickenham, Twickenham Riverside, West Twickenham, and Whitton. "2011 Census Ward Population Estimates". November 2012. Archived from the original on 22 February 2014.)
  - Density: 5,028/km^{2} (13,020/sq mi)
- OS grid reference: TQ1673
  - Charing Cross: 9.9 mi (15.9 km) NE
- London borough: Richmond
- Ceremonial county: Greater London
- Region: London
- Country: England
- Sovereign state: United Kingdom
- Post town: TWICKENHAM
- Postcode district: TW1, TW2
- Dialling code: 020
- Police: Metropolitan
- Fire: London
- Ambulance: London
- UK Parliament: Twickenham
- London Assembly: South West

Twickenham (/ˈtwɪkənəm/ TWICK-ən-əm) is a suburban town in London, England, on the River Thames 9.9 miles (15.9 km) southwest of Charing Cross. Historically in Middlesex, since 1965 it has formed part of the London Borough of Richmond upon Thames, whose administrative headquarters are in the area.

The population, including St Margarets and Whitton, was 62,148 at the 2011 census.

Twickenham is the home of the Rugby Football Union, with hundreds of thousands of spectators visiting Twickenham Stadium each year. The historic riverside area has a network of 18th-century buildings and pleasure grounds, many of which have survived intact.

This area has three grand period mansions with public access: York House, Marble Hill and Strawberry Hill House. Another has been lost, that belonging to the 18th-century poet Alexander Pope, who was known as the Bard of Twickenham. Strawberry Hill, the Neo-Gothic prototype home of Horace Walpole, is linked with the oldest Roman Catholic university in the country, St Mary's University.

== History ==
=== Pre-Norman ===
Excavations have revealed settlements in the area dating from the Early Neolithic, possibly Mesolithic, periods. Occupation seems to have continued through the Bronze Age, the Iron Age and the Roman occupation. The name Twickenham probably derives from the Old English twiccahamm meaning 'Twicca's hemmed-in land', but it could possibly derive from twicenhamm meaning 'hemmed-in land by a river fork'. The area was first mentioned (as "Tuican hom" and "Tuiccanham") in an 8th-century charter to cede the area to Waldhere, Bishop of London, "for the salvation of our souls". The charter, dated 13 June 704, is signed with 12 crosses. The signatories included Swaefred of Essex, Cenred of Mercia and Earl Paeogthath.

=== Norman ===
In Norman times Twickenham was part of the Manor of Isleworth – itself part of the Hundred of Hounslow, Middlesex (mentioned in Domesday Book of 1086). The manor had belonged to Ælfgār, Earl of Mercia in the time of Edward the Confessor, but was granted to Walter de Saint-Valery (Waleric) by William I of England after the Norman Conquest of England in 1066. The area was farmed, while the river provided opportunities for fishing, boatbuilding and trade.

=== 17th century ===
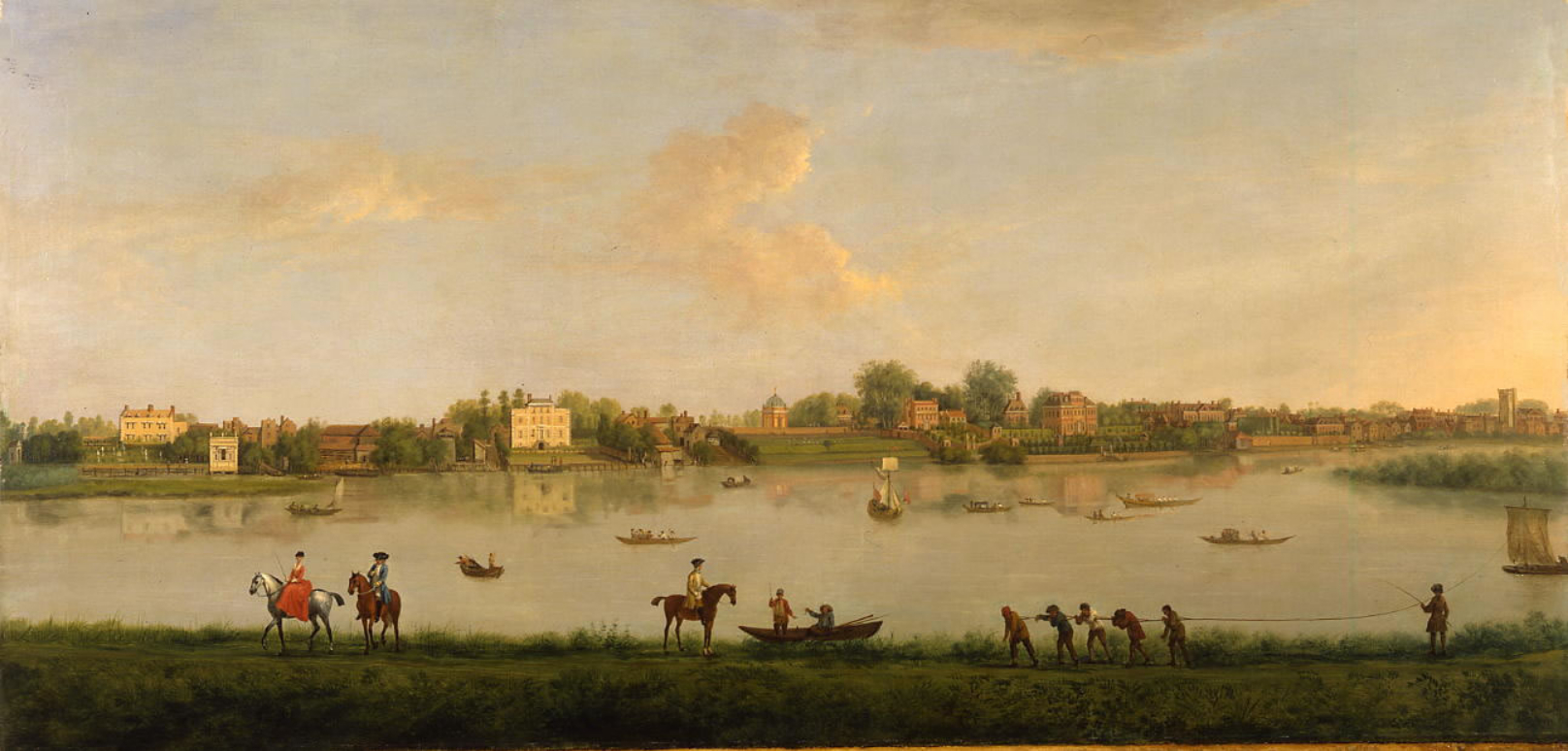
The Thames at Twickenham by Peter Tillemans, c.1724

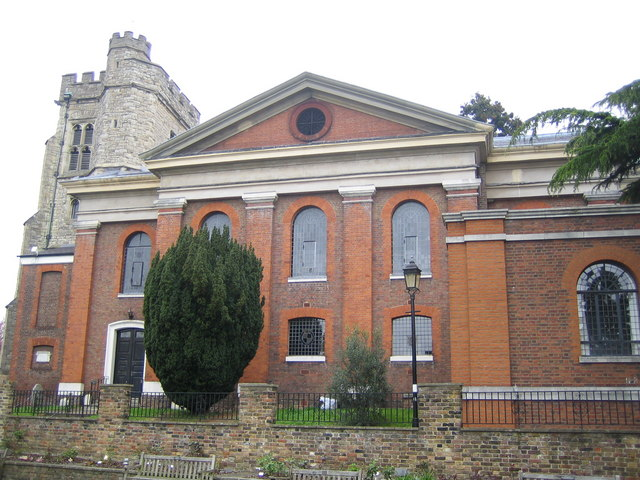
St Mary's Church today

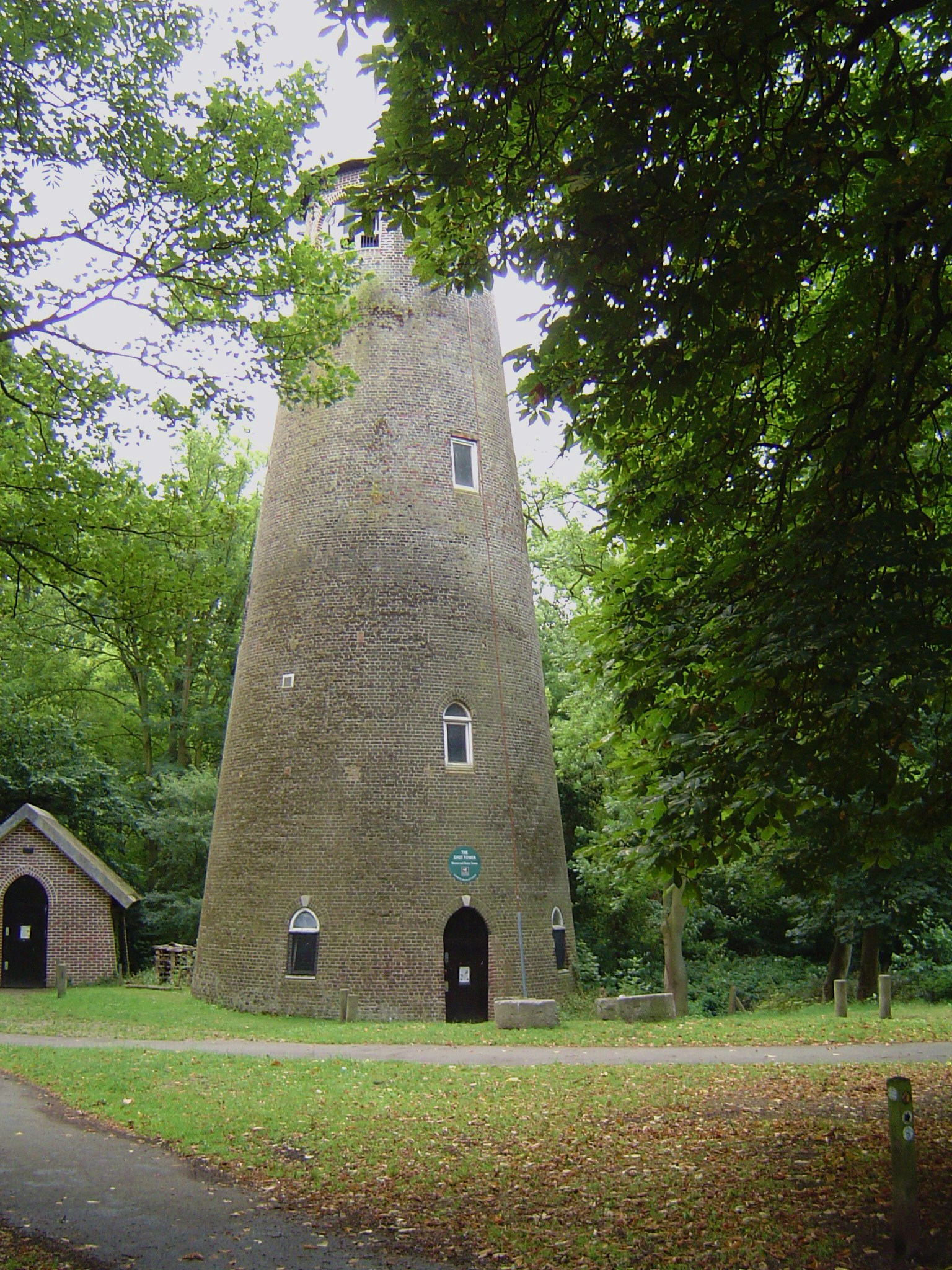
The Shot Tower by the River Crane

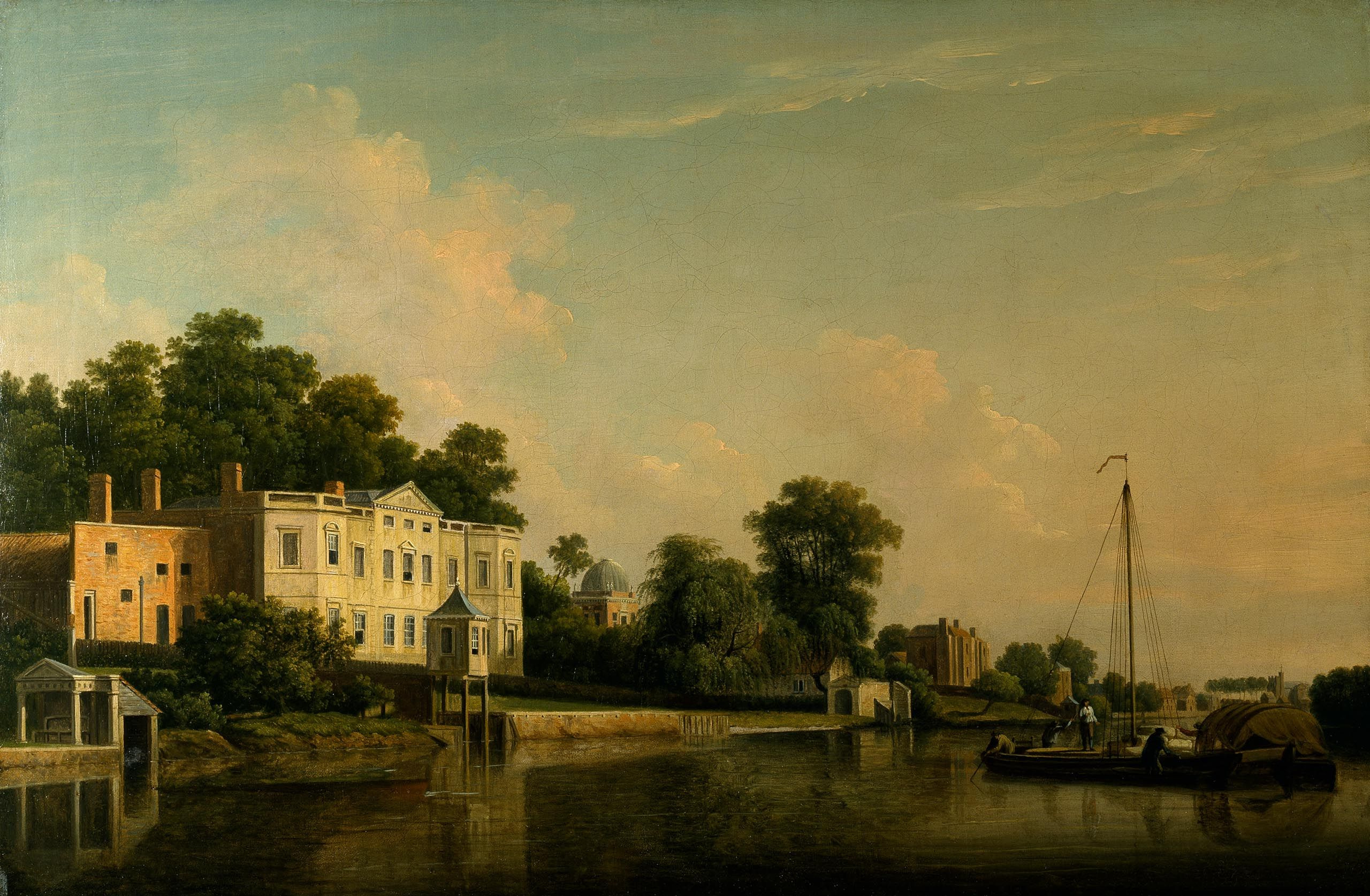
A View of Alexander Pope's Villa, Twickenham by Samuel Scott, c. 1759

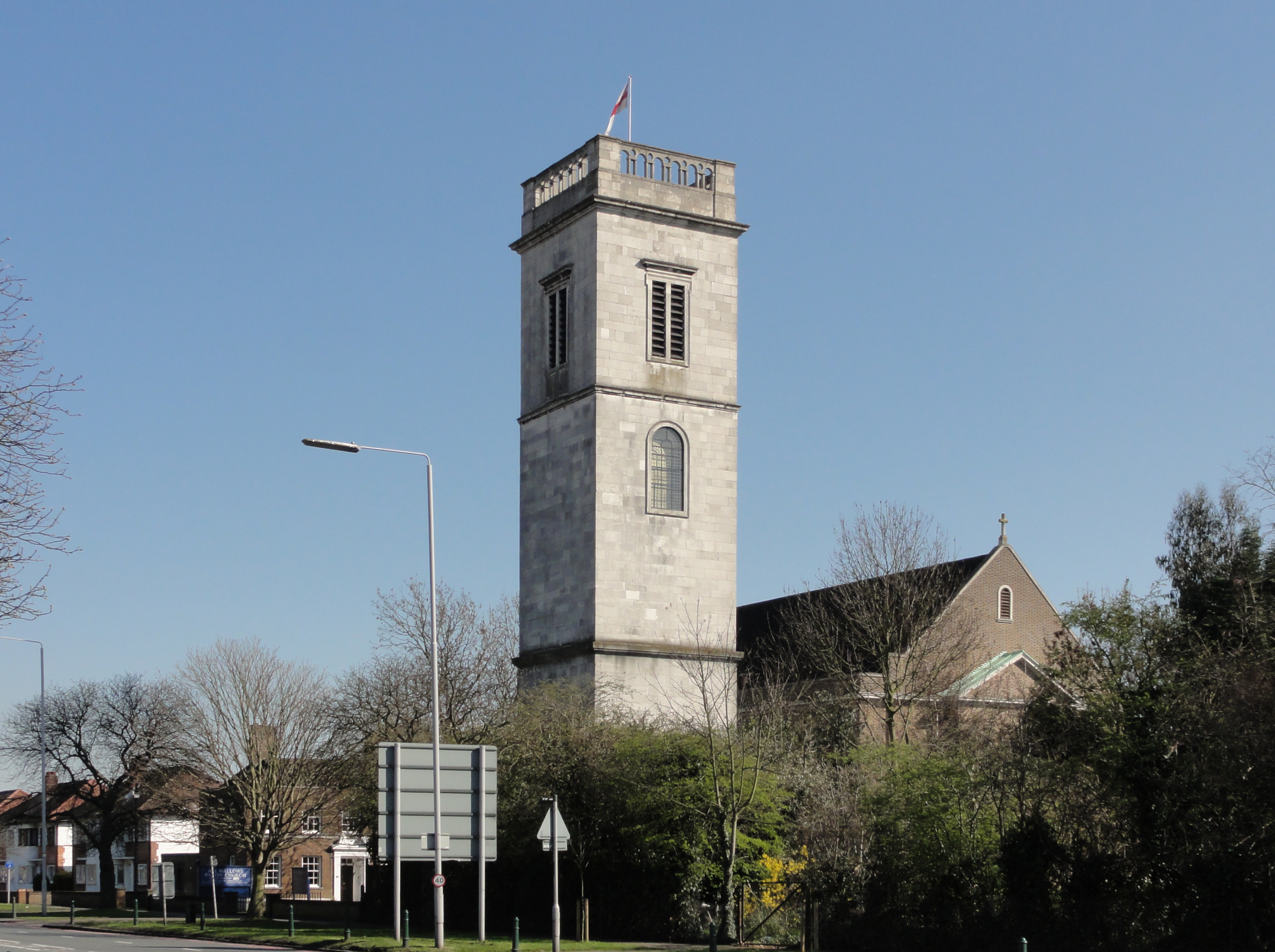
All Hallows Twickenham, as seen from the A316

Bubonic plague spread to the town in 1665 and 67 deaths were recorded. It appears that Twickenham had a pest house in the 17th century, although the location is not known.

There was also a watch house in the middle of the town, with stocks, a pillory and a whipping post whose owner was charged to "ward within and about this Parish and to keep all Beggars and Vagabonds that shall lye abide or lurk about the Towne and to give correction to such...".

In 1633 construction began on York House. It was occupied by Edward Montagu, 2nd Earl of Manchester in 1656 and later by Edward Hyde, 1st Earl of Clarendon.

=== 18th and 19th centuries ===
In 1713 the nave of the ancient St Mary's Church collapsed, and the church was rebuilt in the Neo-classical style to designs by a local architect, John James.

In 1736, the noted pharmacist and quack doctor Joshua Ward set up the Great Vitriol Works to produce sulphuric acid, using a process discovered in the seventeenth century by Johann Glauber in which sulphur is burned together with saltpetre (potassium nitrate), in the presence of steam. The process generates an extremely unpleasant smell, which caused objections from local residents. The area was also soon home to the world's first industrial production facility for gunpowder, on a site between Twickenham and Whitton on the banks of the River Crane. There were frequent explosions and loss of life. On 11 March 1758, one of two explosions was felt in Reading, Berkshire, and in April 1774 another explosion terrified people at church in Isleworth.

In 1772 three mills blew up, shattering glass and buildings in the neighbourhood. Horace Walpole, 4th Earl of Orford, wrote complaining to his friend and relative Henry Seymour Conway, then Lieutenant General of the Ordnance, that all the decorative painted glass had been blown out of his windows at Strawberry Hill.

The city of Huntsville, Alabama was first settled as Twickenham in 1805. In 1811 the name was changed to its present name of Huntsville. It was named after Twickenham, the home of founder LeRoy Pope's kinsman, Alexander Pope. The name is still used today as a neighborhood and a Historical District.

The powder mills remained in operation until 1927 when they were closed. Much of the site is now occupied by Crane Park, in which the old Shot Tower, mill sluices and blast embankments can still be seen. Much of the area along the river next to the Shot Tower is now a nature reserve.

The 1818 Enclosure Award led to the development of 182 acres (0.74 km^{2}) of land to the west of the town centre largely between the present day Staines and Hampton Roads, where new roads – Workhouse Road, Middle Road, 3rd, 2nd and 1st Common Roads (now First to Fifth Cross Roads respectively) – were laid out. During the 18th and 19th centuries, a number of fine houses were built and Twickenham became a popular place of residence for people of "fashion and distinction". Further development was stimulated by the opening of Twickenham station in 1848.

In 1898 some buildings on London Road, near the east end of King Street, were demolished, and a new road was built, in order to relieve congestion on the older Church Street. This new road was named York Street and opened on 1 March 1899.

=== 20th and 21st centuries ===
Electricity was introduced to Twickenham in 1902 and the first trams arrived the following year.

In 1939, when All Hallows Lombard Street was demolished in the City of London, its distinctive stone tower designed by Christopher Wren, with its peal of ten bells and connecting stone cloister, and the interior furnishings, including a Renatus Harris organ and a pulpit used by John Wesley, were brought to Twickenham to be incorporated in the new All Hallows Church on Chertsey Road (A316) near Twickenham Stadium.

There was a high-profile murder on 19 August 2004, when a French woman, Amelie Delagrange (aged 22), died in hospital after being found with a serious head injury (caused by battery) in the Twickenham Green area. Within 24 hours, police had established a link with the murder of Marsha McDonnell, who was killed in similar circumstances in nearby Hampton 18 months earlier. Levi Bellfield was found guilty of both murders on 25 February 2008 (as well as a further charge of attempted murder against 18-year-old Kate Sheedy) and sentenced to life imprisonment. In 2011 he was found guilty of the murder of Milly Dowler, a teenage girl who vanished from Walton-on-Thames in March 2002 and whose body was later found in Hampshire woodland.

== Governance ==
From 1888 the area was administered jointly between the newly formed Middlesex County Council and the Twickenham Local Government District board, which had been established with the passing of the Local Government Act 1858. Under the Local Government Act 1894 the area became Twickenham Urban District. In 1926 Twickenham was granted a charter of incorporation to become a municipal borough. Eleven years later the urban district councils of Teddington, Hampton and Hampton Wick merged with Twickenham.

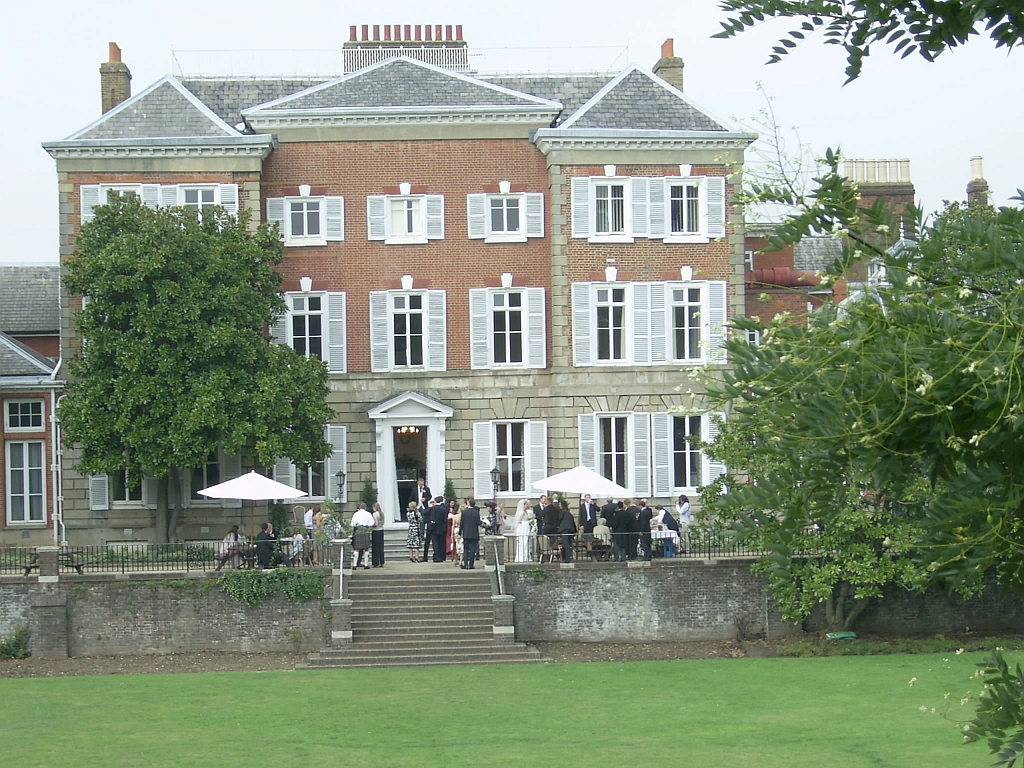
York House (rear view from sunken lawn)

In 1965 Middlesex County Council was abolished and replaced with the Greater London Council, and the boroughs of Twickenham, Richmond and Barnes were combined to form the London Borough of Richmond upon Thames. In 1986 the Greater London Council was abolished and most powers devolved to local boroughs and others to the Government and joint boards. In 2000 the Greater London Authority was set up and two-tier administration returned, but with the top tier having a much more limited strategic role.

The borough council offices and chamber are located at York House, Twickenham and in the adjacent civic centre.

The Twickenham constituency in the UK Parliament includes the towns of Twickenham, St Margarets, Whitton, Teddington, Hampton, Fulwell, Hampton Hill and Hampton Wick. Since the 2019 UK General Election, the member of parliament (MP) has been a Liberal Democrat, Munira Wilson.

Twickenham is part of the South Twickenham, St Margarets and North Twickenham, Twickenham Riverside and West Twickenham wards for elections to Richmond upon Thames London Borough Council.

== Economy ==
As Twickenham is a London suburb, many local residents commute to central London or work locally in retail, hospitality, education or for one of the many professional firms based in the area. London Heathrow Airport is important to the local economy both through direct employment and the cluster of international firms that have their European headquarters in the Thames Valley area. Unemployment in the area is very low, however there is a big difference in the salaries earned by residents who work inside the borough, compared to those whose employment is based outside.

The council has been making efforts to regenerate Twickenham town centre which has been struggling due to strong competition from Hounslow, Richmond and Kingston upon Thames. It differs from most town centres as it has fewer retail shops, particularly chain stores, and more cafes, restaurants, banks and estate agents. There has been a comprehensive scheme of town centre improvements including repaving in Yorkstone, a new arts centre, and improved gardens and riverside walk. However, plans to build a barge house for Gloriana at Orleans Gardens and to move the youth centre out of Heatham House so the building could be converted into a hotel proved controversial and were dropped.

== Population and housing ==
Data for 1891–1961 is available for the Urban Sanitary District, that was then the Metropolitan Borough which always included Whitton. This area temporarily expanded for 31 years to include Hampton and Teddington from 1935, rising from 2,421 acres (9.80 km^{2}) to 7,014 acres (28.38 km^{2}). The 2001 and 2011 censuses give detailed information about the town/district. The settlement's population in 2011 were living in 22,273 households.

Population of Twickenham
| Year | 1901 | 1911 | 1921 | 1931 |
|---|---|---|---|---|
| Population | 20,991 | 29,367 | 34,790 | 39,906 |

2011 Census homes
| Ward | Detached | Semi-detached | Terraced | Flats and apartments | Caravans/temporary/mobile homes/houseboats | Shared between households |
|---|---|---|---|---|---|---|
| South Twickenham | 254 | 987 | 1,459 | 1,302 | 32 | 13 |
| St Margarets and North Twickenham | 431 | 1,092 | 1,193 | 1,843 | 23 | 17 |
| Twickenham Riverside | 221 | 694 | 1,008 | 2,866 | 28 | 36 |
| West Twickenham | 148 | 1,300 | 1,770 | 1,052 | 0 | 10 |

2011 Census households
| Ward | Population | Households | % Owned outright | % Owned with a loan | Hectares |
|---|---|---|---|---|---|
| South Twickenham | 9,987 | 4,599 | 30 | 41 | 167 |
| St Margarets and North Twickenham | 11,172 | 4,616 | 28 | 40 | 197 |
| Twickenham Riverside | 10,396 | 4,280 | 25 | 32 | 175 |
| West Twickenham | 10,528 | 3,814 | 28 | 44 | 246 |

In terms of ethnicity (as of 2011 census), the majority of people in all four wards identified themselves as White British, ranging between 71% of the population in Twickenham Riverside to 78% in South Twickenham. The next largest ethnic groups in all four wards were Other White, White Irish and Indian.

== Geography ==
Twickenham is bounded by the River Thames on the south and the land is relatively flat though it does rise gently to the west as it approaches Whitton. The land is fertile and was home to numerous market gardens before housing became the predominant land use with the coming of the railways in the mid nineteenth century.

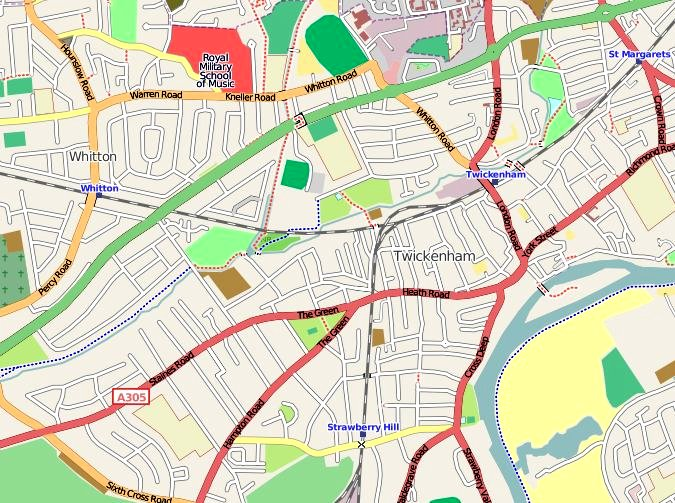
A map of most of the town of Twickenham

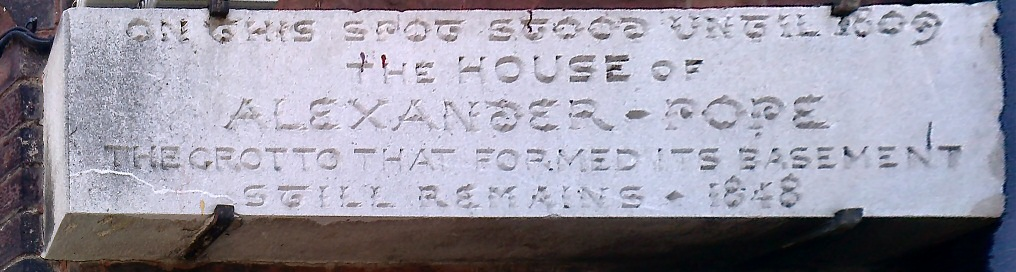
A memorial plaque to Pope's Grotto

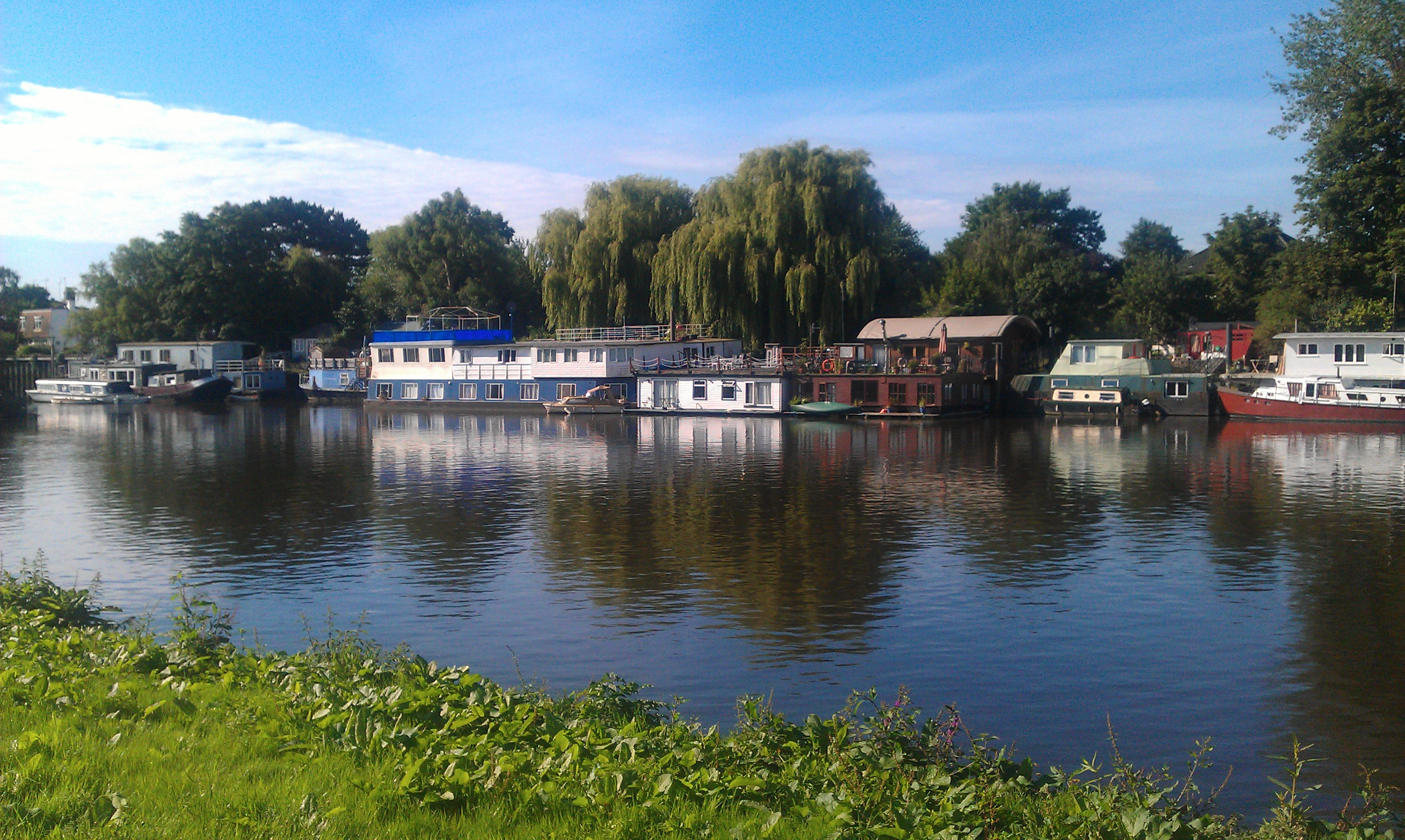
Houseboats on river Thames, in the St Margarets locality

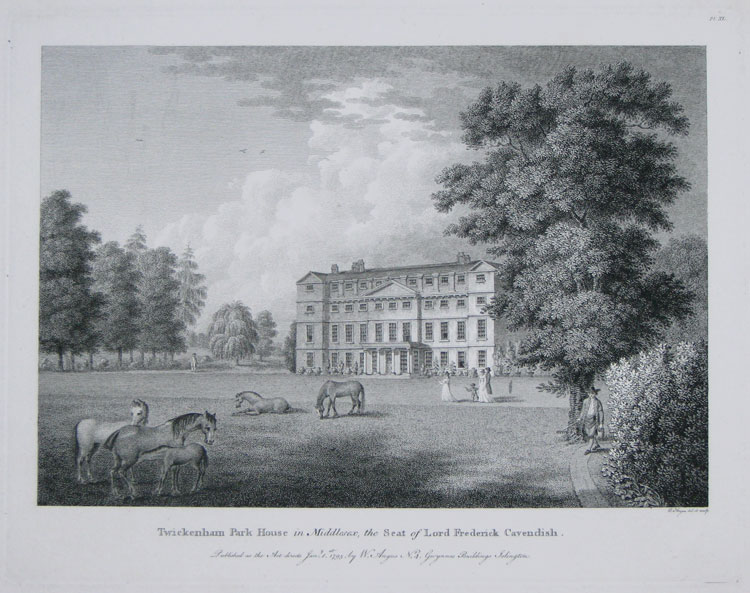
The former Twickenham Park House

The town is bordered on the south-eastern side by the River Thames and Eel Pie Island – which is connected to the Twickenham embankment by a narrow footbridge, the first of which was erected in 1957. Before this, access was by means of a hand-operated ferry that was hauled across using a chain on the riverbed. The land adjacent to the river, from Strawberry Hill in the south to Marble Hill Park in the north, is occupied by a mixture of luxury dwellings, formal gardens, public houses and a newly built park and leisure facility.

In the south, in Strawberry Hill, lies St Mary's University, historically specialising in sports studies, teacher training, religious studies, the humanities, drama studies and English literature. Strawberry Hill was originally a small cottage in two or three acres (8,000 or 12,000 m^{2}) of land by the River Thames. Horace Walpole, a son of the politician Robert Walpole, rented the cottage in 1747 and subsequently bought it and turned it into one of the incunabula of the Gothic revival. The university shares part of its campus with Walpole's Strawberry Hill. On adjacent land were the villa and garden of the poet Alexander Pope. The villa was demolished in 1808/09 following the orders of Lady Howe, who became irritated with the large number of tourists who visited the place.

A road just north of the campus is named Pope's Grove, and a local landmark next to the main road is the Alexander Pope Hotel (previously known as Pope's Grotto), a public house and hotel where Pope's landmark informal garden used to be. Near this hostelry lie St Catherine's school for girls and Radnor House School, in a building on the site of Pope's white stucco villa and the location of Pope's original – surviving – grotto.

There are a large number of fine houses in the area, many of them Victorian. The open space known as Radnor Gardens lies opposite Pope's Grotto.

Not far from Pope's Grotto is the Roman Catholic Church of Saint James, which has a memorial window in the form of the Royal Arms of Portugal and memorials to Manuel II, Portugal's last king, who worshipped here and died in nearby Fulwell Park in 1932.

Twickenham proper begins in the vicinity of Pope's Grotto, with generally large period houses to the west, the traditional definition of which is Twickenham Green, and similar housing in the east all the distance to Richmond Bridge typically largest near the Thames. The town centre is not actually in the centre of the town, rather in the south-eastern corner, as Twickenham was built up moving away from the Thames. Whitton lies further to the north and west.

The districts of East Twickenham and St Margarets lie to the north-east of central Twickenham on the west side of Richmond Bridge, the shortest bridge on the Tideway. These are popular for their attractive tree-lined residential roads and an eclectic range of shops and cafés. St Margarets is the location of Twickenham Studios, one of Greater London's major film studios.

East Twickenham abuts the River Thames at Richmond Bridge and St Margarets has its river frontage immediately to the north. The great estate of Cambridge Park, home of Richard Owen Cambridge, the 18th-century satirical poet, was located here.

=== Nearest places ===
- Fulwell
- Ham
- Hampton
- Hampton Hill
- Hampton Wick
- Hounslow
- Isleworth
- Kingston upon Thames
- Richmond
- St Margarets
- Teddington
- Whitton

== Education ==
Richmond upon Thames College

Twickenham has a university and several schools in Twickenham including secondary schools, primary schools and nurseries. Many of these are easily accessible by the local bus network mentioned in the Transport section. Richmond upon Thames College, a college of further and higher education, is on Egerton Road in Twickenham. St Mary's University, Twickenham has been located in Twickenham since moving from Hammersmith in 1925.

== Transport ==
Until 1971 London Transport operated a bus depot known as Twickenham garage (coded AB) on Cambridge Road, East Twickenham. The relevant destination blind for garage journeys always referred to this location as Richmond Bridge, which was close by. On closure, all its routes and vehicles were transferred to Fulwell bus garage, but the building remained under the ownership of London Transport until the mid-1990s when it was demolished to make way for a housing development.

Fulwell garage was originally the base for London United Tramways in south Middlesex. The trams were replaced by trolleybuses that started operating from Fulwell garage in the 1930s. The trolleybuses were later replaced by AEC Routemaster buses and Middlesex's last trolleybus terminated here on the night of 8 May 1962, following a commemorative circuit of the Fulwell routes by Middlesex's first trolleybus, No.1 of the A1 class Felthams, known as "Diddlers". This vehicle is preserved in working order.

Originally Twickenham railway station was situated on the western side of the A310 London Road bridge before the new station was opened on the eastern side. This accounts for roads named Railway Approach and Station Road, which now give no access to the station.

=== Nearest railway stations ===
The main railway station in the town is Twickenham itself, although St Margarets, Whitton, Fulwell and Strawberry Hill stations are also within the Twickenham post town. Stations in nearby towns (all, except for Richmond and Isleworth, once part of the former Borough of Twickenham) are:

- Hampton railway station
- Hampton Wick railway station
- Isleworth railway station
- Richmond station
- Teddington railway station

=== Buses ===
London Buses serving Twickenham are:

| Route | Start | End | Operator |
| 33 | Fulwell station | Castelnau | London United |
| 110 | Hounslow bus station | Hammersmith bus station | London United |
| 267 | Fulwell bus garage | Hammersmith bus station | London United |
| 281 | Hounslow bus station | Tolworth | London United |
| 290 | Twickenham | Staines | Transport UK London Bus |
| 481 | Kingston | West Middlesex University Hospital | Transport UK London Bus |
| 490 | Heathrow Terminal 5 | Richmond (Pools on the Park) | Transport UK London Bus |
| H22 | Hounslow | West Middlesex University Hospital | London United |
| R68 | Kew Retail Park | Hampton Court | Transport UK London Bus |
| R70 | Hampton | Richmond | Transport UK London Bus |
| N22 | Oxford Circus | Fulwell | London General |
| N33 | Fulwell station | Hammersmith bus station | London United |

All above routes serve King Street in the town centre apart from the 110 and the 481. The 481 runs through western Twickenham and the 110 runs through northern Twickenham. The N22 and the N33 only operate at night (00:00–05:00).

== Sport ==
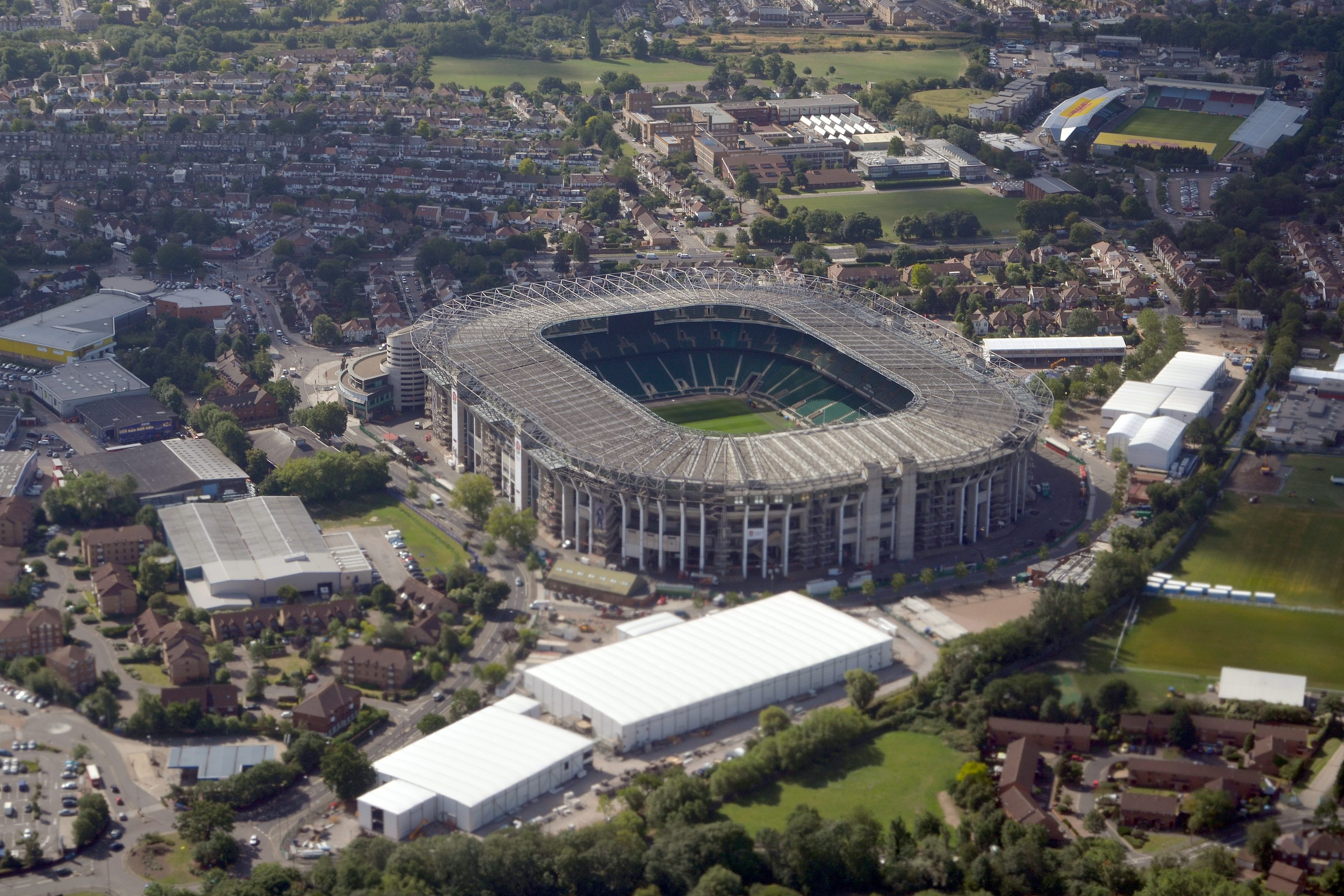
Aerial view of Twickenham Stadium.

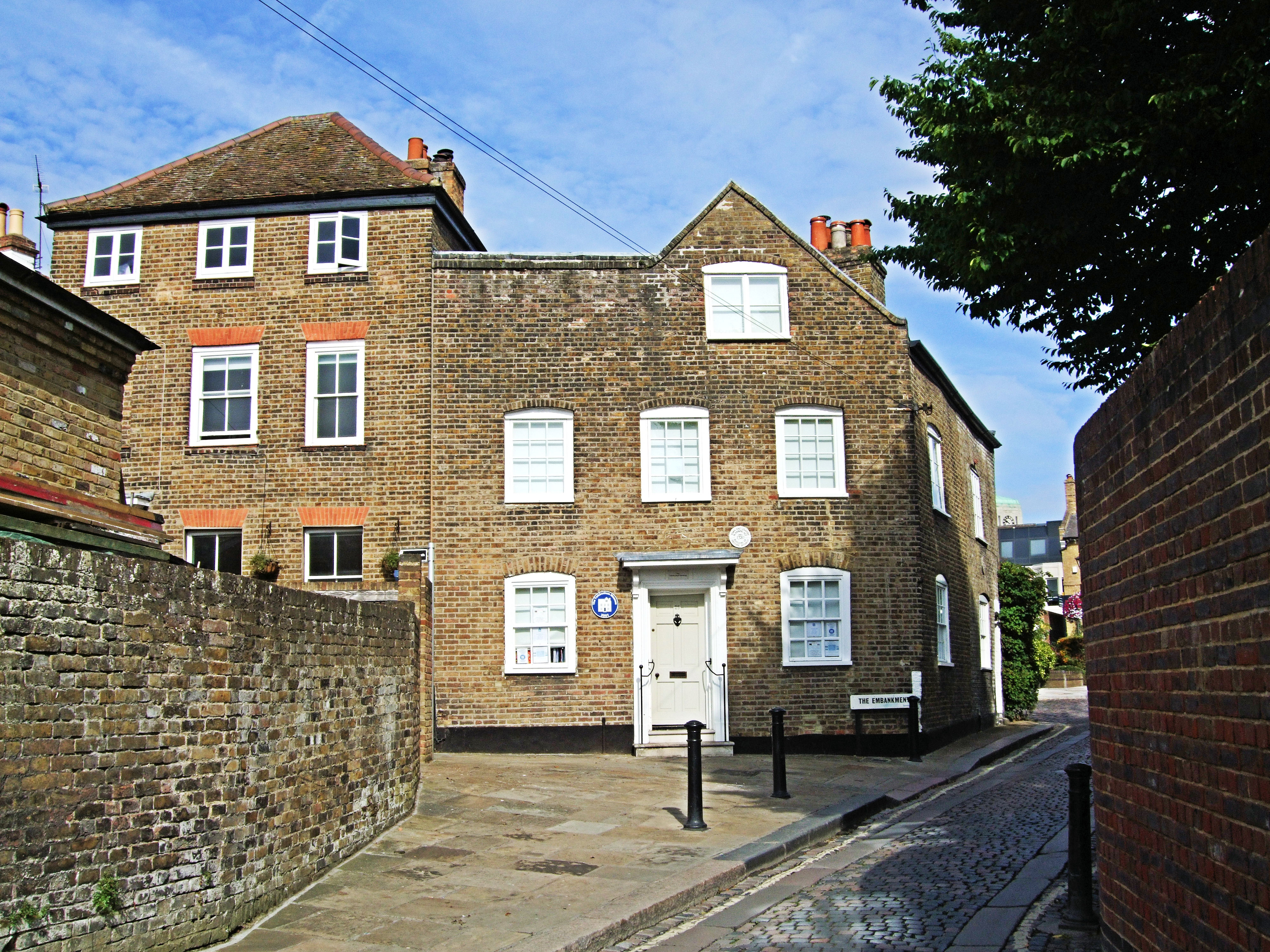
Twickenham Museum

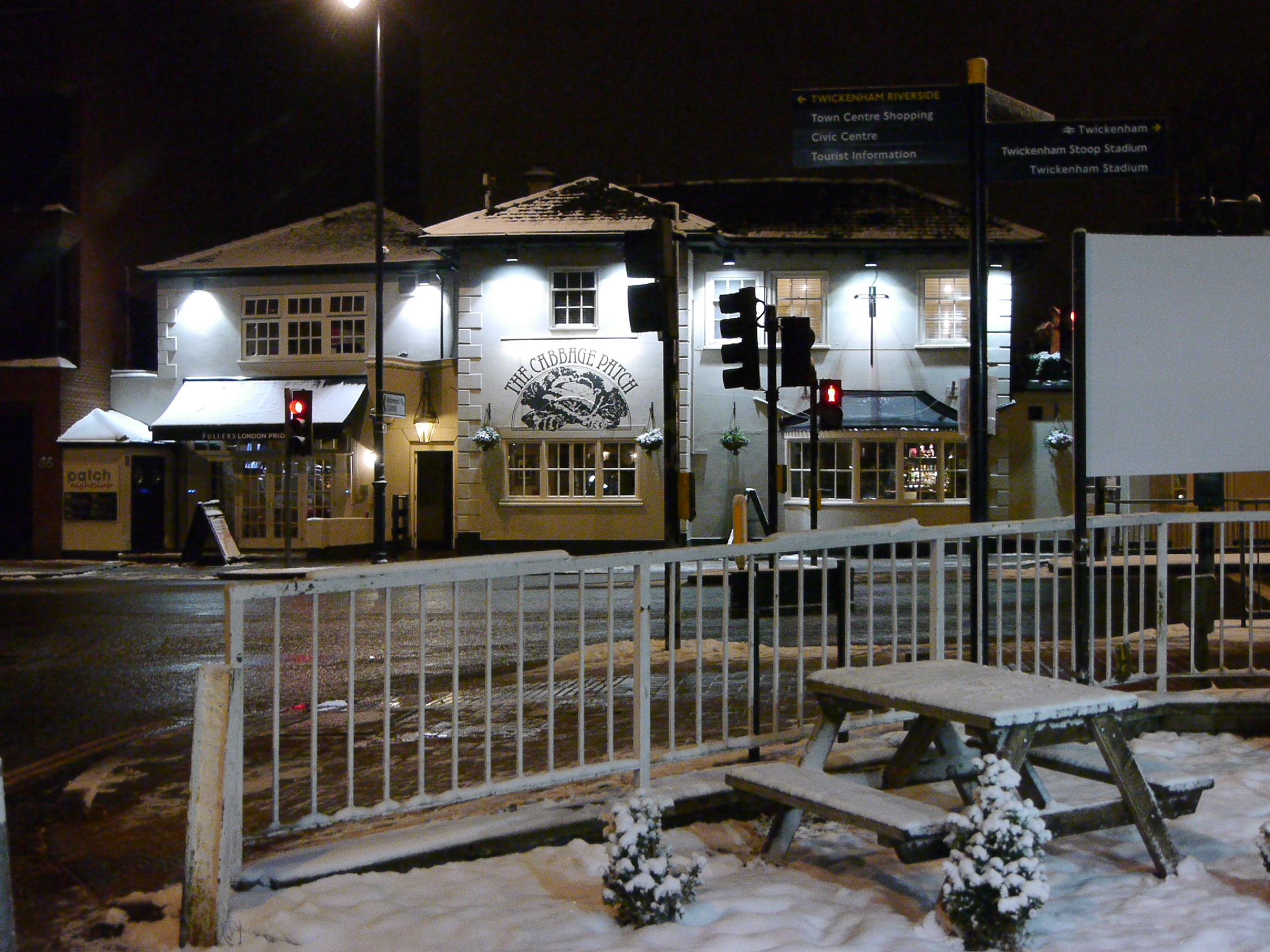
The Cabbage Patch pub in Twickenham

Twickenham is home to the headquarters of the Rugby Football Union and Twickenham Stadium. The England national rugby union team play all their home matches at Twickenham Stadium, which is England's second largest sports stadiums and the world's largest rugby union stadium. Harlequins, a rugby union club, play at the Twickenham Stoop. Twickenham Stadium hosted Rugby World Cup fixtures in 1991, 1999, 2015 and later including semi-final matches in 1999 and the final matches in 1991, 2015 and 2025.

== Arts and culture ==
The Exchange is a community building, including a 320-seat theatre, opposite Twickenham railway station. It opened in October 2017. The building is owned by Richmond upon Thames Council and is managed by St Mary's University, Twickenham.

The Twickenham Museum is a volunteer-run museum opposite St Mary's parish church. It is open every day except Mondays.

The Cabbage Patch pub on London Road has, since 1983, been a regular venue for live music on Sunday nights, organised by TwickFolk.

== Public art ==
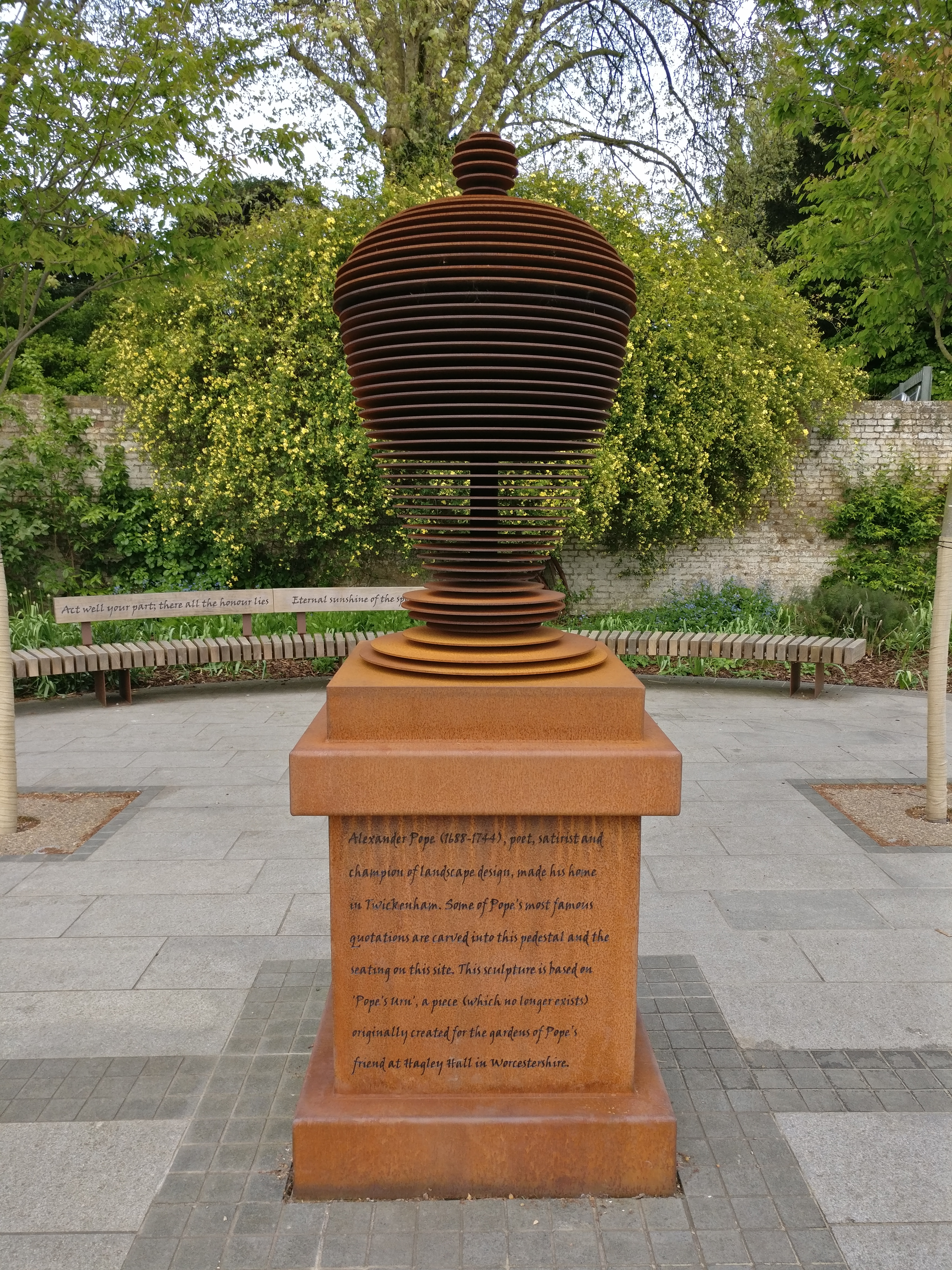
Pope's Urn on Twickenham riverside

In 2015, working in partnership with Richmond upon Thames Council and the architectural design practice Feilden Clegg Bradley Studios, Twickenham resident Graham Henderson conceived, designed, built and installed Pope's Urn, an important contemporary piece of public art, inspired by the poetry of Alexander Pope. Enjoying a central position on the Twickenham riverside, the sculpture was commissioned to celebrate the 2015 Rugby World Cup, and was opened in a ceremony in September 2015.

== Places of worship ==
=== Current ===
| Name | Denomination/Affiliation | Address | Website | Image |
|---|---|---|---|---|
| All Hallows | Church of England | 138 Chertsey Road, Twickenham TW1 1EW | website | |
| All Saints | Church of England | Campbell Road, Twickenham TW2 5BY | website | Church's interior |
| Amyand Park Chapel | Reformed Baptist | 174 Amyand Park Road, Twickenham TW1 3HY | website | |
| Free Grace Baptist | Grace Baptist | Powdermill Lane, Twickenham TW2 6EJ | website | |
| Holy Trinity | Church of England | 1 Vicarage Road, Twickenham TW2 5TS | website | |
| St James | Roman Catholic | 61 Pope's Grove, Twickenham TW1 4JZ | website | The church hall in Radnor Road |
| St Mary's | Church of England | Church Street, Twickenham TW1 3NJ | website | |
| St Stephen's | Church of England | Richmond Road, East Twickenham TW1 2PD | website | |
| Salvation Army, Twickenham | Salvation Army | May Road, Twickenham TW2 6QP | website | |
| Twickenham United Reformed | United Reformed Church | First Cross Road, Twickenham TW2 5QA | website | |

=== Former ===
| Name | Denomination/Affiliation | Address | Image |
|---|---|---|---|
| Twickenham Methodist | Methodist | Queen's Road, Twickenham TW1 4EN | |

== People ==
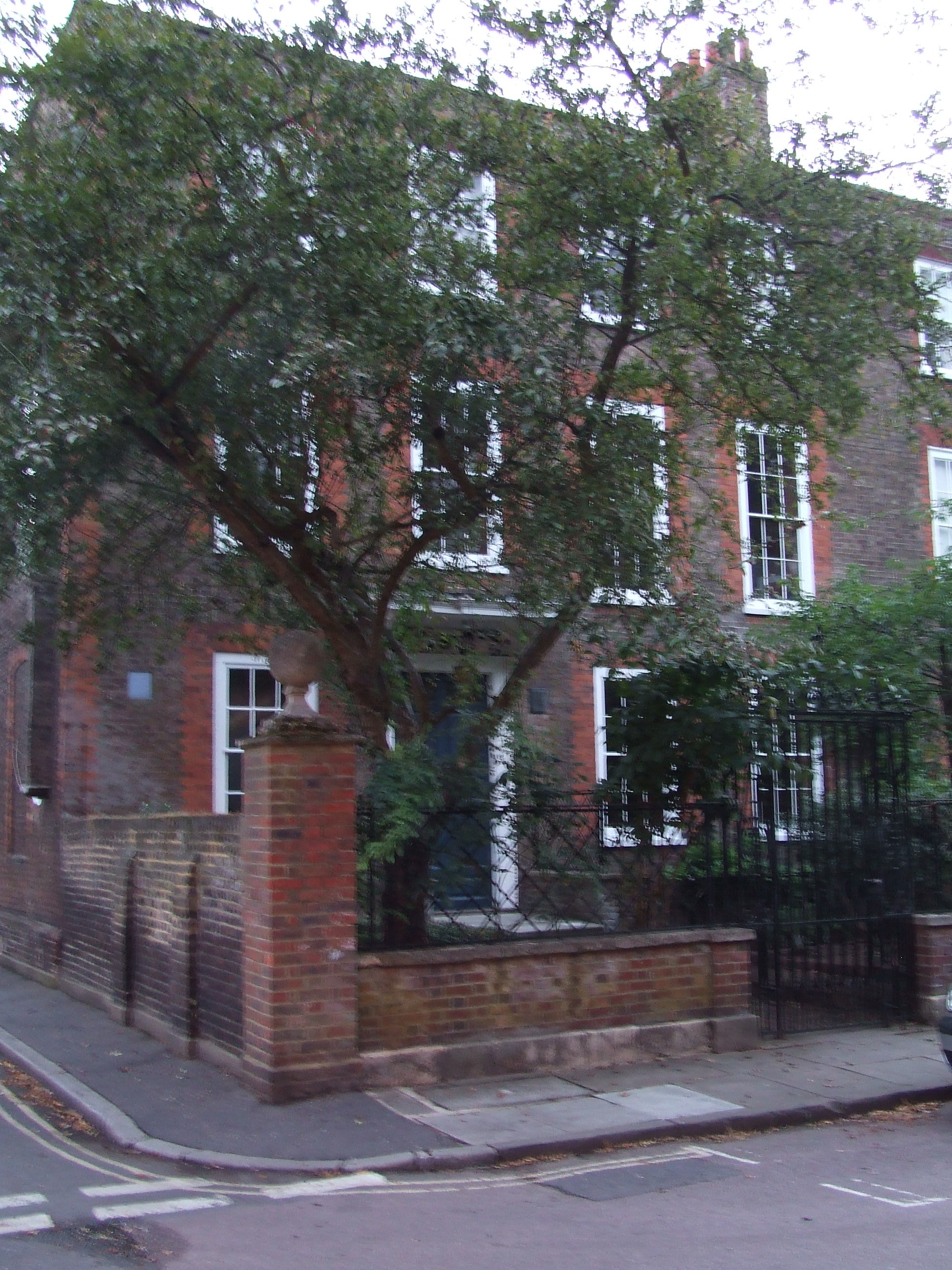
15 Montpelier Row's residents have included Alfred, Lord Tennyson and Pete Townshend

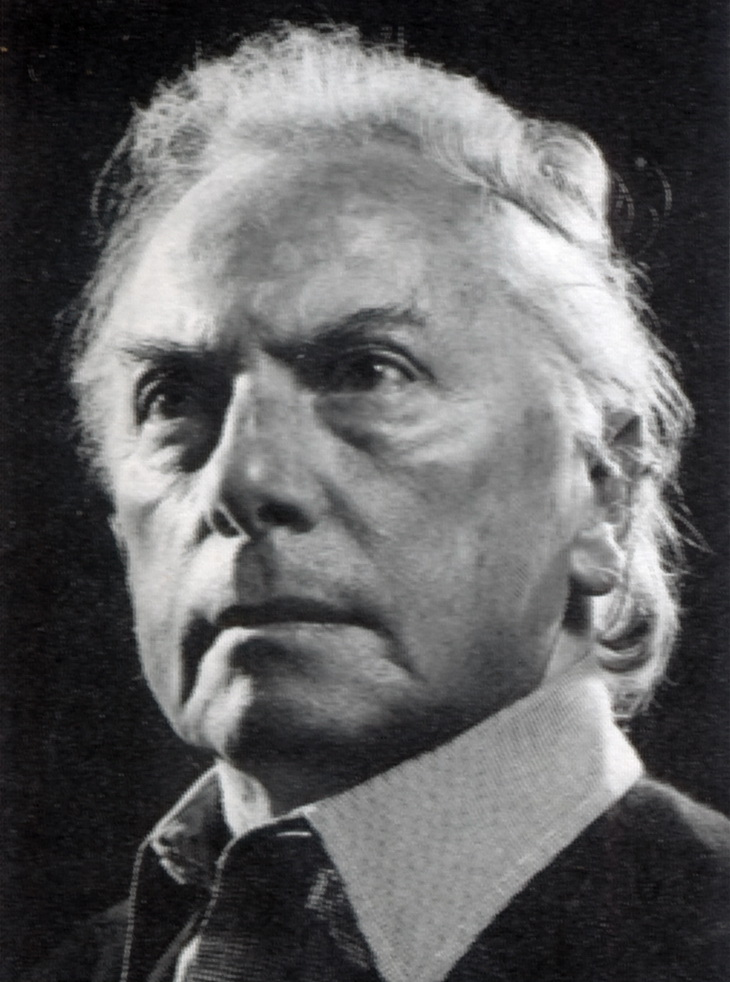
Andrzej Panufnik, who lived and died in a house on Twickenham Riverside

=== Living people ===
- Steve Allen, radio presenter, lives in Twickenham.
- Tony Blair, former UK Prime Minister, lived in a house in Twickenham in 1972, which he rented from a member of the Vineyard Church in Richmond, and used the Vineyard's crypt every Sunday for promotional events.
- Jason Bradbury, children's writer and TV presenter, lives in Twickenham.
- Rob Brydon, comedian, lives in Strawberry Hill.
- Michael Fish, television and radio weather forecaster, lives in Twickenham.
- Oliver Golding, former child actor and current LTA junior tennis player, has lived in Twickenham.
- Keeley Hawes, actress, and husband Matthew Macfadyen, actor, live in Twickenham.
- Graham Henderson, arts consultant and former Chief Executive of the Rimbaud and Verlaine Foundation, lives in Twickenham.
- Milton Jones, comedian, was born and brought up in Kew and now lives in Twickenham.
- Roxanna Panufnik, composer and musician, was brought up in the Panufnik family home at Riverside House in Twickenham overlooking the Thames.
- Tim Rowett, renowned toy collector and YouTube personality, lives in Twickenham.
- Pete Townshend, guitarist for The Who, who lived at The Wick on Richmond Hill from 1996 to 2021, previously lived at Chapel House, Twickenham, now called 15 Montpelier Row.

=== Historical figures ===
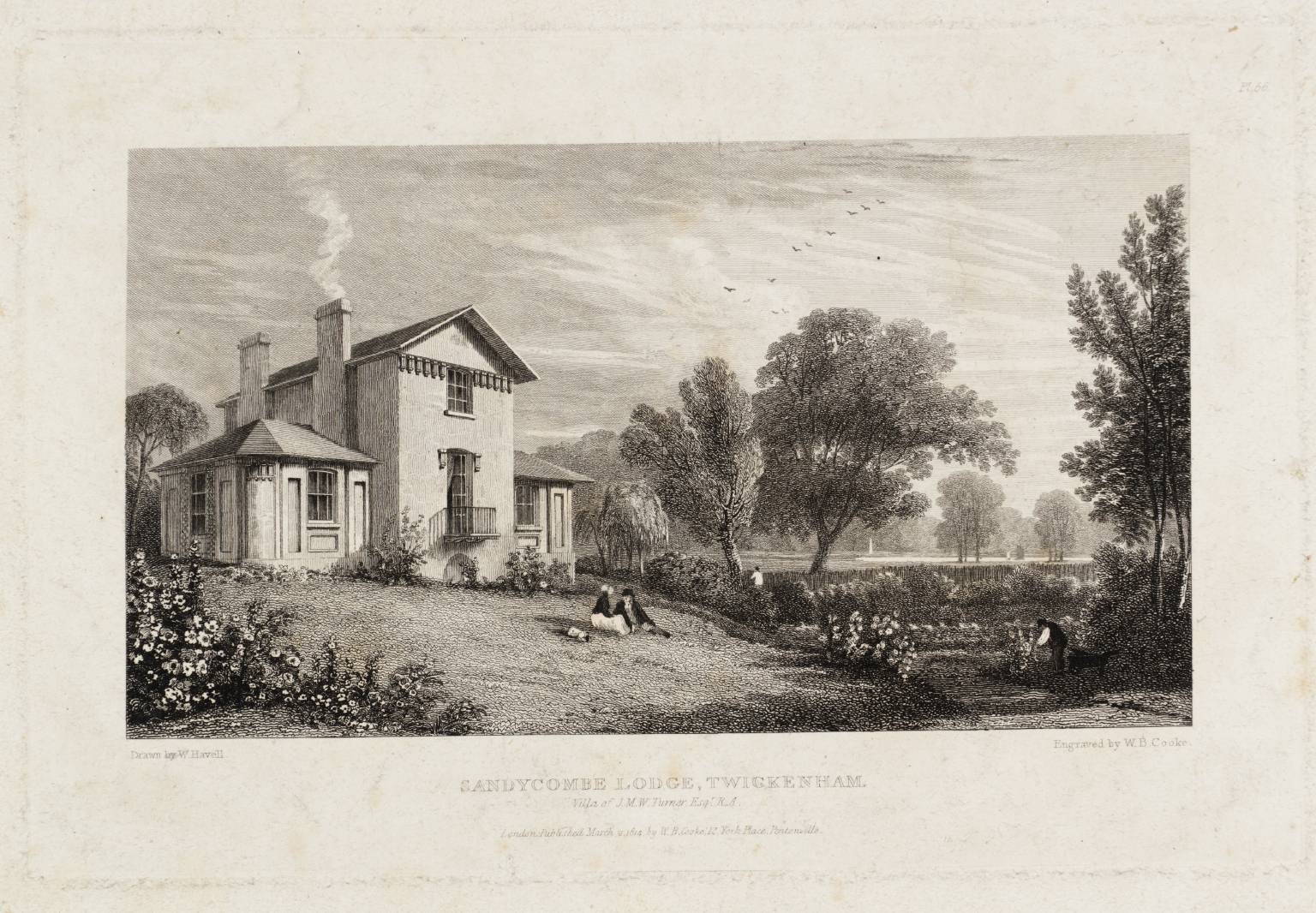
J. M. W. Turner's home, Sandycombe Lodge, in 1814

- Charles Ancliffe (1880–1952), Irish-born composer of light music, chiefly remembered for his "Nights of Gladness" waltz, lived at 5 Poulett Gardens, Twickenham from 1940 until his death.
- Brothers Arthur Anderson (1886–1967) and Gerard Anderson (1889–1914) were born in Twickenham and competed in track and field events in the 1912 Summer Olympics. Gerard was also the world record holder in the 440 metres hurdles. Gerard served as a second lieutenant in the Cheshire Regiment in the First World War. He was mentioned in dispatches and was killed in combat in 1914.
- Trevor Baylis (1937–2018), inventor of the clockwork radio, lived, worked and died on Eel Pie Island, Twickenham.
- Sigismund Payne Best (1885–1978), British Secret Intelligence Service agent during the First and Second World Wars, and famously captured during the Venlo incident by German intelligence in November 1939. He was raised at 26 Strawberry Hill Road, Twickenham.
- Richard Owen Cambridge (1717–1802), poet, lived at Cambridge House, Twickenham.
- Kitty Clive (1711–1785), actress, who retired in 1769 to a villa in Twickenham that had been a gift from her friend Horace Walpole, died there in 1785 and was buried at St Mary's. At the northeast corner of the church, there is a memorial to her on which a poem praises her generosity.
- Walter de la Mare (1873–1956), poet, lived at South End House in Montpelier Row from 1940 until his death.
- Melbourne Inman (1878–1951), professional billiards player, born in Twickenham.
- Henry Du Pre Labouchere (1831–1912), Liberal MP and journalist, lived at Pope's Villa, Cross Deep, Twickenham. The site is marked by a blue plaque.
- Katie Edith Gliddon (1883–1967), watercolour artist and militant suffragette, was born in Twickenham.
- William Goode (1907–1986), a colonial administrator and 1st Yang di-Pertuan Negara of Singapore, was born in Twickenham in 1907.
- Ron Greenwood (1921–2006), manager of West Ham United F.C. and the England national football team, lived in Twickenham early in his career.
- Harry Hampton (1870–1922) British Army sergeant who was the Victoria Cross, was born in Crown Terrace, Richmond and died in Twickenham. He is buried in Richmond Old Cemetery.
- Nellie Ionides (1883–1962) lived at Riverside House, Twickenham. A collector, connoisseur and philanthropist, she is best known for saving the 18th-century Octagon Room at Orleans House in Twickenham from destruction, and for donating this and also many pieces from her extensive art collection to the local council (now the London Borough of Richmond upon Thames).
- Norman Cyril Jackson (1919–1994), Royal Air Force (RAF) sergeant who earned the Victoria Cross, died in Hampton Hill and is buried in Twickenham Cemetery.
- Harriet Kendall (1857–1933), elocutionist, singer, pianist, poet and composer of ballads, lived at Elsinore, 8 Park Road, East Twickenham.
- Sir Godfrey Kneller, 1st Baronet (1646–1723), portrait painter, who lived in Whitton, was a churchwarden at St Mary's, Twickenham when its 14th-century nave collapsed in 1713 and he was active in the plans for the church's reconstruction by John James. Kneller's remains were interred in the church.
- Batty Langley (1696–1751), garden designer, was the son of a jobbing gardener in Twickenham and was baptised there.
- Charles Lightoller (1874–1952), the most senior officer to survive the Titanic sinking; in retirement from 1947 until his death in 1952, he lived at and managed Richmond Slipways in East Twickenham (No. 1, Duck's Walk), which built and maintained motor launches for the river police.
- The future Louis Philippe I, Duc d'Orleans, who was King of the French from 1830 to 1848, went into exile in 1793 and, before his return to France in 1815 on the fall of Napoleon, lived mostly in Twickenham. He and his two younger brothers lived in relative poverty from 1800 to 1807 at Highshot House, Crown Road; the house was demolished in 1927. From 1815 to 1817 Louis Philippe leased a house on the Twickenham riverside and gave it the name Orleans House. The house was demolished in 1926 but the octagon and some outbuildings survived and are now the Orleans House Gallery. After the 1848 revolution, many members of Louis Philippe's large family were forced into exile and took residences in the Richmond area.
- King Manuel II of Portugal (1889–1932) lived in exile at Fulwell Park, Twickenham, following the 5 October 1910 revolution in Portugal. He died in the house in 1932.
- Andrzej Panufnik (1914–1991), Polish-born composer, lived and died in a house on Twickenham Riverside.
- Alexander Pope (1688–1744), poet, lived in Twickenham. Pope was known as the Bard of Twickenham, or sometimes, on account of his acerbity, the Wasp of Twickenham. He lies in St Mary's, Twickenham under a stone slab engraved simply with the letter P, near a bronze memorial plate.
- Peter Sallis (1921–2017), actor, was born in Twickenham. He was the voice of Wallace in the Wallace and Gromit films.
- James Saunders (1925–2004), playwright, lived in East Twickenham.
- Sir Ratan Tata (1871–1918), a Parsee and a major industrialist in India, who bought York House, Twickenham in 1906 and lived there until 1914, when he returned to India. His widow Navajbai decided to sell the house and its contents in 1924.
- Alfred, Lord Tennyson (1809–1892), author and poet, lived at Chapel House, now 15 Montpelier Row from 1851 until 1853. His son Hallam Tennyson (1852–1928), second Governor-General of Australia, was born there and was christened at St Mary's, Twickenham in 1852.
- J. M. W. Turner (1775–1851), artist, designed and commissioned the building of Solus Lodge in Sandycoombe Road, on the border of East Twickenham and St Margarets. The house survives as Sandycombe Lodge. The site is marked by a blue plaque.
- Thomas Twining (1675–1741) was a merchant, and the founder of the tea company Twinings. In about 1722 he bought a property later known as Dial House, next door to the church of St Mary's, Twickenham, where he either rebuilt, or converted and extended, the buildings already there. The sundial on the façade carries the date 1726, possibly the time when the new building was finished. After Twining died in 1741, he was buried at St Mary's, where there is a memorial to him at the north-east corner of the church.
- Horace Walpole (1717–1797), art historian, man of letters, antiquarian and politician, built Strawberry Hill House in Twickenham and lived there.
- Paul Whitehead (1710–1774), poet and satirist, secretary to the infamous Hellfire Club, lived at Colne Lodge, Twickenham from about 1755.

== See also ==
- Twickenham Cemetery
- Twickenham Ferry
- Twickenham Golf Course
- Twickenham Museum
