= Free Grace Baptist Church, Twickenham =

Baptist church in Richmond, London, England

Coordinates: 51.4496°N 0.3786°W

Free Grace Baptist Church, Twickenham is a church that meets in a former Salvation Army hall at Powdermill Lane, Twickenham, TW2 6EJ in the London Borough of Richmond upon Thames. It was founded in 1965 and is a member of the Association of Grace Baptist Churches (South East).
