= All Hallows, Twickenham =

All Hallows Twickenham
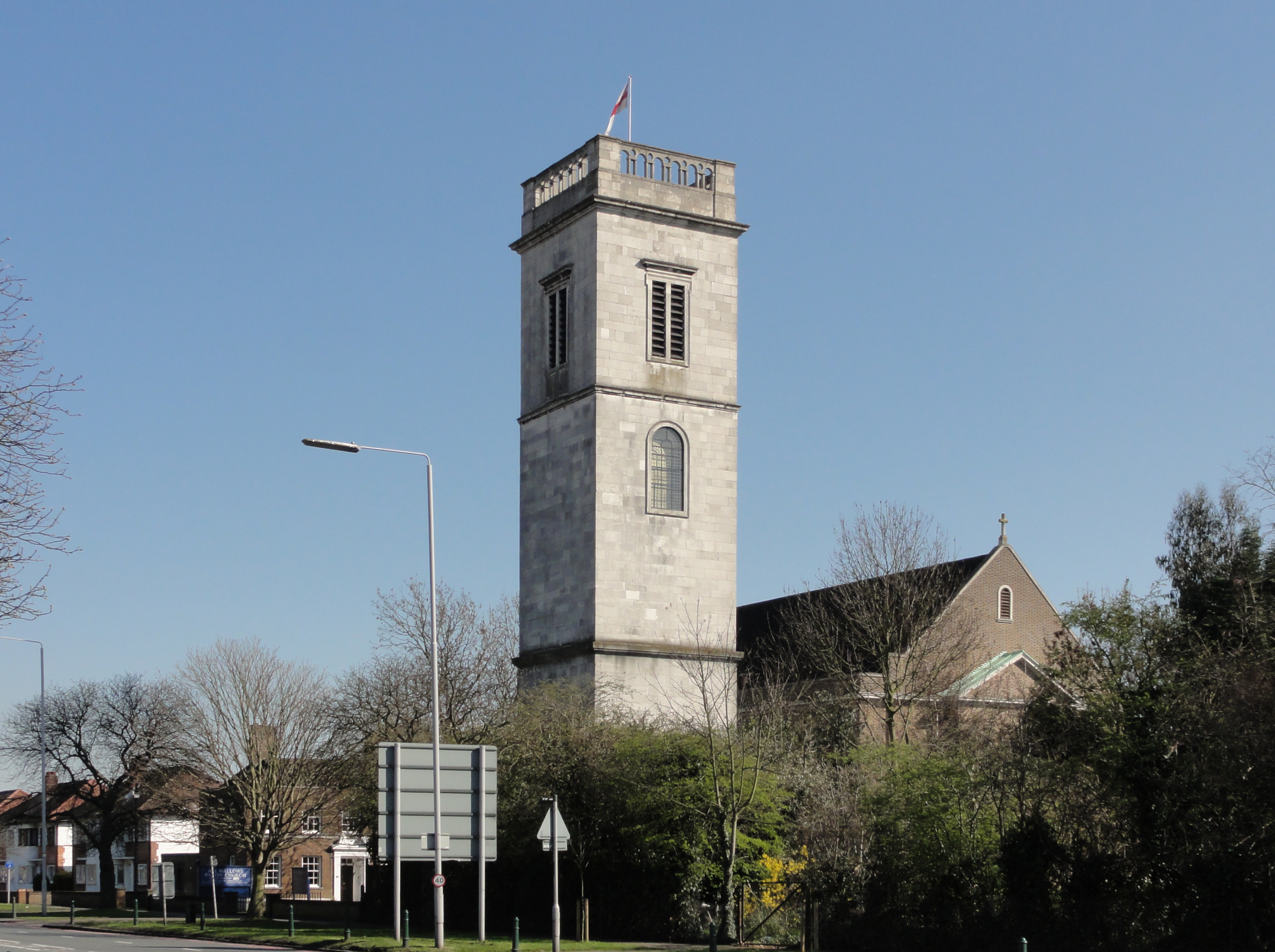
- All Hallows Twickenham, as seen from the A316.

- 51.4541674°N 0.3338385°W
- OS grid reference: TQ 15754 74169
- Location: Twickenham, London
- Country: England
- Denomination: Church of England
- Churchmanship: Liberal Catholic
- Website: www.allhallowstwick.org.uk

History
- Former name(s): All Hallows Lombard Street; St Martin's Mission Twickenham
- Dedication: All Hallows; St Martin of Tours (former)
- Consecrated: 9 November 1940

Architecture
- Heritage designation: Grade I
- Designated: 2 September 1952
- Architect(s): Robert Atkinson; Christopher Wren
- Style: modern
- Groundbreaking: 11 July 1939

Specifications
- Length: 35 m (114 ft 10 in)
- Width: 17 m (55 ft 9 in)
- Materials: brick, stone

Administration
- Province: Canterbury
- Diocese: London (Kensington Area)
- Archdeaconry: Middlesex
- Deanery: Hampton
- Parish: All Hallows Twickenham

Clergy
- Vicar: The Revd Kevin Bell

Listed Building – Grade I
- Official name: Church of All Hallows
- Designated: 2 September 1952
- Reference no.: 1080836

All Hallows Twickenham is a Grade I listed church and parish of the Church of England in Twickenham in the London Borough of Richmond upon Thames. It incorporates the tower of All Hallows Lombard Street and is prominently south of a major road of west London, near Twickenham Stadium, specifically the Chertsey Road (A316).

The church took many structures of Sir Christopher Wren's All Hallows Lombard Street in the City of London which was demolished in 1937; its stone square tower, bells, stone pillared cloister and many interior fittings and furnishings were moved to the site.

== History and description ==
Former mission

In community the church began as the continuation of St Martin's Mission Church, technically at first a chapel, which had stood for a few decades from 1914. Its building was at the south end of Whitton Road, beside Heatham House. It was demolished to host a beekeepers' association when the tower of Lombard Street was donated. St Martin's was a mission of the parish of St Mary the Virgin, Twickenham. In 1933, it gained its own priest in charge, Harold Schofield. Under his leadership the church gained its own parish and he was made vicar.

Foundation of the church at Chertsey Road

The new features of the church were designed by Robert Atkinson as a modern build based on Wren's uncompleted plans for All Hallows Lombard Street. The foundation stone was laid by the Bishop of London, Arthur Winnington-Ingram, on 11 July 1939, and the new church was consecrated on 9 November 1940 by his successor Geoffrey Fisher. During its consecration, air-raid precautions were in place and anti-aircraft gun fire could be heard in the distance, leading the Bishop to say, "churches are being destroyed by agencies more unnatural and vile than the Great Fire [which had all but destroyed a previous form of All Hallows Lombard Street]".

The main body of the church is a brick-built basilica with a narthex leading through the cloister to the old tower to the north, and to St Martin's Chapel to the south. The Christopher Wren-designed tower houses a peal of ten bells, including some of those that were originally hung at St Dionis Backchurch, then at Lombard Street. Inside the tower a massive oak gateway is preserved; it had been placed at the Lombard Street entrance to the old church after the Great Fire of London, and is decorated with skulls and crossbones.

Much of the church's carved woodwork resembles and is contemporary with the work of Grinling Gibbons, showing traces of his style. The great reredos is the best candidate for his work similar to his work at St Mary Abchurch. Its dimensions were included in Wren's plans, its carving original 17th-century work. The paintings are from its renovation in 1870. At the centre of the reredos is a carved, gilded pelican feeding her young from her own flesh (a traditional image of Christ who feeds his followers with himself in Communion). The main altar comes from the former local mission. The one from Lombard Street is in the Chapel at the south end of the narthex). Behind the choir stalls, which flank the chancel, are two wrought-iron sword rests for the ceremonial sword of the Lord Mayor of London. The wooden, carved, chalice-shaped pulpit with large sounding board comes from Lombard Street. The most famous regular preacher to have occupied it was John Wesley, who is recorded as preaching from it on 28 December 1789, and it is known to be where he preached his first ex tempore (off the cuff) sermon. The pews date from 1870. The baptismal font at the west doors comes from St Benet Gracechurch. Its marble base is decorated with carvings of cherubs, and its tall wooden cover is topped by the figure of Charity welcoming children. The church has an organ built by Renatus Harris in 1695, which is installed in the western gallery per Wren's plans for it, never before realised. Beneath are old churchwardens' box pews emblazoned with a lion/unicorn (the royal arms supporters).

== Activities ==
Services are held every Sunday at 8.30 (Book of Common Prayer), at 10.00 parish communion and at 11.30 (especially for families with small children). Services are occasionally held on Sunday evenings at 18.30 (evensong). Daily prayers are said morning and evening and there is a said Eucharist every Wednesday at 9.30.

The 1960s hall is used by the local community.

== Charitable status ==
The Parochial Church Council of All Hallows is registered as a charity with the Charity Commission.

== See also ==
- All Hallows Lombard Street
