= Salvation Army, Twickenham =

Church in Twickenham, London, England

Coordinates: 51.4453°N 0.3433°W

The Salvation Army, Twickenham is a Salvation Army church on May Road, Twickenham TW2 6QW in the London Borough of Richmond upon Thames. Its facilities include a community centre, part-funded by a housing association, Thames Valley Housing (TVH); the centre opened in 2014.
