= Amyand Park Chapel =

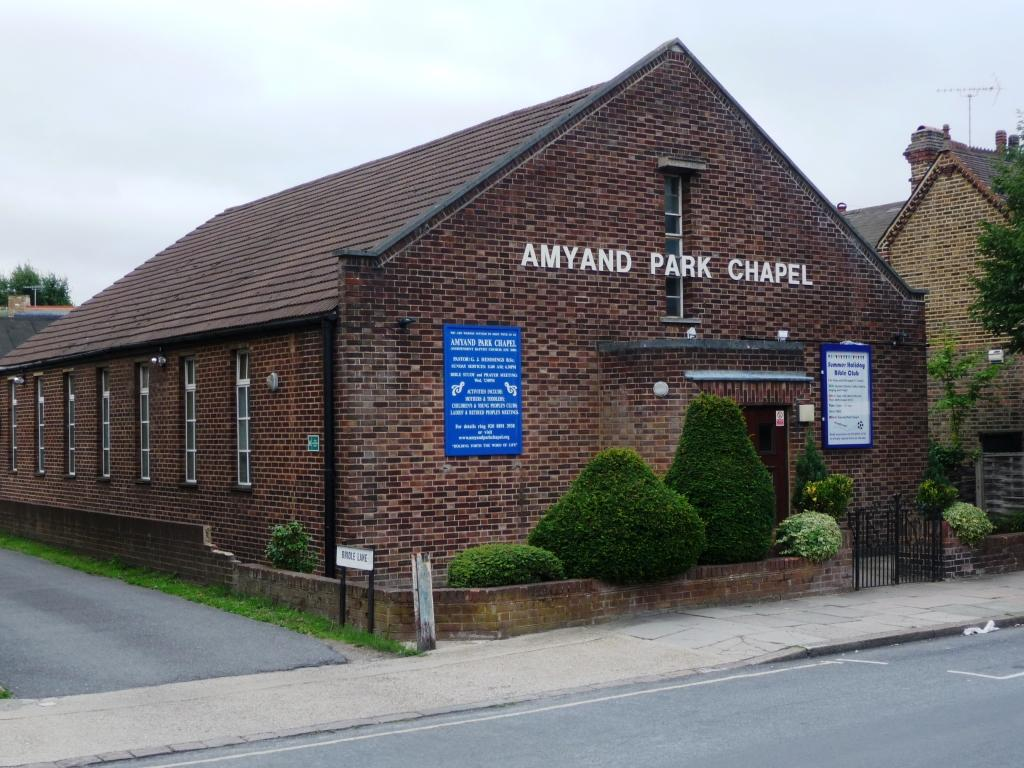
- Amyand Park Chapel
- Amyand Park Chapel
- 51°27′14.9″N 0°19′15.9″W
- Location: 174 Amyand Park Road, Twickenham TW1 3HY, London
- Country: England
- Denomination: Reformed Baptist
- Website: www.amyand.org.uk

History
- Founded: 18 October 1889

Architecture
- Years built: 1952

Clergy
- Pastor: Gerard Hemmings

Amyand Park Chapel is a Reformed Baptist church on Amyand Park Road in St Margarets, near Twickenham, in the London Borough of Richmond upon Thames. It is a Bible-preaching church, committed to the gospel, and has its heritage in reformation and Baptist teachings.

The church was founded on 18 October 1889, first meeting in an economical "iron church" structure. The current building was opened in 1952, with the Rev. Martyn Lloyd-Jones of Westminster Chapel preaching at its dedication service.

The church's ministry continues today in a number of ways, with weekly worship services and prayer meetings, Sunday school and children's clubs, and special events. Its current pastor is Gerard Hemmings.
