= Copnor =

Suburb of Portsmouth, Hampshire, England

Coordinates: 50°48′40″N 1°03′43″W

- Suburb
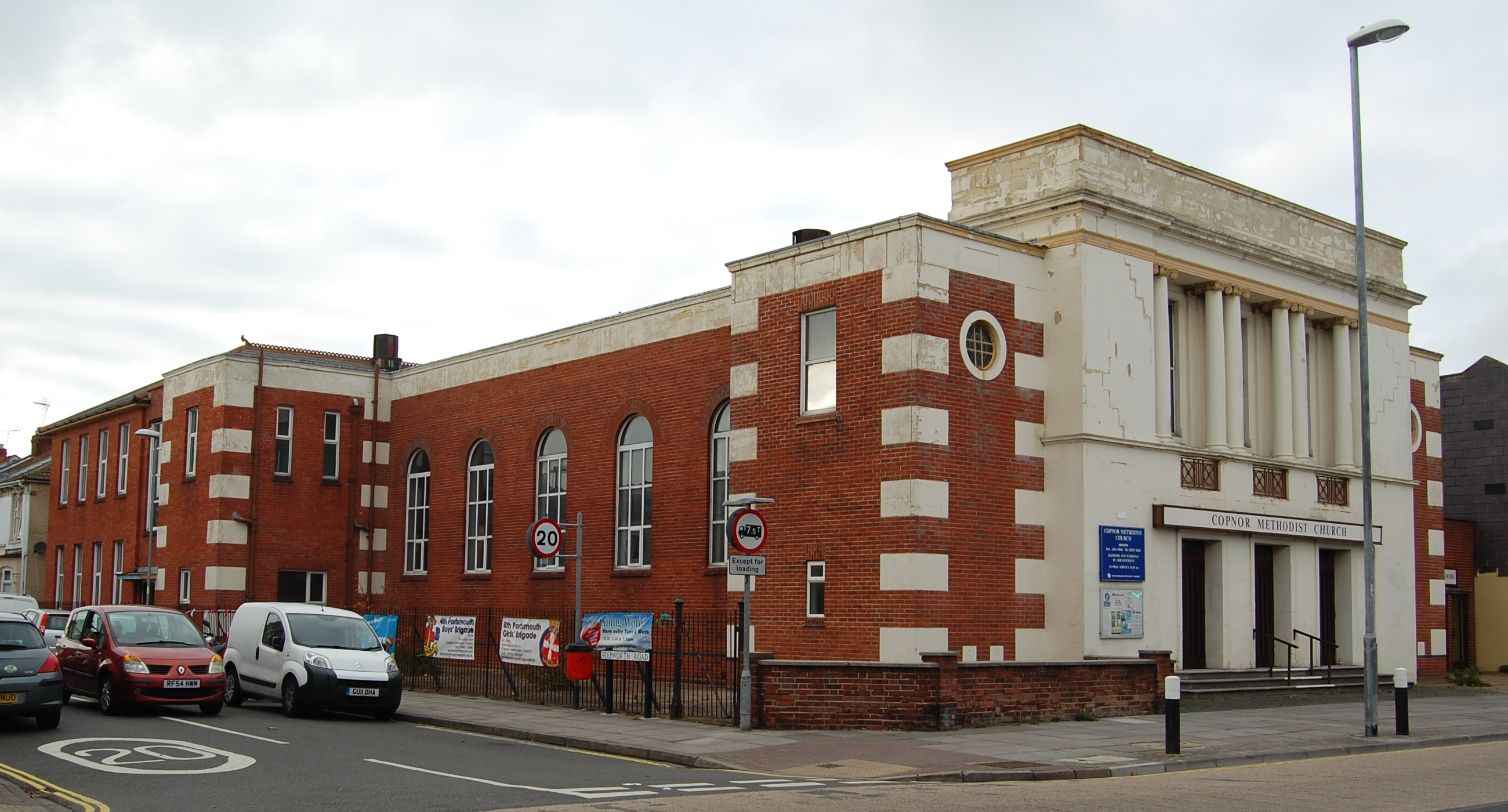
- Copnor Methodist Church

- Location within Hampshire
- Population: 13,608
- Unitary authority: Portsmouth
- Ceremonial county: Hampshire
- Region: South East
- Country: England
- Sovereign state: United Kingdom
- Post town: PORTSMOUTH
- Postcode district: PO3
- Dialling code: 023
- Police: Hampshire and Isle of Wight
- Fire: Hampshire and Isle of Wight
- Ambulance: South Central
- UK Parliament: Portsmouth North

Copnor is an area of Portsmouth, England, located on the eastern side of Portsea Island. The population of Copnor Ward at the 2011 Census was 13,608. As Copenore, it was one of the three villages listed as being on Portsea Island in the Domesday Book.

In the late 19th, early 20th century the rapid expansion of Portsmouth saw the original village engulfed. The west of the district is now a predominantly residential area of 1930s housing. The east of the district is an industrial and commercial area.

It was originally intended to have a railway station; an intermediate station between Havant and Portsmouth Town stations when the railway line opened. However, this never materialised, in spite of the large gap between stations, and the existence of a signalled level crossing for many years, replaced by a bridge in 1908. A road, "Station Road" was laid out, and still exists, however construction on the station never began.

Copnor's unbuilt railway station was also to have been the interchange station for the short-lived Southsea Railway (1885-1914), but the station was ultimately opened in 1885 at Fratton instead.

Portsmouth Airport was located in the north east of the district. After a number of accidents, the airport was closed in 1972. The land has subsequently been used for further commercial development and a housing development called Anchorage Park.

The area has been home to Admiral Lord Nelson School since the mid 1990s.

Not to be mistaken as a part of Hilsea, another Portsmouth district, Copnor Road passes through Hilsea as well as through Copnor itself. Copnor is one of the smaller districts of Portsmouth.

== Churches ==
St Alban's Church was built in the area from 1913 to 1914. It was damaged by bombs in 1940 and was repaired in the 1950s. It is home to a 15th century font originally from St Mary's Church, Portsea. St Cuthberts was built a year later. It was bomb damaged in 1941 and again repaired in the 1950s. A stained glass window to a design by Osmund Caine was added in 1953 with a further two, also by Caine, added in 1959.

The Roman Catholic church of St Joseph was built in the area between 1913 and 1914.

== Notable people ==
James Callaghan, who served as prime minister of the United Kingdom from 1976 until 1979 and was in parliament from 1945 until 1987, was born at 38 Funtington Road in Copnor on 27 March 1912. He lived there until around 1930, and at the time of his death in March 2005 was living in Ringmer, East Sussex.
