= Church of St James, Twickenham =

Church in London, England

- Roman Catholic Church of St James in Twickenham
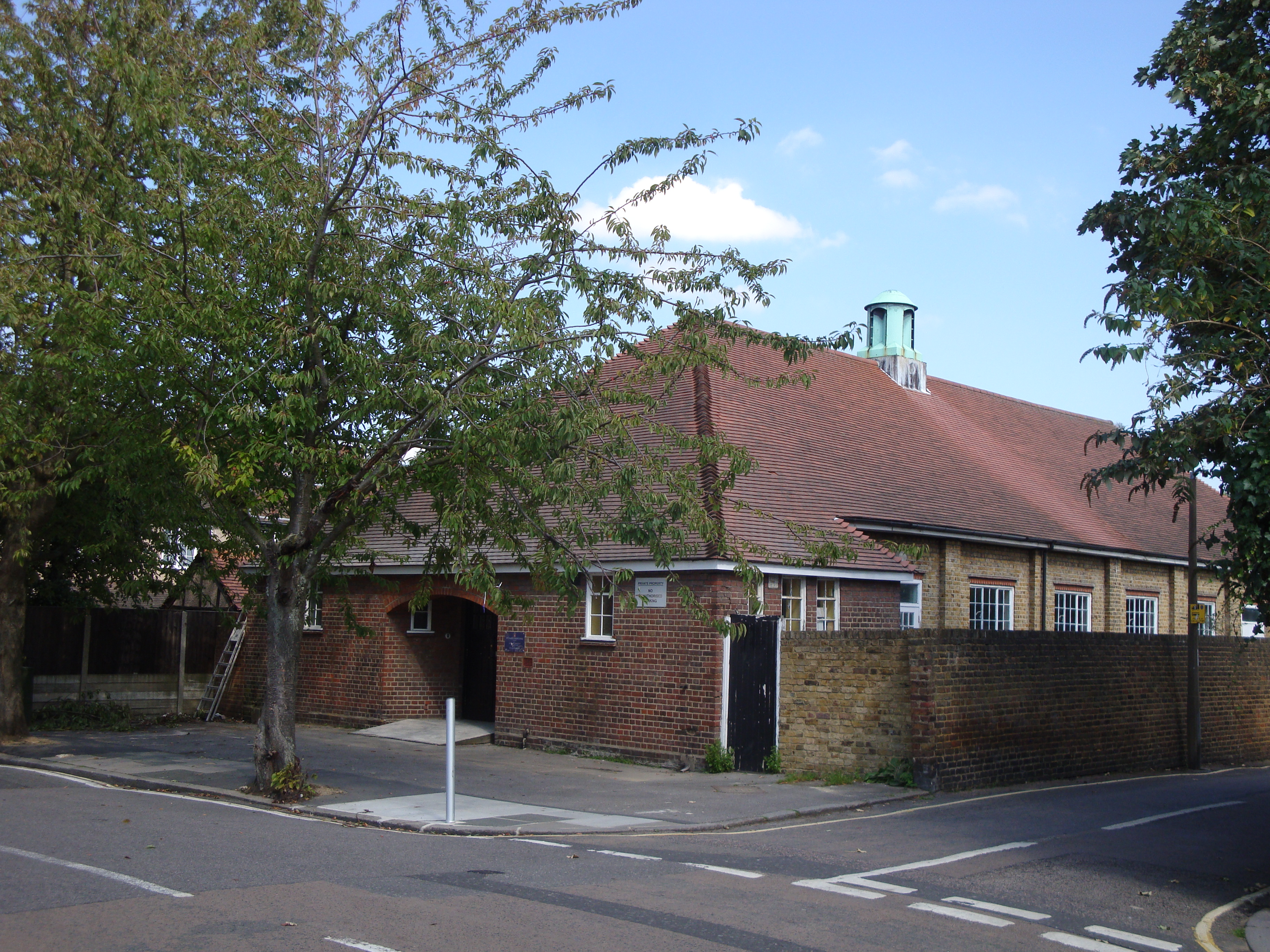
- The church hall in Radnor Road
- Church of St James, Twickenham
- 51°26′31.48″N 0°20′8.16″W
- Location: 61 Pope's Grove, Twickenham TW1 4JZ
- Country: England
- Denomination: Roman Catholic
- Website: stjamestwickenham.org.uk

History
- Founded: 1885
- Founder: Cardinal Henry Edward Manning
- Dedication: 25 July 1885

Architecture
- Architect(s): J S Hansom and Charles George Keogh
- Style: Gothic Revival
- Years built: 1885

Specifications
- Materials: London stock brick

Administration
- Diocese: Diocese of Westminster
- Deanery: Upper Thames

Clergy
- Priest: Ulick Loring

The Church of St James, Twickenham, is a Roman Catholic church at 61 Pope's Grove, Twickenham, in the London Borough of Richmond upon Thames. It is dedicated to St James the Apostle. It is a building of Townscape Merit. The church was opened in 1885 by Cardinal Henry Edward Manning and consecrated by the Cardinal in 1887. For a few years before then Roman Catholic mass was celebrated in a mass centre in Grosvenor Road in the centre of Twickenham.

Alexander Pope, the Catholic satirist and poet, lived in Pope's Villa a short distance away in Cross Deep from 1718 until his death in 1744. He gave his name to Pope's Grotto which now links St Catherine's School and Radnor House school under Cross Deep.

The church has been described as "a relatively modest Gothic Revival building which takes its cues from thirteenth century architecture". It was paid for by James de Lacey Towle, hence its dedication to St James. The paintings in the church include a copy of a Raphael of the Madonna and child donated by Sir Mountstuart Grant Duff in about 1900, and a representation of St James 'Matamoros' (conqueror of the Moors) executed by Vicente de Arroyabe in 1995, and donated by a parishioner, Mrs Evelyn Dunning. In a side entrance on the west side of the church there is a painting of the church by Dutch born writer and artist, the late Hilda van Stockum.

The fleur de lys carvings on the ceiling above the sanctuary bear witness to the support given to the parish by the French Royal Family who lived in the locality for several decades. The side altar dedicated to the apparition of the Sacred Heart to St Margaret Mary Alacoque also illustrate the church's association with France. Princess Marie-Amelie of Bourbon-Orleans was born in York House (now used by the London Borough of Richmond) in 1865. She married King Carlos of Portugal and gave birth to King Manuel II, who became an important benefactor of the parish after he settled in Twickenham following his exile from Portugal in 1910.

== Portuguese affiliations ==
King Manuel II of Portugal who lived in Fulwell Park, was a prominent parishioner, regularly attending mass, and was active in local affairs. During the First World War he supported the Allied cause and the entry of Portugal into the war. He was engaged in various activities to alleviate the suffering caused by the war. He and his wife Queen Victoria Augusta were godparents to many children at their Confirmation at St James's. Two windows at the front of the church were donated by King Manuel. One is dedicated to St Anthony, Patron Saint of Lisbon, and bears the royal crest in the bottom left hand corner. The other is dedicated to St Edmund of Abingdon, Archbishop of Canterbury from 1233 to 1240. This window was installed in memory of Canon Edmund English who died in 1924. King Manuel also opened the Parish Hall in Radnor Road in December 1927.

After the King's death in 1932, the parish acquired various sacred vessels including silver cruets, a ciborium embossed with the King's monogram and a baptismal shell. Queen Victoria Augusta also gave the parish the organ, which the King had played in his house. The organ became unusable in the 1990s and had to be partially dismantled. The main pipes and the upper woodwork bearing the Portuguese royal arms can still be seen in the old choir loft.

In 2009, the Portuguese connection was renewed when a memorial to King Manuel II and Queen Augusta Victoria was installed on the right-hand side of the Sanctuary. It was unveiled by Councillor Celia Hodges, the Mayor of Richmond upon Thames, and dedicated by George Stack, then Auxiliary Bishop of Westminster. HRH Dom Miguel of Portugal, a kinsman of the late King, and the then Portuguese Ambassador Antonio Santana Carlos laid a wreath in memory of the Portuguese dead of the First World War.

== New appeal ==
With the support of the Anglo-Portuguese Society, other members of the Anglo-Portuguese community, and the patronage of HRH Dom Miguel of Braganza, Duke of Viseu, a project was launched to install stained glass windows to honour of the Portuguese dead of the First World War and the humanitarian work of King Manuel while in exile. The church was redecorated at this time and the two new glass windows were commissioned. Designed by the late Caroline Benyon, they were blessed and dedicated on 9 April 2018. The ceremony was carried out by Field Marshal Lord Guthrie of Craigiebank and HE Manuel Lobo Antunes, Ambassador of Portugal. Bishop John Wilson, Auxiliary of Westminster performed the blessing and celebrated mass. The music was executed by the Portuguese choir of Camden Town, and by the parish choir. Local reservists provided a guard of honour. In May 2018, a Portuguese Parliamentary Delegation visited the church, and presented the parish of a commemorative dish of the new Portuguese Constitution of 1976.On the first anniversary of the installation of the windows an official commemorative plaque was unveiled by the Ambassador of Portugal.

There were once plans to erect a statue of King Manuel II in Radnor Gardens, on the banks of the river Thames, in recognition of his significant contribution to St James' Parish and Church, to the war effort and to his care for war victims.

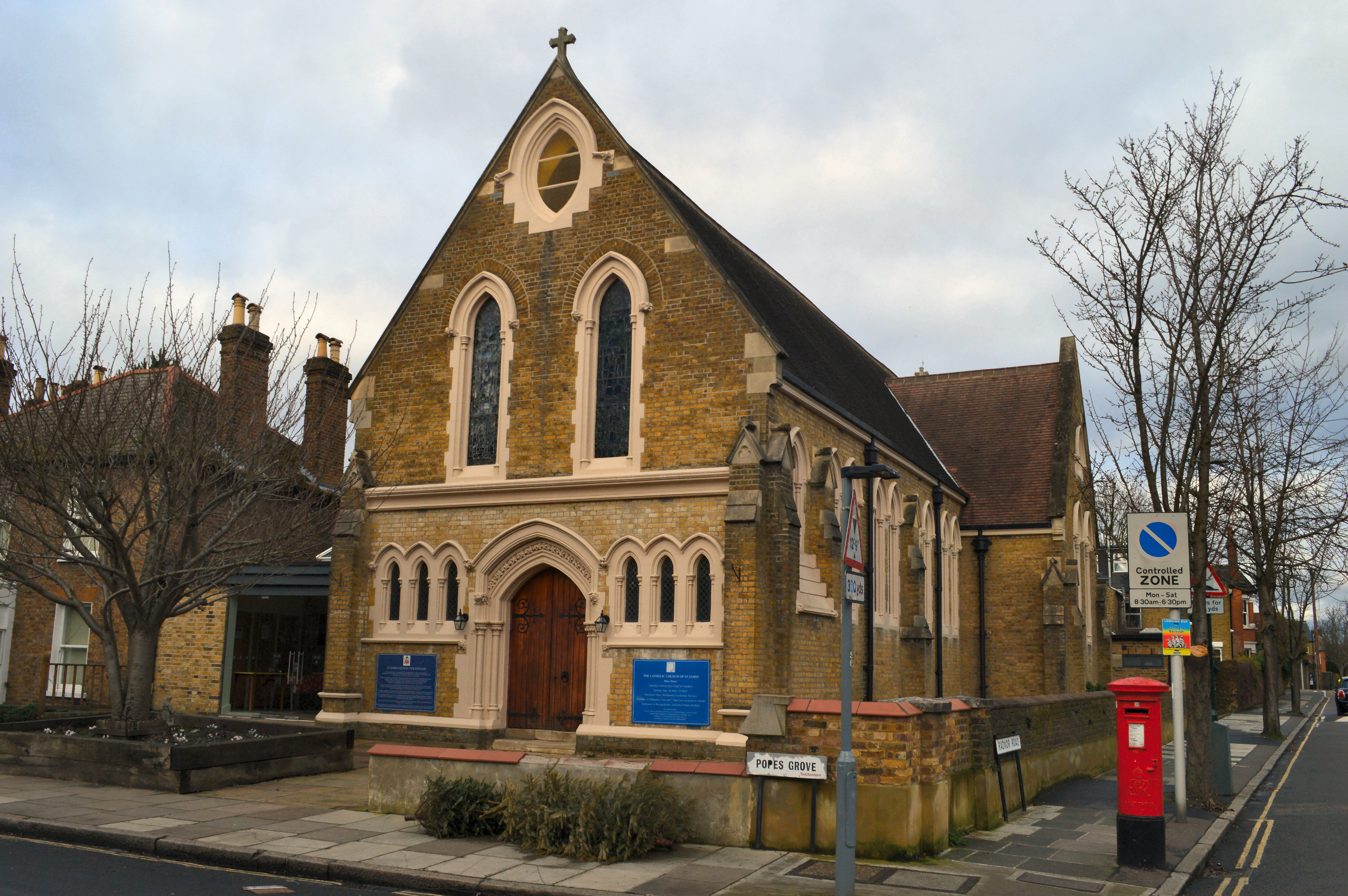
Church of St James

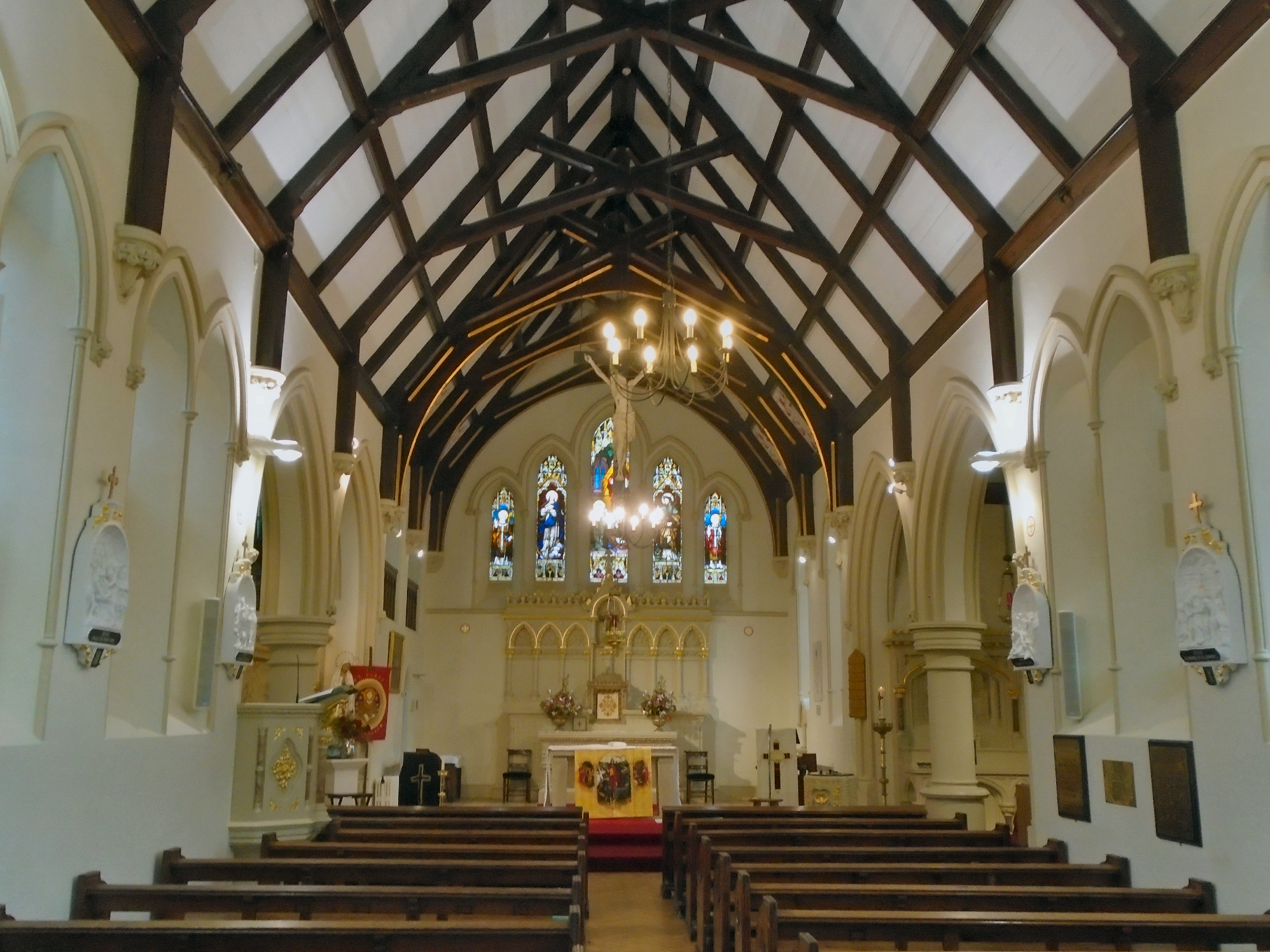
Interior

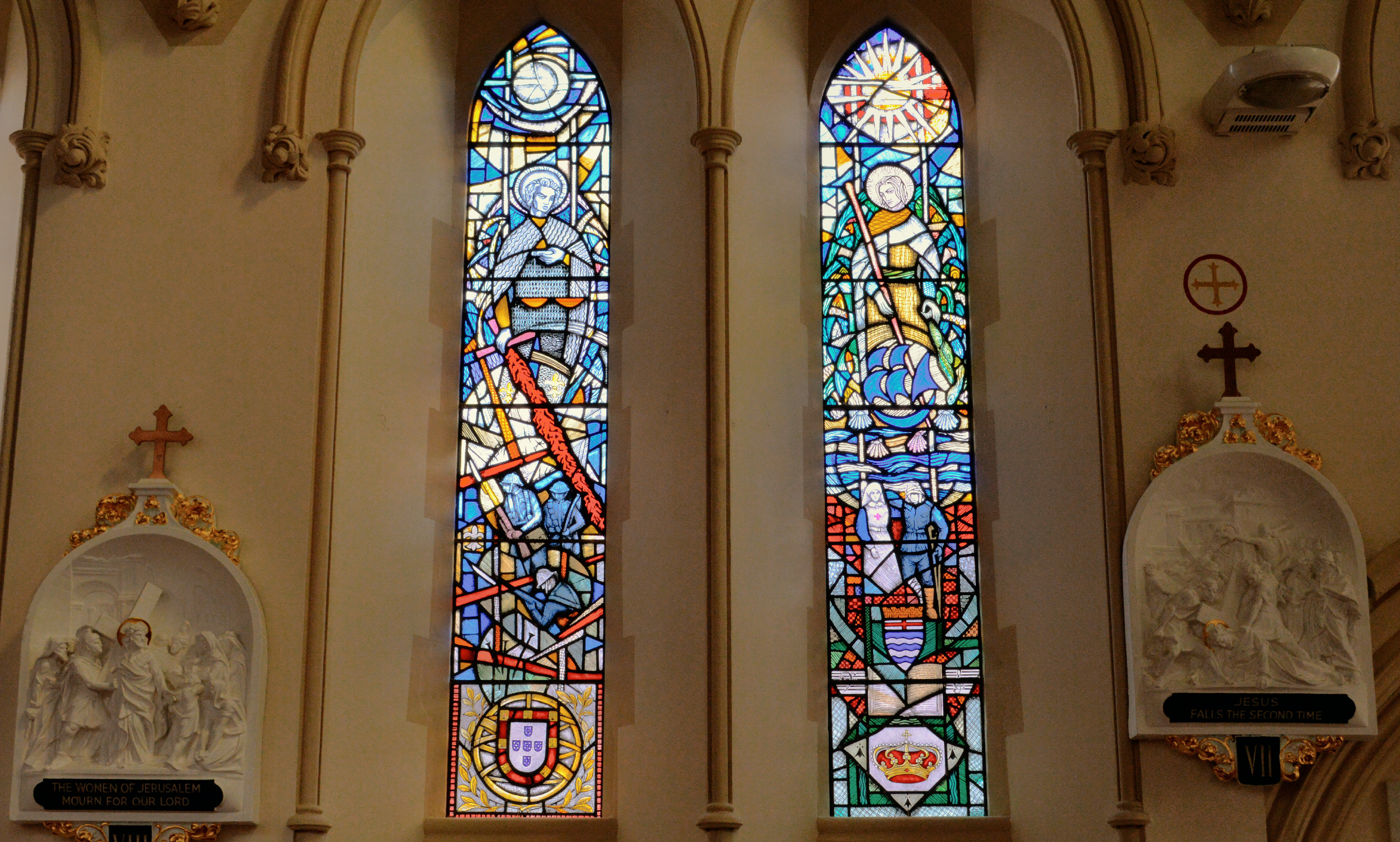
The Portuguese memorial windows

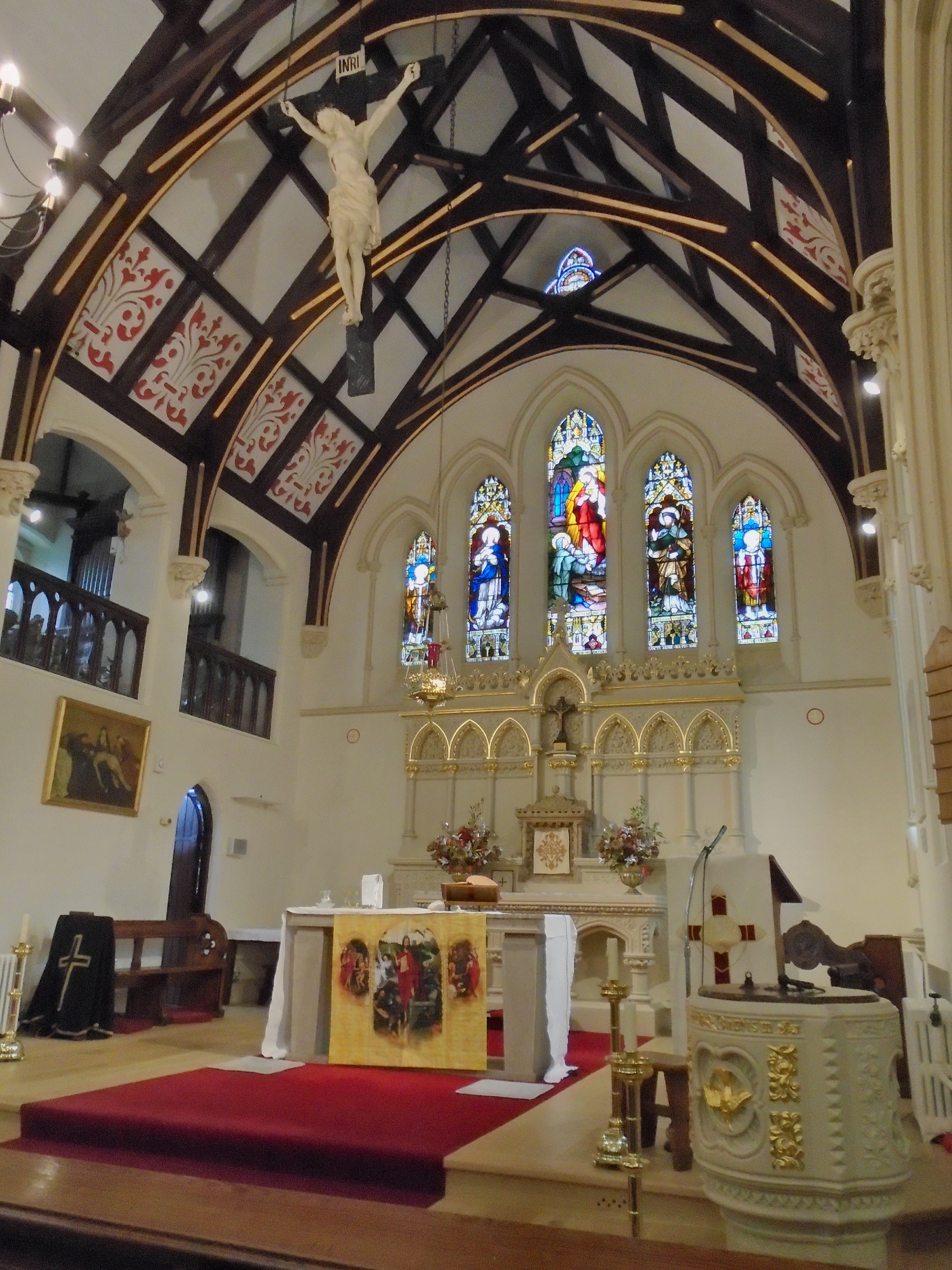
The Sanctuary

== Parish of St James ==
The Parish expanded due to the establishment of Catholic schools and the attraction of Twickenham as a dormitory suburb with easy access to Central London, and to Heathrow and Gatwick Airports. St James's Primary School was opened in 1893 and St Catherine's Girls Independent School in 1914. St Richard Reynolds Catholic Community College provided a much needed Secondary School when it was opened in 2013 by Cardinal Vincent Nichols, Archbishop of Westminster and Archbishop Peter Smith of Southwark. St Mary's University is part of the parish, and Pope Benedict XVI visited St Mary's in 2010. The university is adjacent to Strawberry Hill House, Horace Walpole's 18th-century Gothic revival villa.

In 2004 a link was established with the Roman Catholic Diocese of Chișinău in Moldova and launched a fundraising programme to support the construction of a children's centre in Bender, Transdniestria. Deacon Peter Coates of the Diocese of Chișinău, and Fr Ulick Loring worked with Bishop Anton Cosa of Chișinău on this project. Bishop Cosa initiated an Anglo-Moldovan charity, Moldova Not Forgotten, when he visited St James's in 2009.

The changing environment of the area led to a need to expand the church and a parish centre was built behind the church, which added a side chapel dedicated to St Joseph. The new centre was named the Emmanuel Centre in deference to King Manuel and Sister Emmanuel O'Donoghue who worked for many years in local education and parish life. These buildings were completed in 2013. In 2016, the parish supported an orphanage in Eritrea run by the Daughters of St Anne, based in Rome. Amongst other charities they also support CAFOD, the Richmond Food Bank, Mary's Meals, Aid to the Church in Need, and Empowering Vulnerable Children, Uganda. More recently a link has been established with the Ukrainian restaurant Prosperity to collect aid for the victims of the war un the Ukraine. This was subsequently established to be unnecessary. In 2023 a history of the parish written by Fr Ulick Loring was published. It covered Roman Catholicism in the parish from the time of the Reformation.
