= St Mary's Church, Twickenham =

Church in London, England, United Kingdom

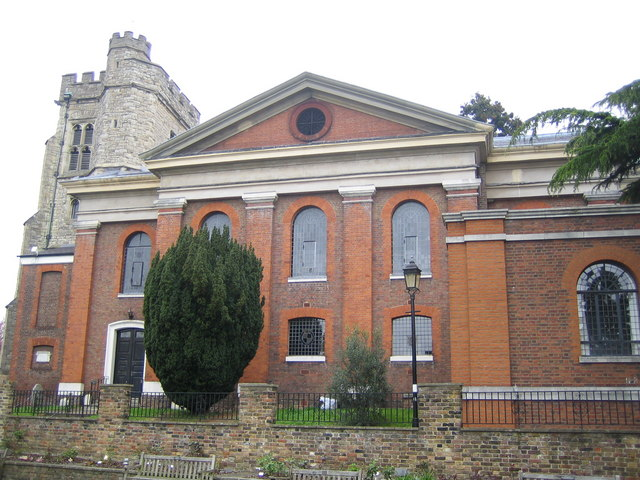
- St Mary's Church, Twickenham (in 2006)

- 51.447°N 0.3255°W
- Location: Church Street, Twickenham, Middlesex, England
- Country: England
- Denomination: Church of England
- Website: stmarytwick.org.uk

History
- Dedication: St Mary the Virgin
- Consecrated: 1714

Architecture
- Architect: John James
- Architectural type: Neo-classical

Specifications
- Materials: brick, stone

Administration
- Province: Canterbury
- Diocese: London Archdeaconry of Middlesex (Kensington Area)
- Archdeaconry: Middlesex
- Deanery: Hampton
- Parish: St Mary's, Twickenham

Clergy
- Vicar: Revd Jeff Hopkin Williams

Listed Building – Grade II*
- Official name: Church of St Mary
- Designated: 2 September 1952
- Reference no.: 1080852

St Mary's Church, Twickenham, also known as St Mary the Virgin, Twickenham, is a Grade II* listed Church of England place of worship dedicated to Saint Mary the Virgin. It is on Church Street, Twickenham in the London Borough of Richmond upon Thames, England. The parish church stands a short distance from York House and the banks of the River Thames, immediately opposite Eel Pie Island.

== History ==
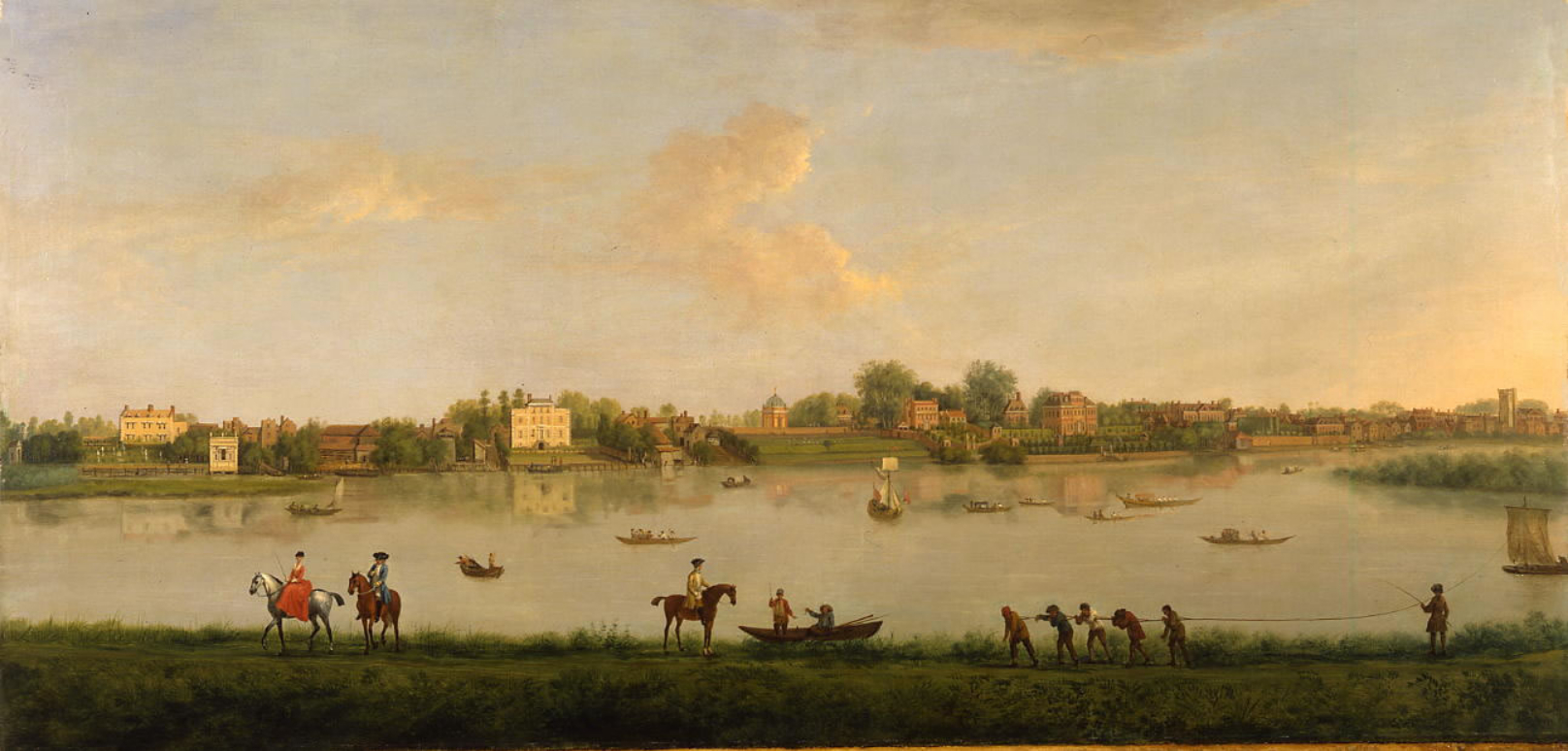
The Thames at Twickenham by Peter Tillemans, c.1724. The tower of St Mary's can be seen on the right of the painting

The church stands on the site of an earlier one and incorporates its 15th-century medieval tower. On 9 April 1713 the ancient church's 14th-century nave collapsed. The painter Godfrey Kneller was a churchwarden of St Mary's at the time and was active in the plans for reconstruction in the Neo-classical style by the local architect John James. A local resident, Lady Wentworth, wrote a month after the collapse that it had been foreseen by a new vicar, Dr Pratt:

Dr Pratt had insisted that a tabernakle be erected in the churchyard, prior to the collapse. Soe he preached there and exhorted al to giv thanks for thear great deleverenc for the church not falling when they wear in it, it being then standing. The people all laughed at him, and in a weeks time it fell to the ground, soe all the parish contrebutse to the building of it.

Inside the 18th-century church some older monuments have survived from the medieval nave, including a brass to Richard Burton, the King's chief cook, and Agnes his wife, dated 1443. Other monuments include those to:

- The Rt Hon. Lady Margaret Wildman (d.1825) by Sir Richard Westmacott RA
- George Gostlin (d.1782) and his wife Anne (d.1799) by John Bacon Junior
- Sir Chaloner Ogle (d.1750), Baronet and Admiral of the Fleet, by John Michael Rysbrack
- Nathaniel Pigott (d.1737) by Peter Scheemakers
- Alexander Pope (d.1761) by Prince Hoare of Bath.

On 20 June 1721 Dr Pratt baptised at the church "James Shandayes and John Twogood", described as two Indian princes. They were followed in 1747 by Henry Fielding's son William. Hallam Tennyson, son of the poet Alfred, Lord Tennyson, and eventually second Governor-General of Australia, was christened at the church in 1852.

The 18th-century nave of the church is in red brick with Tuscan pilasters and pediments. Following the reconstruction of 1713–14, the church was enlarged in 1754 and contains fittings of the same period, including a reredos and gallery fronts. The tower has a ring of eight bells, of which one dates from the early 16th century, three from the 17th and four from the 18th.

== Extent of parish ==
Like the ancient church on the site, the present one began life as the parish church for the whole of Twickenham. However, housing development in the 19th and 20th centuries led to new parishes being created for several new Church of England churches: Holy Trinity Twickenham (1842), St Philip and St James Church, Whitton (1862), St Stephen's, Twickenham (1875), All Saints Church, Twickenham (1914) and All Hallows, Twickenham (1939). As these came into being, the parish of St Mary's became smaller, but it still takes in most of central Twickenham.

== Burials ==
- Bridget Markham and Cecily Bulstrode, ladies in waiting to Anne of Denmark who both died at Twickenham Park in 1609. Markham is commemorated with an inscription inside.
- Sir William Berkeley (1605–1677), Governor of Virginia from 1660 to 1677, was laid to rest in the crypt of the church in 1677, unusually encased in "lead exactly fitted to the shape of the body, shewing the form of the features, hands, feet, and even nails", instead of a coffin. A year later he was joined by the remains of his brother Lord Berkeley, one of the Lords Proprietor of New Jersey. The brothers are commemorated in a memorial window in the present church, under which the ancient crypt survives.
- Sir Godfrey Kneller died in 1723 and his remains were entombed in the church.
- Charlotte Boscawen Moore, Countess of Drogheda, widow of Henry Moore, 4th Earl of Drogheda and the daughter of Hugh Boscawen, 1st Viscount Falmouth who 'dy'd April the 3d 1735 in the 32d Year of her Age' is buried in the nave.
- Alexander Pope (1688–1744) lies in the church under a stone slab engraved simply with the letter P, near a bronze memorial plate, joining his mother, Edith Pope (1643–1733), who had been buried in the church in 1733.
- The actress and soprano singer Kitty Clive (1711–1785) was buried in the churchyard in 1785. A plaque to her memory was affixed to the outside wall in the north-east angle of the church chancel.
- General William Tryon (1729–1788), a soldier who served as governor of the Province of North Carolina (1765–1771) and of the Province of New York (1771–1780) was buried in the churchyard in 1788.
- At the north-east corner of the church, in the graveyard, is a memorial to the tea merchant Thomas Twining (1675–1741).
- Martha Bruce, Countess of Elgin and Kincardine, former governess of Princess Charlotte of Wales, was buried at St Mary's on 4 July 1810.
- William Howe (1729–1814), a British Army officer and politician who rose to become Commander-in-Chief, America, during the American War of Independence.

There is a memorial to timber merchant James Montgomrey's wife Henrietta (1818–1905) in the church, but both she and her husband were buried at Isleworth Cemetery

The funeral of Neil Aspinall (1941–2008), head of The Beatles' company Apple Corps and sometimes called "the fifth Beatle", took place at the church in 2008, although Aspinall was buried at Teddington.

== St Mary's Church in art ==
The church is featured in Osmund Caine's painting Wedding at Twickenham Parish Church (1948), which is in the London Borough of Richmond upon Thames Art Collection.

== See also ==
- All Hallows Twickenham
- Holly Road Garden of Rest
- Pope's Urn
