= Osmund Caine =

English painter

George Osmund Caine (16 July 1914 – 11 November 2004) was an artist, art teacher and stained-glass designer.

Caine was born in Manchester, England and studied at the Birmingham School of Art. He taught art at the Kingston School of Art, and then at Twickenham College of Technology, where he founded its graphic design school.

In 1948 he moved to a house on Kingston Hill, where he lived with his wife Mary whom he married in 1944. They had four sons and a daughter.

== Works ==
Caine's paintings have been described as “more Stanley Spencer than Stanley Spencer”. His works include:

- Wedding at Twickenham Parish Church (1948), which is in the London Borough of Richmond upon Thames Art Collection
- Zebras, Chessington Zoo, Surrey, which is at Kingston History Centre in the Royal Borough of Kingston upon Thames
- Spider Hutments, Mychett Barracks, Aldershot 1940, which is in the British Government Art Collection
- The Grand Union Canal, Brentford Lock, painted in 1954, which is in the British Government Art Collection

The most extensive collection of Caine's stained glass is at the Grade II* listed All Saints' Church, Four Oaks in Bellwell Lane, Birmingham. Caine also designed the stained glass east window to the chancel of the Church of St Cuthbert in Portsmouth.
