= List of schools in the London Borough of Richmond upon Thames =

This is a list of schools in the London Borough of Richmond upon Thames, England.

== State-funded schools ==
=== Primary schools ===
- Archdeacon Cambridge's CE Primary School
- Barnes Primary School
- Bishop Perrin CE Primary School
- Buckingham Primary School
- Carlisle Infant School
- Chase Bridge Primary School
- Collis Primary School
- Darell Primary School
- Deer Park School
- East Sheen Primary School
- Hampton Hill Junior School
- Hampton Infant School
- Hampton Junior School
- Hampton Wick Infant School
- Heathfield Infant School
- Heathfield Junior School
- Holy Trinity CE Primary School
- Kew Riverside Primary School
- The King's CE Primary School
- Lowther Primary School
- Marshgate Primary School
- Meadlands Primary School
- Nelson Primary School
- Orleans Primary School
- The Russell Primary School
- Sacred Heart RC Primary School
- St Edmund's RC Primary School
- St Elizabeth's RC Primary School
- St James's RC Primary School
- St John the Baptist CE Junior School
- St Mary Magdalen's RC Primary School
- St Mary's & St Peter's CE Primary School
- St Mary's CE Primary School
- St Mary's Hampton CE Primary School
- St Osmund's RC Primary School
- St Richard Reynolds RC College
- St Richard's CE Primary School
- St Stephen's CE Primary School
- Sheen Mount Primary School
- Stanley Primary School
- Thomson House School
- Trafalgar Infant School
- Trafalgar Junior School
- Twickenham Primary Academy
- The Vineyard School

=== Secondary schools ===
- Christ's School, Richmond
- Grey Court School, Ham
- Hampton High, Hampton
- Orleans Park School, Twickenham
- Richmond Park Academy, East Sheen
- Richmond upon Thames School, Twickenham
- St Richard Reynolds Catholic College, Twickenham
- Teddington School, Teddington
- Turing House School, Whitton
- Twickenham School, Whitton
- Waldegrave School, Twickenham

=== Special and alternative schools ===
- Capella House School
- Clarendon School
- Strathmore School

=== Further education ===
- Richmond and Hillcroft Adult Community College, Richmond and Surbiton
- Richmond upon Thames College, Twickenham

== Independent schools ==
=== Primary and preparatory schools ===
- Broomfield House School, Kew
- Jack and Jill School, Hampton
- Kew College Prep, Kew
- Kew Green Preparatory School, Kew
- King's House School, Richmond
- The Mall School, Twickenham
- Newland House School, Twickenham
- The Old Vicarage School, Richmond Hill
- Radnor House Prep School, Richmond
- St Paul's Juniors, Barnes
- Tower House School, East Sheen
- Twickenham Preparatory School, Twickenham
- Unicorn School, Kew

=== Senior and all-through schools ===
- German School London, Petersham
- Hampton Court House School, Hampton Court
- Hampton School, Hampton
- The Harrodian School, Barnes
- Lady Eleanor Holles School, Hampton
- Radnor House School, Twickenham
- Royal Ballet School, Richmond Park
- St Catherine's School, Twickenham
- St Paul's School, Barnes
- The Swedish School in London, Barnes and (for sixth form studies), Kew

== Sources ==
- Nelson, Helen McCutcheon & Pearce, Brian Louis (1994). The Happiest Days... A History of Education in Twickenham Part 1: 1645–1918. Borough of Twickenham Local History Society. p. 29. ISBN 0-903341-59-X.
