= St Margarets, London =

Coordinates: 51.46°N 0.32°W

St Margarets
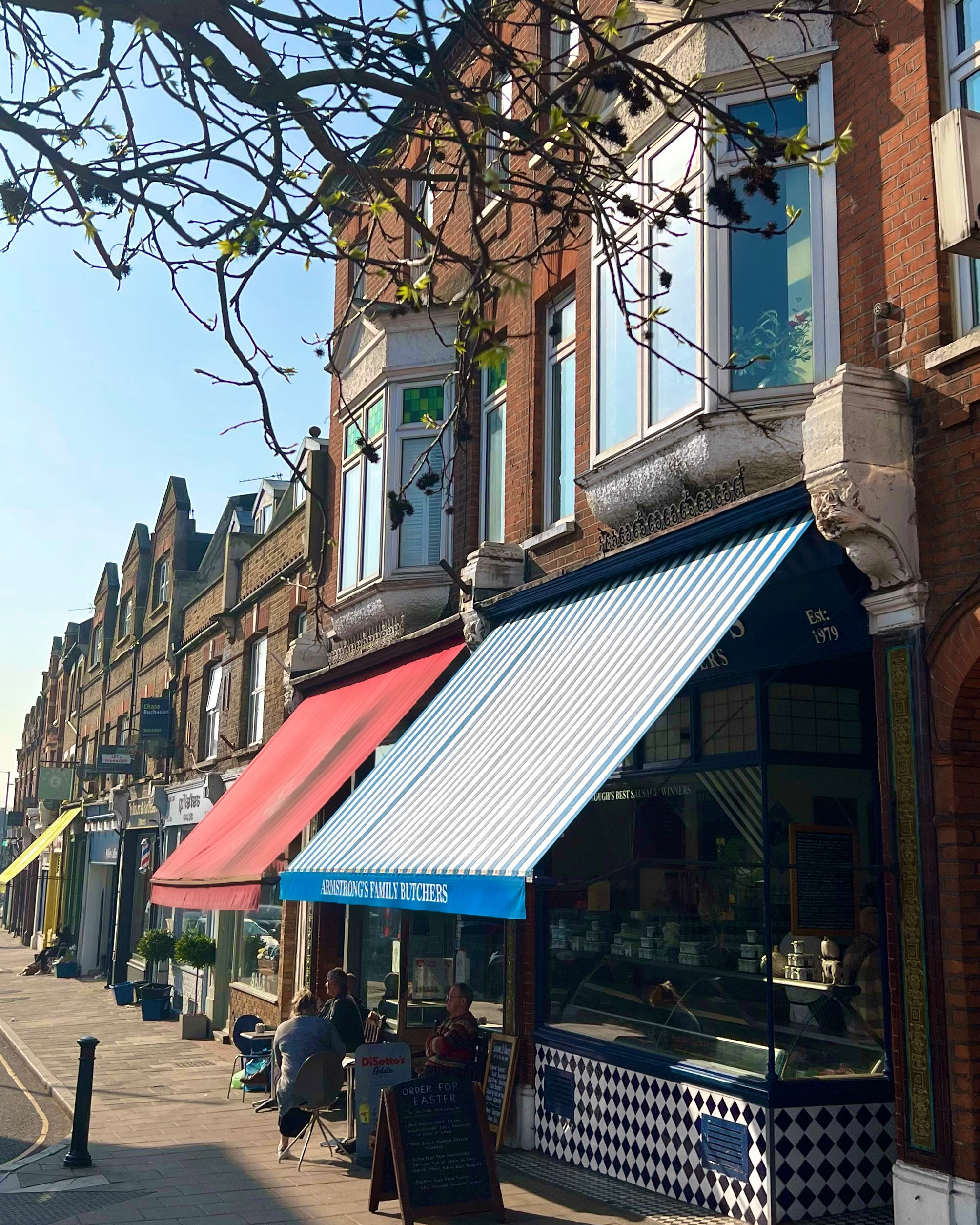
- Independent shops and cafes in Crown Road, St Margarets

- Location within Greater London
- Population: 3,872 2011 census: loosely associated electoral ward
- OS grid reference: TQ168742
- London borough: Richmond
- Ceremonial county: Greater London
- Region: London
- Country: England
- Sovereign state: United Kingdom
- Post town: Twickenham
- Postcode district: TW1
- Dialling code: 020
- Police: Metropolitan
- Fire: London
- Ambulance: London
- UK Parliament: Twickenham
- London Assembly: South West

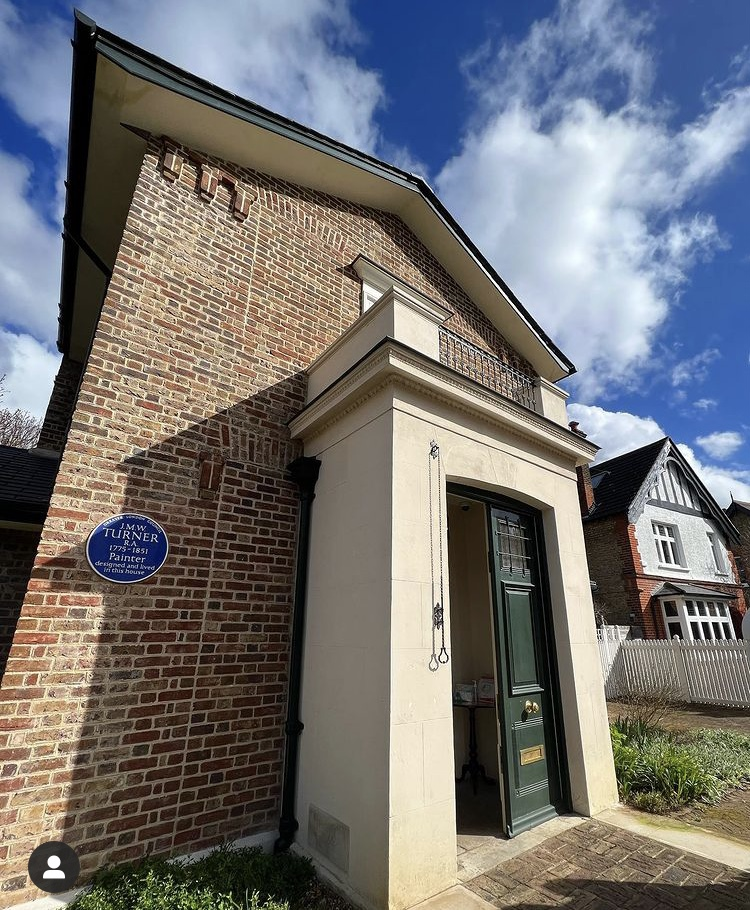
Turner's House

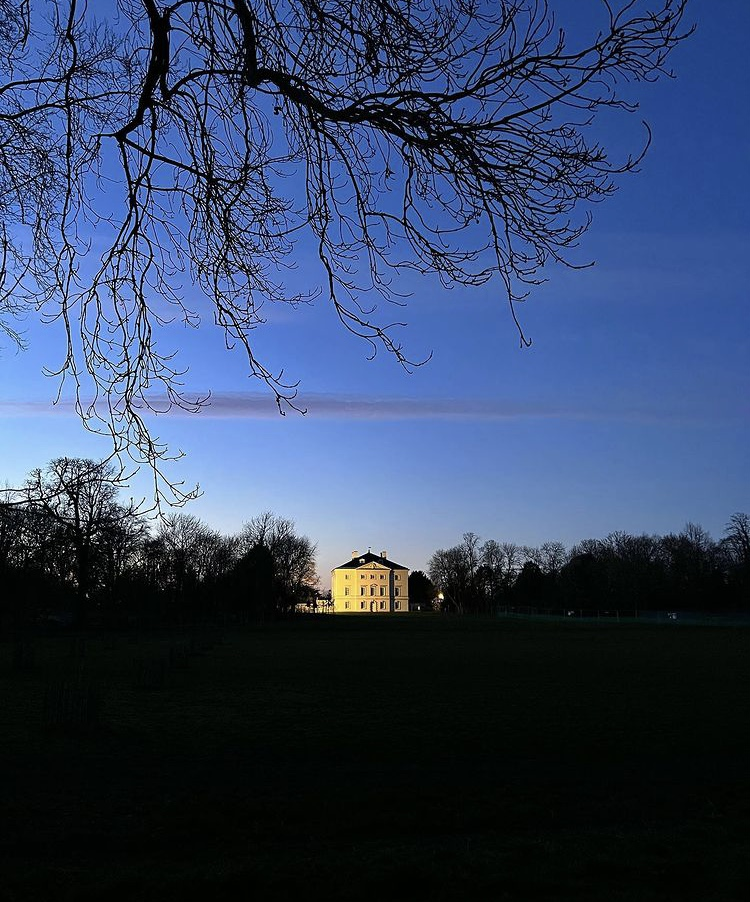
Marble Hill House

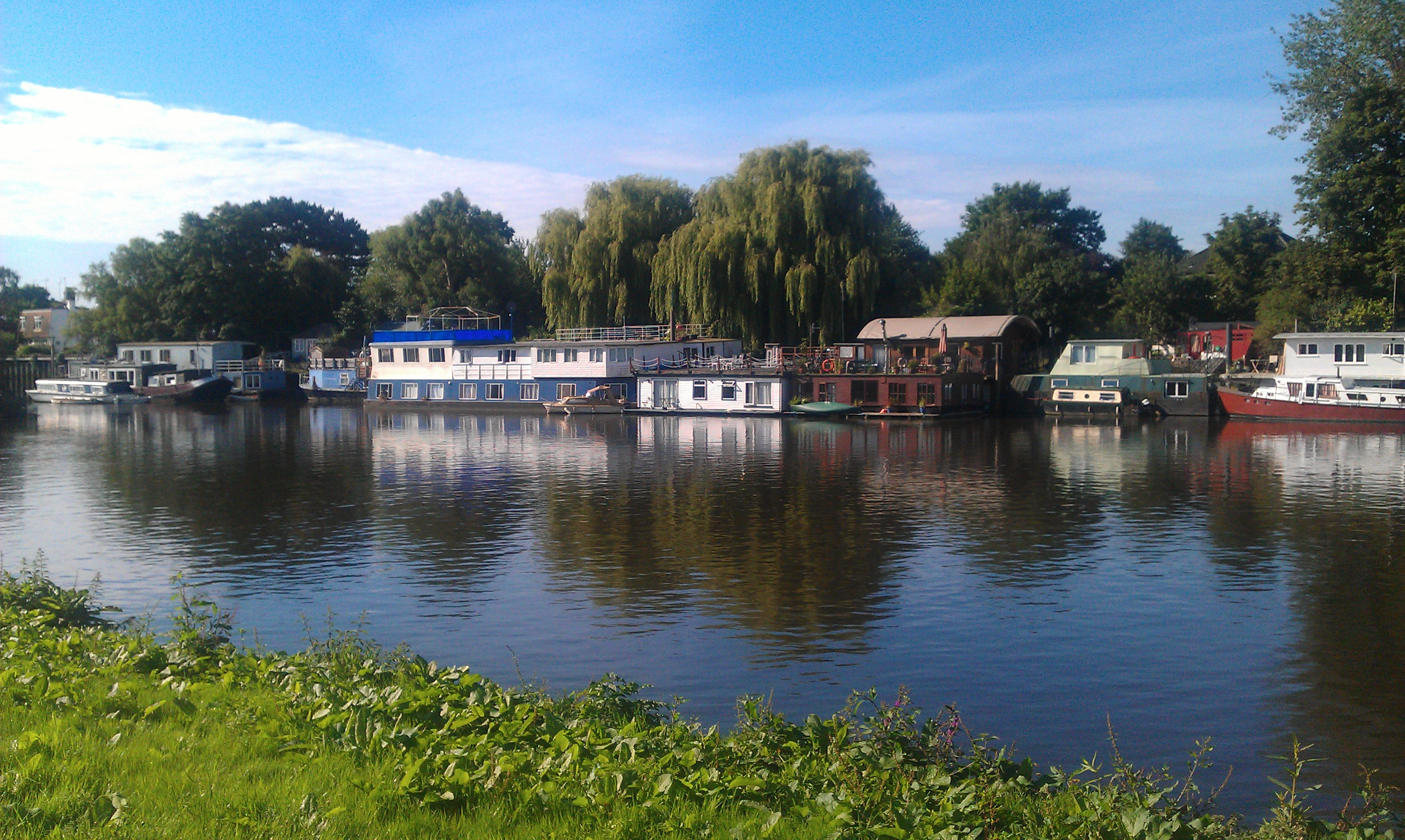
Houseboats on river Thames, close to Twickenham Bridge

St Margarets is a suburb and neighbourhood in the London Borough of Richmond upon Thames, about 9 miles (14 km) west-southwest of central London. It is bounded by the Thames Tideway to the north-east, and the River Crane to the north-west and north where the land tapers between those rivers. (Note: This border has slightly deviated in several local government boundary changes.) Land and buildings closer to Richmond Bridge than to the eponymous railway station are, traditionally distinctly, known as East Twickenham. Both places often go by the name of their post town and traditional parish, Twickenham; in the 19th century to the south of St Margarets was marked on maps as Twickenham Park.

The area hosts a house that J. M. W. Turner saw built during his painting career and St Margarets railway station is within 1/3 mile (0.54 km) of Marble Hill House.

Uniquely in London among the few places prefixed Saint, it is named after a house. Specifically it is named after a large house together with appurtenant land of an 18th-century Scottish-New Jerseyan aristocrat, rather than a church which began in 1930.

== History ==
The place hosted, in the south-east, remnants of the site of an encampment of the barons and their men in 1261. This refers to a minor civil war of the last three weeks of June or so – a power struggle between the crown (ministry of Henry III of England) and the aristocracy, a few uprisings later cemented into constitutional change led by de Montford. The net result of the uprisings was a settled parliamentary system enabling limits to the monarch's powers to tax and departure from such edicts as the Provisions of Oxford and Westminster.

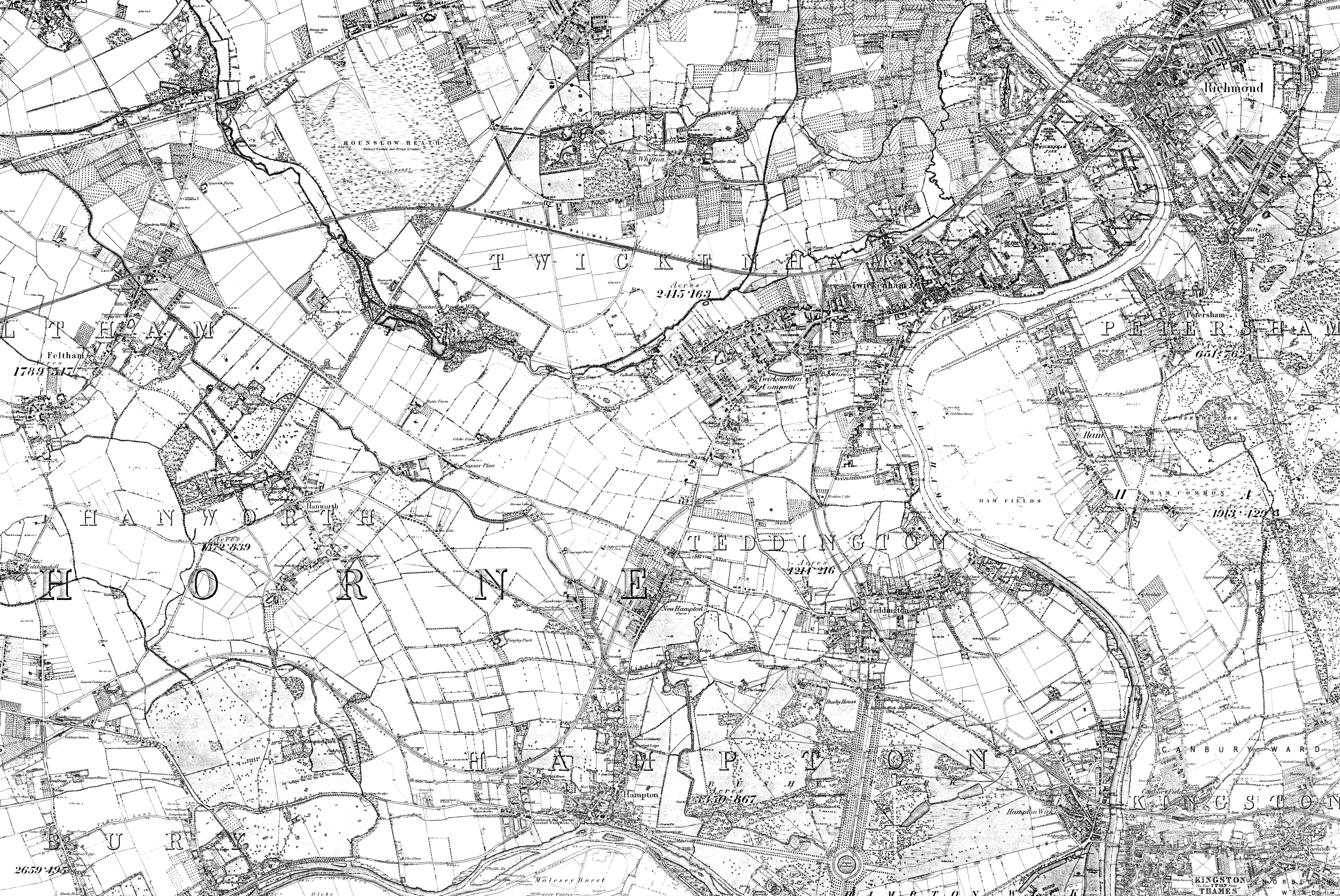
The district and the west of the Cambridge Park/Marble Hill area and the near-centre of Twickenham, with part of Richmond (across the river): 1870s. Click for broader map and to enable varied magnification.

Saint Margarets takes its name from the former Saint Margaret's House, the second guise of which stood from 1827 to 1853. It was the country house of Archibald Kennedy, 1st Marquess of Ailsa (12th Earl of Cassilis), and for a few final decades became the home of the Earl of Kilmorey. Their names can be found in such streets as Kilmorey Gardens and Ailsa Road.

Victorian and Edwardian houses dominate the housing stock. In 1854 the St Margaret's Estate was laid out for building family houses, becoming one of the first garden suburbs.

Today's developed suburb dates from the arrival of the railway. The new railway station was preliminarily named Ailsa Crossing as it passed through the estate, but it became St Margarets before opening.

A memorial was unveiled in April 2017 to the 6000 Belgian refugees, many of the adults of whom lived and worked locally during the First World War. It is on the west bank of the Thames at Warren Gardens, next to the site of the Pelabon Munitions Works.

== Governance ==
St Margarets is part of the Twickenham constituency for elections to the House of Commons of the United Kingdom.

St Margarets is part of the St Margarets and North Twickenham ward for elections to Richmond upon Thames London Borough Council.

== Annual events ==
St Margarets Fair is held each July in Moormead Park by the River Crane, a channel from its larger stream, on the western limits.

== Buildings ==
In 1814 the painter J. M. W. Turner had built Solus Lodge in Sandycoombe Road. The house survives as Sandycombe Lodge.

Gordon House is a Grade II*-listed Georgian mansion on the river Thames at St Margarets. Like St Margaret's House, it was owned by Lord Kilmorey. The house has a Robert Adam wing, added in 1738. For many years, it was used as part of Brunel University. In recent years the house has been redeveloped by Octagon Developments, with the former chapel and coachhouse converted to private homes.

A number of other large villas and houses were put up by Leonard Wild Lloyd in the 1820s and 1830s in East Twickenham, many since replaced by housing. Among the survivors are the Grade II listed buildings Bute Lodge, Willoughby House and Ryde House.

The Kilmorey Mausoleum has been moved several times, and is now on the northern edge of St Margarets. It was built in the 1850s by the 2nd Earl of Kilmorey and contains the bodies of the Earl and his mistress, Priscilla Anne Hoste. Now a Grade II* listed building, it was built to resemble an ancient Egyptian monument. It is jointly maintained by Richmond upon Thames Council and English Heritage. The mausoleum is occasionally open to the public.

The Roman Catholic Church of St Margaret of Scotland on St Margarets Road was built to a modern design of the architect Austin Winckley and opened in 1969. In 1999 it became a Grade II listed building. Its forerunner stood on site from 1938, after the relevant mission begun in an adjoining house in 1930. Twickenham and Isleworth as broad encompassing areas have had no other churches named after the saint.

In Anglicanism, two late-19th-century-founded Anglican church parishes serve the area. The place represents the north-west third of Saint Stephen's and the eastern two-fifths of All Souls, if the Crane is taken as the northern limit.

== Education ==
There are three main schools nearby, in Twickenham: Orleans Park School (secondary), St. Stephen's Primary School (primary) and Orleans Primary School (primary).

== Local commerce and townscape ==
Two main streets have a range of shops, cafés and bars/pubs serving food. Twickenham Studios are at the heart of the village and have recently announced plans to expand their presence in St Margarets.

== Neighbouring areas ==
Direct neighbours comprise:

- East Twickenham/Cambridge Park to the south-east.
- Richmond across the river to the east.
- Twickenham from the west through to the south.
- Old Isleworth and the Ivybridge estate, Isleworth is to the north and northwest in the adjoining London Borough of Hounslow.

Between Richmond Lock and Kew Bridge is the first reach of the Thames proceeding upstream out of Central London on both sides: Kew Gardens and Syon Park.

Marble Hill House and Marble Hill Park are immediately to the south.

== Notable inhabitants ==
=== Living people ===
Name	Description	Connection	Ref
Samantha Bond	Actress	Brought up in Barnes and in St Margarets. With husband, actor Alexander Hanson, resident in St Margarets.	
Milton Jones	Comedian	Lives in St Margarets.	
Sophie Raworth	Newsreader and journalist	Lives in St Margarets.	

=== Historical figures ===
Name	Dates	Description	Local connection	Ref
Lynn Faulds Wood	1948–2020	Television presenter and cancer campaigner	With John Stapleton, journalist and presenter, resident.	
Arnold Gerschwiler	1914–2003	Figure skating coach at Richmond Ice Rink	Lived in Ailsa Road for 53 years.	
Simon Hoggart	1946–2014	Broadcaster and journalist	Lived in Sandycoombe Road	
Henrietta Howard	1734–1767	Influential courtier and mistress to King George II	George II built her a residence, Marble Hill House (now a museum) in Marble Hill Park.	
William Cook Mackenzie	1862–1952	Scottish historian	Lived in Richmond and later St Georges Road, St Margarets	
Garry Marsh	1902–1981	Stage and film actor	Born in St Margarets.	
J. M. W. Turner	1775–1851	English Romantic painter, printmaker and watercolourist	Had built country retreat on Sandycoombe Road also known as Turner's House, open to the public.	
