= Turing House School =

Location
- 221a Hospital Bridge Road; Twickenham, Greater London, TW2 6LH; England; 51.4504096°N 0.3699185°W

Information
- Type: Free school
- Established: 2015
- Department for Education URN: 141963 Tables
- Ofsted: Reports
- Headteacher: Martin O'Sullivan
- Gender: Coeducational
- Age: 11 to 18
- Website: https://www.turinghouseschool.org.uk

Turing House School is a co-educational comprehensive secondary school which was opened in 2015 in the London Borough of Richmond, under the Government's free schools initiative.

The proposal for the school was initiated by local parents in 2011 in partnership with the Russell Education Trust (RET), who also operate five other free schools in southern England.

Turing House School is named in honour of Alan Turing, the famous mathematician who lived for a while in nearby Hampton when he worked at the National Physical Laboratory. The school is governed by RET, with some governance responsibilities delegated to the school's local governing body.

== Performance ==
Like other schools, latest exam results and related data are published in the Department for Education's national tables, and latest inspection reports are published by Ofsted.

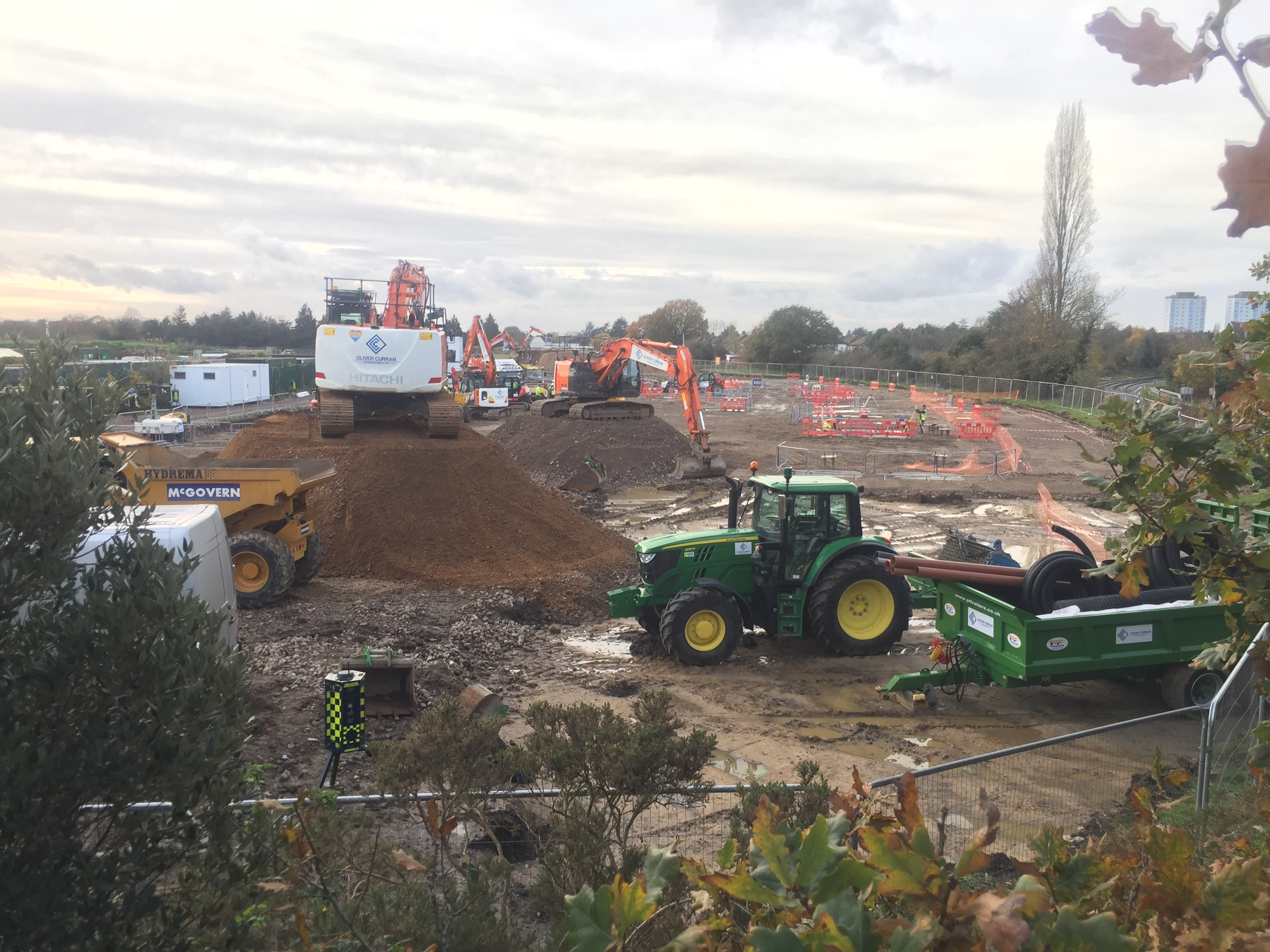
Turing House School's permanent site being constructed in November 2020

== Site history ==
Due to delays in securing a permanent site large enough for a secondary school, Turing House was initially opened in a converted office block in Teddington, using local sports facilities at Bushy Park, and, from 2018, a second site in Hampton.

It moved to its permanent site in Whitton, in April 2022. The site is adjacent to Borough Cemetery, Heathfield Recreation Ground, and Sempervirens Nursery (which is also the head office of the nursery's owner, Kingston Landscape Group). The permanent site resulted in controversy due to the Metropolitan Open Land designation.

== Admissions ==
Admissions for Year 7, and in-year admissions for all year groups are handled by Richmond Council's schools admission team. The 2019 Year 7 oversubscription criteria allocate places by distance from two admissions points in Fulwell and Heathfield at a ratio of 80:20.
