= Orleans Park School =

Location
- Richmond Road; Twickenham, London, TW1 3BB; England; 51.4495°N 0.32027°W

Information
- Type: Academy
- Motto: Be the Best You can Be
- Established: 1910 - Orleans Council School; 1973 - Orleans Park School
- Department for Education URN: 138651 Tables
- Ofsted: Reports
- Head teacher: Kathy Pacey
- Gender: Coeducational
- Age: 11 to 18
- Enrolment: 1,213
- Website: https://www.orleanspark.school/

Orleans Park School is a Mixed comprehensive school with academy status, located in the Twickenham area of the London Borough of Richmond upon Thames, England. It is situated 10 miles south-west of central London.

== Location and history ==
In the early 1900s Twickenham had two elementary schools, St Stephen's and St Mary's, that were struggling to accommodate all the children who were eligible to attend. Twickenham Council considered enlarging the existing schools but elected to build new ones. By December 1909, applications for the post of Headmaster of the new Orleans Council School, being erected in the Crown-road district of East Twickenham, had been received and on 6 December 1909 George Henry Cawte Spencer was appointed the headmaster. On accepting the appointment he said he would "endeavour to make the second Council school second to none in the town".

By 1910, Orleans Council School was opened in temporary accommodation and on 16 September 1911 the school on Hartington Road and Napoleon Road was formally opened. The buildings were designed for use ultimately for the infants department, accommodating 390 children, but at that time would be used for infants, as well as older boys and girls "until such time as it may be found necessary to erect the main boys' and girls' school building". Such was the speed of the development in the area that by 1913 tenders were submitted to build the senior buildings and in 1914 these were opened, designed to accommodate 840 boys and girls.

During the First World War, assistant schoolmaster C.G. Shaw became a Lieutenant attached to the Lincolnshire Regiment with the Expeditionary Force and was the first elementary schoolmaster in the country to gain the distinction of being mentioned in despatches. The school also became the home of a temporary school for Belgian children displaced by the war, under a Belgian headmistress for that department.

Demands for rebuilding the school were first made in 1946 and by 1964 a site had been acquired by Middlesex County Council in Orleans Park, although a new school had not been included in the Education Ministry's building programme up to 1967. In 1961, the school had already expanded by acquiring a sports field on Richmond Road, formerly the Exiles Football Ground, enhancing its facilities and extracurricular opportunities for students. In the mid-1960s, proposals to close or merge Orleans School with Kneller Girls' School as part of borough-wide secondary education reorganization faced significant opposition from parents and staff. A 1966 Middlesex Chronicle article documented a campaign against its closure, with over 3,250 signatures collected in protest.

By 1971, the Richmond Borough Council approved plans to replace Orleans School with a new mixed secondary school at Orleans Park, Twickenham. on four of the sixteen acres of the former Orleans House estate. The new building was designed as a 900-place school with a sixth form entry, aligning with the borough’s shift to a comprehensive system in 1972.

The pupils moved into the newly built and renamed Orleans Park School in September 1973 marking it as Richmond’s first purpose-built comprehensive school. On March 18, 1974, Margaret Thatcher, then Secretary of State for Education, was to have officially opened the new Orleans Park School on the Richmond Road site, however, these plans were postponed A second phase of building was completed in September 1975 and on Tuesday April 13 1976, Lord Boyle of Handsworth (then the vice-chancellor of Leeds University and a former Education Minister) opened the school officially.

The Headteacher who had overseen the transition of the school to the new site and name was Sidney Altman. He died in early 1977 whilst still serving as Headmaster, and the school's library was dedicated in his honour. The Altman Memorial Trophy was also presented to the school by his widow to be awarded annually for service to the school.

The school continued to expand and in 1993, Lord Richard Attenborough opened a new building at the school, contributing to the school's development. Orleans Park School gained specialist status as a Mathematics and Computing College in September 2003, as a Language College in September 2008 and it became an academy in 2012.

Sir David Attenborough, continued his family's connection with the school by opening the Attenborough Building, a new sixth form centre named in their family's honor, on March 10, 2015. During his speech, Sir David fondly remembered his brother, who had died the previous year, and expressed delight in the building's dedication to the Attenborough family.

== Uniform ==
The uniform consists of a maroon sweatshirt with an added gold band around the v., a white shirt and grey trousers or skirt; both the skirt and the jumper display the school's logo in gold, which from 2012 (when the school became as academy) became the interlocked letters O and P.

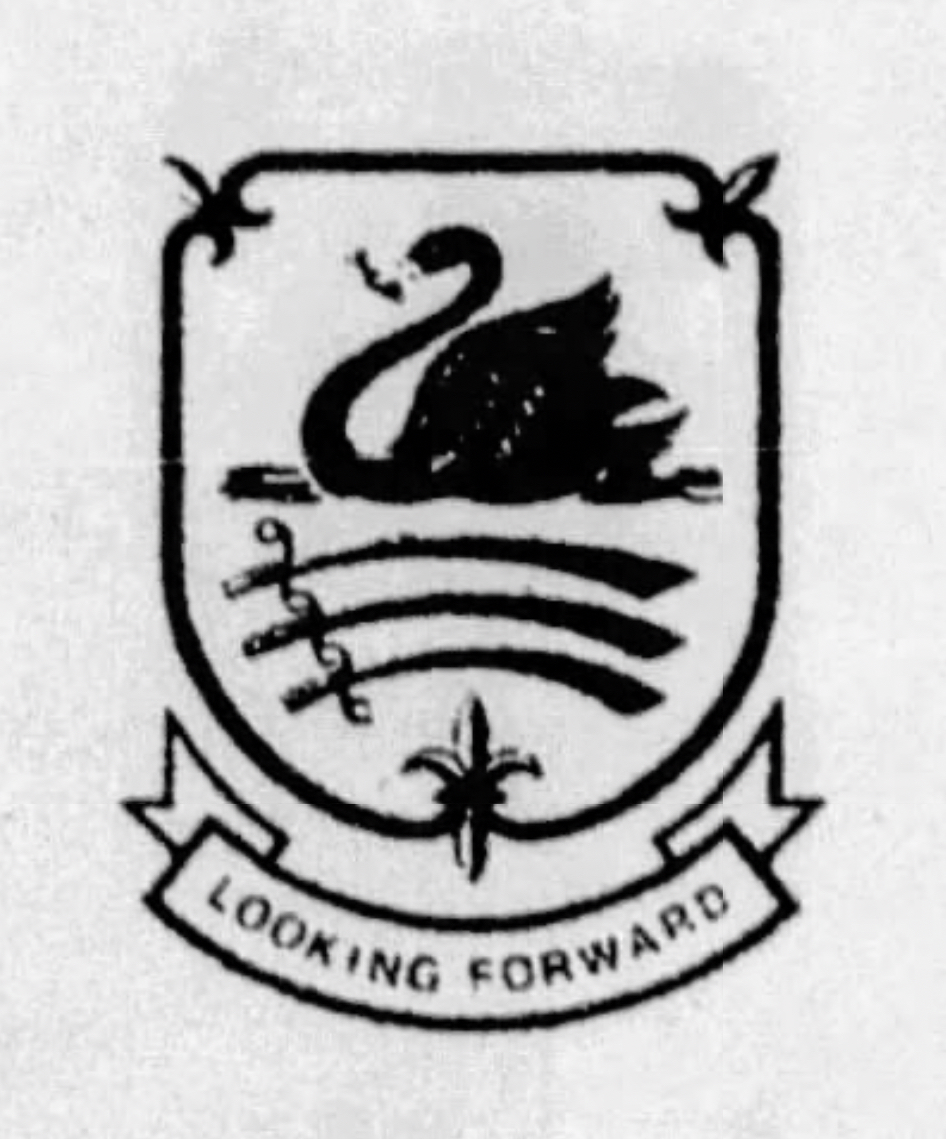
The prior logo of Orleans Park School in use in the 1980s, 1990s and early 2000s

Prior to that, the school's logo was a coat of arms-style emblem with several elements associated with its location including a swan at the top, below which were the three curved seaxes (saxon swords), representing Middlesex, and a fleur-de-lis symbol beneath the swords representing the historical French influence of the Orleans name. The school's motto, "Looking Forward" was unchanged, suggesting a progressive and future-focused ethos.

== Catchment ==
Many pupils at Orleans Park come from the following nearby primary schools: St. Stephen's School, Archdeacon Cambridge's School, St. Mary's School, Chase Bridge Primary School, Orleans Primary, Ivybridge school, and The Vineyard School.

== Performance ==
The school's history has seen a number of peaks and troughs in its overall performance. In the last quarter of the twentieth century, there are references to its high quality of the teaching. However, a fuller picture and history is only available once the Ofsted inspections became more regular following the Education (Schools) Act 1992. In 1997, there was a hard hitting inspection. The school then went through a difficult period immediately following that inspection after which time Ofsted noted that substantial improvements were made, especially after the appointment of David Talbot in 1999. GCSE results rose and attendance improved. A continued improvement can be charted through subsequent Ofsted reports, becoming Outstanding (the highest level) in 2010 and maintaining that since. In the 2024 GCSE examinations, 32% of students achieved the highest two grades with 92% of students attained a pass in English and Mathematics combined. At A Level, the school surpassed the national average for A*/A grades and 85% were A*-C.

Summary table of Ofsted inspections
| Year inspected | Ofsted grade | Headteacher | Ref | Notes |
|---|---|---|---|---|
| 2023 | Outstanding | Kathy Pacey | | Inspection |
| 2017 | Outstanding | Elaine Ball | | Full Inspection |
| 2010 | Outstanding | Joanna Longhurst | | Full Inspection |
| 2007 | Good | David Talbot | | Full Inspection |
| 2003 | No overall rating | David Talbot | | Full Inspection; No Ofsted single word (pre-2005). Summarised as a good school with many very strong features |

== Headteachers ==
=== Orleans County Secondary School ===
- George Henry Cawte Spencer - 1909 to pre-1939
- Charles Henry Howick - pre-1939 to 1944
- Norah Marietta Grace D'Etlinger - 1944 to 1945
- William McDermott Regan - 1945 to 1966
- E. L. Evans (Acting Headteacher) - 1966
- Sidney Altman - 1966 to 1973 (then transitioned to Orleans Park School)

=== Orleans Park School ===
- Sidney Altman - 1973 to 1977 (served until his death)
- Garth Freeman - 1978 to at least July 1986
- Mrs. E. Clarke - pre-1989 to 1990

Changing from her married name (Mrs. E. Clarke) to her maiden or subsequent name (Elizabeth/Betty Selman)

- Elizabeth Selman - 1990–1998
- David Talbot - 1999 to at least 2007
- Joanna Longhurst - pre-April 2010 to 2013
- Elaine Ball - 2013 to 2022
- Kathy Pacey - September 2022 to Present

== Notable former pupils ==
- Kizzy Edgell, actor
- Joe Anderson (actor)
- Heather Cowell, professional international rugby player and gymnast.
- Emma Uren, professional rugby player
- Claire Allan, Olympic 2016 Rugby Sevens player
- Julian Dunkerton, co-founder of Superdry
- Edd Gould, (1988-2012) creator of the web series Eddsworld
- Josh Herdman, actor best known for playing Gregory Goyle in the Harry Potter films
- Scott Overall, Olympic Marathon runner
- Rufus Sewell, film, theatre and television actor
- Fionn Whitehead, actor
- John Yorke, TV executive and author
- Caylin Raftopoulos, British professional basketball player.
- Jesse Kewley-Graham, English footballer.

== Notable former teachers ==
- Greg Davies, comedian and actor who taught drama at the school prior to his entertainment career. Best known for his role as the Taskmaster in Taskmaster, and as Mr Gilbert in The Inbetweeners
- Giselle Mather (née Prangnell), English rugby union international and coach, won 34 caps for England, part of the 1994 Women's World Cup winning side, first woman to achieve level 4 coaching status from the RFU, first woman to coach a male rugby union side, first coach of the Women's Barbarians and from 2024 coach of the Great Britain Women's rugby union sevens squad. Taught PE at the school from 1996 to 1999.
- Beth Potter, Paris 2024 Olympics Individual Triathlon bronze medalist. She was a former science teacher at Orleans Park School, teaching physics A-level up until 2016

== See also ==
- List of schools in Twickenham
