= Bute Lodge =

House in London, England

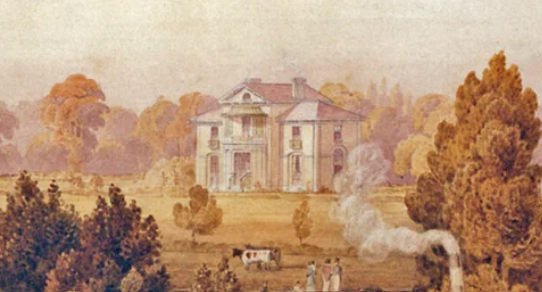
- Bute Lodge in an 1824 painting by George Barret Jr.
- Interactive map of the Bute Lodge area

General information
- Type: Residential
- Architectural style: Regency
- Location: London, England
- Coordinates: 51°27′22″N 0°18′44″W
- Completed: 1820s

Listed Building – Grade II
- Official name: Bute Lodge
- Designated: 22 May 1972
- Reference no.: 1065364

Bute Lodge is Grade II listed building on Park Road in the East Twickenham area of London.

== Description ==
The house was built in the 1820s as the central of three villas built by Leonard Wild Lloyd for the Richmond vintner George Topham. Originally the house was known as 3 Park Road, but the named was changed in 1869 the to Bute Lodge. The change of name was made by Alexander Tweedie, an Edinburgh University physician who lived in the house until his death in 1884.

The design is a work of Regency architecture, a stucco villa, likely inspired in its form by the nearby Sandycombe Lodge where Turner lived. The house is depicted in George Barret Junior's 1824 painting The Thames at Twickenham.

== See also ==
- Willoughby House
- Ryde House
