= St Stephen's, Twickenham =

- East Twickenham – St Stephen
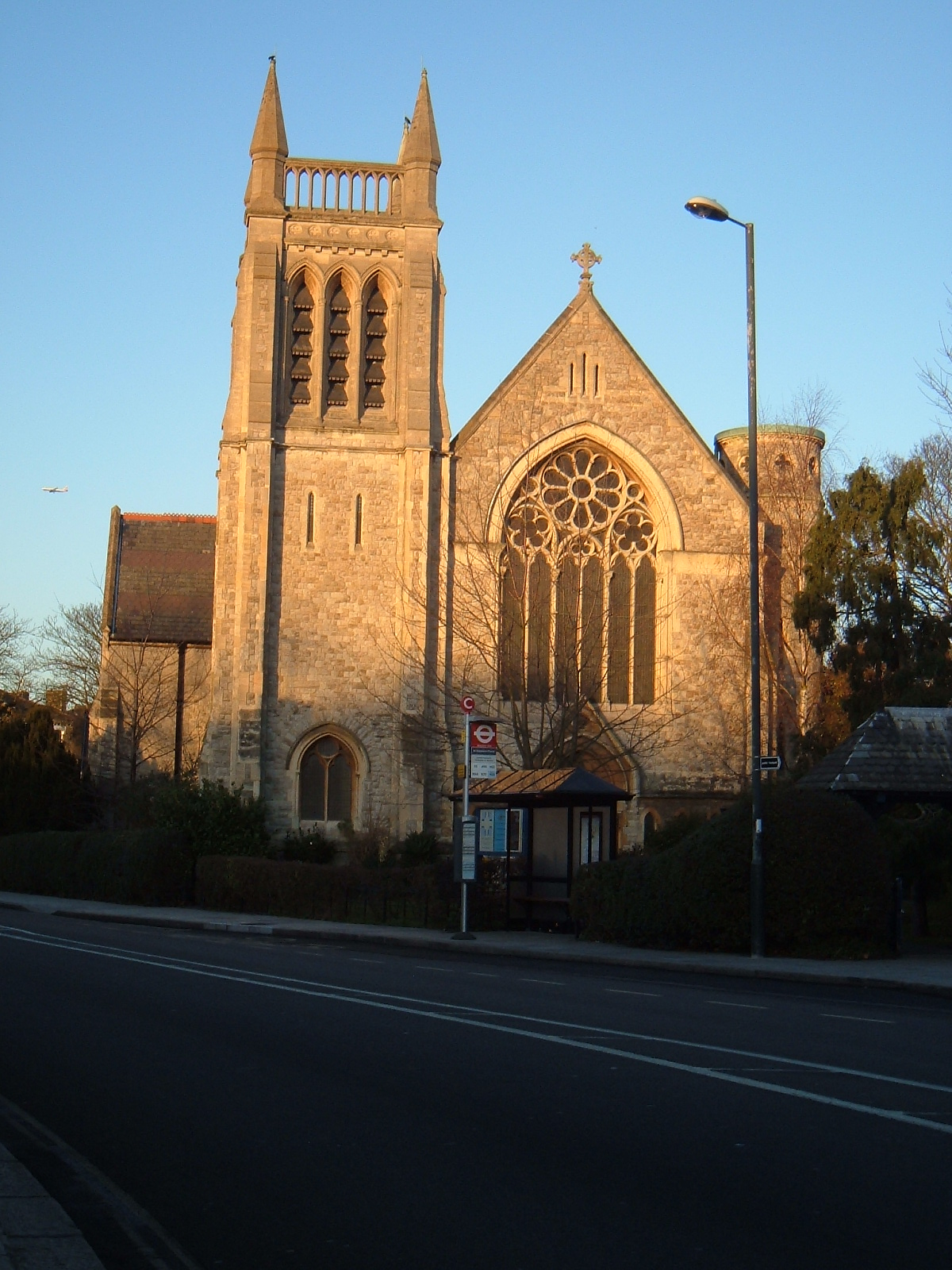
- St Stephen's Church
- St Stephen's, Twickenham
- 51.4534°N 0.31304°W
- OS grid reference: TQ 17315 74059
- Location: Richmond Road, Twickenham TW1 2PD
- Country: England
- Denomination: Church of England
- Website: www.st-stephens.org.uk

Architecture
- Architect(s): Lockwood & Mawson
- Style: Gothic Revival
- Years built: 1874

Specifications
- Materials: Kentish rag (exterior); brick (interior)

Administration
- Diocese: Diocese of London
- Archdeaconry: Middlesex
- Deanery: Hampton

Clergy
- Vicar: Libby Talbot

Listed Building – Grade II
- Official name: Church of St Stephen
- Designated: 19 March 2008
- Reference no.: 1392477

St Stephen's, Twickenham, is a Church of England church on Richmond Road in East Twickenham in the London Borough of Richmond upon Thames. Its vicar is Libby Talbot.

== History ==
The congregation dates from 1720 when a chapel was founded for the inhabitants of the newly built Montpellier Road with a capacity for a congregation of 250. With the opening of St. Margaret's railway station, the population grew and the new church building was commissioned to seat 1000 on the current site, the land donated by the Little family.

The church is unusual in that it does not adhere to the typical east-west orientation but instead faces north, due to the triangular shape of the donated land between Richmond Road and the ancient right of way St. Stephen's Passage.

A financial appeal to fund the construction of the church was launched in 1873, well exceeding the target £7000 within five months.

The architects T. M. Lockwood and T. H. Mawson were commissioned to design the church and the foundation stone was laid in 1874 by the Duchess of Teck. The foundations were completed by December 1875 and the nave was consecrated. The church became operational in 1876, at which point the Montpellier chapel was closed and used by various secular businesses until its collapse in 1941.

The chancel was added in 1885 and the tower in 1907, its consecration by the Bishop of Kensington marking the completion of the building. Further changes included the addition of the Centenary Room in 1976, the Spring in 2011 and the adaptation of the disused choir vestry into the current prayer chapel.

Most of the stained glass windows are by Alfred Octavius Hemming (1843–1907). The organ, installed in 1889, is one of the best preserved Henry Willis & Sons organs in London.

The building is Grade II listed.

== St. Stephen's CofE Primary School ==
St. Stephen's School, Twickenham, a mixed, state-run, Church of England primary school on Winchester Road, is affiliated with St Stephen's Church and regularly holds events there. Incorporated into the school building is a chapel built on the northernmost edge of the parish (the exterior on Chertsey Road bears a plaque reading 'St Stephen's Church Hall').
