= Whitton Baptist Church =

Church in Whitton, England

- Whitton Baptist Church
- 51°27′15.4″N 0°21′33.8″W
- Location: Hounslow Road, Whitton TW2 7BZ
- Country: England
- Denomination: Baptist
- Website: www.whittonbaptist.co.uk

History
- Founded: 1934

Administration
- Division: London Baptist Association.

Clergy
- Pastor: Rev. Gordon Hindmarch

Whitton Baptist Church is a church in Hounslow Road, Whitton in Richmond upon Thames, London. It is a member of the London Baptist Association.

== History ==
The two foundation stones set into the front wall of the church carry the date October 20, 1934. The present church building was opened on 6 April 1935. The new building, financed by the sale of St Margarets Baptist Church, replaced Whitton Gospel Hall which had opened in 1881.

The church's halls were opened in September 1968 on the site of an old tennis court. They replaced two previous halls, one of which was destroyed in a fire in 1966, and the other on a site which is now part of the church's car park.

== Ministers ==
1936 Rev. Walter G. Davis
1943 Rev. Albert Cassidy
1970 Rev. Derek Buckingham
1976 Rev. Barry Vendy
1984 Rev. Martin Smith
1998 Rev. Andy Gore
2014 Rev. Gordon Hindmarch
