= Nodal Point =

Nodal Point may refer to:

- Nodal point, a cardinal point in optics
- Nodal admissions point, a location used in UK school admission policy
