= Willoughby House, Twickenham =

Building in London, England

Willoughby House
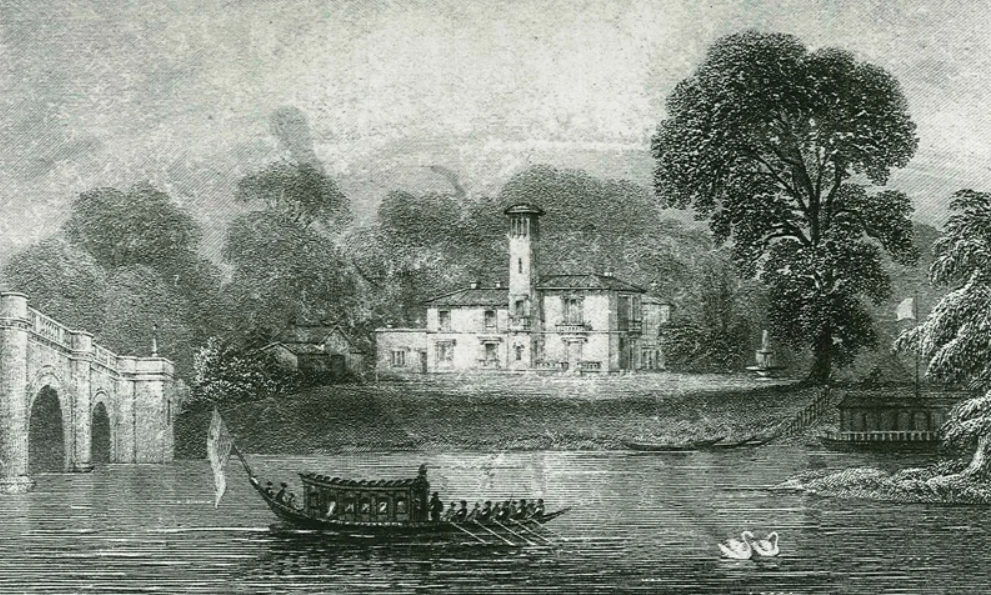
- Early 19th-century engraving of Willoughby House
- Interactive map of the Willoughby House area

General information
- Type: Offices, originally residential
- Location: London, England
- Coordinates: 51°27′24″N 0°18′33″W

Design and construction
- Architect: Leonard Wild Lloyd

Listed Building – Grade II
- Official name: Willoughby House
- Designated: 02 September 1952
- Reference no.: 1080820

Willoughby House is Grade II listed building on Willoughby Road in the East Twickenham area of London.

== Description ==
The house was built in the early 19th-century to designs by Leonard Wild Lloyd. It was originally known as Caen Lodge and then Bertie Lodge. It was converted into offices by Manning Clamp & Partners in 1981.

The building is built in an Italianate style, featuring a campanile tower. It previously overlooked the river, but a mansion block has since been built between.

== See also ==
- Ryde House
- Bute Lodge
