= View of Richmond Hill and Bridge =

Painting by J. M. W. Turner

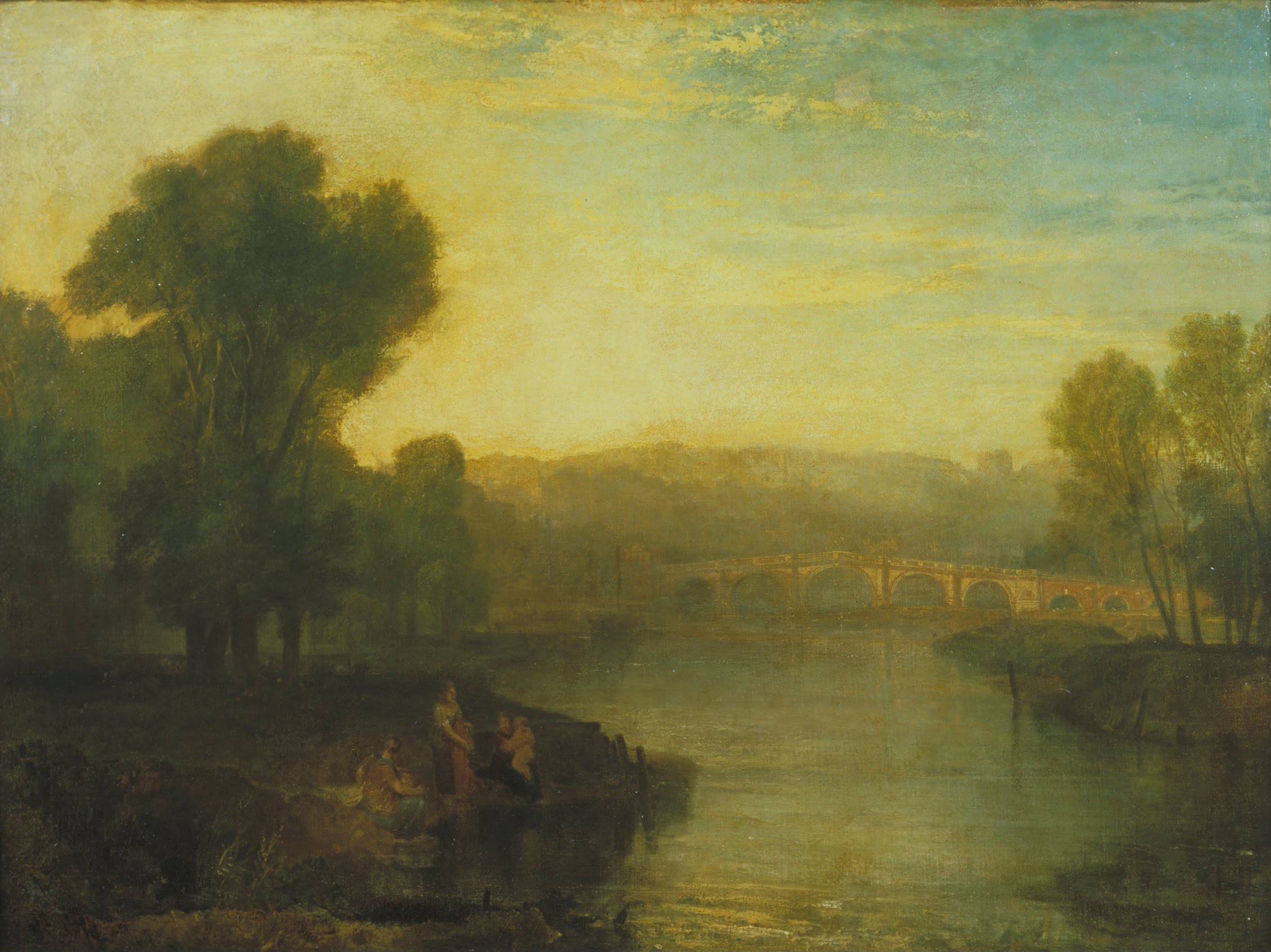
- Artist: J. M. W. Turner
- Year: 1808
- Type: Oil on canvas, landscape
- Dimensions: 91.4 cm × 121.9 cm (36.0 in × 48.0 in)
- Location: Tate Britain, London
- Website: www.tate.org.uk/...n00557

View of Richmond Hill and Bridge is an 1808 landscape painting by the British artist Joseph Mallord William Turner. It depicts a view of Richmond Bridge in Surrey, then some miles outside London. In the distance is Richmond Hill. A few years later Turner designed and lived in Sandycombe Lodge in nearby Twickenham.

Turner presents it as a pastoral scene with bright sunshine and bathing women and grazing sheep despite the presence of the substantial nearby settlement of Richmond. Edwin Landseer saw the painting in Turner's studio in 1808 and reviewed it. It is now in the collection of the Tate Britain in Pimlico, having been part of the Turner bequest of 1856.

It was the first work of Turner's collected by John Ruskin and his father.

== See also ==
- List of paintings by J. M. W. Turner

== Bibliography ==
- Ackroyd, Peter. J.M.W. Turner. Random House, 2006.
- Brown, David Blayney. Turner: In the Tate Collection. Harry N. Abrams, 2002.
- Hamilton, James. Turner - A Life. Sceptre, 1998.
- Reynolds, Graham. Turner. Thames & Hudson, 2022.
- Schneer, Jonathan. The Thames: England's River. Hachette 2015.
