= Learning Schools Trust =

The Learning Schools Trust (LST) was a charitable trust which operated Kunskapsskolan sponsored academy schools in the United Kingdom between 2010 and 2016. LST operated four academy schools in England: Hampton Academy and Twickenham Academy in the London Borough of Richmond upon Thames, Ipswich Academy in Ipswich, Suffolk, and the Elizabeth Woodville School (EWS) in Northamptonshire.

== History ==
LST was incorporated in February 2010 when it took over the running of its first three schools. The Elizabeth Woodville School became an LST Academy on 1 December 2012.

In March 2014 the trust was one of 14 organisations prevented from taking on new schools. The following year, the Department for Education removed Ipswich Academy from LST's trusteeship. Hampton Academy and Twickenham Academy both left the Learning Schools Trust at the end of the 2015 school year. The trust ceased operation in 2016 and was dissolved in 2020.
