= Whitton Park =

Coordinates: 51°27′23.55″N 0°21′52.9″W

Whitton Park was a country house in the village of Whitton in Twickenham, Middlesex. It was demolished in the 1840s and gradually replaced with housing.

== Early history ==
In 1625 two parcels of land were enclosed from Hounslow Heath and by 1635 the land included a substantial house.

== Georgian estate ==
In 1722 the estate passed to Archibald Campbell, Lord Ilay, later the 3rd Duke of Argyll. He went on to expand and develop it. He died in 1761, and a large part of the estate was bought around 1766 by George Gostling, a lawyer. Whitton Park then remained in the Gostling family to 1892. In 1735, architect and builder Roger Morris designed and built a Palladian villa there; and it was later leased by Sir William Chambers. Chambers had also bought into the Duke's estate, and developed land from it. Benjamin Hobhouse leased the house from 1809 to 1821. Whitton Park came to mean the house, and Whitton Place the villa, which was demolished in 1847.

Whitton Park was known for its gardens, with winding paths and groves leading past allegorical urns and temples. The Duke was an enthusiastic gardener and he imported large numbers of exotic species of plants and trees for his estate. He was nicknamed the 'Treemonger' by Horace Walpole. On his death, many of these, including mature trees, were moved by his nephew, John Stuart, 3rd Earl of Bute, to the Princess of Wales' new garden at Kew. This later became Kew Gardens and one of these trees planted in 1762 still survives to this day; the black locust.

Designed by architect James Gibbs, the Whitton Park greenhouse was built in 1725. It functioned also as an aviary. Later converted to a mansion, it was demolished 1912. Gibbs's 1728 Book of Architecture included designs for three further buildings proposed for Whitton Park, but never executed. The greenhouse stood at the northern end of an artificial canal which was situated near the centre of the main enclosure. At the southern end of this canal was a triangular gothick tower with angle turrets, for which Gibbs may also have been the architect.

== Later development ==
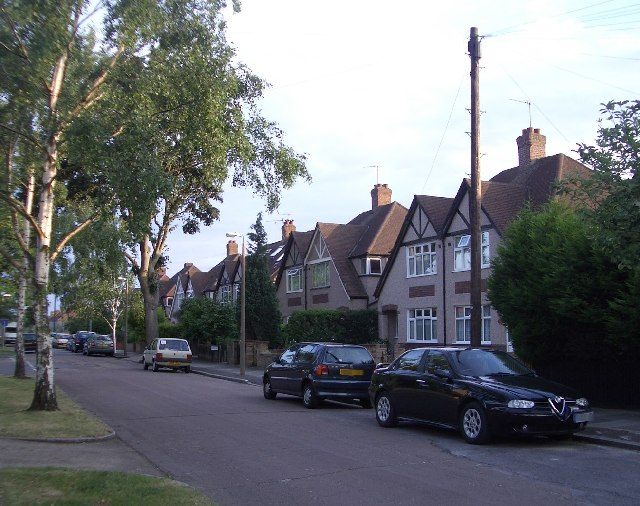
1930s houses on "Whitton Park"

Most of the Whitton Park site was developed for housing around 1935.
