= Ryde House =

House in London, England

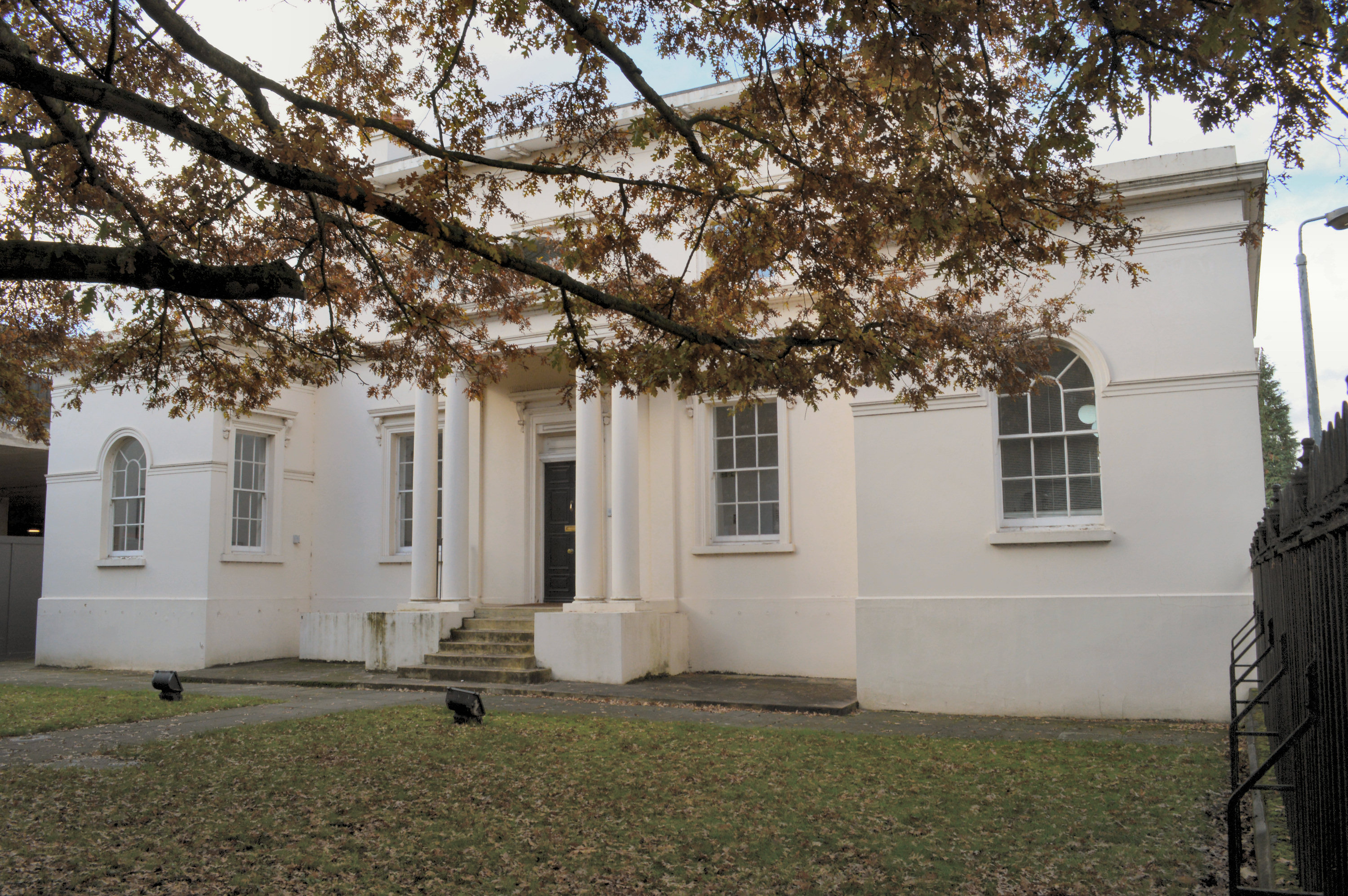
- Interactive map of the Ryde House area

General information
- Type: Residential
- Location: London, England
- Coordinates: 51°27′22″N 0°18′36″W

Design and construction
- Architect: Leonard Wild Lloyd

Listed Building – Grade II
- Official name: Ryde House
- Designated: 21 June 1971
- Reference no.: 1250207

Ryde House is Grade II listed building on Richmond Road in the East Twickenham area of London.

== Description ==
Ryde House was built c. 1830 to designs by Leonard Wild Lloyd. It was one of many large villas and houses along Richmond Road put up around that time, of which only few survive. The building was originally known simply by its address No. 3 Richmond Road. In the 1860s however a jeweller, Samuel Oliver Pierce, moved from a house in Kilburn named Ryde Lodge, which would transfer to the knew house, eventually changing to its current name. Architect George Wilkinson spent his last years in the house, dying there in 1898. The house was redeveloped by Thomas Saunders in 1979.

== See also ==
- Willoughby House, Twickenham
- Bute Lodge
