= Thames Valley Grammar School =

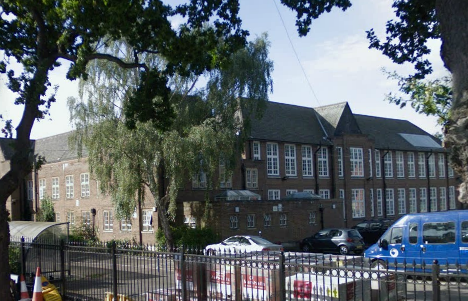

Location
- Fifth Cross Road; Twickenham, Middlesex, TW2 5LH; England; 51.4395°N 0.3508°W

Information
- Founded: 1928
- Status: closed
- Closed: 1977
- Local authority: London Borough of Richmond upon Thames
- Headmaster: Harold Willoighby Bligh, Dr Mortimer
- Gender: mixed
- Education system: Grammar

Thames Valley Grammar School was a co-educational grammar school in Twickenham, London Borough of Richmond upon Thames, England.

== History ==
Thames Valley Grammar School was opened in 1928 under one of the youngest headmasters in the country, Mr Harold Willoughby Bligh (1895 to 1969). Initially conceived as a boys school, unusually for the time it opened, and remained, as a co-educational establishment. Bligh remained at the school until his retirement in 1960, succeeded by Dr. Mortimer who, in turn, remained at the school until its closure.

Its final secondary intake was in 1972 and from 1973 it gradually changed into a sixth-form college; Thames Valley Sixth Form College.

In 1977, the college merged with the Shene College and Twickenham Technical College at the Technical College site in Egerton Road to become Richmond upon Thames College. The Thames Valley site became home for Kneller Girls' School in 1978, which merged on the same site with Twickenham County School for Girls in 1980 to become Waldegrave School for Girls.

== Notable alumni ==
=== Thames Valley County Grammar School ===
- Dave Cousins, musician
- Leslie Crowther CBE, television host
- Sir Ian Gainsford, dental surgeon, at King's College London School of Medicine and Dentistry, and President from 1973 to 1974 of the British Society for Restorative Dentistry
- Raimund Herincx, bass-baritone
- Tony Hooper, musician
- Stephen Lambert, television executive
- Professor Sir John Savill, Vice Principal of the University of Edinburgh, Chief Executive Medical Research Council
