= BusinessLDN =

Non-profit membership organization for conducting business campaigning

- Formation: 1992
- Headquarters: London
- Chief Executive: John Dickie
- Website: https://www.businessldn.co.uk/

BusinessLDN (spoken as Business London) is a not for profit advocacy group with a membership composed of leaders of businesses in London, United Kingdom.

As of 2025, it represents around 170 London based businesses.

Its stated aim is "to make London the best city in the world in which to do business".

== History ==
BusinessLDN, formerly known as London First, was established in 1992 to meet a perceived lack of a unitary body to promote London after the dissolution of the Greater London Council. Its founding chair was Allen Sheppard, Baron Sheppard of Didgemere.

Over the following decades, the organisation played a prominent role in shaping London's infrastructure and economic agenda. It supported major transport initiatives, including Crossrail, airport expansion and ensuring HS2 reaches Euston, and advocated for policies to enhance the capital's global competitiveness. It was also instrumental in creating the executive office of the Mayor of London, Transport for London and other Mayoral agencies.

In July 2022, the organisation rebranded as BusinessLDN to reflect its evolving mission and broader UK-wide engagement. The rebrand marked its 30th anniversary and was accompanied by a refreshed strategy. The new identity emphasised BusinessLDN's role in convening cross-sector collaboration, influencing policy, and driving inclusive growth.

Today BusinessLDN continues to work with business, government and civic leaders to shape a more prosperous and sustainable future for London and the UK.

== Leadership ==
John Dickie was appointed chief executive in May 2021. Its former chief executives were Jasmine Whitbread and Baroness Jo Valentine.

=== Leadership Team ===
Sources:

- John Dickie - Chief Executive
- Muniya Barua - Deputy Chief Executive
- Eddie Curzon - Chief Commercial Officer

=== Board ===
Sir Kenneth Olisa succeeded Paul Drechsler CBE as Chair in 2023.

== Rebranding ==
On 12 July 2022, London First renamed as BusinessLDN (spoken as Business London).
