= Jasmine Whitbread =

British businesswoman

- Born: Jasmine Mary Whitbread; 1 September 1963 (age 63); London, England
- Citizenship: United Kingdom and Switzerland
- Education: Kneller Girls' School
- Alma mater: University of Bristol
- Occupation: Businesswoman
- Title: Chair, Travis Perkins
- Term: 2021-
- Spouse: Howard Exton-Smith (m. 1994)
- Children: 2

Jasmine Mary Whitbread (born 1 September 1963) is a British businesswoman, and the chair of Travis Perkins since 2021.

From 2016 to 2021, she was the chief executive of London First, an independent non-profit organisation whose mission is to make London the best city in the world to do business. She was CEO of Save the Children from 2005 until 2015; firstly leading Save the Children UK and in 2010, creating Save the Children International.

== Early life and education ==
Whitbread was born in London on 1 September 1963. Her mother, Ursula Whitbread, is Swiss and her father, Gerald Whitbread, is English. She was educated at Kneller Girls' School, then an all-girls comprehensive school in Twickenham, London. In 1986, she graduated from the University of Bristol with a bachelor's degree in English.

She later returned to university study. In 1998, she completed the executive program at the Graduate School of Business, Stanford University.

== Career ==
Whitbread began her career in marketing. From 1986 to 1988, she was a marketing manager at Rio Tinto Computer Services. She then moved to the United States and was director of global marketing at Cortex Corporation. From 1990 to 1992, she was in Uganda with the Voluntary Service Overseas as a management trainer at the National Union of Disabled Persons of Uganda. From 1994 to 1999, she was a managing director of Thomson Financial (now Thomson Reuters).

She then joined Oxfam GB, where she was regional director for West Africa from 1999 to 2002, then international director from 2002 to 2005. In 2005, she joined Save the Children UK as chief executive officer (CEO); she was the first woman to head the charity. After five years, she was appointed CEO of Save the Children International. She stepped down from the role on 31 December 2015. In December 2016, she became the chief executive of London First.

On 19 January 2011, Whitbread was appointed to the board of BT as a non-executive director, where she is a member of the Committee for Sustainable and Responsible Business and the Audit and Risk Committee. On 1 April 2015, she was appointed an independent non-executive director of Standard Chartered where she chairs the Brand, Values and Conduct Committee. She has served on the United Nations Commission on Life-Saving Commodities, which was jointly chaired by Goodluck Jonathan and Jens Stoltenberg, and issued recommendations to increase access to and use of 13 essential commodities for women’s and children’s health.

In August 2019 she was appointed a non-executive director at WPP plc effective from 1 September 2019 serving as a member of the Compensation Committee.

Whitbread regularly blogged for the Financial Times during the annual World Economics Forum in Davos. In 2013, she featured in the CNN Leading Women series. Acting as an ambassador for women in leadership, Whitbread spoke on the Evening Standard's panel debate with Cherie Booth QC, in 2012.

== Personal life ==
In 1994, Whitbread married Howard Exton-Smith. Together, they have two children.

Whitbread holds British/Swiss dual nationality.

== Honours ==
In 2013, Whitbread was named one of the UK’s 100 most powerful women by BBC Radio 4's Woman's Hour. In January 2014, she was awarded an honorary doctorate by the University of Bristol.
