= St Edmund of Canterbury, Whitton =

Coordinates: 51.4526°N 0.3621°W

- Roman Catholic Church of St Edmund of Canterbury, Whitton Parish, Twickenham
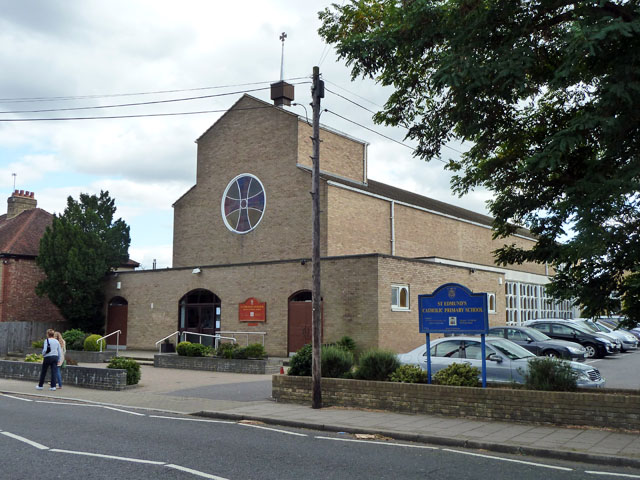
- St Edmund of Canterbury, Whitton
- Location: St Edmund's Lane, 213 Nelson Road, Whitton TW2 7BB
- Country: England
- Denomination: Roman Catholic
- Website: https://parish.rcdow.org.uk/whitton

History
- Founded: 1934 (parish); 1935 (original church)
- Founder: The Edmundite Fathers (Society of Saint Edmund)
- Dedication: St Edmund of Canterbury (1175–1240)
- Consecrated: 19 September 1972

Architecture
- Architect(s): F. X. Velarde; completed by Richard O'Mahony for the F. X. Velarde Partnership
- Years built: 1961-63
- Groundbreaking: 19 May 1962 (foundation stone)

Specifications
- Materials: Reinforced concrete frame beneath an exterior of light golden rustic bricks

Administration
- Diocese: Roman Catholic Diocese of Westminster
- Deanery: Upper Thames
- Parish: Whitton

Clergy
- Priest: Rev Jonathan Stogdon

The Catholic Church of St Edmund of Canterbury is a Roman Catholic church in Nelson Road, Whitton, Richmond-upon-Thames, London. It is part of the Upper Thames Deanery of the Diocese of Westminster. It is dedicated to Edmund Rich (also known as Saint Edmund or Eadmund of Canterbury, and as Saint Edmund of Abingdon) (1175–1240), who was a 13th-century Archbishop of Canterbury.

The congregation was established by the Edmundite Fathers, who acquired land in 1934 and converted existing structures on the property into a chapel for worship. A permanent church was built in 1937 but destroyed by German bombing on 29 October 1940, during the Blitz. The current church was completed in 1963 and consecrated in 1972.

In 1988, the Edmundites withdrew to the United States, and the parish has since been staffed by diocesan clergy.

== Building ==
The current church building, constructed between 1961 and 1963, to replace the original building dating from 1935, was designed by F. X. Velarde and completed for the F. X. Velarde Partnership by Richard O'Mahony.

The aumbry for oils is by David John, but the font by the same designer is no longer there.

== Services ==
Mass is held every morning and also on Saturday and Sunday evenings.

== Communications ==
The church publishes a weekly newsletter, St Edmund's Chronicle.
