= Alexander Tweedie =

Scottish physician and writer

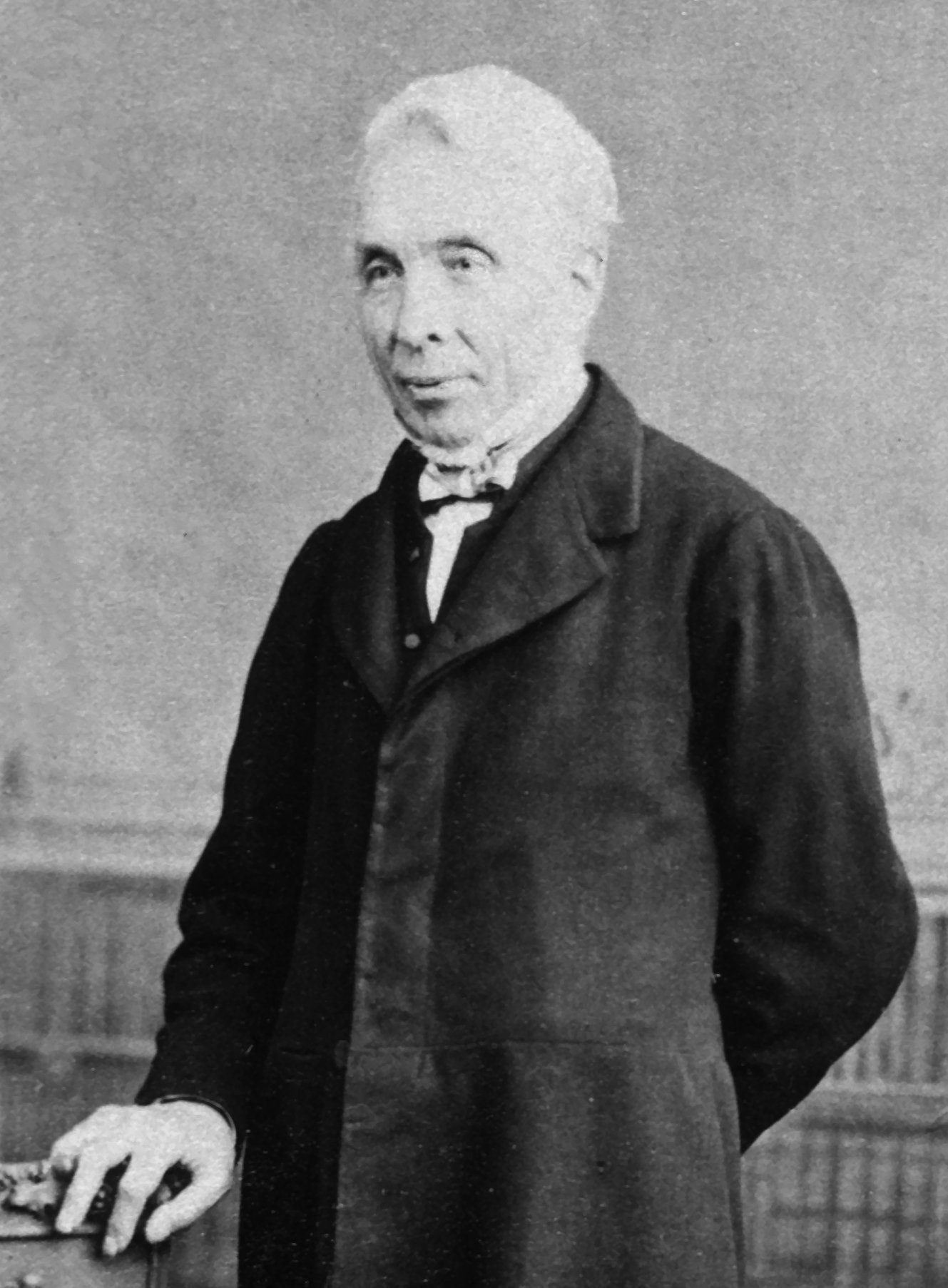

Dr Alexander Tweedie FRS (29 August 1794 – 30 May 1884) was a Scottish physician and writer.

== Life ==
He was born in Edinburgh on 29 August 1794, and received his early education at the Royal High School there. In 1809 he began medical studies at the University of Edinburgh, and at about the same time became a pupil of a surgeon to the Edinburgh Royal Infirmary, John Henry Wishart. On 1 August 1815 Tweedie took the degree of M.D., and in 1817 became a fellow of the Royal College of Surgeons of Edinburgh. He was then living at 16 Nicolson Street in Edinburgh's South Side.

Tweedie was elected one of the two house-surgeons to the Royal Infirmary, Robert Liston being the other. In 1818 Tweedie went into practice in Edinburgh, with the intention of becoming a specialist in ophthalmic surgery; but in 1820 he moved to London, took a residence in Ely Place, and on 25 June 1822 was admitted a licentiate of the College of Physicians. He became a fellow of the college on 4 July 1838, was conciliarius in 1853, 1854, and 1855, and Lumleian Lecturer in 1858 and 1859. In 1866 he was elected an honorary fellow of the King's and Queen's College of Physicians in Ireland.

In 1822 Tweedie was appointed assistant physician to the London Fever Hospital, and in 1824, on the retirement of John Armstrong, filled the post of physician to the hospital, which he held for 38 years. He resigned it in 1861, when he was appointed consulting physician and one of the vice-presidents. In 1836 he was elected physician to the Foundling Hospital; he was also physician to the Standard Assurance Company, examiner in medicine at the University of London, and was an honorary member of the Medical Psychological Association.

Tweedie was elected a Fellow of the Royal Society on 8 February 1838. He died at his residence, Bute Lodge, Twickenham, on 30 May 1884, continuing to practise at the age of 89 years.

== Works ==
Tweedie was a voluminous writer. He was joint-author with Charles Gaselee of A Practical Treatise on Cholera (1832), and was the original planner of the Cyclopædia of Practical Medicine (London, 1831–5, 4 vols.), of which he was one of the editors. He planned and edited the Library of Medicine, in eight volumes, which appeared in 1840–42; and was the author of Clinical Illustrations of Fever (London, 1828), and of Lectures on the Distinctive Characters, Pathology, and Treatment of Continued Fevers (1862).
