= St Catherine's School, Twickenham =

St Catherine's School

Location
- Cross Deep; Twickenham, TW1 4QJ; England
- Coordinates: 51°26′35″N 0°19′50″W

Information
- Type: Private day school
- Motto: Latin: Non Verba Sed Facta "Not Words, but Deeds"
- Religious affiliation: Roman Catholic
- Established: 1914
- Founders: Sisters of Mercy
- Local authority: Richmond upon Thames
- Department for Education URN: 102936 Tables
- Chair of Governors: Edward Sparrow
- Headmistress: Johneen McPherson
- Gender: Girls
- Age: 3 to 18
- Enrolment: 430
- Colour: Blue
- Website: http://www.stcatherineschool.co.uk/

St Catherine's School is a Catholic private school for girls in Twickenham, London. The school is next to the River Thames and about two-thirds of a mile (1.1 km) from both Strawberry Hill and Twickenham railway stations.

== History ==
Founded in a large house near Twickenham Green, St Catherine's then moved to Orford Lodge (now demolished) and in 1919 to Pope's Villa, on the site of Alexander Pope's original villa. By 1961 it was recognised by the Ministry of Education as a grammar school. In 1948 the school bought a house on Cross Deep known as The Lawn, where it is currently located.

Up until 1991 the school was home to a number of Sisters who were also members of the staff. They moved out and the school became a charitable trust managed by lay persons in 1992. It is the only independent Roman Catholic girls' school in the Richmond area and is within the Archdiocese of Westminster. It remains a Roman Catholic foundation but takes students of all religious affiliations. It has a preparatory school (entry typically at three-years-old) and a senior school (entry at eleven-years-old).

== Notable former pupils ==
- Annie Nightingale (1940-2024) - radio and television broadcaster
- Bonnie Langford (b. 1964) - actress
- Patsy Kensit (b. 1968) - actress
- Olivia Hallinan (b. 1986) - actress

== See also ==
- List of schools in Twickenham
