= Greenwich judgment =

UK court judgment

The Greenwich judgment of 1990 declared as unlawful a decision by the local education authority (LEA) of the London Borough of Greenwich to give priority in school admissions to its own residents over residents from neighbouring LEAs, clarifying that applicants must be treated equally, whether they reside inside or outside the authority. It has been associated with a decline in the use of catchment areas as a means of managing school admissions, and an associated increase in cross-border mobility.

== History ==
The Greenwich Council policy on admissions had been formed in the context of the dissolution of the Inner London Education Authority, and was similar to established LEA policies used in other parts of the country. However, following complaints from parents and school leaders in neighbouring Lewisham, the policy was judged to be in breach of section 6(5) of the Education Act 1980. This set a precedent in UK law, establishing that maintained schools may not give admissions priority to children for the sole reason that they live within the LEA's administrative boundaries. The judgment was later codified in section 86(8)(a) of the School Standards and Framework Act 1998 and also in the National Admissions Code.

The Rotherham judgment (1997) later established that the principle of admission authorities operating catchment areas as part of their over-subscription criteria in allocating school places was lawful provided that in so doing authorities are not in breach of the Greenwich judgment. Parental preference was confirmed to have primacy, so that applicants from outside of a school's catchment area, who express a preference for that school, should be prioritised over applicants within the catchment area who express no preference.

== Interpretation and mitigation ==
Despite the Greenwich judgment, catchment areas can be wholly contained within administrative boundaries, and even coincide with administrative boundaries, provided the area is clearly defined and there is some additional justification for the choice of area that is considered reasonable, such as distance from the school or ease of access. Catchment area boundaries may align with postcode areas or roads, and these sometimes coincide with administrative boundaries. Some faith schools have catchment areas that are aligned with diocesan boundaries or deaneries which follow the local authority's boundaries, and these have been deemed not in breach of the Greenwich judgment provided that faith criteria are also applied. Some grammar schools, community schools and academies which have historically aligned their catchments with administrative boundaries, have been able to sustain their arrangements in spite of the Greenwich judgment. More recently there have been local authorities who have set up new catchment areas coinciding with their borough boundary, and these have been judged to be acceptable by the Schools Adjudicator. Catchment area boundaries, in common with other over-subscription criteria used in admissions policies, must not unfairly disadvantage children from particular social or racial groups.

A number of local authorities wishing to reduce the impact of the Greenwich judgment have abandoned catchment areas in favour of nodal points (or admissions points), which are the equivalent of defining the centres of catchment areas but with no outer borders. There are also schools which use a single point on the borough boundary to define the radius of a circular catchment area.

== Opposition ==
Some local authorities have found that the increase in cross-border movement associated with the Greenwich judgment makes it more difficult for them to fulfil their statutory duty to ensure all children within their area are offered a school place. It also removed from LEAs one means of helping local families to secure places at local schools of their choice. The Liberal Democrats have attempted to persuade the UK Parliament that the Greenwich judgment should be overturned, due to perceived negative effects on school admissions patterns in some local authorities. Kingston upon Thames Council has also attempted to overturn the judgment via the Local Government Association. Bromley Council challenged the Greenwich judgment in the High Court and House of Lords but was unsuccessful. Manchester City Council also expressed its disappointment with the Greenwich judgment after its ten-year old admissions policy was found to be in breach of it in 2015.
