= Waldegrave School =

Location
- Fifth Cross Road; Twickenham, Greater London, TW2 5LH; England; 51°26′22″N 0°21′03″W

Information
- Type: Academy; Comprehensive school
- Motto: Enjoy, Achieve, Empower
- Established: 1980 (current school); 1909; 1936
- Department for Education URN: 138461 Tables
- Ofsted: Reports
- Head teacher: Elizabeth Tongue
- Gender: Girls; Coed (Sixth Form)
- Age: 11 to 18
- Enrolment: 1471 (2024)
- Houses: Pankhurst, Eliot, Franklin and Seacole
- Colour: Royal blue
- Former location of: Thames Valley Grammar School
- Website: http://www.waldegrave.richmond.sch.uk

Waldegrave School is a comprehensive secondary school with academy status in Twickenham, London, England. It takes girls between the ages of 11 and 16 and has a coeducational sixth form, opened in September 2014. There are four houses and each house is named after prominent women: (Mary) Seacole, (Emmeline) Pankhurst, (George) Eliot and (Rosalind) Franklin.

== Description ==
Waldegrave School converted to academy status in 2012, having previously been part of the Richmond upon Thames LEA.

The Headteacher is Elizabeth Tongue, who replaced Philippa Nunn in January 2019. Mrs Nunn held the post from 2006 when she succeeded Heather Flint.

Waldegrave was a Beacon School from 1999 and became involved in a Leading Edge Partnership with Grey Court School in 2004. It was also awarded specialist Science College status in September 2004, and continues to specialise in science today. It is the only state-maintained girls' school (ages 11 to 16) in the borough. In 2014 it opened a co-educational 6th form with approximately 140 students in each year.

== Academic performance ==
As with other schools, latest exam results and related data are published in the Department for Education's national tables.

In 2010 Waldegrave was named the top state secondary school, without a sixth form, in the country, by The Times Parent Power and again in 2012, 2013, 2014 and 2015. This is a survey based on the % of A and A* grades achieved by students. In 2016, it was named Comprehensive School of the year by the Sunday Times Schools Guide in recognition of its consistently good GCSE results and the high standard of results for its first A level cohort.

In 2008, Waldegrave was reported to have received a higher proportion of fraudulent applications than for other secondary schools in the London Borough of Richmond upon Thames.

== History ==
Waldegrave School was formed in 1980 by the merger of two girls' schools – Twickenham Girls' School and Kneller Girls' School – on its present-day site. Its name commemorates Frances Lady Waldegrave, a former local resident of Strawberry Hill House.

=== Twickenham County School for Girls ===
Twickenham County School for Girls opened in 1909, later known as the all-girls Twickenham County Grammar School or the Cowsheds. With the end of selective grammar education in the borough in 1972, the school became a comprehensive known as Twickenham Girls' School in 1973.

Ruth Kirkley (1935 – 21 July 2009), headteacher from 1977, continued as the first headteacher of Waldegrave school until 1991.

The site of Twickenham Girls' School is now the St Richard Reynolds RC College 51.4475°N 0.3342°W

=== Kneller Girls' School ===
Kneller Girls' School opened in 1936 at the railway end of the Meadway site shared with the mirror building, but initially completely segregated, Kneller Boys' School. The building was augmented by huts following the raising of school leaving age to 15 after the Education Act 1944.

The schools merged as Kneller Secondary Modern School before 1959 when the boys moved to what is now Twickenham Academy in Whitton, and the school reverted to all-girls and its original name. The girls' numbers were increased with the transfer of secondary school age girls from the Stanley Road school. In 1978 the school relocated to the site in Fifth Cross Road. (The Fifth Cross Road site had previously been occupied since 1928 by the Thames Valley Grammar School which became a Sixth Form College in 1973 and had closed in 1977 with the formation of Richmond upon Thames College).

The former Kneller school site in Meadway is now a residential estate. 51.4478°N 0.3516°W

== Notable former pupils ==
=== Waldegrave School ===
- Anna Calvi, singer songwriter
- Kelly Marcel, screenwriter
- Rosie Marcel, actress
- Anna Vakili, TV personality

=== Twickenham Girls' School ===
- Caroline Flint, Labour MP for Don Valley since 1997

=== Kneller Girls' School ===
- Jasmine Whitbread, CEO of Save the Children International
- Saimo Chahal, human rights lawyer

=== Twickenham County Grammar School ===
- Margaret Bourne OBE, chairman from 1992 to 2001 of CORDA
- Julie Girling, Conservative MEP for South West England 2009-2019
- Dianne Jackson, animator, director of The Snowman
- Valerie Vaz, British Labour Party politician and solicitor.

== In popular culture ==
The school buildings appeared in the 1989 film Shirley Valentine starring Pauline Collins. It was also used in the series Goggle-Eyes adapted for television by the BBC as a four-episode mini-series, which was broadcast in 1993. The school was also featured in a short section of Before I go to Sleep (2014) starring Nicole Kidman and Colin Firth.
