= Whitton Methodist Church =

Former church in Whitton, London

- Whitton Methodist Church
- 51°26′41.0″N 0°21′43.5″W
- Location: Percy Road, Whitton TW2 6JL
- Country: England
- Denomination: Methodist

History
- Founded: 1938

Administration
- Diocese: Richmond and Hounslow Methodist Circuit

Whitton Methodist Church was a Methodist church on Percy Road, Whitton in the London Borough of Richmond upon Thames.

A hall at the church was badly damaged in a fire on 13 September 2015.

The church held its last service on 18 July 2021.
