= St Augustine's, Whitton =

Coordinates: 51.44345°N 0.3645°W

- Church of St Augustine of Canterbury, Whitton
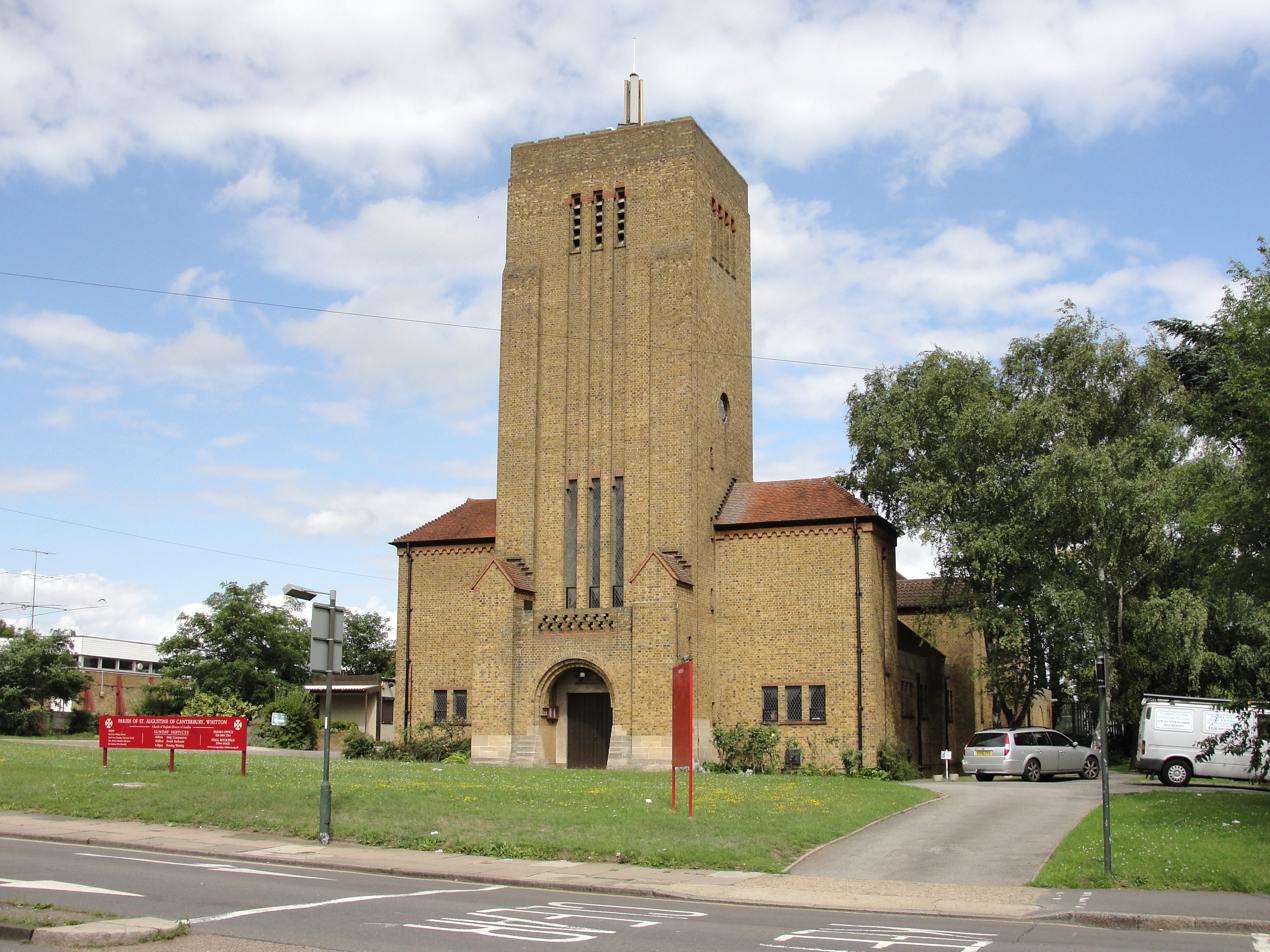
- The church in 2009
- St Augustine's, Whitton
- Location: Hospital Bridge Road, Whitton, London TW2 6DE
- Country: England
- Denomination: Church of England
- Website: www.st-augustine-of-canterbury-whitton.org

History
- Founded: 1935
- Dedication: St Augustine of Canterbury

Architecture
- Years built: 1958

Administration
- Diocese: LONDON
- Archdeaconry: Middlesex
- Deanery: Hampton

Clergy
- Priest: The Revd Helen Calner (inducted 22 July 2025)

St Augustine's, Whitton, on Hospital Bridge Road in Whitton in the London Borough of Richmond upon Thames, is a Church of England church in the Diocese of London. Its minister is The Revd Helen Calner

== History ==
The church was founded in 1935 and met, until 1958, at Bishop Perrin's School.
