= Borough Cemetery =

Cemetery in London Borough of Richmond upon Thames

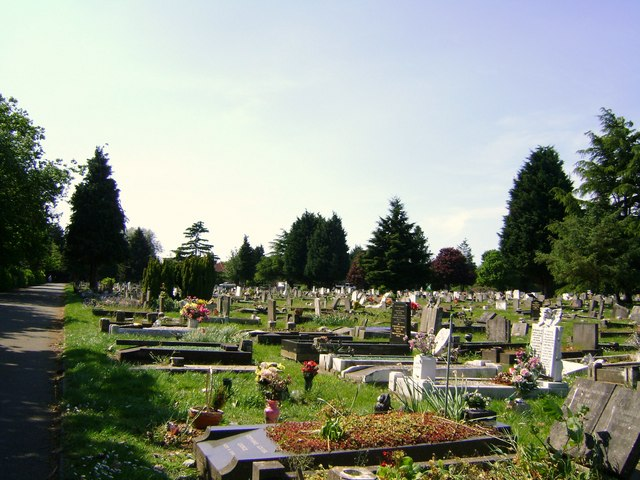
- Borough Cemetery
- Interactive map of Borough Cemetery

Details
- Established: 1942
- Location: Powder Mill Lane, Heathfield, London Borough of Richmond upon Thames, TW2 6EJ
- Country: England
- Coordinates: 51.4490°N 0.3740°W
- Type: Public
- Owned by: London Borough of Hounslow
- Size: 10 acres (4.0 ha)
- Website: Official website
- Find a Grave: Borough Cemetery

Borough Cemetery is a cemetery in Powder Mill Lane, Heathfield in the London Borough of Richmond upon Thames, though owned and operated by neighbouring Hounslow Council. It was established in 1942 in what was then the Municipal Borough of Heston and Isleworth and was originally called Heston and Isleworth Cemetery.

A 2011 audit of London burial provision reported that Borough Cemetery had 8.9 ha of reserved burial land. However, more recent documents indicate that it has 1.2 ha of reserved burial land.
