= Sandycombe Lodge =

Historic house museum in England

Coordinates: 51°27′14″N 0°18′59″W

- Solus Lodge
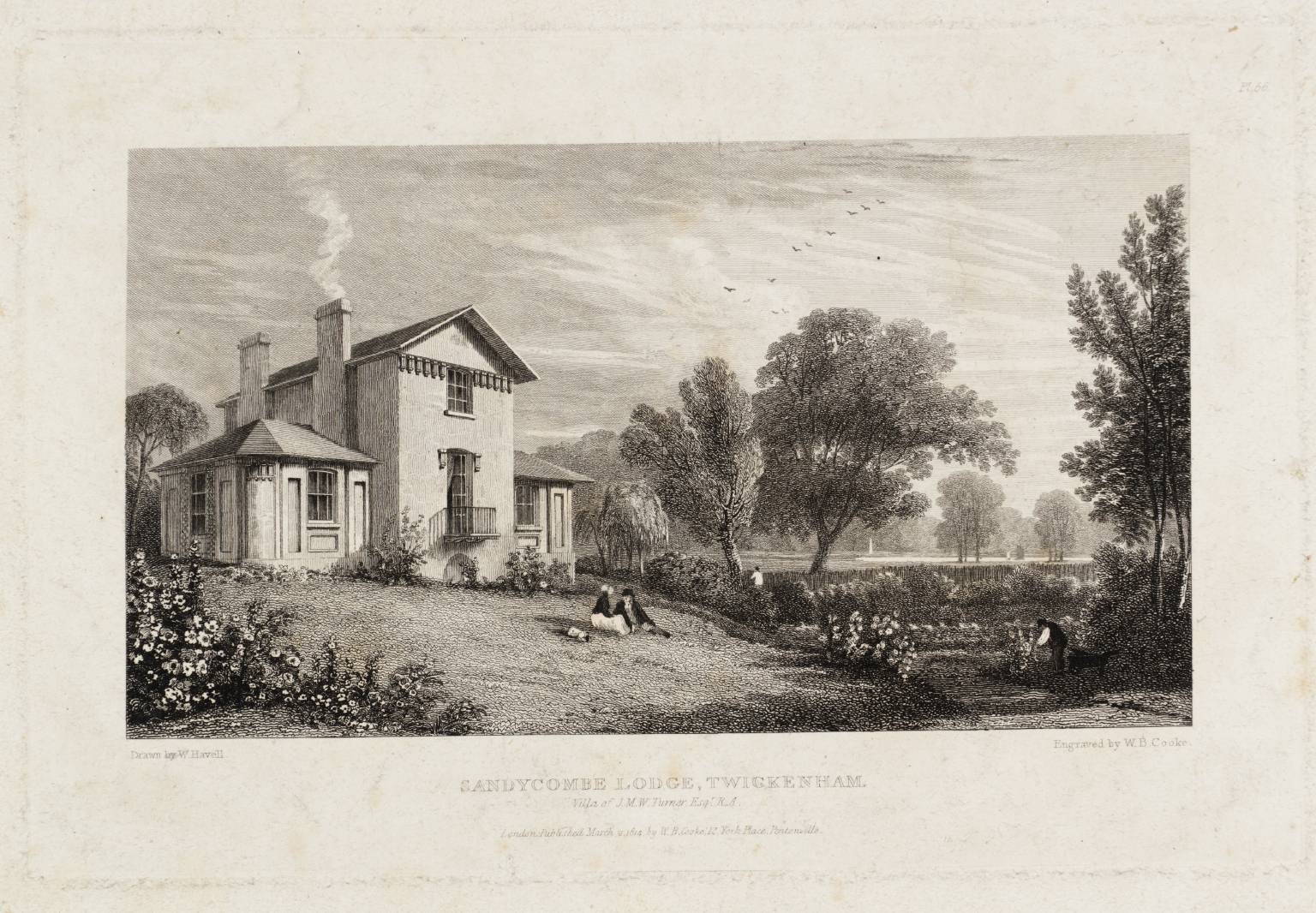
- Sandycombe Lodge in 1814
- Interactive map of Sandycombe Lodge
- Location: 40 Sandycoombe Road, Twickenham TW1 2LR, London Borough of Richmond upon Thames

History
- Built: 1813
- Built for: J. M. W. Turner and his father William Turner

Site notes
- Architect: J. M. W. Turner
- Architectural style: Picturesque-cottage style
- Governing body: Turner's House Trust

Listed Building – Grade II*
- Official name: Sandycombe Lodge
- Designated: 2 September 1952
- Reference no.: 1262429

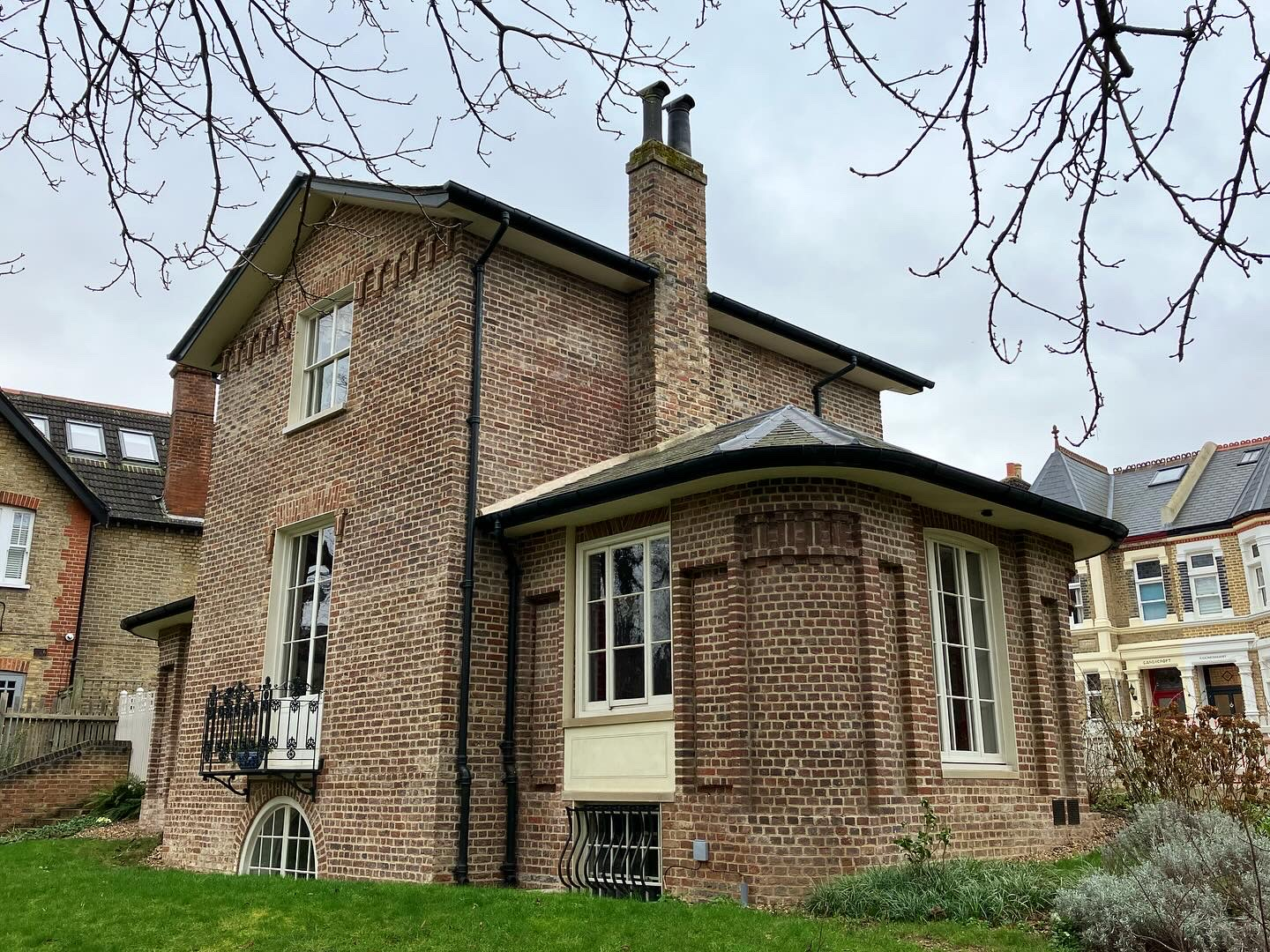
Sandycombe Lodge in 2024

Sandycombe Lodge is a Grade II* listed house at 40 Sandycoombe Road, Twickenham, in the London Borough of Richmond upon Thames. (Note: On older maps, the street name is spelt Sandycombe Road; an extra 'o' was added in the later 20th century, probably on the orders of the London Borough of Richmond upon Thames, to distinguish it from another Sandycombe Road in Richmond and Kew.) In the picturesque-cottage style, it was designed and built in 1813 by the artist J. M. W. Turner (1775–1851) as his country retreat and as a home for his father William (1745–1829). Turner lived there from 1814 to 1826. Originally known as Solus Lodge, it is the only surviving building designed by Turner, and shows the influence of his friend Sir John Soane. The appearance of the house had been much altered by the addition of second floors to the original side wings.

When it was built, Twickenham was rural, as can be seen in the engraving Sandycombe Lodge, Twickenham, Villa of J. M. W. Turner (1814) that was engraved by W. B. Cooke after William Havell and is now held at Tate Britain.

Since the sale of Sandycombe Lodge in 1826 by Turner, it has had several owners. The house was used as a factory to produce airmen's uniforms during the Second World War. The vibrations from the heavy machinery caused damage to the staircase and ceilings of the house. The house was bought by Professor Harold Livermore and his wife Ann in 1947, and they created the Sandycombe Lodge Trust (now Turner's House Trust) in 2005. After Livermore's death in 2010, the house was left to the Trust to be preserved as a monument to Turner.

Many of the house's original features survived, but it needed major restoration work and redecoration. Turner's House Trust sought to raise funds to restore the house, remove Victorian additions and return it to its appearance in Turner's day. In January 2015 it was announced that the Trust was to receive a grant of £1.4 million from the Heritage Lottery Fund to enable this work to take place. The year-long renovation, costing £2.4 million, started in March 2016. The restoration of Turner's House is now complete and the house is open to the public; visitors can experience Turner's House as he lived in it, and learn the fascinating stories behind the conservation of this important historic house.

== See also ==
- View of Richmond Hill and Bridge, an 1808 turner painting of nearby Richmond Bridge
