= Twickenham School =

Location
- Percy Road; Whitton; Twickenham, Greater London, TW2 6JW; England; 51.44433°N 0.36316°W

Information
- Type: Academy
- Motto: Aspire, Achieve, Enjoy
- Established: 2016; 10 years ago
- Department for Education URN: 143420 Tables
- Ofsted: Reports
- Headteacher: Jonathon Lisseman
- Gender: Coeducational
- Age: 11 to 16
- Website: http://www.twickenhamschool.org.uk/

Twickenham School, is a co-educational secondary school located in Whitton, in the London Borough of Richmond. It has two predecessor schools: Twickenham Academy and before that Whitton School.

Twickenham School is an academy operated by the Bourne Trust, which operates several other schools, including nearby Hampton High and Teddington School.

== Performance ==
As with other schools, latest exam results and related data are published in the Department for Education's national tables.

== History ==
The first school to be built on the site of Twickenham School was named Whitton School. It was established in 1959, to cater for boys from the former Kneller School and girls from Stanley Road School.

In 2001, a Council report determined that the capacity and general standard of school facilities across the borough was inadequate.

In 2003, plans were put forward for the existing school to be replaced by a Catholic Secondary School, with a new community school to be built on the site of Heathfield School, but these were not progressed. The school was considered for rebuilding under the national BSF programme in 2007, but only one school in the borough could be selected and Teddington School was chosen instead.

Whitton School was later re-built as part of the next Government's sponsored academies programme, becoming Twickenham Academy in 2010, under the governance of the Learning Schools Trust.

Twickenham Academy was closed at the end of October 2016 and was replaced by Twickenham School on the first day of November 2016, under the management of Richmond West Schools Trust. It moved to the larger Bourne Trust in September 2021.

== Notable former pupils ==
=== Whitton School/Twickenham Academy/Twickenham School ===
- Lauren James, footballer
- Luke Plange, footballer
