= Nodal admissions point =

Geographical location, used to specify a school's catchment

A nodal point in UK school admissions over-subscription criteria is a geographical location, used to specify a school's catchment. If a school is oversubscribed, the distance from applicants' homes to the nodal point can be used for prioritising admissions. This can ensure the school not only serves pupils closest to it but also those living in other areas, for example areas that have more limited access to school places. Nodal points are sometimes known as admissions points or centroid points.

The term nodal point is also sometimes used to define a specific location on school premises to which home-school distance will be measured.

== Usage ==
Nodal admissions points are used by some local authorities to mitigate the effects of the Greenwich judgment on their statutory duty to provide sufficient school places for local children. They are also used by schools which are not located within, or near the centre of, the area that they are intended to serve, or by schools which have opened at a temporary location, pending a move to a permanent site. Some schools that are intended to serve a wide area, or several dispersed areas, use transport hubs such as train stations as nodal points. Nodal points have also been used to ensure a mixed socio-economic intake, and put forward as a potential means of resolving school access issues in rural areas.
