= Whitton, London =

Coordinates: 51.4488°N 0.3513°W

Whitton
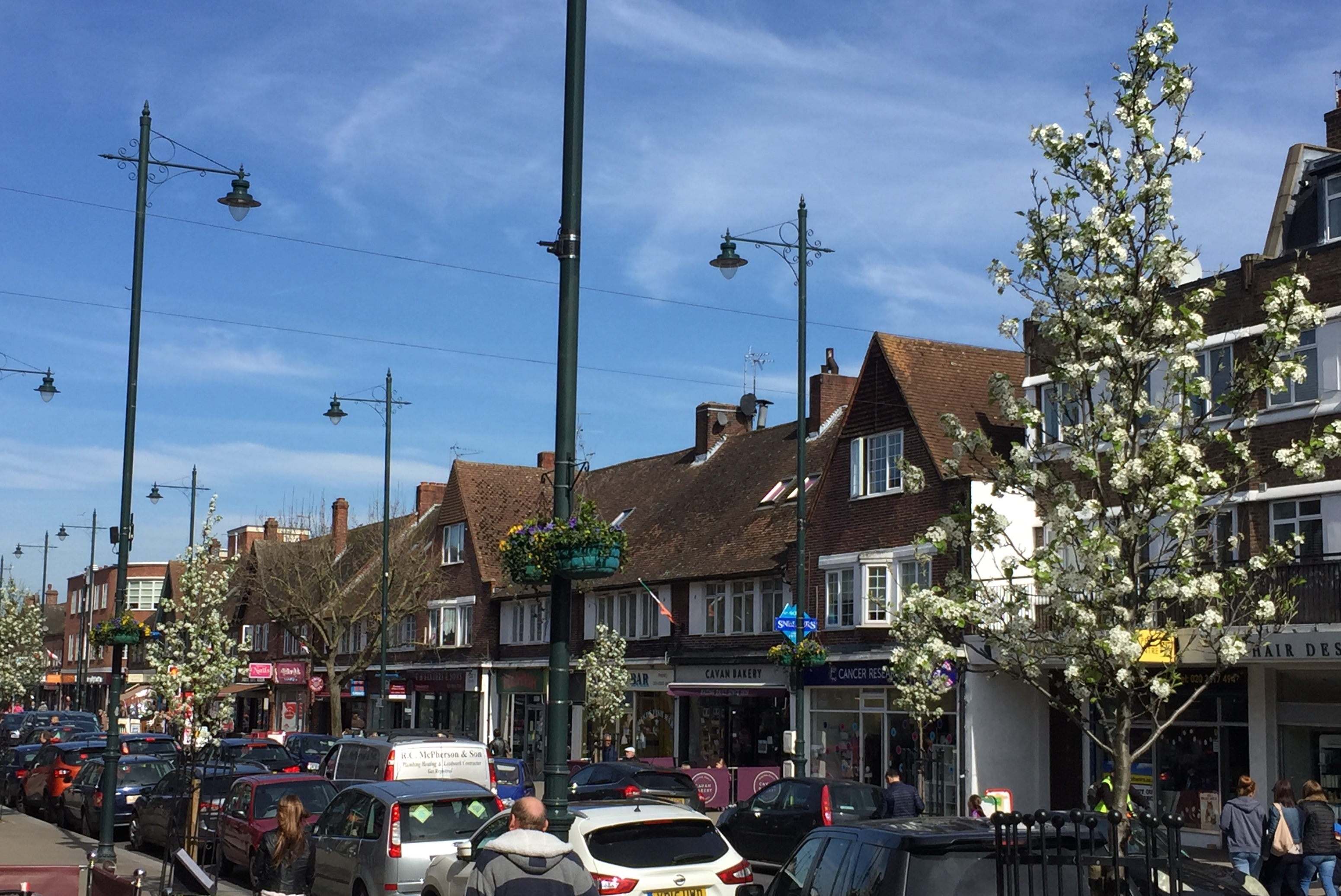
- The High Street

- Location within Greater London
- Area: 3.56 km^{2} (1.37 sq mi)
- Population: 20,065 (2011 census Heathfield+Whitton 2011)
  - Density: 5,636/km^{2} (14,600/sq mi)
- OS grid reference: TQ145735
- London borough: Richmond
- Ceremonial county: Greater London
- Region: London
- Country: England
- Sovereign state: United Kingdom
- Post town: TWICKENHAM
- Postcode district: TW2
- Post town: HOUNSLOW
- Postcode district: TW3, TW4
- Post town: ISLEWORTH
- Postcode district: TW7
- Dialling code: 020
- Police: Metropolitan
- Fire: London
- Ambulance: London
- UK Parliament: Brentford and Isleworth
- London Assembly: South West

Whitton is an area of the London Borough of Richmond upon Thames, England. Historically, it was the north-western part of Twickenham manor, bounded by the River Crane and the Duke of Northumberland's River. It borders the London Borough of Hounslow also.

Whitton High Street is one of the best-preserved 1930s high streets in London. The most common type of housing in the area is 1930s detached and semi-detached housing. Whitton lies on the A316 road, which leads to the M3 motorway, and Whitton railway station is on the line from London Waterloo to Windsor. As a mainly residential area in outer London, many residents commute to Central London.

== History ==
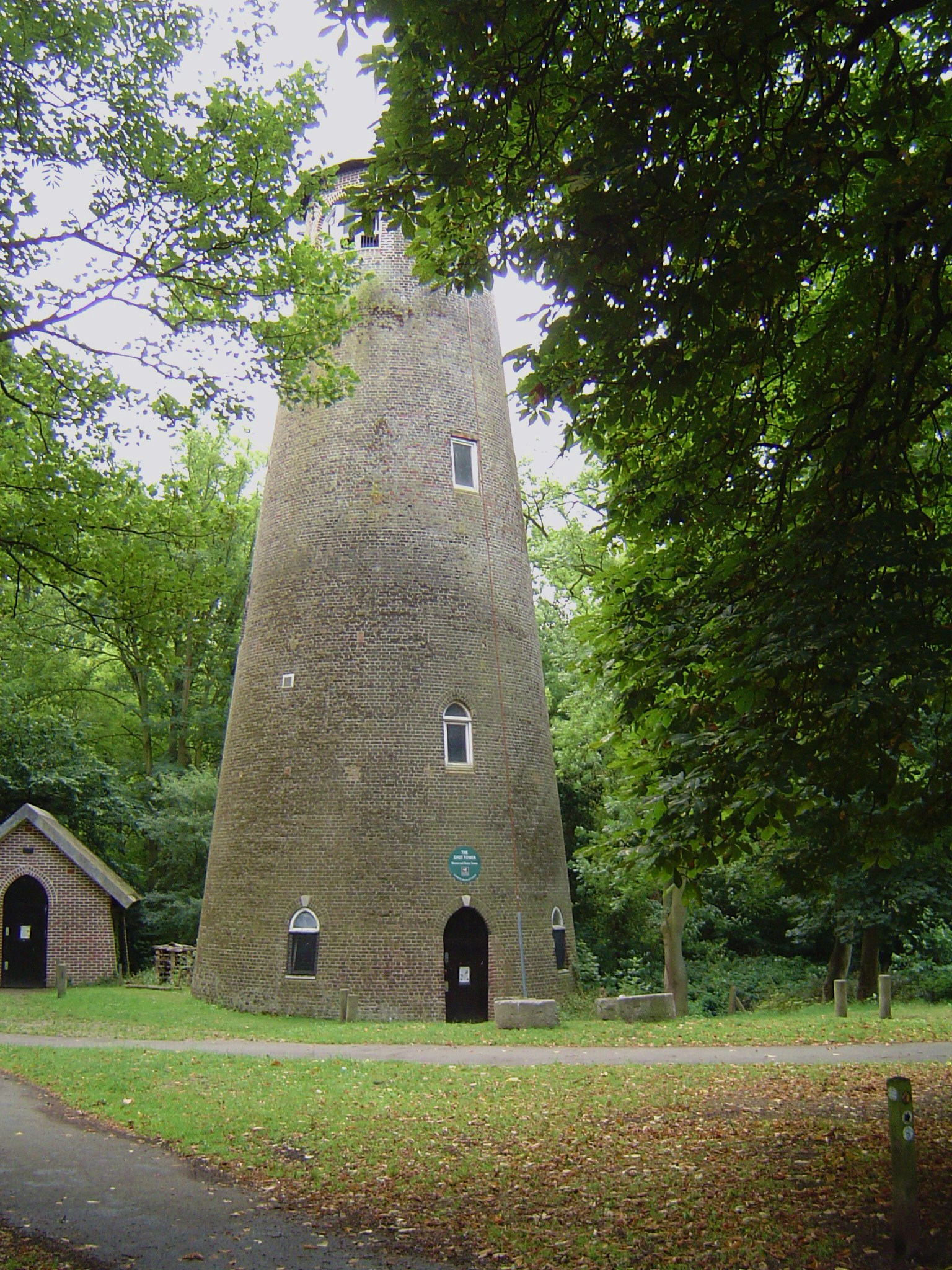
The Shot Tower in Crane Park, Whitton

Whitton was formally part of the ancient parish of Twickenham until 1862 when it became a separate parish, with the church of St Philip and St James opening that year. Due to rapid development, the parish was divided again in 1958; the two electoral wards that make up the area still broadly follow these two parish boundaries.

=== Bronze Age ===
In 1999, excavations on the former Feltham marshalling yard, located on the western border of Whitton, unearthed remains of an Iron Age furnace and post holes from a round house. There are various remains of former mills and other industrial archaeological features adjoining the River Crane; this part of the river is classified as an Archaeological Priority Area.

=== Norman ===
In Norman times, Whitton was the western rural part of Twickenham, which in turn was part of the Manor of Isleworth – itself part of the hundred of the same name in the ancient county of Middlesex. The manor had belonged to Ælfgar, Earl of Mercia in the time of Edward the Confessor, but was granted to Walter de Saint-Valery (Waleric) by William the Conqueror after 1066.

=== Tudor ===
Around 1540, gunpowder started to be produced on Hounslow Heath, which at the time covered a large part of Twickenham. The site, beside the River Crane, was to become known as the Hounslow Gunpowder Mills, and was chosen in part as it was away from built-up areas, lessening the impact of accidental explosions. The site remained active until 1927.

By the 16th century the area that was to become Whitton started to see large houses being developed, as the fashionable society in Twickenham started to spread outward. The Elizabethan and Jacobean courtier Sir John Suckling built a house in the vicinity of the present Murray Park (his son the poet Sir John Suckling was born in Whitton in 1609). Sir John later replaced his first house with a grander residence on land adjoining today's Warren Road.

=== Stuart ===
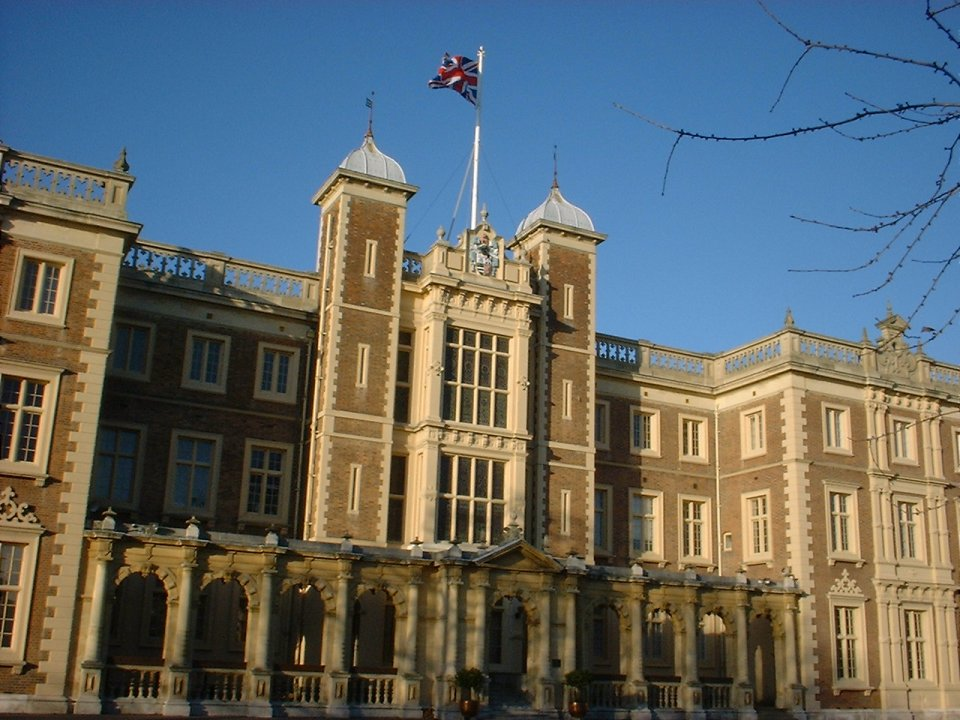
Kneller Hall

Around 1640, Edmund Cooke built a large house close to the centre of the village. In 1709, this house was bought by the court painter Sir Godfrey Kneller, who had it demolished and replaced with a larger house reputedly designed by Sir Christopher Wren. This house was originally known as Whitton Hall, but was renamed Kneller Hall following Kneller's death in 1723. It was considerably modified by later owners, before it was acquired by the state in 1847 for use as a teacher training college. Until 2021 it was home to the Royal Military School of Music.

At the centre of the original village, about 200 metres from Kneller Hall, is the White Hart, an inn dating back to at least the mid-17th century and possibly much earlier. Records relating to this inn seem to suggest that Whitton had an importance that was not well recorded, or that travellers passed through it in considerable numbers. A document of 1685 shows that it provided three beds and stabling for ten horses, numbers which did not seem to fit with Whitton's apparent status as a sleepy rural hamlet with only a few dozen inhabitants.

=== Georgian ===
At the northern end of Whitton was Whitton Park, the estate of Archibald Campbell, 3rd Duke of Argyll. The Duke established the estate in 1722 on land that had been enclosed some years earlier from Hounslow Heath. An enthusiastic gardener, the Duke imported large numbers of exotic species of plants and trees for his estate; he received professional advice from the Scottish gardener James Lee (1715–1795). After the Duke's death in 1761, his nephew John Stuart, 3rd Earl of Bute, moved many of these plants and trees, including mature trees, to the Princess of Wales' new garden at Kew, which later became Kew Gardens. Some of the Duke's trees can still be seen at Kew Gardens to this day.

=== Victorian ===
Whitton was renowned as a market garden, known for its roses, narcissi, lilies of the valley and for its apple, plum and pear orchards. Indeed, until the 1920s the village was still separated from the surrounding towns by open fields and much of the earlier character of the old village was retained well into the 1940s.

Following the coming of the railways in the mid-19th century, there was some housing development along Nelson, Kneller and Hounslow Roads. Whitton was initially served by what is now Hounslow railway station, which opened on 1 February 1850.

=== Early 20th century ===
Whitton developed rapidly following the opening of Whitton railway station, on Percy Road, in 1930. Houses replaced the market gardens and the former Whitton Park estate, while new parades of shops were built on either side of Percy Road from the new railway station to the junction with Nelson and Hounslow Roads, this stretch then being renamed High Street Whitton.

At around the same time, the A316 Chertsey Road was built through the south of the area. Today, this road leads to the M3 motorway, with links to Southampton and the South West of England.

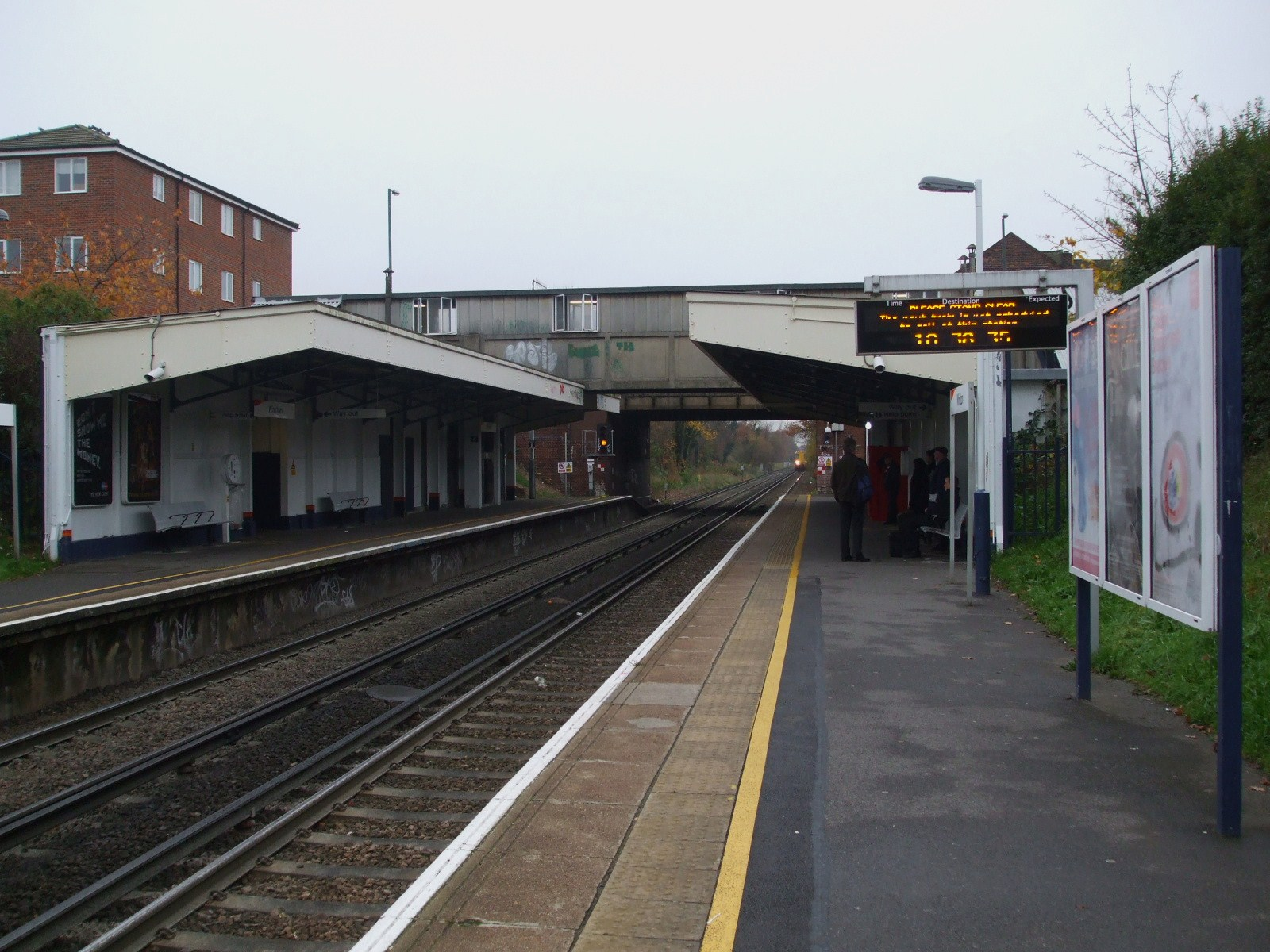
Whitton railway station

=== World War II ===
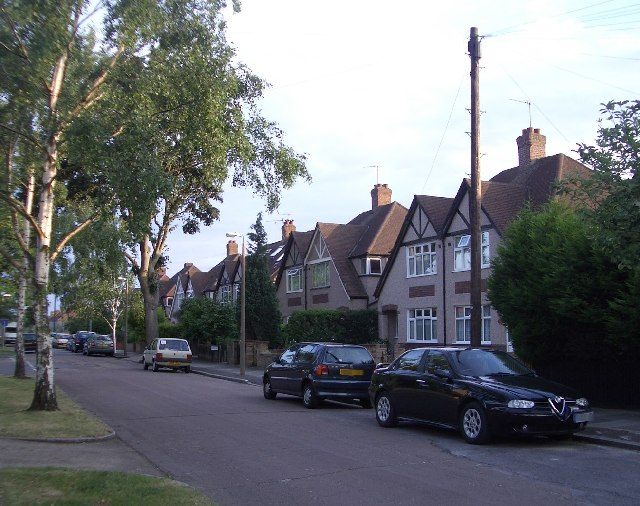
1930s houses on the site of Whitton Park

A number of houses were damaged by enemy bombing in the early years of the Second World War. Before 1944, 86 Hounslow Road received a direct hit from a German bomb and was badly damaged, though not destroyed. In June 1944, 81 High Street received a direct hit from a V-1 flying bomb. Part of the parade of shops and the flats above were totally destroyed and several people were killed. Around the same time, a house on Lincoln Avenue was also destroyed by a V-1 and several adjoining houses were severely damaged.

A common sight during the Blitz was of RAF fighters scrambling from nearby airfields almost at rooftop height, low enough for the pilots to be seen in their cockpits.

== Economy ==
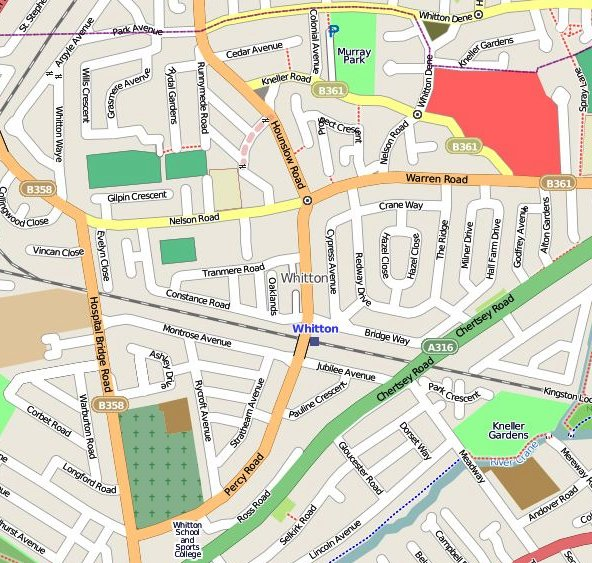
Street map of Whitton. Click to enlarge.

Most people travel outside of the town for their work as very little land is in employment use. Many people travel into Central London making use of the good transport connections, or work in nearby district centres such as Twickenham and Richmond or the bigger metropolitan centres such as Hounslow and Kingston upon Thames. London Heathrow Airport is important to the local economy both through direct employment and the cluster of international firms that have their European headquarters in the Thames Valley area.

The town centre is the third largest in the Richmond upon Thames. In 2014, it received a £2 million programme of economic regeneration including new street lighting, yorkstone pavements and a £5 million redevelopment of the railway station was completed in December 2016.

== Notable inhabitants ==
- Charles Calvert (1768–1832), brewer and Member of Parliament, lived at Kneller Hall.
- Phil Collins (1951–), musician
- Elvis Costello (1954–), musician
- Lauren James (2001–), footballer for the England national team
- Sir Godfrey Kneller (1646–1723), portrait painter, built a house in 1709 in Whitton; its site is now occupied by the mid-19th century Kneller Hall, which became home of the Royal Military School of Music ad is now the Upper School for Radnor House School, Twickenham.
- Lucy Irvine (1956–), British adventurer and author, was born in Whitton.
- Michael MacLeod (1930–2018), graphic designer noted for his crisp packet designs
- Munira Wilson (1978–), Liberal Democrat Member of Parliament

Karam Nama (1964-), writer. He has published several books

== Leisure activities ==
=== Parks and open spaces ===
The town has one long linear park along the River Crane, London and five smaller neighbourhood parks that have sport facilities and children's playgrounds along with three cemeteries. Close to the town are the large Bushy Park and Richmond Park that are managed by The Royal Parks and serve as the larger district parks for the area. Hounslow Heath, a large open space and local conservation area is heavily used by the town's residents.

- Borough Cemetery along Powder Mill Lane and operated by London Borough of Hounslow.
- Heathfield Recreation Ground ("the Rec") was opened in the 1930s and is laid out to accommodate sport pitches and a pavilion. In 2022 a 1.8ha extension was added, designated as a nature zone and named Jubilee Meadows in recognition of the Platinum Jubilee of Elizabeth II.
- Hounslow Heath is located directly to the north of Whitton. It is one of the largest open spaces in West London and managed by London Borough of Hounslow as a nature reserve.
- Hounslow Heath Open Space is the part of Hounslow Heath within London Borough of Richmond upon Thames and managed as a recreation ground and contains a children's playground.
- Chase Green is located between Redway Drive and Godfrey Avenue, next to Chertsey Road (A316) and is a registered Village Green and contains a children's playground and a dog park.
- Crane Park, the largest nearby park, lies to the south on the London Loop walking route. It is managed as a number of wildlife habitats and is home to a number of protected species such as bats and common kingfishers. The river is also the historic boundary line between Whitton and Twickenham.
- Hounslow Cemetery along Hanworth Road and operated by London Borough of Hounslow
- Kneller Gardens was opened in 1931 and is set out as grassland and children's playgrounds.
- Murray Park was opened in 1914 and is set out as grassland and children's playgrounds.
- Twickenham Cemetery was opened in 1868 by the local council and serves as the main burial ground for Twickenham.

=== Cycling ===
Richmond is part of the London Cycle Network, offering on and off-road cycle paths throughout the area.

=== Leisure centres ===
The local authority operated Whitton Sports and Fitness Centre, based at the Twickenham School site, has a modern gym, sports hall and astroturf pitches. There are also three large commercial health clubs just over the town's boundary at The Stoop, Twickenham Golf Course and Twickenham Stadium.

=== Sport clubs ===
There are a number of sports clubs in Whitton including the Whitton Lions rugby club and Hounslow and Whitton Cricket Club both located at the Whitton Park Sports Association, and the Whitton Tennis Club based next to Kneller Hall.

=== Cinema ===
The Odeon cinema in the high street closed in December 1961; since then, residents have had to travel to nearby towns such to visit a cinema. The local council has built a new arts centre in Twickenham which has a 300-seat auditorium for dual theatre and cinema use. This was due to open in 2017, opposite Twickenham station, but has not yet been formally named.

=== Youth centre ===
In September 2013, Richmond Council opened a youth centre located behind Whitton High Street in Britannia Lane.

=== Heritage ===
With the Royal Court often staying in Richmond and Hampton Court in the eighteenth century, Twickenham was a very fashionable place to live and this has left the area with a unique cultural heritage. Many residents remember childhood outings to a number of important historical houses on the doorstep of Whitton including Ham House, Hampton Court Palace, Marble Hill House, Sion House and Strawberry Hill House. The only remaining country house left in Whitton is Kneller Hall, which was home to the Royal Military School of Music.

There is on only one Conservation Area in the locality: Rosecroft Gardens. In addition, there are a number of listed buildings such as Kneller Hall, the Shot Tower at Crane Park along with a number of locally listed buildings.

== Governance ==
Whitton is part of the Brentford and Isleworth constituency for elections to the House of Commons of the United Kingdom.

Whitton is part of the Whitton ward for elections to Richmond upon Thames London Borough Council.

== Education ==
=== Primary schools ===
There are five primary schools in Whitton. Two of them are voluntary-aided faith schools – Bishop Perrin Church of England Primary (opened in 1936) and St. Edmund's Roman Catholic Primary (opened in 1938). The other three have no faith designation – Chase Bridge Primary School, Heathfield Schools Partnership and Nelson School.

Chase Bridge Primary and Heathfield Schools Partnership are maintained by the local authority, with Heathfield being a federation of nursery, infants (opened 1931), and Junior schools on one site. Nelson Primary (opened 1911) is now an academy run by the Latchmere Academy Trust. Neighbouring schools in areas like Hounslow and Twickenham, including St Marks Catholic School, Heathlands, and Primary schools like Twickenham Primary academy and Archadeon Cambridge as well as Trafalgar Schools partnerships. Trafalgar includes nursery, infant, and Junior schools.

=== Secondary schools ===
Whitton has two secondary schools, Twickenham School in Percy Road, and Turing House School in Hospital Bridge Road. An independent school, Radnor House, is planning to relocate its senior students to Whitton's Kneller Hall, subject to planning permission.

Many local children go to other Richmond Borough secondary schools, or to secondary schools in neighbouring boroughs. Significant numbers go to The Heathland's School in nearby Hounslow or to the Richmond upon Thames School (RTS) just over the A316 in Twickenham.

== Churches ==
In 1862 Whitton separated from St Mary's, Twickenham to become the parish of St Philip and St. James Whitton. In anticipation of this change Church of St Philip and St James (C of E) was built. In 1935, due to population growth, St Augustine of Canterbury, Whitton, was created as a London Diocesan Home Mission church in 1935, within the parish of St Philip and St Paul, and met in the main hall of Bishop Perrin School, Hospital Bridge Road. Later in 1958 it became the parish of 'St. Augustine Whitton' to coincide with the opening of new St Augustine's, Whitton that was opened further up Hospital Bridge Road.

Whitton Methodist Church, in Percy Road, now shares its building with Calvary Chapel Twickenham, which is a Baptist church.

A non-conformist Gospel Hall was built in 1881 on the western side of Nelson Road a few metres to the north of the junction with Warren Road. This became redundant with the opening of Whitton Baptist Church in Hounslow Road in 1935 and was later used by various commercial enterprises. The building of Whitton Baptist Church was funded by the compensation paid for the compulsory purchase of St Margaret's Baptist Church, which was demolished during the construction of the Great Chertsey Road approach to the new Twickenham Bridge across the Thames in 1932. Another Baptist church, The Free Grace Baptist Church, was formed in 1964 and meets in a former Salvation Army Hall in Powder Mill Lane.

The Catholic Church of St Edmund of Canterbury is in Nelson Road and was opened in 1934 by the Edmundite Fathers (Society of Saint Edmund). In 1988 the Edmundite Fathers left Whitton, since when the parish has been in the care of secular clergy.

== Demography and housing ==
2011 Census homes
Ward	Detached	Semi-detached	Terraced	Flats and apartments	Caravans/temporary/mobile homes/houseboats	Shared between households
Whitton	826	1,770	908	492	0	11
Heathfield	291	2.213	418	996	0	0

2011 Census households
Ward	Population	Households	% Owned outright	% Owned with a loan	hectares
Whitton	9,752	3,675	35	39	162
Heathfield	10,313	4,964	32	33	191

== Transport ==
=== Roads ===
Whitton has good road links and is less than 10 miles from the M25. Journeys to Kingston upon Thames take twenty minutes, journeys to Hounslow take 5 minutes or 10 minutes by foot, whilst a journey to Richmond is ten minutes.

The A316 becomes the M3 at Sunbury-on-Thames and connects with the M25 at junction 2. Going the other direction the A316 passes by Twickenham town centre and then Richmond, Kew, Mortlake, and finally Chiswick where it joins The Great West Road A4.

=== Tube/trains ===
The principal rail service from Whitton railway station is the Windsor Line into London Waterloo, taking 30 minutes on the 'semi-fast' service operated by South Western Railway. There is also a 'stopping' service that calls at all stations and takes 40 minutes via Richmond, or 50 minutes via Brentford. Residents living in the north of the town use the closer Hounslow on the Hounslow Loop Line and Waterloo-Reading mainline.

As London Underground does not serve the Twickenham area, connections are often made at Richmond for the District line, or at Hounslow East for the Piccadilly line. Plans to increase the frequency of the 'semi-fast' service to four trains per hour were first discussed in the Wessex Route Study consultation held in 2014 and are expected to be included in the new South Western franchise. However, Richmond Council has requested these go via the Hounslow Loop and not Richmond due to concerns about the amount of time the level crossing would need to be down in Barnes.

=== Buses ===
Whitton is served by London Buses routes 110, 111, 281, 481, H20 and H22.

== Geography ==
Whitton is located between the two district centres of Hounslow to the north, and Twickenham town centre to the east and is for the most part suburban housing. The land is between 60 and 70 feet above sea level and is noticeable flat and fertile and was once home to extensive market gardens until the turn of the twentieth century. The soil is mainly Taplow gravel with some patches of brick clay.

The borough's main arterial road, the A316, running between Chiswick and the M3 motorway was built in the 1930s. Over time areas south of the A316 have been transferred to Twickenham apart from the Rosecroft Estate (which can only be accessed via the A316 thus cutting off Whitton from the rest of Twickenham and helping to develop the separate community identity in Whitton.

Whitton residents have a Twickenham (TW2), Whitton, Hounslow (TW3 & TW4) or Isleworth (TW7) post town and postcode. Residents who live in Whitton but on the border of Whitton and Hounslow have a Whitton, Hounslow (TW3 & TW4) post town and postcode. Prior to 2015, these residents who were on the border only had a post town of Hounslow despite living in Whitton. However, when he was MP for Twickenham, Vince Cable asked Royal Mail to create Whitton as a post town. In 2015, Royal Mail created Whitton as a unique postal district where now residents of Whitton who live on the border of Whitton and Hounslow can put Whitton in their address. People still do get Hounslow postcodes, and Hounslow postcodes still work, which has been unchanged in roads such as Curtis Road and Mill Lane that border Hounslow.

== Nearest places ==
Whitton is bordered by a number of other residential districts, with other areas of Twickenham and the centre itself nearby. Large nearby towns including Richmond, Hounslow and Kingston upon Thames are also close and have an even greater pull, especially Richmond, due to their shopping facilities and employment opportunities.
