= St Stephen's School, Twickenham =

St Stephen's C of E Primary School

Location
- Winchester Rd; Twickenham, London, TW1 1LF; England; 51°27′24″N 0°22′16″W

Information
- Type: Voluntary aided primary
- Religious affiliation: Church of England
- Established: 1876
- Local authority: Richmond upon Thames
- Department for Education URN: 102915 Tables
- Ofsted: Reports
- Chair of Governors: Mrs S Peace
- Head teacher: Mrs L Bachour
- Gender: Coeducational
- Age: 4 to 11
- Enrolment: 320~
- Houses: Red, Yellow, Green, Blue
- Website: www.st-stephens.richmond.sch.uk

St. Stephens School is a mixed, state-run, Church of England primary school, located in Twickenham, in the London Borough of Richmond upon Thames, England.

It is affiliated with St. Stephens Church in Twickenham and regularly holds events there.

== History ==
St Stephen's dates back to 1876 when it was constructed at Turk's Lane (now Winchester Road) and opened under government inspection. A second building was built at Chertsey Road. The original building at Turk's Lane was later condemned by the Department of Education.

In 2011, because of a lack of spaces at both Orleans Infants School and St Stephen's, Richmond Council decided to renovate both schools, converting them to primary schools. Works were completed by 2015.

== Former pupils ==
- Sophie Ellis-Bextor

== See also ==
- List of schools in Twickenham
