= William Reader =

William Reader may refer to:

- William Reader (politician), member of the Wisconsin State Assembly
- William Reader (priest), Irish priest
- William Reader (painter), English painter
- W. J. Reader (William Joseph Reader), English historian
- Ralph Reader (William Henry Ralph Reader), British actor, theatrical producer and songwriter

== See also ==
- William Augustus Reeder, American politician
