= Leslie Marshall =

Leslie Marshall may refer to:

- Leslie Marshall (journalist), American journalist
- Leslie Marshall (writer), American novelist, journalist and wife of politician William Weld
- Leslie Marshall (cricketer) (1894–1978), British athlete
