= Alan George Marshall =

Alan George Marshall may refer to:

- Alan G. Marshall (born 1944), American analytical chemist
- Alan Marshall (cricketer) (1895–1973), English cricketer
