= Graham Henderson (cultural entrepreneur) =

British cultural entrepreneur

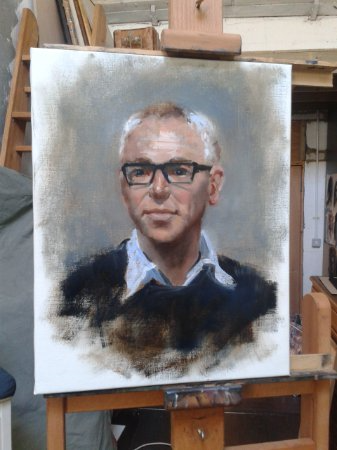
Portrait of Graham Henderson by Ann Witheridge

Graham Henderson is a cultural entrepreneur based in London. He is best known for developing the arts organisation Poet in the City. In 2014 he launched a second arts organisation, the Rimbaud and Verlaine Foundation, committed to cross-arts commissioning and to championing a new funding model for the arts. Henderson has also been involved in many other arts-related initiatives including the development of a public art consultancy, the creation of an international arts network and a campaign to create a new investment fund for the arts.

== Early life and education ==
Henderson was born in Somerset in 1964, was educated at Taunton School in Taunton and Millfield School in Street, Somerset, and spent a year in Ontario, Canada before doing a history degree at Corpus Christi College, Cambridge between 1983 and 1986.

== Early career ==
Graham Henderson’s career has spanned both the City of London and the arts. A qualified solicitor, he previously worked as a commercial litigation lawyer at one of the largest law firms based in the City of London, Clifford Chance. He took a sabbatical break from legal practice in 2000–01 to become a consultant in the specialist travel business in which he created and marketed specialist dance and music activity holidays for both Dance Holidays Ltd and WOMAD. In 2003 he produced Coach of Black Water, an exhibition of Cuban art photographs, which took place at the Menier Gallery in Southwark, the first sponsored exhibition to take place at this venue. In 2004 he launched The Company of Adventurers Ltd in an attempt to raise funding for independent arts and cultural documentary films. And in 2005 he was responsible for arranging the translation and publication of Kindred Spirits, a collected edition of poems by the Cuban poet Regino E Boti, known as "the poet of Guantanamo", which was published by Mango Publications.

== The Lorca case ==
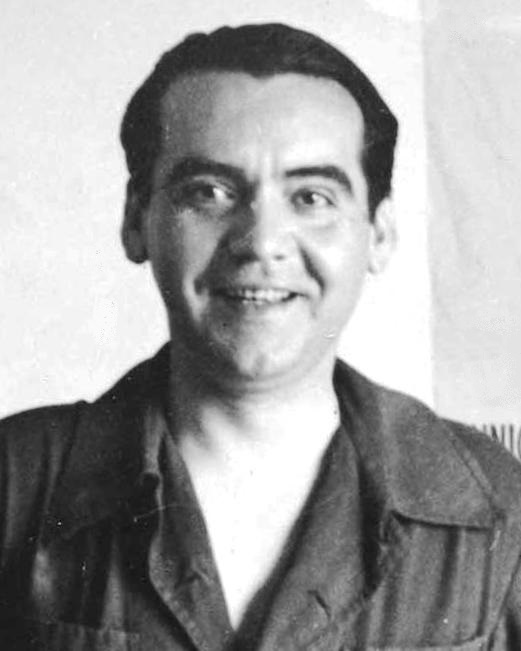
Federico García Lorca in 1932

In 2002, Graham Henderson was the solicitor in charge of the high-profile case concerning ownership of the manuscript of the famous poetry collection Poet in New York by the Spanish poet Federico García Lorca, assassinated by Franco's militia at the start of the Spanish Civil War in 1936. This case resulted in a 10-day trial at the High Court in London, presided over by Judge Peter Smith. The case was a success for Henderson and his law firm, Morgan Cole, who were acting under a conditional fee agreement. Henderson was keen to celebrate the life and work of the poet and organised a special event in the Great Room at Christie’s on the eve of the auction of the manuscript. The event was attended by, amongst others, the ambassadors of all the main countries associated with the manuscript, Spain, Cuba and Mexico. In order that the event should be bipartisan in nature, he invited Poet in the City, a project founded in 1998 by City of London lawyers, to present the event on his behalf. The success of the event led Rosamund McCarthy, its founder and first chair, to invite Henderson to run Poet in the City.

== Poet in the City ==
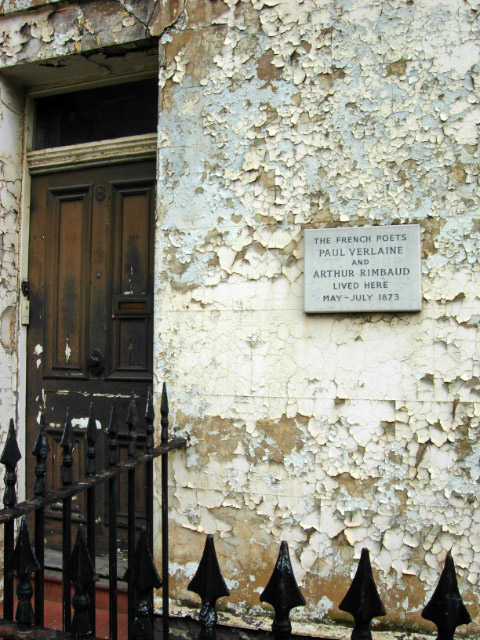
8 Royal College Street in 2007, before restoration

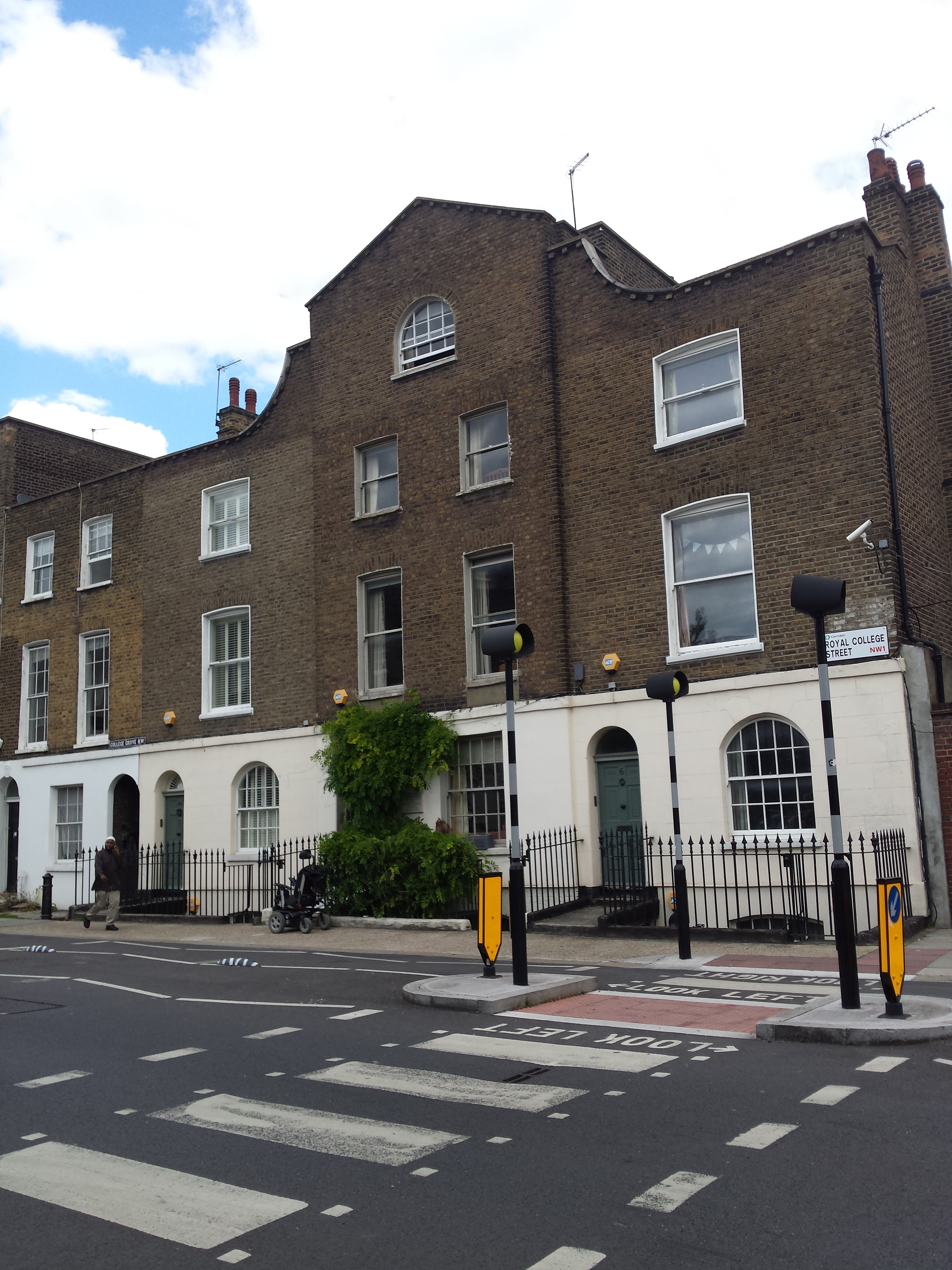
8 Royal College Street in 2015, after restoration

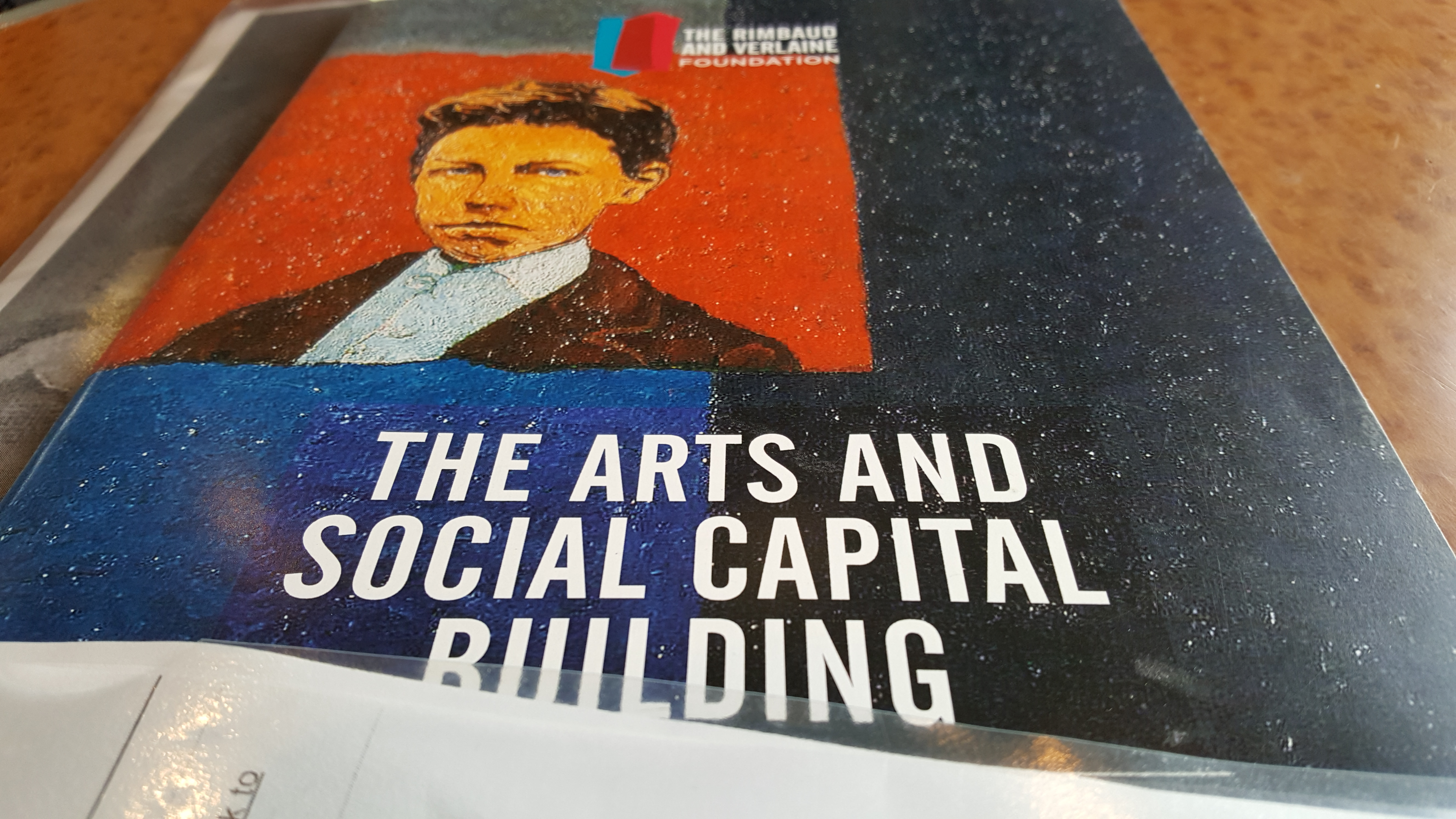
Rimbaud and Verlaine Foundation investment pitch document

Initially Henderson continued to run Poet in the City as a project of the Poetry Society, to which it was affiliated. However, he became increasingly interested in the opportunities it presented to reach out to new audiences for poetry and to access new sources of funding to support poetry education. Establishing Poet in the City as a separate charity in 2006, he obtained substantial sponsorships for it, including sponsorships from leading brands such as Lloyds TSB, HSBC, Pfizer, Linklaters and Lloyd's of London. He also achieved its selection as a National Portfolio Organisation by Arts Council England in 2010. Between 2006 and 2014, Henderson led on programming over 50 high-profile poetry events every year in London and South East England, together with a wide range of other poetry-related projects and activities, including short films, national poetry tours and public art commissions. After organising Poet in the City's successful transition to a new chief executive in April 2014, he remained as a trustee of the charity, and as its public art consultant, until April 2016.

== The Rimbaud and Verlaine Foundation ==
In 2007, Henderson became involved in the campaign to save the Regency property at 8 Royal College Street that had been occupied by the French poets Arthur Rimbaud and Paul Verlaine in 1873. Henderson persuaded the owner, Michael Corby, to leave the property as a legacy gift in his will. The Rimbaud and Verlaine Foundation was created to take advantage of this gift, and with the long-term goal of establishing a European-style "poetry house" at the property, providing a cultural and educational resource for the residents of the London Borough of Camden. Incubated inside of Poet in the City, the Foundation was launched as a separate organisation and as a registered charity in 2014. However, rather than just be a small house museum the Foundation decided to use the poets as an inspiration for a wider mission to champion the arts, create new sources of earned income, and provide platforms for talented up-and-coming artists across many different art forms. Becoming Chief Executive of the new Foundation in April 2014, Henderson delivered a programme of over 30 cross-arts events and original arts commissions during 2014–17 that featured opera, classical and rock music, theatre, film, sculpture and other art forms, as well as poetry and literature. Henderson has also been responsible for developing a new business model for the arts centred on the development of new sources of earned income, and for devising a new form of investment bond suitable as a means of attracting investment to arts organisation.

== Kindred Spirits – The European Poetry House Network ==
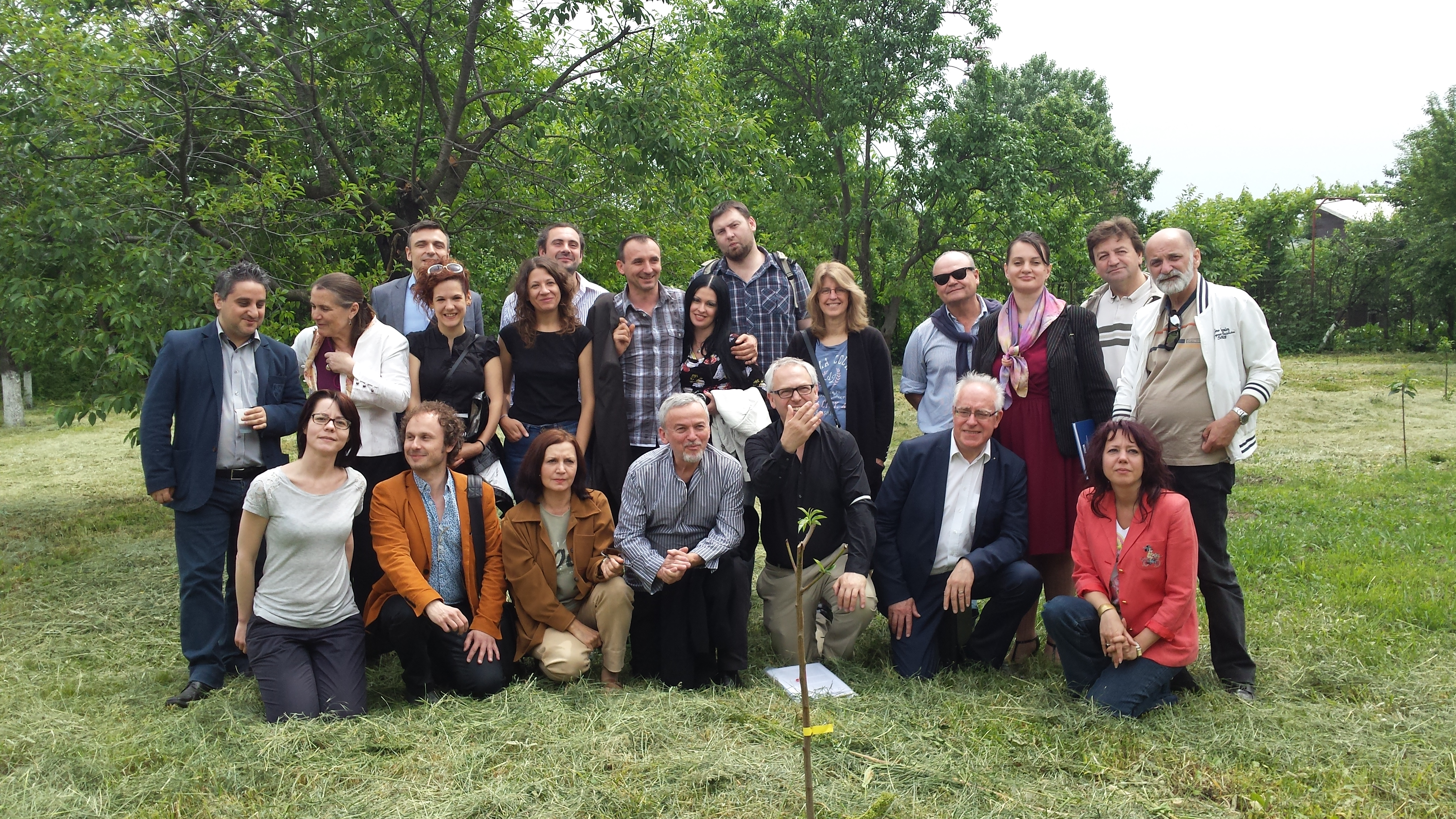
Delegates attending Kindred Spirits conference in Bucharest in 2015

As part of his role in championing the idea of the "poetry house" as a new and streamlined business model for the arts, Henderson created an international collaboration, bringing together seven "poetry houses" in six different European countries. Kindred Spirits seeks to promote international cultural exchange and to develop new business and funding models for the arts, as well as being an arts network and a vehicle for celebrating a shared European culture.

== Social capital building ==
Henderson has long championed the arts as an important source of social capital, and as a fundamental building block of a healthy civil society. This has directly informed his work, both in promoting a new approach to public art and in seeking an innovative new funding model for arts organisations.

== Public art ==
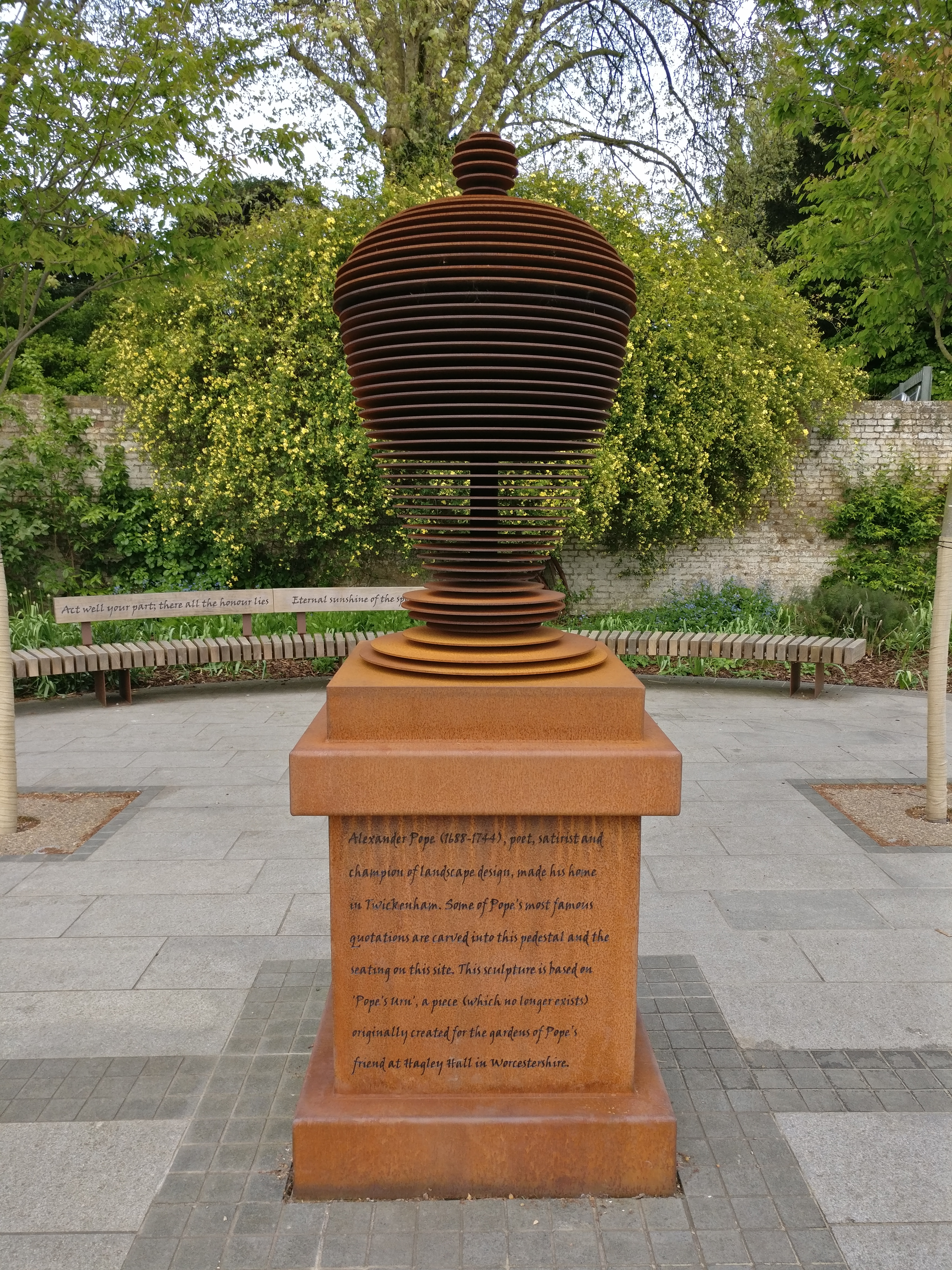
Pope's Urn on Twickenham riverside

As public art consultant for Poet in the City, between 2014 and 2016, Graham Henderson created important new sources of income for the arts. In 2015, working in partnership with Richmond upon Thames Council and the architectural design practice Feilden Clegg Bradley Studios, he conceived, designed, built and installed Pope's Urn, a contemporary piece of public art, inspired by the poetry of Alexander Pope. Enjoying a central position on the Twickenham riverside, the sculpture was commissioned to celebrate the 2015 Rugby World Cup, and was opened in a ceremony in September 2015. This work provided an important source of earned income for Poet in the City in 2015. Associated with this work, Henderson has also been involved in high-level advocacy for innovative approaches to public art, including an active role in the 2014 Farrell Review of Architecture and the Built Environment, writing the official essay in support of its findings, and has continued to work with BEAM in promoting new approaches to the commissioning of public art.

== Limited profit investment fund for the arts ==
As an elected member of the Culture Forum in 2010, Henderson played an important part in developing innovative ideas for the funding of the arts, including an influential paper which led directly to the establishment in 2014 of an Arts Impact Fund. However, he parted company with the Fund over the insistence on the part of some its funders that investment in arts organisations should also achieve so-called "social outcomes". He continued to campaign for the original funds that he proposed in 2010, a limited profit fund designed to help arts organisations to make money from their existing assets and intellectual property rights. Henderson argues that investment which allows arts organisations to develop their sources of earned income will release a great deal of entrepreneurial activity in the arts, particularly amongst small-medium enterprise arts organisations, and will lead to a much more resilient funding basis for the arts sector as a whole.

== Modern Poetry in Translation ==
He was an active board member of the journal Modern Poetry in Translation from 2008 to 2018.

== Oxford Cultural Leaders programme ==
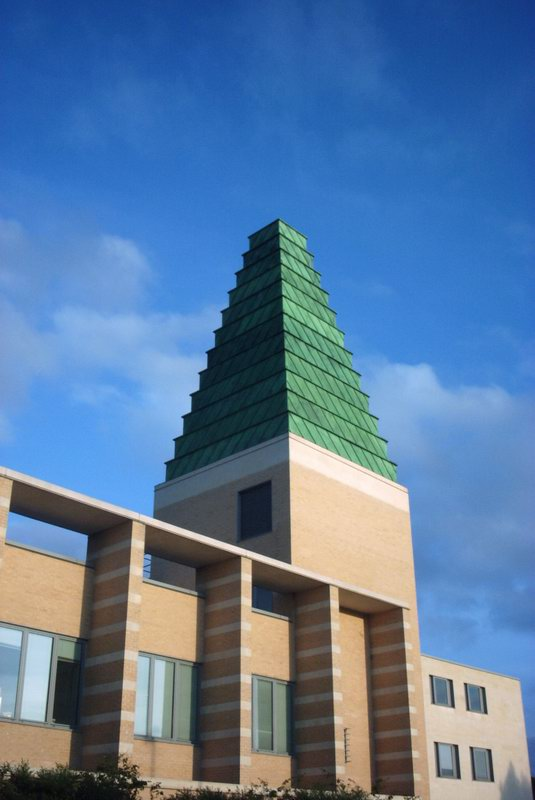
Saïd Business School at the University of Oxford

In 2015 Henderson was selected, along with 17 other leaders from the arts, cultural and museums sectors, to be part of a new residential programme, Oxford Cultural Leaders, delivered by Oxford University Museums in partnership with the Saïd Business School. The programme, held for the first time in 2015, brings together leaders to experiment and take risks, to explore new business models and ways of working and to develop innovative organisational cultures. Henderson subsequently ran the alumni network for all those who have passed through the programme, encouraging them to continue to meet and to collaborate.

== Jan Patočka ==
Henderson has been interested for many years in the ideas of the Czech philosopher Jan Patočka (1907–1977). In particular, Patočka's ideas for "putting soul in the city", and of recapturing the relationship between the arts and social capital building (and between culture and political engagement) characteristic of the ancient Athenians, have been much used by Henderson in his own championship of the arts. As of 2018 he is involved in a project, working in partnership with the Jan Patočka Archive in Prague and with the phenomenologist Erin Plunkett, to publish, for the first time, an English-language edition of the philosopher’s selected works.

== Personal life ==
Graham Henderson lives in Twickenham, in the London Borough of Richmond upon Thames.

== See also ==
- Poet in the City
- Pope's Urn
- Rimbaud and Verlaine Foundation
