= 1908 County Championship =

English cricket tournament

- Cricket format: First-class cricket (3 days)
- Tournament format: League system
- Champions: Yorkshire (8th title)
- Participants: 16
- Most runs: Tom Hayward (1,874 for Surrey)
- Most wickets: Colin Blythe (167 for Kent)

Location of the home ground of each county

The 1908 County Championship was the 19th officially organised running of the County Championship, and ran from 4 May to 31 August 1908. Yorkshire won their eighth championship title, while Kent finished in second place. The previous season's winners, Nottinghamshire, finished in eighth place. In May, Yorkshire bowled out Northamptonshire for 27 and 14, the lowest aggregate in first-class cricket at that point.

== Table ==
- One point was awarded for a win, and one point was taken away for each loss. Final placings were decided by dividing the number of points earned by the number of completed matches (i.e. those that ended in a win or a loss), and multiplying by 100.

Team	Pld	W	L	D	A	Pts	Fin	%Fin
Yorkshire	28	16	0	12	0	16	16	100.00
Kent	26	17	3	5	1	14	20	70.00
Surrey	30	13	4	12	1	9	17	52.94
Middlesex	20	6	3	10	1	3	9	33.33
Sussex	28	6	4	18	0	2	10	20.00
Worcestershire	18	6	5	7	0	1	11	9.09
Lancashire	26	10	9	6	1	1	19	5.26
Nottinghamshire	20	6	7	7	0	–1	13	–7.69
Hampshire	22	7	9	6	0	–2	16	–12.50
Gloucestershire	24	8	11	5	0	–3	19	–15.78
Essex	22	5	7	10	0	–2	12	–16.66
Warwickshire	22	5	9	7	1	–4	14	–28.57
Leicestershire	22	4	8	9	1	–4	12	–33.33
Derbyshire	22	5	13	4	0	–8	18	–44.44
Northamptonshire	22	3	14	5	0	–11	17	–64.70
Somerset	20	2	13	5	0	–11	15	–73.33

== Records ==
=== Batting ===
Most runs
Aggregate	Average	Player	County
1,874	46.85	Tom Hayward	Surrey
1,655	40.36	Alan Marshall	Surrey
1,646	42.20	Gilbert Jessop	Gloucestershire
1,522	43.48	Johnny Tyldesley	Lancashire
1,507	39.65	Jack Hobbs	Surrey

=== Bowling ===
Most wickets
Aggregate	Average	Player	County
167	16.48	Colin Blythe	Kent
156	12.44	George Hirst	Yorkshire
149	20.46	George Dennett	Gloucestershire
148	15.27	Walter Brearley	Lancashire
124	18.66	Harry Dean	Lancashire
