= George Andrews (rugby) =

Wales international rugby union & league footballer

Personal information
- Full name: George Edward Andrews
- Born: 24 August 1904 Newport, Wales
- Died: 28 December 1989 (aged 85) Carshalton, England

Playing information

Rugby union
- Position: Wing
Club
Years	Team	Pld	T	G	FG	P
1921–27	Newport RFC
Representative
Years	Team	Pld	T	G	FG	P
1926–27	Wales	5	3	0	0	9

Rugby league
- Position: Wing
Club
Years	Team	Pld	T	G	FG	P
1927–30	Leeds	97				186
Representative
Years	Team	Pld	T	G	FG	P
1929	Other Nationalities	1	1			3

George Edward Andrews (24 September 1904 – 28 December 1989) was a Welsh dual code rugby wing who played rugby union for Newport RFC and rugby league for Leeds. Andrews was capped for the Wales rugby union team on five occasions.

He attended Taunton School and St Julian's High School, Newport.

== Rugby career ==
Andrews had a successful career with Newport, and was part of the team during the 'invincible' season of 1922/23. He was also selected to represent the Newport team to face two touring international teams, the 1924 New Zealand All Blacks, and the 1926 Maoris. In the match against New Zealand, Andrews scored a try, Newport's only points in a one-sided defeat by the tourists.

Andrews gained his first international cap, when he was selected to play for Rowe Harding's Wales, against England on 16 January 1926. Andrews scored a try on his début which resulted in a Welsh draw after England's Wavell Wakefield also scored a try. Andrews was selected for the next match in the 1926 Five Nations Championship, this time facing Scotland. Wales lost this match and Andrews was not selected for the final two games of the tournament against Ireland and France. The next season Andrews was back, but in the first game against England, Wales lost 11-9, though Andrews scored his second international try during the game. His next match was as part of Ossie Male's team that beat France, and Andrews scored his final international try. His next cap was his last, losing to Ireland at Lansdowne Road in Dublin.

In 1927 Andrews switched from rugby union to rugby league. He 'Went North' for £600 to join Leeds Rugby League and prevented future selection for the Welsh union team as he was then deemed a professional player. George Andrews made his début for Leeds against York at Headingley Stadium on Wednesday 6 April 1927.

== International matches played ==
Wales

- England 1926, 1927
- France 1927
- Ireland 1927
- Scotland 1926

== Bibliography ==
- Smith, David; Williams, Gareth (1980). Fields of Praise: The Official History of The Welsh Rugby Union. Cardiff: University of Wales Press. ISBN 0-7083-0766-3.
