= John Mackie (cricketer) =

Scottish cricketer and soldier

Personal information
- Full name: John Bartlett Mackie
- Born: 11 February 1895; Wincanton, Somerset, England
- Died: 16 September 1983 (aged 88); Hastings, Sussex, England
- Batting: Unknown
- Bowling: Unknown

Domestic team information
- Years: Team
- 1930/31: Europeans

Career statistics
Competition	First-class
Matches	2
Runs scored	0
Batting average	–
100s/50s	–/–
Top score	–
Balls bowled	174
Wickets	1
Bowling average	77.00
5 wickets in innings	–
10 wickets in match	–
Best bowling	1/45
Catches/stumpings	1/–
- Source: ESPNcricinfo, 2 November 2023

John Bartlett Mackie CStJ (11 February 1895 — 16 September 1983) was an English first-class cricketer, soldier, airman, and a figure in the automotive industry.

Mackie was born in June 1898 at Wincanton, Somerset. He was educated at Taunton School, before matriculating to Sidney Sussex College, Cambridge. Mackie served in the First World War with the Somerset Light Infantry, entering from the Cambridge University Officers' Training Corps as a second lieutenant in January 1915. He was made a temporary captain in June 1916, whilst commanding a company. Having relinquished his temporary rank in April 1917, he was promoted to lieutenant in July 1917, Following the war, he was made a temporary major whilst employed as a political officer. Mackie later played a single first-class cricket match in British India for the Europeans cricket team against the Indians at Madras in the 1930–31 Madras Presidency Match. He did not bat during the match, but did take the wicket of M. Venkataramanjulu.

Mackie later served in the Royal Air Force during the Second World War, being commissioned as a pilot officer on probation in November 1939, with confirmation in the rank in November 1940. He was promoted to the war substantive rank of flight lieutenant in May 1940, with him being made a temporary squadron leader in June 1942. He resigned his commission in September 1944, in order to take up a role with the Society of Motor Manufacturers and Traders as the representative of the British motor industry in the Middle East and Near East, helping to organise the exportation of British-manufactured motor vehicles; he was chosen for his previous business experience in the region. In January 1964, he was made a Commander of the Order Saint John Jerusalem. Mackie died at Hastings in September 1983.
