= Pope's Urn =

Memorial to Alexander Pope in Twickenham, London

Coordinates: 51°26′48″N 0°19′29″W

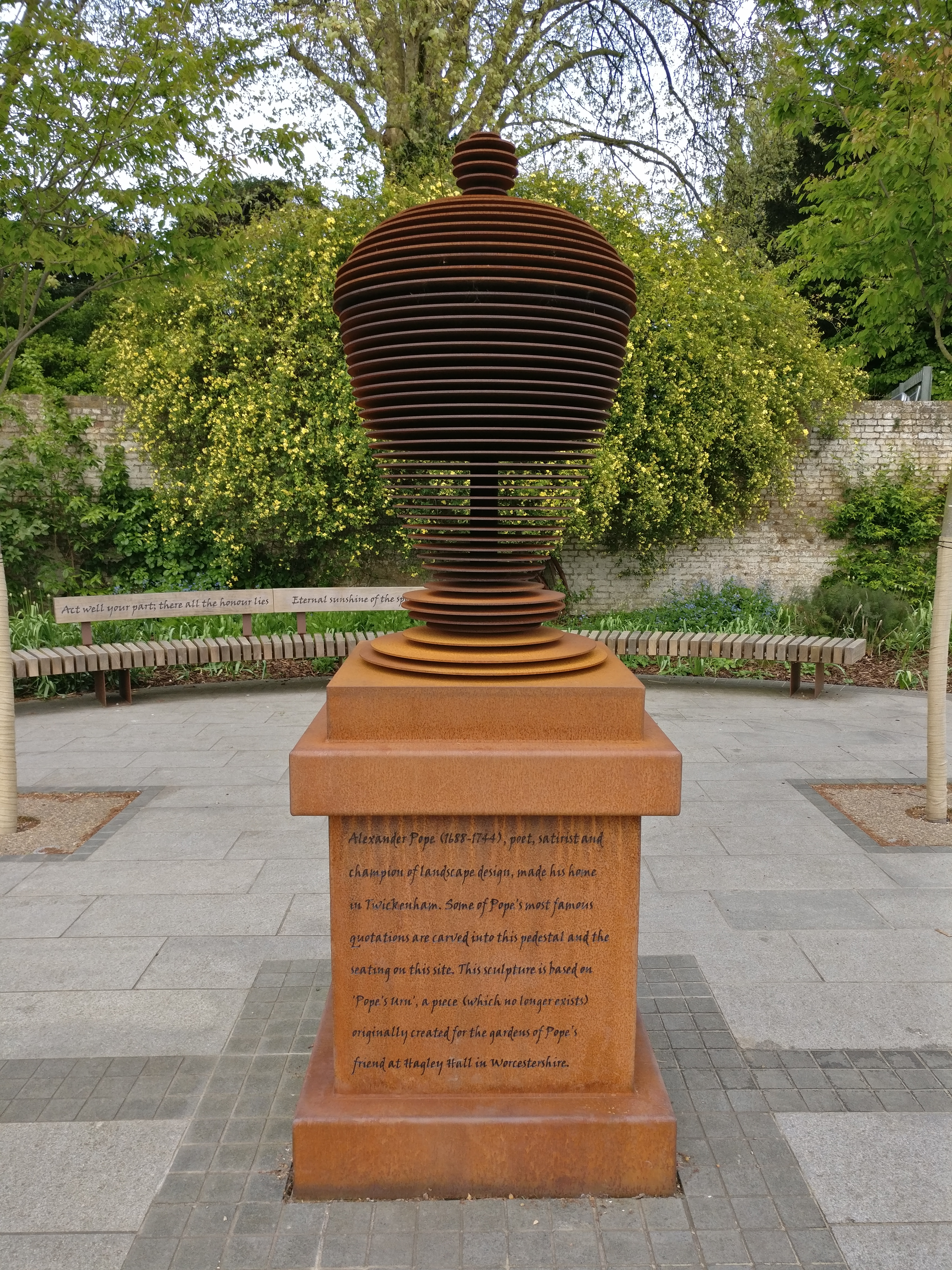
Pope's Urn on Twickenham riverside

Pope's Urn, on Champion's Wharf at Twickenham riverside in the London Borough of Richmond upon Thames, is a contemporary piece of public art inspired by the poetry of 18th-century Twickenham resident Alexander Pope, who is buried in the parish church that overlooks the wharf. It consists of a stylised urn on a pedestal, both made in corten steel and standing just over eight-foot (2.5 metres) high, surrounded by wooden benches inscribed with aphorisms written by Pope. It was commissioned to celebrate the 2015 Rugby World Cup, for which Twickenham Stadium was one of the venues, and was opened in a ceremony on 21 September 2015.

Pope's Urn was the initiative of Twickenham resident Graham Henderson as public art consultant for the London-based arts charity Poet in the City. Henderson conceived the project and worked in partnership with Richmond upon Thames Council, and the architectural design practice Feilden Clegg Bradley Studios, to design, build and install it. It was unveiled by Lord True, Leader of Richmond Council, in a ceremony which included readings from Pope's works by the actor John Hannah, who is a local resident, and by the actress Dame Harriet Walter.

The sculpture is based on drawings that have survived of an urn designed by Alexander Pope for a friend's garden at Hagley Hall, Worcestershire. The original urn no longer exists.

== Gallery ==
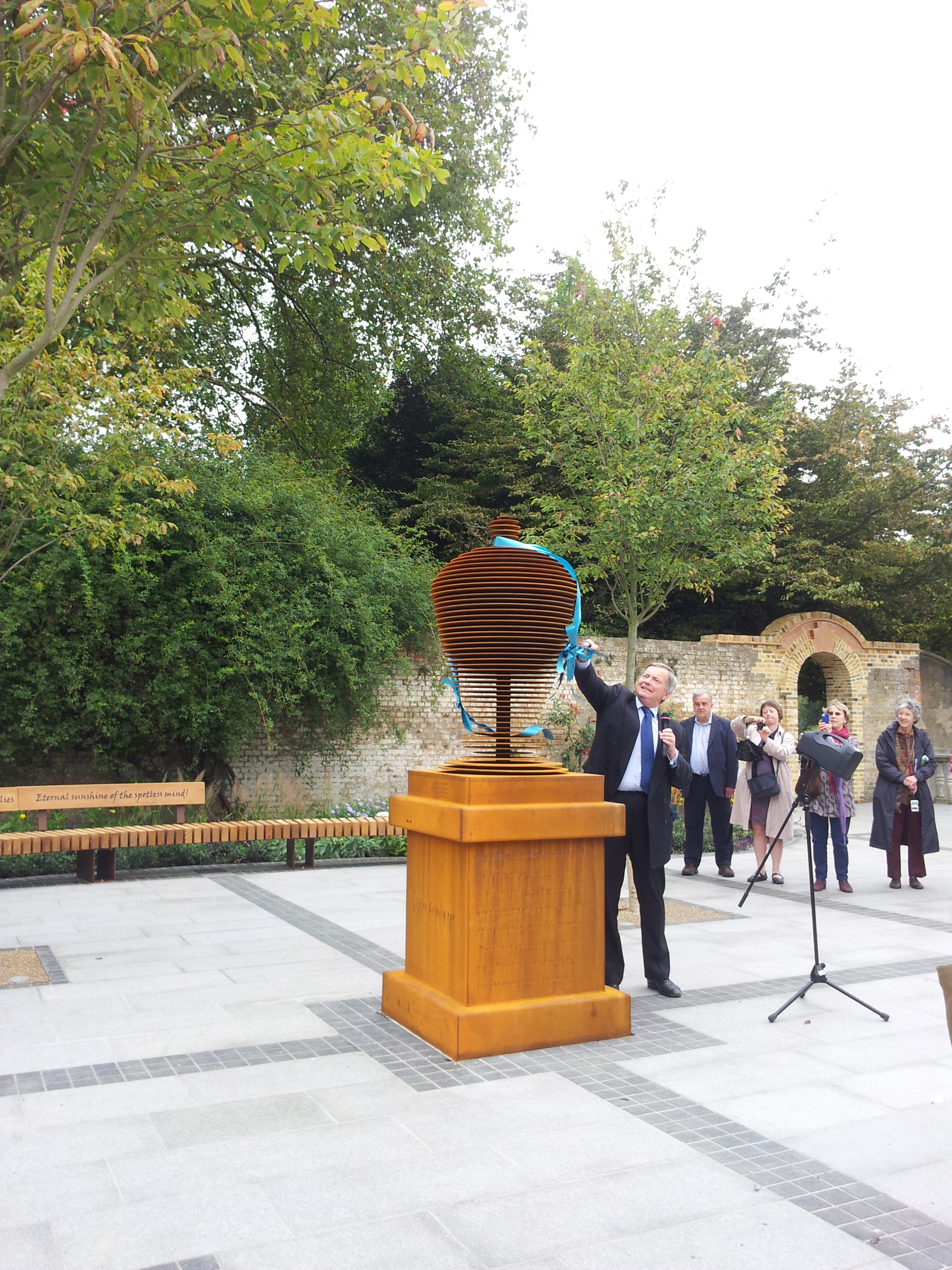
Lord True unveiling Pope's Urn at Champion's Wharf, Twickenham, 21 September 2015

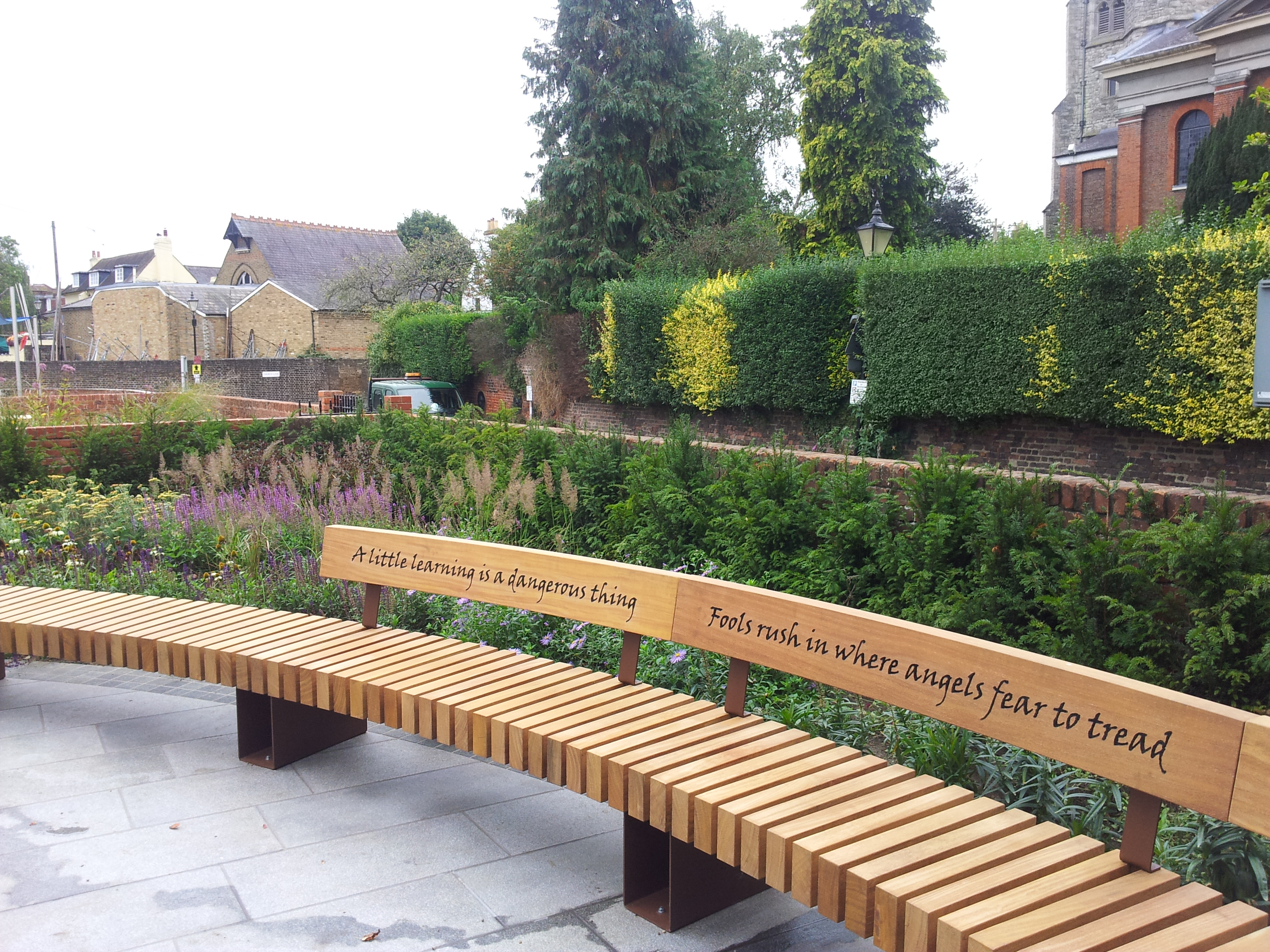
Pope's Urn benches, with St Mary's Church, Twickenham, in the background

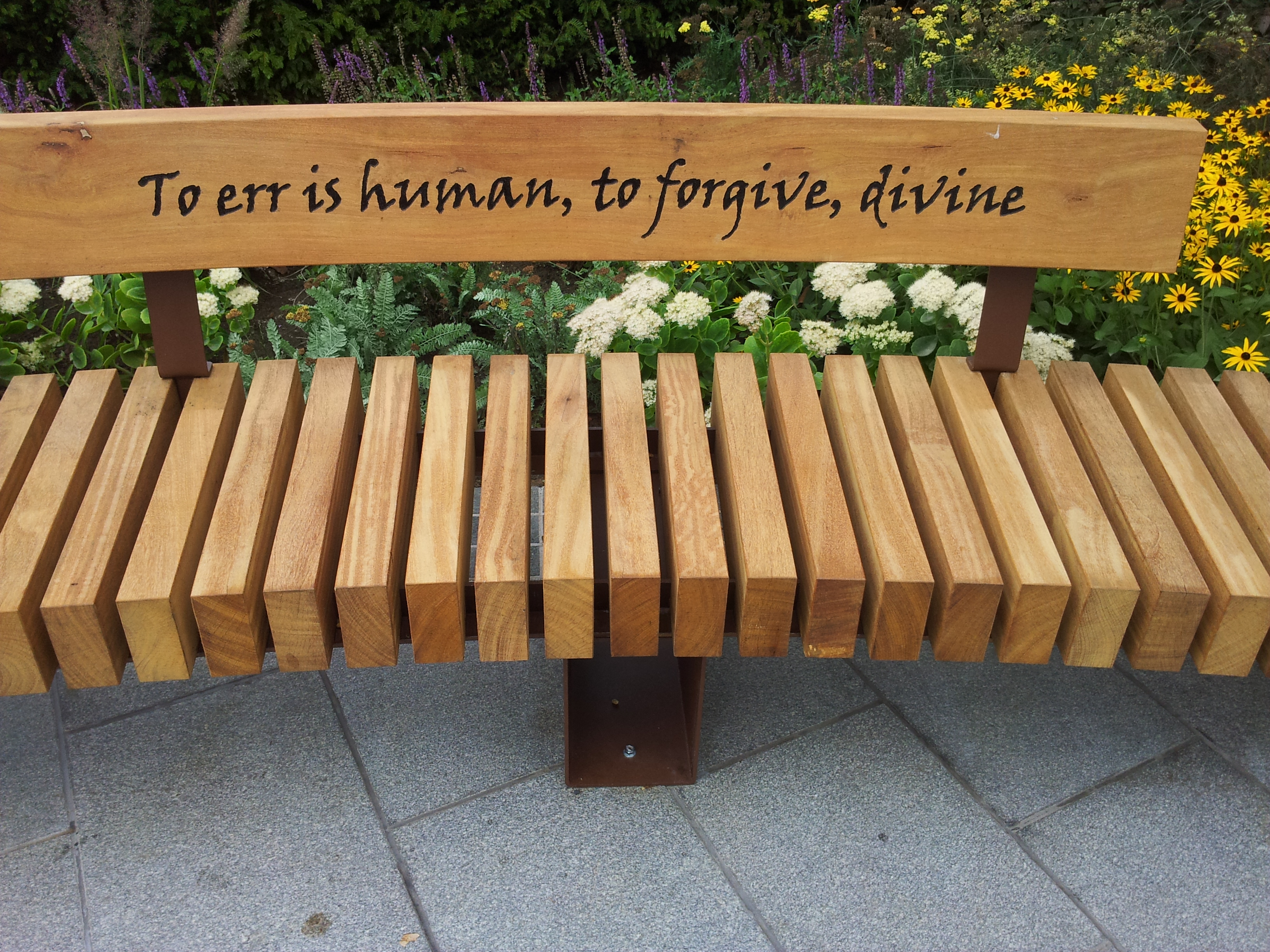
To err is human...

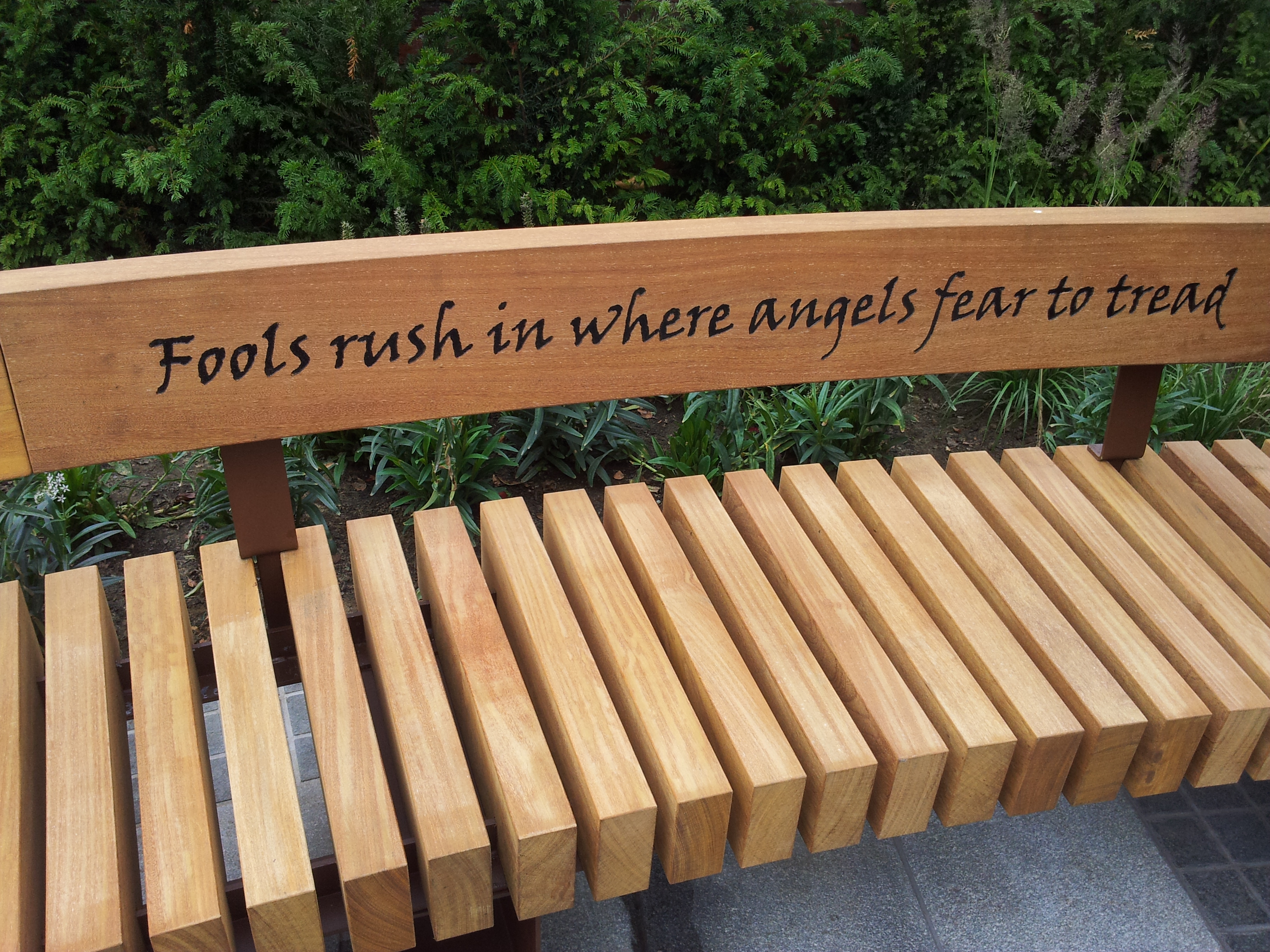
Fools rush in where angels fear to tread

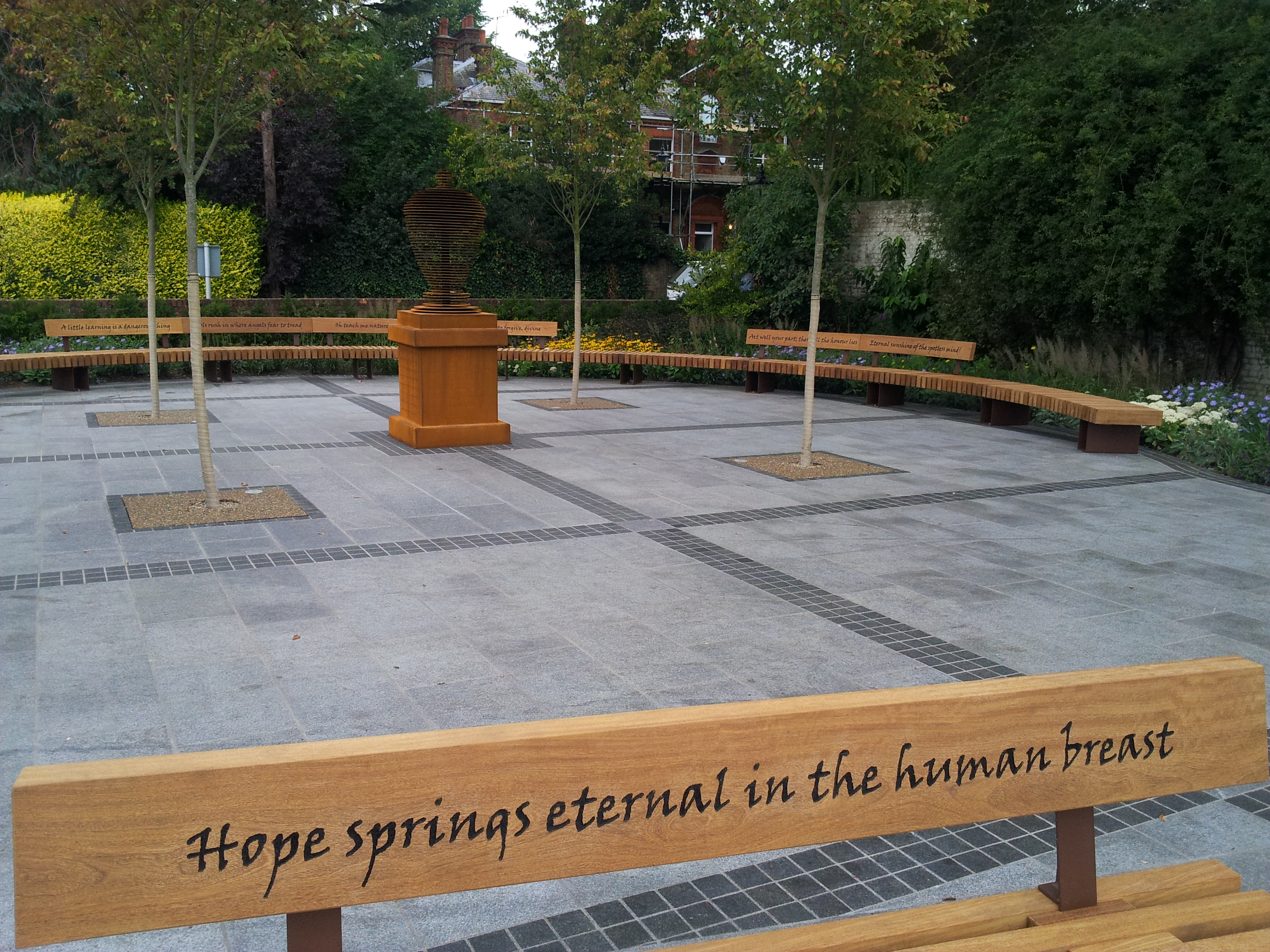
Hope springs eternal...

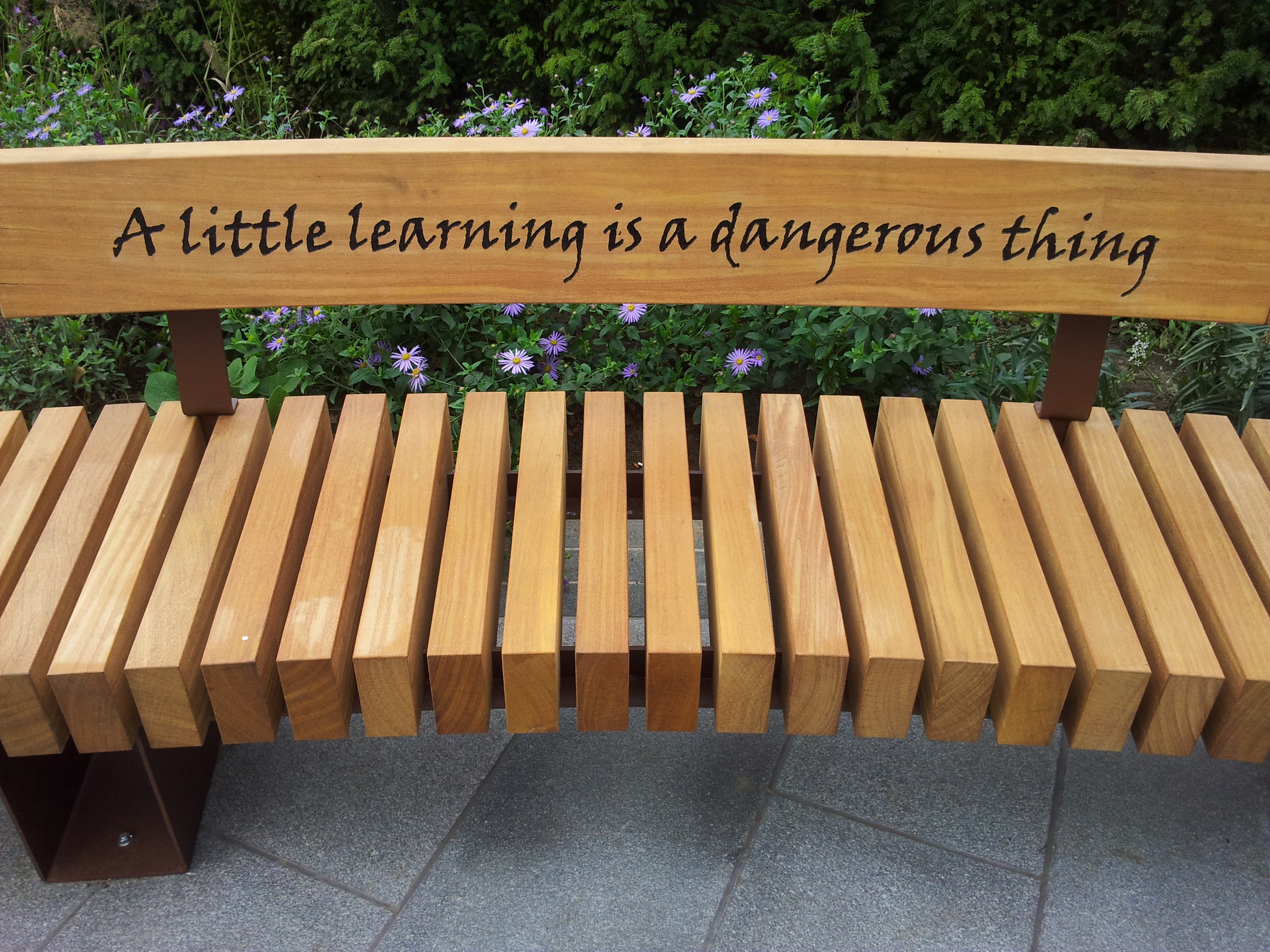
A little learning is a dangerous thing

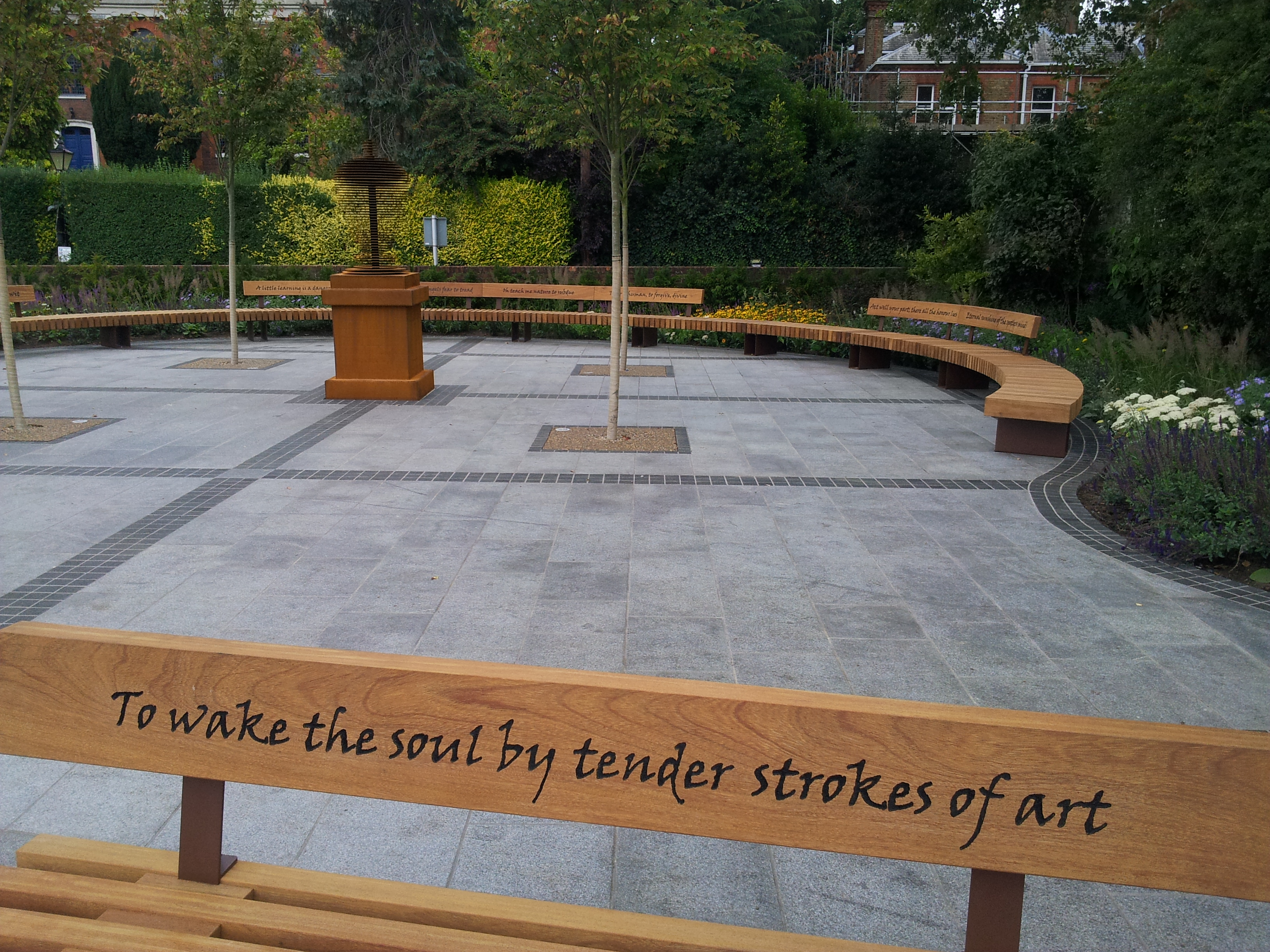
To wake the soul...

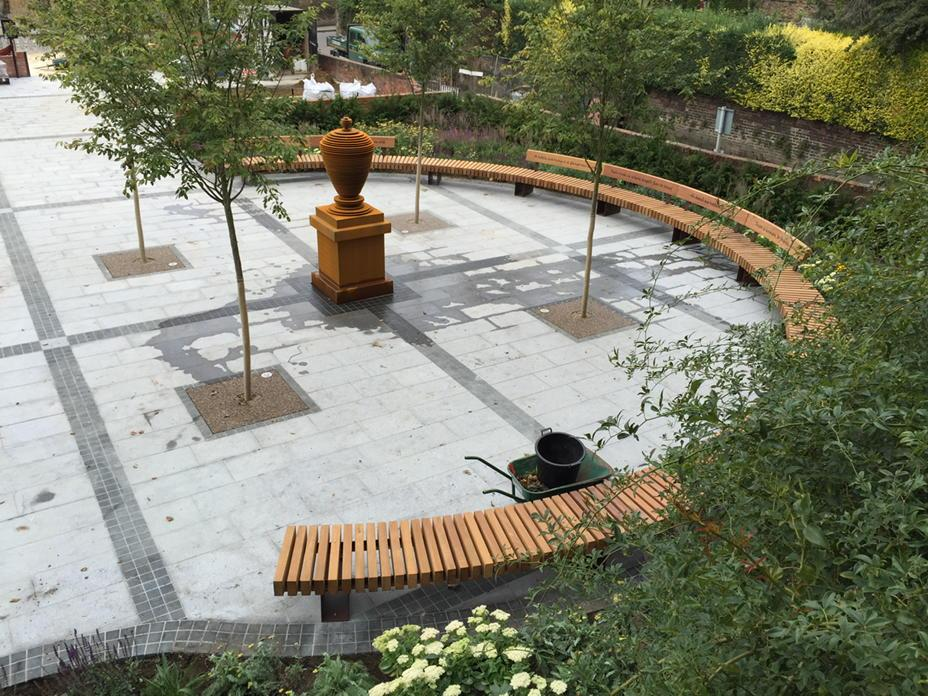
Overhead view

== See also ==
- Graham Henderson
- List of public art in the London Borough of Richmond upon Thames
- Poet in the City
- Alexander Pope
- Pope's villa
