= Rimbaud and Verlaine Foundation =

British charitable organisation

- Formation: 2011
- Dissolved: 2023
- Type: Arts and culture
- Legal status: Registered charity
- Headquarters: London
- Location: Kings Place, King's Cross, London
- Chief Executive: Graham Henderson

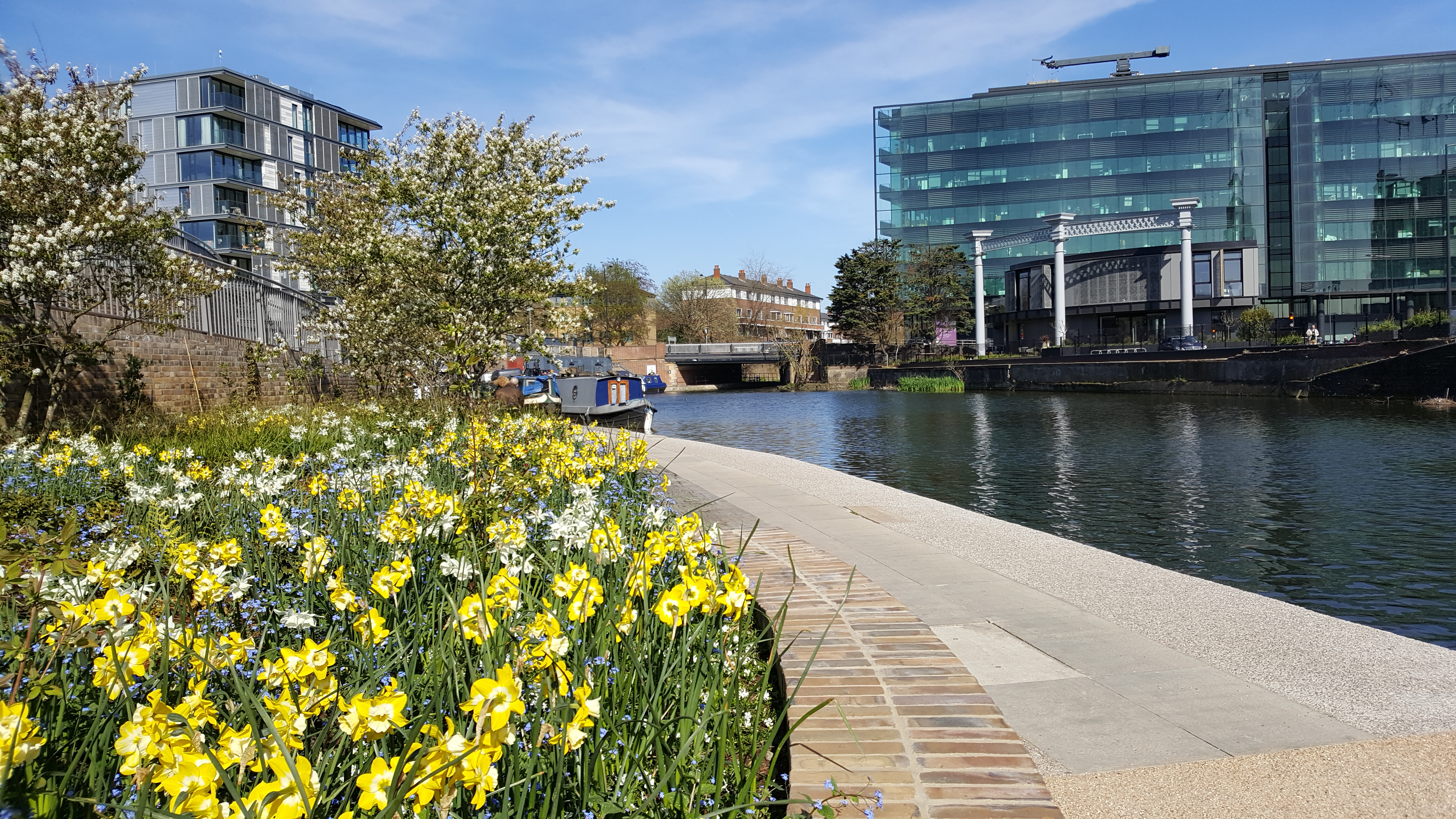
Kings Place from across the canal

The Rimbaud and Verlaine Foundation was a registered charity in the United Kingdom. It was set up in 2011 to take advantage of the gift, in a legacy, of the property at 8 Royal College Street in the London Borough of Camden, the house occupied by the French poets Arthur Rimbaud and Paul Verlaine when they lived in London in 1873. In 2014 it was launched as a new arts organisation and a registered charity.

The Foundation’s long-term aim was to develop 8 Royal College Street as a European-style "poetry house". In the meantime, it used the two poets as an inspirational starting point for a much wider mission to champion arts and culture. Exploring the vital role played by the arts in education, social capital building and cultural exchange, the Foundation also developed a new and more sustainable business model for the arts, based around earned income.

== Governance ==
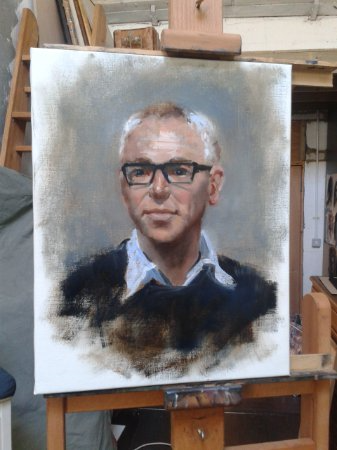
Portrait of Graham Henderson

The Foundation was managed by a board of English-speaking and French-speaking trustees, chaired by Thomas Venning, head of Books and Manuscripts at Christie’s. Its chief executive was Graham Henderson, who was previously chief executive of Poet in the City.

== History ==
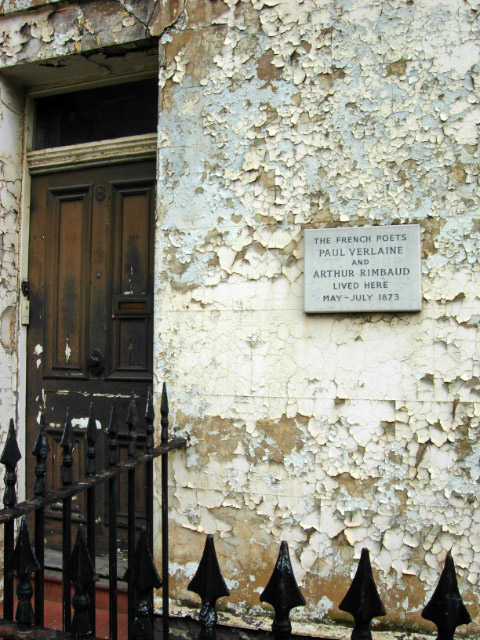
8 Royal College Street in 2007, before restoration

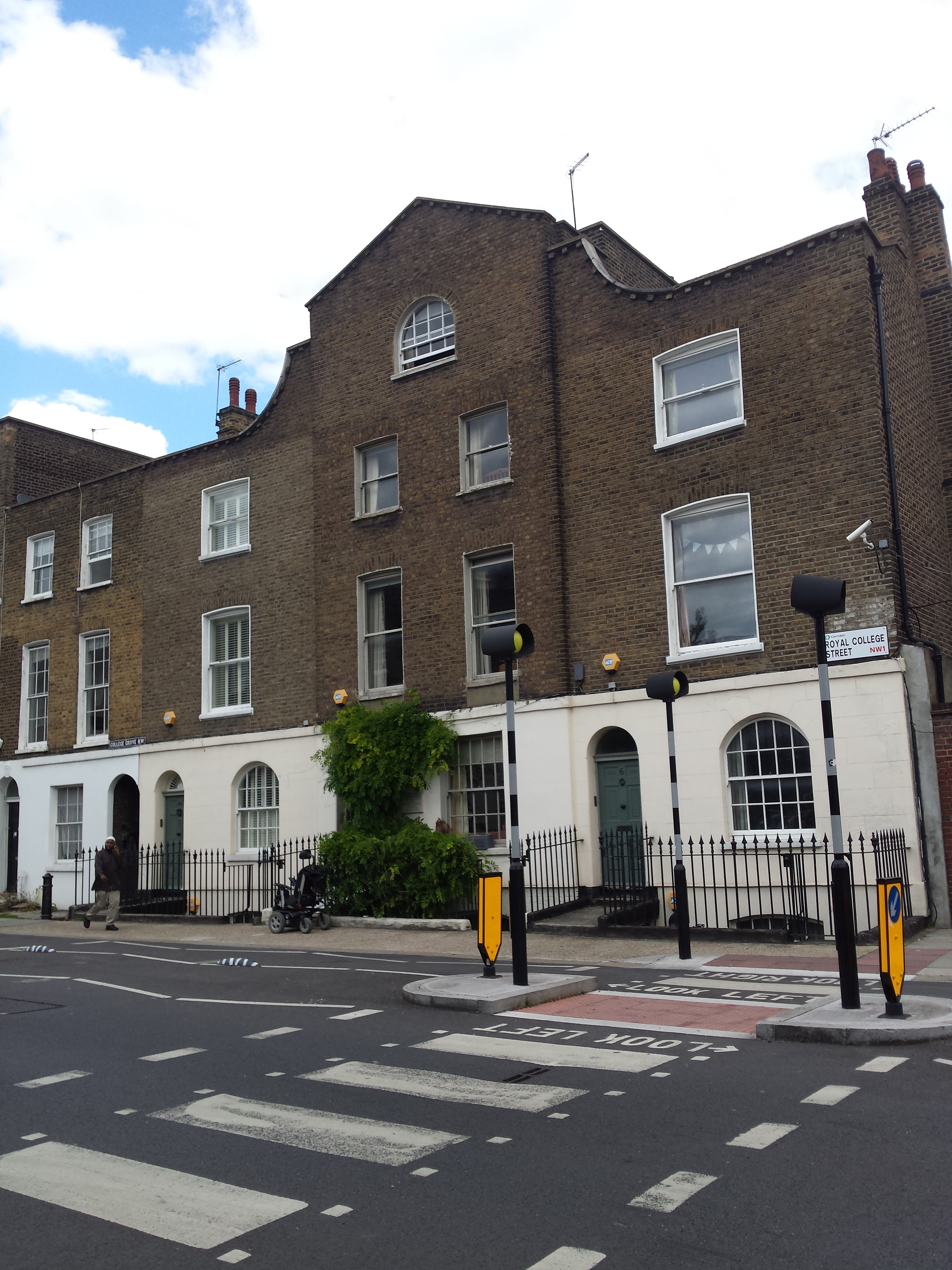
8 Royal College Street in 2015, after restoration

The Foundation was created by Graham Henderson and was initially incubated within Poet in the City. Henderson was part of (and inherited) the previous campaign to save the property at 8 Royal College Street. For many years this was run by Gerry Harrison, a Camden councillor, during the process of which many celebrities rallied to the cause, including the actor Simon Callow, the writers Julian Barnes, Lisa Appignanesi and Tracy Chevalier and the musician Patti Smith.

In 2007 the house was bought and sympathetically restored by a new owner, Michael Corby. Committed to the historic identity of the property, he agreed in 2011 to leave the property as legacy gift to the Rimbaud and Verlaine Foundation, created especially by Graham Henderson for this purpose. The Foundation was always clear, however, that it did not want to be just a small house museum. It therefore used the idea of the "poetry house" to create an arts organisation with the wider goal of promoting culture and the arts and championing their role in social capital building. This saw the Foundation deliver an extensive programme of cross-arts events and commissions and take an innovative approach to audience and business development.

== Events ==
The programme of events delivered by the Foundation was intentionally eclectic, involving many different art forms, and up-and-coming talent from across the arts and cultural sector. Amongst other things this programme has included events featuring opera, classical music, sculpture, poetry, literature, theatre, jazz music and rock music. Highlights included The Disappearing Poet, an event exploring why poets disappear, Faure’s Verlaine Settings, an event presenting classical song settings of the poet’s work, and Rock for Rimbaud, a concert featuring Americana artists. Institutional partners included the National Opera Studio, Bloodaxe Books and Pernod Absinthe. From 2018 the Foundation organised a series of salon-style events at Blacks Club in Soho in London, featuring speakers and artists, and designed to champion its work.

== Commissions ==
The Foundation was also responsible for commissioning new work in the arts. For instance, in 2016 it commissioned both a full-length jazz show (Jazz from the Playing Card Factory) and a full-length theatre show (Poetry House Live). As well as several performances the latter resulted in a full-length film made in partnership with the film department at the Royal Conservatoire of Scotland in Glasgow. The Foundation was also responsible for an original poetry commission involving a suite of poems by George Szirtes, and a series of 24 paintings by the artist Rebecca Taber inspired by the poetry of Rimbaud and Verlaine.

== Educational work ==
The Rimbaud and Verlaine Foundation was committed to encouraging new generations of students in secondary schools in the UK to engage with the arts and literature, and to gain an international perspective. In particular, it sought to engage with young people in local Camden and Islington schools, located within a short distance of the property at 8 Royal College Street, many of whom come from socially and economically deprived backgrounds. The Foundation wanted to provide these young people with experiences and educational opportunities they might otherwise not possess. This charitable mission lay at the heart of the Foundation’s identity, and formed an important part of its contribution to the local community.

In 2017, the Foundation delivered an extensive programme of educational placements featuring poetry in four schools in the London Borough of Camden, working with students from Maria Fidelis Roman Catholic Convent School, Regent High School, Camden School for Girls and La Sainte Union Catholic School in a programme that involved over 500 students. This schools programme was generously supported by the T. S. Eliot Foundation. As well as work in the classroom, it included school shows and the publication of an 89-page poetry anthology entitled How We Make Daylight, featuring work by the students.

The Foundation facilitated a repeat programme of schools’ placements in Camden in 2018, with poetry in translation as its main focus, which was delivered by Modern Poetry in Translation.

== International connections ==
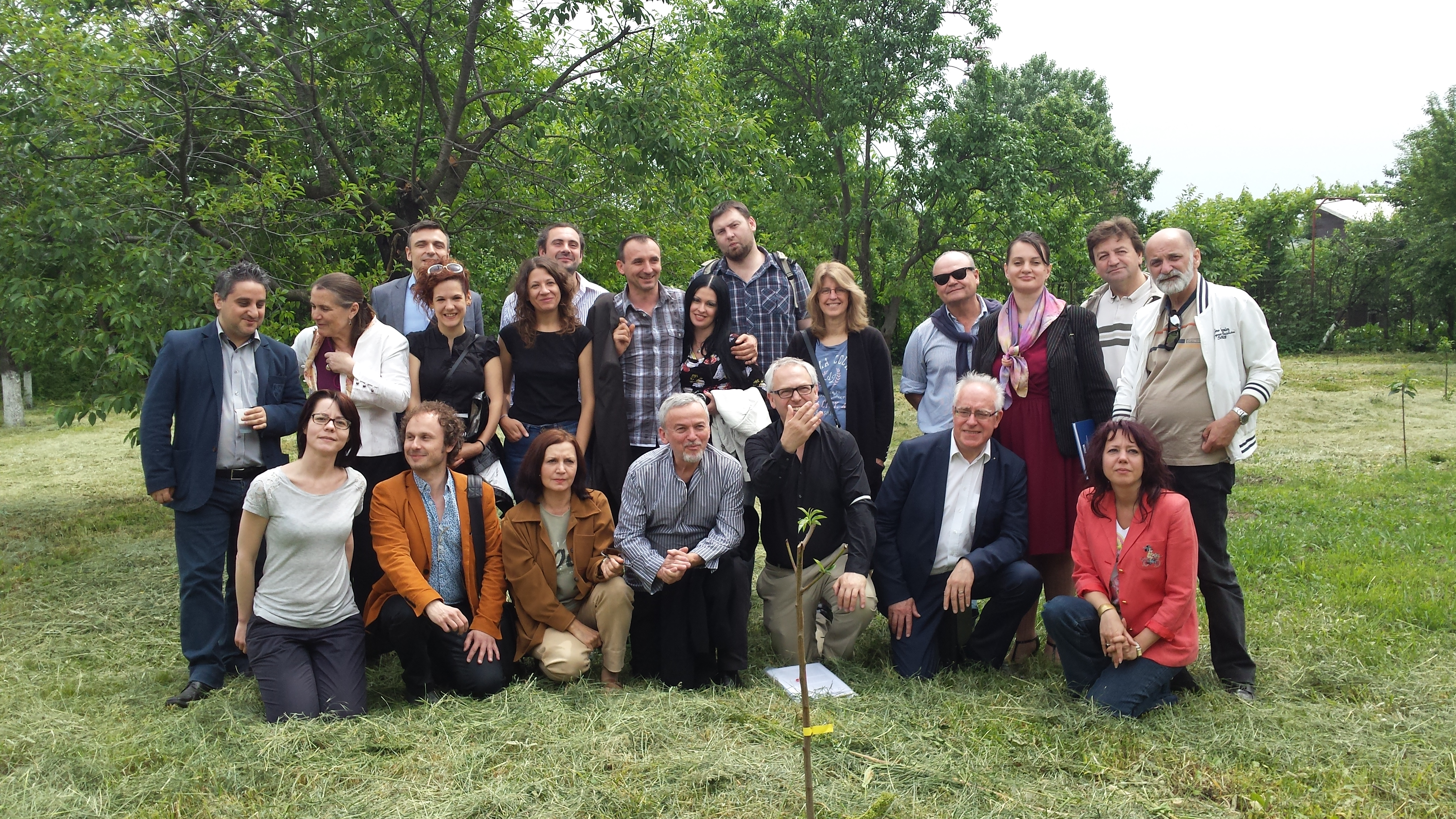
Delegates attending Kindred Spirits conference in Bucharest, 2015

The Foundation also worked internationally. In 2015 Graham Henderson and the organisation took the lead in creating the Kindred Spirits network of European poetry houses including seven arts organisations based in six different European countries. The Foundation’s partners included the Rimbaud Museum in Charleville-Mézières, La Maison de la Poesie in Paris, Residencia de Estudiantes in Madrid, the Lorca Foundation in Granada, the Keats-Shelley House in Rome, the National Museum of Literature in Bucharest, the Druskininkai Poetic Fall festival in Lithuania and the Halldór Laxness Museum in Iceland. The network became a vehicle for an application for a European Union Large Cooperation Grant in the autumn of that year. The Foundation was all set to resubmit its application in 2016, with every chance of success, when the referendum result in favour of Brexit intervened. As a result, the charity's trustees decided that it was no longer sensible to place EU funding at the centre of the organisation’s future strategy. The Foundation, nevertheless, was keen to build on the relationships it had established with its "poetry house" partners, and particularly on the experience of the conference held in Bucharest in May 2015, bringing together representatives from all of the partner organisations. The Poetry House Live theatre show in 2017 was commissioned expressly with the purpose of involving talented up-and-coming playwrights from all of the seven countries involved in the network.

The charity ceased operations in 2023.

== See also ==
- Graham Henderson
- Poet in the City
