= Leonard Irvine =

British Army doctor

Personal information
- Full name: Leonard George Irvine
- Born: 11 January 1906; Bombay, British India
- Died: 27 April 1973 (aged 67); Canterbury, Kent
- Batting: Right-handed
- Bowling: Legbreak
- Role: Bowler

Domestic team information
- Years: Team
- 1926–1928: Cambridge University
- 1927: Kent
- FC debut: 1 May 1926 Cambridge University v Middlesex
- Last FC: 16 June 1928 Cambridge University v Gloucestershire

Career statistics
Competition	First-class
Matches	28
Runs scored	154
Batting average	8.10
100s/50s	0/0
Top score	14*
Balls bowled	3.726
Wickets	98
Bowling average	23.33
5 wickets in innings	7
10 wickets in match	2
Best bowling	7/79
Catches/stumpings	13/–
- Source: CricInfo, 21 November 2017

Colonel Leonard George Irvine (11 January 1906 – 27 April 1973) was a British Army doctor who served in the Royal Army Medical Corps before, during and after World War II. As a young man he played first-class cricket for Cambridge University.

Irvine was born at Bombay in British India in 1906. He was educated at Taunton School and at Sidney Sussex College, Cambridge.

== Cricket career ==
In the freshmen's trial match at Cambridge in 1926 Irvine was the unexpected star: Wisden Cricketers' Almanack noted that much was anticipated from known public school players such as Maurice Turnbull and Bunty Longrigg, but that Irvine took eight wickets for 32 runs in the first innings with his slow legbreaks, and a further three in the second to finish with match figures of 11 for 42.

That performance propelled him into the University First XI for the first game of the season, and his success continued: in the middle of the university cricket season, he took 10 wickets in each of two consecutive matches. In the match against the Free Foresters, he finished with 11 wickets for 145 runs, and his second innings seven for 79 were the best innings figures of his career. The next game against The Army produced 10 wickets for 101 runs. After the Free Foresters game he became the first selection for the University Match against Oxford University that season, five weeks before the actual game. In the event, in the University Match itself, he took only one wicket, but in the 1926 season as a whole he took 52 wickets at a bowling average of 19.59 runs per wicket, and he led Cambridge's bowlers both in terms of number of wickets and average. Wisden noted in its 1927 edition that Irvine was the best bowler in the Cambridge team and, had he played on faster pitches, he "might well have met with still more success".

He played a total of 26 matches for Cambridge and was selected for a second University Match in 1927, taking seven wickets in the game. At the end of the university cricket season he played in one match for an East of England team against the New Zealand touring team and in one game for Kent County Cricket Club's First XI, as well as playing five times for Kent's Second XI in the Minor Counties Championship. In 1928 he played in five games for Cambridge but Wisden reported that he "showed so little of his old form that he had to be dropped from the eleven". He did not appear in first-class cricket after the end of the 1928 season.

== Army career ==
Irvine qualified as a doctor in 1932 when he was awarded MB BChir at Cambridge. He became a Member of the Royal College of Surgeons and Royal College of Physicians in 1933 and was commissioned as a Lieutenant in the Royal Army Medical Corps in July 1933. He served mainly in Egypt and Palestine through the 1930s and by the time World War II began in 1939 he was a Captain.

During the war he served with the BEF in France, on the home front, in the North Africa Campaign and in Italy. He commanded the 2nd Field Ambulance, RAMC in North Africa and 1st Mobile Military Hospital in Italy, rising to the rank of temporary Lieutenant colonel by the end of the war. He was Mentioned in Dispatches in 1944 and was an acting Brigadier for a month after the end of the war. He was Commanding Officer, Military Hospital Wheatley near Oxford between 1951 and 1953 and served in Sudan, Germany, the Middle East, Cyprus and in Britain after the war, retiring in September 1962.

He died suddenly at Bridge near Canterbury in Kent in April 1973 aged 67.

== Bibliography ==
- Carlaw, Derek (2020). Kent County Cricketers, A to Z: Part Two (1919–1939) (PDF). Cardiff: ACS.
