= Taunton School =

Public school in Somerset, England

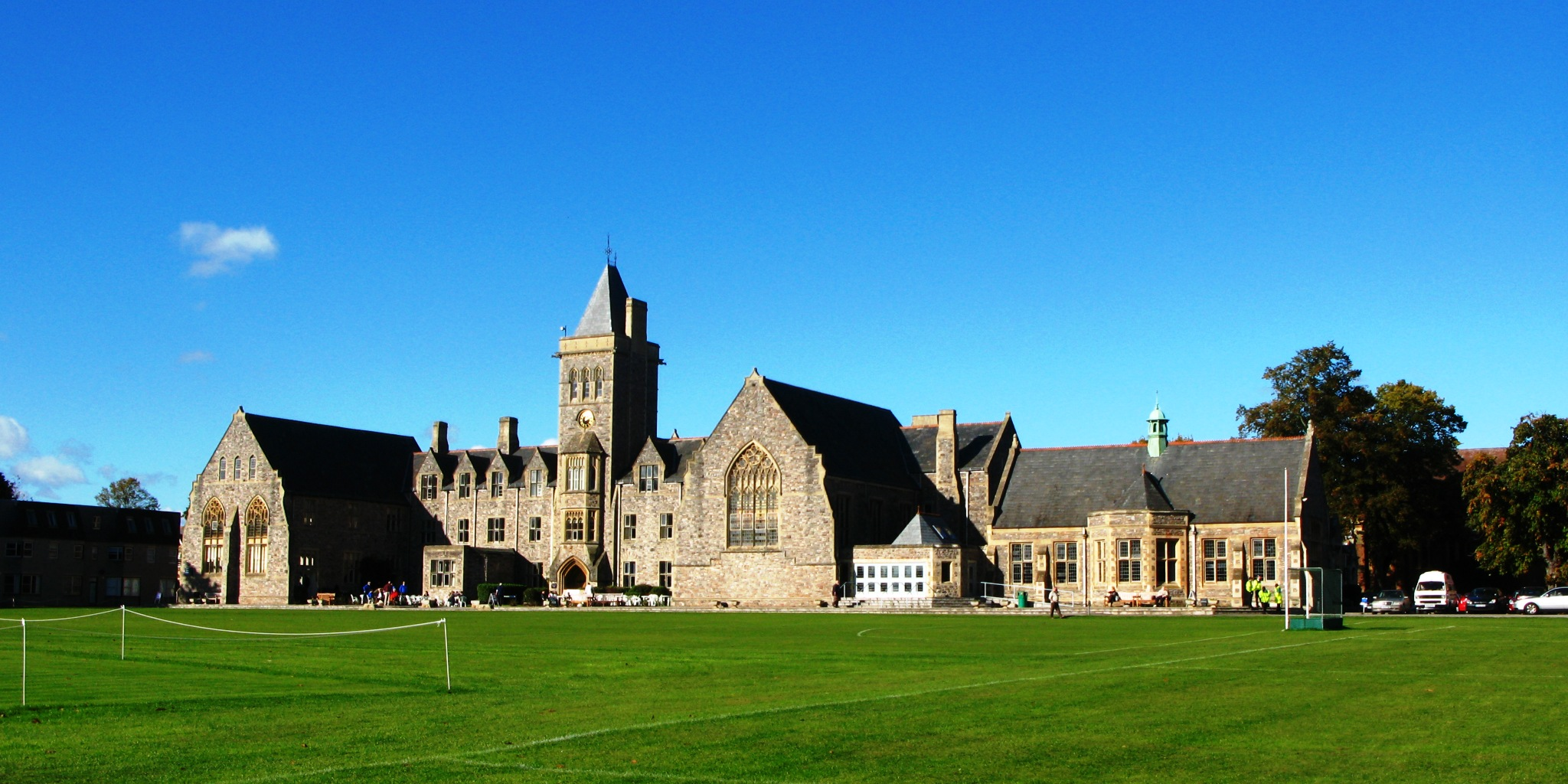

Location
- Staplegrove Road; Taunton, Somerset, TA2 6AD; England
- 51.026282°N 3.115493°W

Information
- Type: Public School; Private school Boarding and Day school
- Motto: Ora et labora - Worship and Work (senior school); Carpe diem - Seize the Day (preparatory school)
- Religious affiliation: Christian
- Established: 1847; 179 years ago
- Ofsted: Reports
- Headmaster: James Johnson
- Gender: Co-educational
- Age: 0 to 18
- Houses: Fairwater, Wills East, Wills West, Weirfield, Woodyer, Evans, Bevan, Goodland, Besley, Marshall, Jenkin, Foxcombe
- Colours: Blue , Red , White
- Alumni: Old Tauntonians
- Website: www.tauntonschool.co.uk

Taunton School is a co-educational public school, in the county town of Taunton in Somerset in South West England. It serves boarding and day-school pupils from the ages of 13 to 18.

The headmaster is James Johnson, appointed in 2022.

The school campus also includes Taunton School International for overseas students; Taunton Preparatory School, serving boarding and day-school pupils aged 7 to 13; Taunton Pre-Prep School, serving day-school pupils aged 4 to 7, and Taunton Nursery, serving pupils aged 0 to 4.

== History ==
Taunton School was founded in 1847 as Independent College, a boys-only school for dissenters - those who were not members of the Church of England.

In the 1870s, the school's governors purchased a site at the northern end of Taunton, on Staplegrove Road. They had built, by Joseph James, a gothic-influenced building, in the prevailing style of the period. The school is constructed in a C-plan, with a 50-foot (15 m) high tower. Grey stone came from Somerset's Mendip Hills. This large building still dominates the school's 90-acre (36 ha) campus today. It is a Grade II listed building.

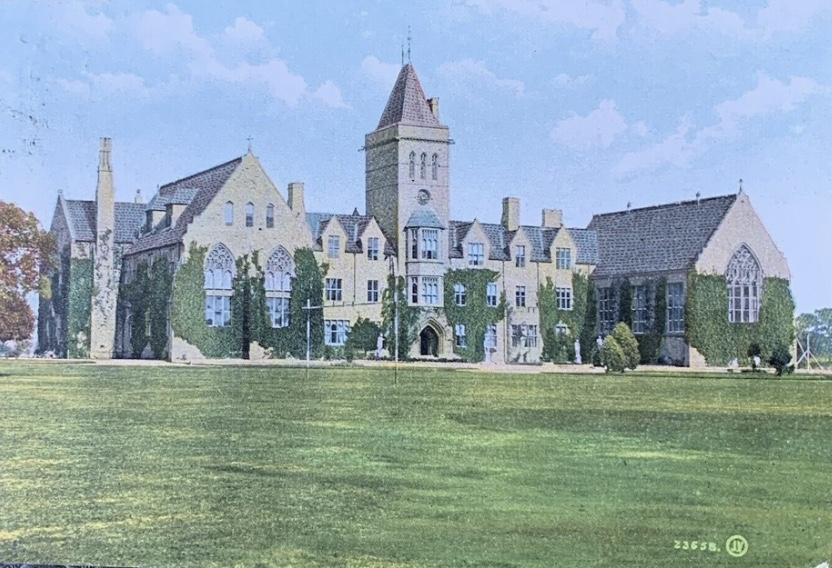
The main school building pictured about 1906

The school was a founding member of the World Individual Debating and Public Speaking Championships and has hosted the tournament numerous times.

A chapel was built in 1907 in contrasting style to the rest of the school. Its sponsor was the wealthy William Wills, 1st Baron Winterstoke. Wills was a director of Bristol-based tobacco firm, W.D. & H.O. Wills. Two features in the chapel were especially of note: the organ and the mosaics. In 2007 on the centenary of the founding of the chapel the original pipe organ was broken up, it being replaced by a new digital organ which was funded in part, by donations from Old Tauntonians.

In September 1971, Taunton School began a merger with Weirfield School, an independent boarding and day school for girls, which was also situated on Staplegrove Road, by admitting girls into the Sixth Form. In 1976 Taunton School completed the merger with the rest of the senior section of Weirfield School. This became one of the earliest fully co-educational independent schools in England. Additional buildings were erected on the original Taunton School campus, and Weirfield continued as a girls-only junior school.

In 1990, in order to create closer links between the two junior schools and Taunton School, Taunton Junior School (originally known as Thone) and Weirfield were renamed Taunton Junior Boys School and Taunton Junior Girls School, respectively. As both Junior Schools needed modernisation, building began in 1993 on the boys' site (Thone) to create a new joint boys and girls school, which was partly financed by the sale of the Weirfield site. In 1994 both schools were located at the Thone site and they were renamed Taunton Preparatory School. A classroom block in the Preparatory School is called Weirfield, as is the main senior girls' Boarding house.

== Notable Old Tauntonians ==
Former pupils of Taunton School are known as Old Tauntonians.

- Aftab Habib, cricketer
- Alan Gibson, cricket writer and broadcaster
- Alan Marshall, cricketer
- Alec Knight, clergyman
- Alexander Waugh, writer
- Alexandra Felstead, reality television star
- Barbara Jefford, actress
- Barry Hobson, cricketer
- Bryon Butler, writer and broadcaster
- Charles Deane, cricketer
- Charles George Gordon, British Army officer, abolitionist and teacher
- Daisy Waugh, writer and journalist
- David Ford, civil servant
- David Jones, director
- Duncan Bluck, businessman
- Edward Aveling, biologist
- Edward Bluemel, actor
- Eric Hill, cricketer
- Evan Durbin, politician
- G. N. W. Thomas, medical doctor and barrister
- Gamal Fahnbulleh, journalist and presenter
- George Andrews, rugby player
- Gerald Chapman, director
- Graham Henderson, cultural entrepreneur
- Harold Fear, cricketer
- Harold Theobald, cricketer
- Harry Simmons, Olympic high jumper
- Henry Wilson, politician
- Howard Shaw, author
- Ian Bryant, academic
- Ian McNeice, actor
- J. M. Gullick, Orientalist
- Jack White, cricketer
- James Frith, politician
- Jay Tidmarsh, businessman
- Jeremy Wright, lawyer and politician
- John Cameron, cricketer
- John Jameson, cricketer
- John Mensah Sarbah, lawyer and politician
- John Rae, educator (Headmaster of Taunton School, 1966-1970) and novelist
- J. M. Roberts, author and historian
- John Whiting, actor
- Jonathan Hall, army officer
- John Mackie, cricketer
- Jonathan Miller, English theatre and opera director, actor, author, television presenter, humourist and physician
- K. R. Norman, philologist
- Leonard Irvine, doctor and cricketer
- Leslie Marshall, cricketer
- Leslie Scott, game designer
- Mark Getty, businessman
- Owen Franklin, organist and composer
- Patrick Newell, actor
- Peter Redgrove, poet
- Peter Green, botanist
- Peter Westmacott, diplomat
- Robert Malpas, engineer and businessman
- Thomas Jameson, cricketer
- Thomas Newton, architect
- Tim Willcox, news presenter
- Tom Abell, cricketer
- W. J. Reader, historian
- William Whitehead, organist

== Academic results ==
A-Level: Percentage of A level students achieving at least 3 A levels at A*-E: 2015 - 84%

International Baccalaureate: The first cohort of students sat the IB Diploma in 2009. Their result ranked the school as the highest IB newcomer in the UK by the Financial Times. In 2010, one student achieved the highest possible mark of 45 points.

GCSE: Percentage of pupils who gained at 5 grades A* - C 2015 - 83%

University progression: Over the past years, some students have gone on to universities including Oxford and Cambridge. Approximately 96% of all Sixth Form leavers take up University or College places.
