= Royal College Street =

Street in the London Borough of Camden

Coordinates: 51°32′25.5″N 0°8′14″W

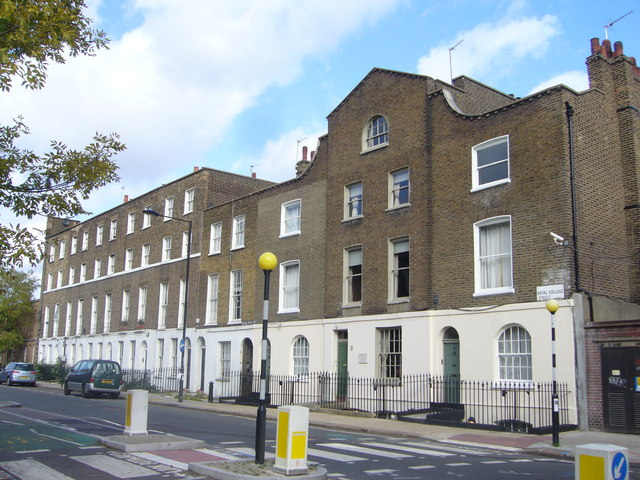
- Houses on Royal College Street
- Interactive map of Royal College Street
- Location: London Borough of Camden, England, United Kingdom
- Postal code: NW1
- Nearest metro station: Camden Town

Other
- Known for: Notable former residents, including the author Charles Dickens and the French poets Arthur Rimbaud and Paul Verlaine

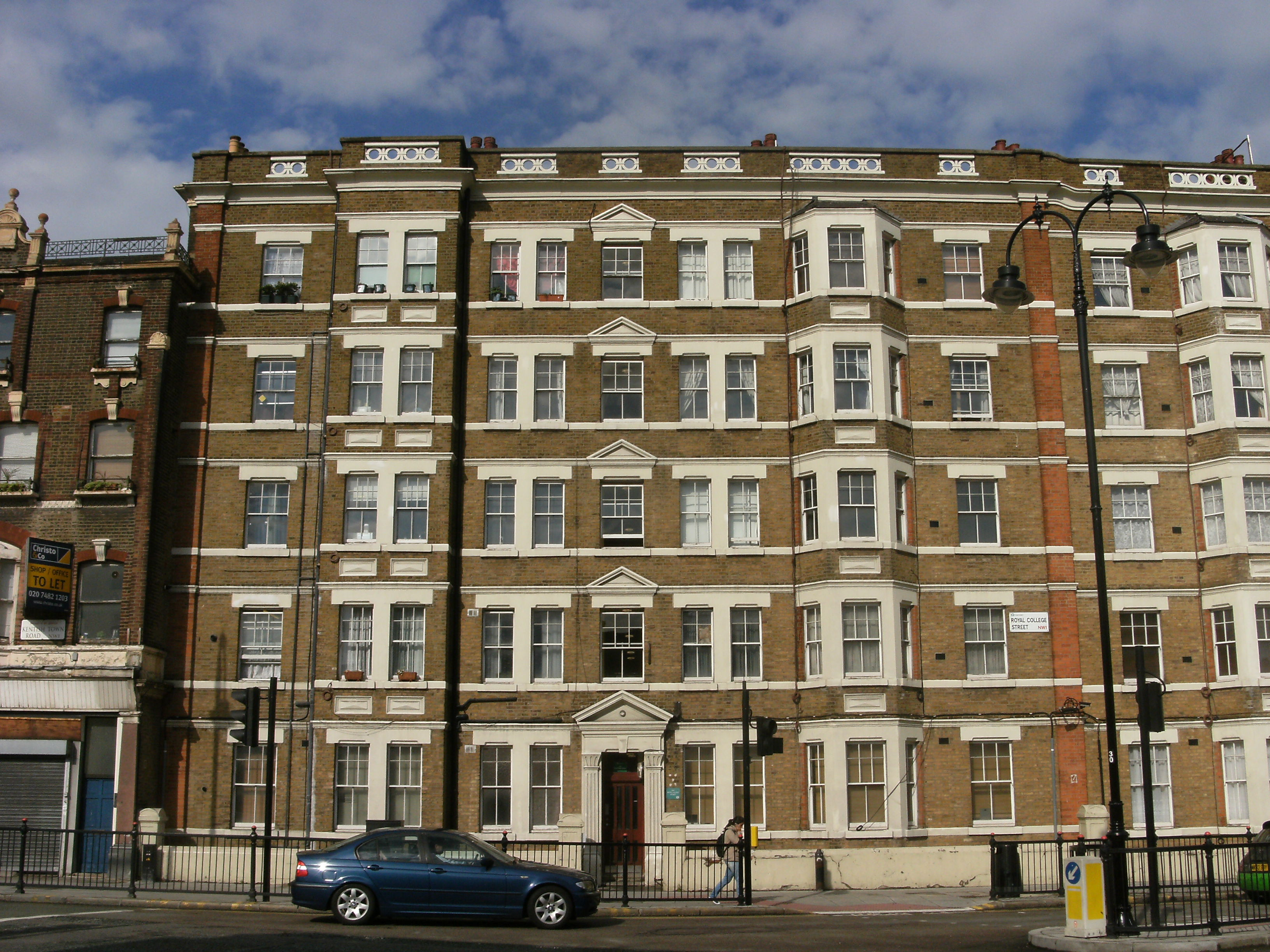
Apartments on Royal College Street

Royal College Street is a major thoroughfare in London, England, within the St Pancras and Somers Town ward in the Borough of Camden. The street, which is one-way, is home to the London headquarters of Parcelforce and the London campus of the Royal Veterinary College, a constituent college of the University of London.

Camden Road railway station is located at the junction of Royal College Street and Camden Road. The nearest London Underground station to Royal College Street is Camden Town which is about five minutes' walk to the south-west along Camden Road.

The Golden Lion public house dates to the 1890s and is located at 88 Royal College Street. It has fought off a number of regeneration attempts although increasingly stands alone amongst newbuild.

Golden Lion in 2005

== Notable residents ==
=== Charles Dickens ===
In 1824 Charles Dickens lived in what is now the upper part of College Place, Camden at No. 112 (the street was then known as Little College Street).

=== Rimbaud and Verlaine ===
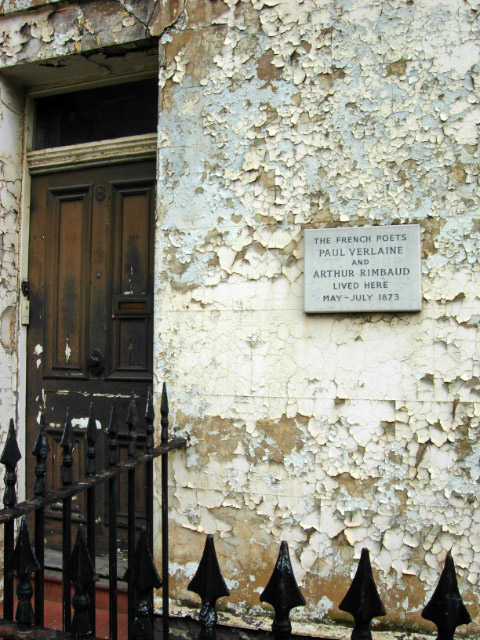
8 Royal College Street in 2007, before restoration

No 8. Royal College Street (then known as Great College Street) was occupied by the French poets Arthur Rimbaud and Paul Verlaine during their celebrated and stormy sojourn in London in 1873.

The Rimbaud and Verlaine Foundation intends to create a "poetry house" at 8 Royal College Street. The Foundation was initiated by Poet in the City, which inherited a campaign to create an Anglo-French cultural centre at Rimbaud and Verlaine's former home. The campaign to save the house was run over many years by Gerry Harrison, a Camden councillor, during the process of which many celebrities have rallied to the cause, including the actor Simon Callow, the writers Julian Barnes, Lisa Appignanesi and Tracy Chevalier and the rock star Patti Smith. In 2007 the house was bought and fully restored by a new owner who agreed to give the house for use as an Anglo-French cultural centre. Poet in the city, and now the Rimbaud and Verlaine Foundation, with the support of the Fondation L-A Finances pour la Poésie in Paris and the law firm Herbert Smith, are seeking to raise money for a maintenance fund, allowing for the creation of a "poetry house" at 8 Royal College Street. However, the house was put up for sale by its owner in November 2020.

== In popular culture ==
Royal College Street also features in the background of the 1956 Alfred Hitchcock film The Man Who Knew Too Much, where actor James Stewart walks from here down Plender Street to 61 College Place.

== See also ==
- Rimbaud and Verlaine Foundation
