= Gerald Chapman (director) =

Gerald Chapman (8 November 1949 – 25 September 1987) was an English theatre director and educator who was best known for his work with the Royal Court Theatre, London, Gay Sweatshop, the New York City Young Playwrights Festival, the American Repertory Theatre, the Circle Repertory Company, and the Double Image Theatre.

== Early life ==
Chapman was born in Torquay, England, the younger son of hotelier Peter Chapman, whose father had been manager of London's Savoy Hotel in the early 1900s. He spent his early years at the Castle Hotel, Taunton, Somerset, where his father was manager, and which is now owned by his elder brother, Christopher (Kit) Chapman. His mother was of Greek origin, and his summers were spent with his mother's family in Thessalonica.

== Dramatic career ==
Gerald Chapman appeared in several school drama productions when he was a pupil at Taunton School, (along with his contemporary Ian McNeice), and began his involvement with play production as a student at Cambridge University.

In 1974, at a time when Gay Liberation was just beginning in the UK, Chapman joined other gay activists and playwrights to set up one of the first Gay Theatre seasons in the UK. The intention of the group was to counteract the prevailing conception in mainstream theatre of what homosexuals were like, therefore providing a more realistic image for the public. They realised that a great deal of hard work was required and came up with the name The Gay Sweatshop. This later became one of the best known gay theatre companies in the UK, with former members including Antony Sher, Simon Callow, Tom Robinson and Miriam Margolyes.

In the mid-1970s Chapman was appointed to the Royal Court Theatre, London, in charge of the Young People's Theatre Scheme. This had originally been set up in 1966 to develop and produce the best new writing by young people under 25, encouraging writers from all sections of society to find their voice. In 1976, as part of a drive to invigorate the group, Chapman developed the YPTS idea and held a competition to give the group a shorter and snappier name. The winning name chosen was "The Activists"; the logo of which was the letter "A" formed of nails, to signifying the driving edge and hard grittiness that typified the group's work. This group had two main branches of activity – the first was a mainstream group that worked with influential writers and directors such as Edward Bond, John Schlesinger, Max Stafford-Clark and many others. The second group was formed as part of an offshoot of the radical theatre company Gay Sweatshop, with which Chapman had worked previously. Together with South African writer David Lan, workshop sessions were held with a group of gay teenagers to develop a play that would eventually become a touring production called Not in Norwich (see the following web-link). This highly controversial show (for the time) aroused deep press hostility, which resulted in a front-page story in the London Evening Standard: "London Children in Sex Play". In contrast to the sensationalist press stories (the play actually contained no sexual scenes whatsoever, and the so-called "children" were all, at the time, actors in their late teens), the play itself was constructed from the real life personal experiences of young British gay teenagers, containing as it did, examples of the difficulties, prejudice and considerable humour of those that took part. The Royal Court, through Chapman and then director Ann Jenkins, fought against a largely hostile press to maintain the integrity of the production, which successfully played at the Royal Court as well as on tours to regional theatres and schools. It was pioneering work of this kind that became a hallmark of Chapman's career, before it was cut so tragically short in 1987. He also taught school, ran workshops, and organised the highly successful Young Playwrights' annual festival.

Stephen Sondheim had been attempting for several years, without success, to set up a young playwright's competition in New York City. He heard about the program at the Royal Court and went to England to see for himself:

“It was my first opportunity to see what I had only read about for so many years, and it was an experience so moving and exhilarating that I returned to the council with renewed vigor. I wrote to Robert Cushman, The Observer′s theatre critic, to find out exactly how the event was organized, and asked Ruth Goetz, a council-member who lived in London at the time, to do some detective work at the Court. She came up with the key to it all: a fellow named Gerald Chapman”.

In 1980 Sondheim invited Chapman to New York to start a similar project in the United States as the Foundation of the Dramatists Guild and now known as Young Playwrights Inc. Chapman founded and directed the acclaimed New York Young Playwrights Festival, which won a Drama Critics Circle Award in 1983. In 1984 he directed the world premiere of the play Holy Wars – Morocco and The Road to Jerusalem by Allan Havis, at the American Repertory Theatre. He also taught at New York University, worked in New York City schools, and directed productions at the American Repertory Theatre, the Circle Repertory Company, and the Double Image Theatre.

In 1985 he was invited to be Guest Director at the International Young Playwright's Festival in Sydney. In 1986 he was invited by artistic director Toby Robertson to direct Claw by Howard Barker at Theatr Clwyd; the production was mounted on the theatre’s second stage and then toured Wales.

== Death and legacy ==
Gerald Chapman died of AIDS on 25 September 1987 at the Beth Israel Medical Center, New York City. His life partner, Ivan Chatman, was by his side. The New York Times published a substantial obituary and there were long eulogies in the deaths columns from his friends and colleagues at the Dramatists Guild. After his death The Gerald Chapman Trainee Director Award was set up at the Royal Court Theatre, London.

== Published work ==
In 1990, his book Teaching Young Playwrights (edited and developed by Lisa A. Barnett) was published posthumously by Heinemann. It won The American Alliance for Theatre and Education (AATE) Distinguished Book Award in 1991 and has since been acknowledged as a seminal work.

== References and external links ==
- Weblink to further information on The Activists – Actor Gary James
- Kit Chapmen, An Innkeeper's Diary, London:> Weidenfeld & Nicolson, 1999. (ISBN 0297824600)
- Gay Sweatshop Archives
- Introduction to the YPI by Stephen Sondheim
- AATE Award winners
