= G. N. W. Thomas =

British medical doctor and barrister

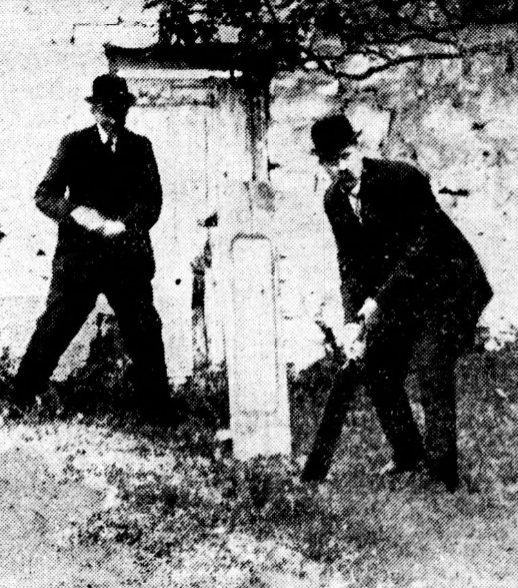
- G. N. W. Thomas (left) with James Robinson, Lord Mayor of Cardiff in 1914
- Born: George Nathaniel William Thomas; 23 August 1873; Dartmouth
- Died: 9 February 1958 (aged 84); Penarth
- Occupations: Medical doctor, barrister
- Spouse: Frances Helena (m. 1904)

George Nathaniel William Thomas (23 August 1873 – 9 February 1958) was an English medical doctor, barrister and anti-vivisection activist.

== Career ==
Thomas was born in Dartmouth. He was educated at Taunton School and obtained his M.B. from Edinburgh University. He was the son and grandson of a Nonconformist minister. Thomas worked in Cardiff before WW1 as a member of the Cardiff City Council and was chairman of the Cardiff Corporation Food and Fuel Committee during the war. He was a medical officer at Wilts County Mental Hospital in Devizes from 1922 to 1938. He retired in 1938 and returned to Cardiff.

Thomas was a barrister of the Middle Temple. He was a trustee of the oldest nonconformist chapel in Wales, the Tabernacle Independent Chapel in Llanvaches. He married Frances Helena. Thomas was an anti-fascist. In 1936, he delivered a speech against the British Union of Fascists defending Jews and requesting for Parliament to pass an act to stop any person maligning any section of the community. Thomas was described as "staunchly philosemitic" as he was known to have spoken in defence of Jews at the pulpit.

Thomas died on 9 February 1958 in Penarth. He was buried at Trellech Cemetery.

== Anti-vivisection ==
Thomas was an anti-vivisectionist. He was a speaker for the Cardiff branch of the British Union for the Abolition of Vivisection, commenting that "in long drawn out agony" animal experiments were cruel and unnecessary. Thomas argued that the greatest advances from medical science such as discoveries of anaesthetics, anti-septic surgery, radium and treatments of malaria and yellow fever came from scientific experiments without cruelty to animals.

He was an opponent of blood sports. In 1927, he wrote a letter to the League for the Prohibition of Cruel Sports commenting that "blood sports are atrociously cruel and unfair to the animal, and degrading to those who take part in them". Thomas was an honorary member of the Animal Defence and Anti-Vivisection Society.

== Selected publications ==
- Thomas, G. N. W. (1913). Leading Cases in Workmen's Compensation. London: Butterworth & Co.
- Thomas, G. N. W. (1924). "Honey: Its Value in Heart Failure". The Lancet. 204 (5287): 1363.
- Thomas, G. N. W. (1949). "Animal Experiments". The British Medical Journal. 1 (4599): 369. JSTOR 25371407.
