= Harold Fear =

English cricketer

Personal information
- Full name: Harold Percival Fear
- Born: 16 April 1908; Finchley, Middlesex, England
- Died: 13 May 1943 (aged 35); Bishop's Hull, Taunton, Somerset, England
- Batting: Right-handed
- Role: Batsman

Domestic team information
- Years: Team
- 1934: Somerset
- FC debut: 30 May 1934 Somerset v Sussex
- Last FC: 17 July 1934 Somerset v Lancashire

Career statistics
Competition	First-class
Matches	2
Runs scored	28
Batting average	9.33
100s/50s	0/0
Top score	23
Balls bowled	18
Wickets	0
Bowling average	–
5 wickets in innings	–
10 wickets in match	–
Best bowling	–
Catches/stumpings	0/–
- Source: CricketArchive, 22 February 2011

Harold Percival Fear (16 April 1908 – 13 May 1943) played first-class cricket for Somerset in two matches in 1934. He was born at Finchley, Middlesex and died at Bishop's Hull, Taunton, Somerset.

Educated at Taunton School, Fear was a right-handed middle-order batsman. He made 23 in the second innings of his first match when Somerset were made to follow on by Sussex, and that was his highest first-class score. In his only other first-class appearance he made five against Lancashire in a high-scoring match.
