= Charles Deane (cricketer) =

English cricketer

Personal information
- Full name: Charles Gerrard Deane
- Born: 8 March 1885; Oakhill, Somerset, England
- Died: 14 December 1914 (aged 29); Multan, Pakistan (then India)
- Batting: Right-handed
- Bowling: Right-arm medium
- Role: Batsman

Domestic team information
- Years: Team
- 1907–1913: Somerset
- First-class debut: 27 May 1907 Somerset v Sussex
- Last First-class: 1 July 1913 Somerset v Yorkshire

Career statistics
Competition	First-class
Matches	36
Runs scored	753
Batting average	11.95
100s/50s	–/2
Top score	78
Balls bowled	284
Wickets	8
Bowling average	25.75
5 wickets in innings	–
10 wickets in match	–
Best bowling	2/36
Catches/stumpings	25/–
- Source: CricketArchive, 16 September 2010

Charles Gerrard Deane (8 March 1885 – 14 December 1914) played first-class cricket for Somerset from 1907 to 1913. He was born at Oakhill, Somerset and died at Multan, then in India, now in Pakistan.

Educated at Taunton School, Deane was a middle or lower order right-handed batsman and an occasional right-arm medium-pace bowler. He played fairly regularly for Somerset in the poor season of 1907, though his batting average in 14 matches was only 10.91 and his highest score was just 47. The figures for half a dozen matches in 1908 were even worse, and he did not play in 1909.

In 1910 he returned and scored exactly 50 in the first innings of the match with Lancashire at Old Trafford; he also took the wicket that broke a second-wicket stand of 295 made in 130 minutes between Alfred Hartley and Johnny Tyldesley in Lancashire's innings. The following year, 1911, Deane made his highest score with 78 in a high-scoring match against Hampshire at Southampton. He did not play after the end of June 1911, and limited appearances in 1912 and 1913 were not successful.

According to his obituary in Wisden's 1915 edition, Deane died of "fever" while serving in India with the "1st Detachment of the 5th Devon Territorials". The 5th battalion had arrived at Karachi on 11 November and had been deployed to Multan, where Deane died.
