= W. J. Reader =

English historian (1920-1990)

William Joseph Reader (20 November 1920 – 5 June 1990) was an English historian who specialised in British company history. Theo Barker described him as "the foremost British company historian of his day".

== Life ==
Born in Weston-super-Mare, Reader attended Taunton School before going up to Jesus College, Cambridge to read history. During the Second World War he served in the Royal Signals Corps.

Reader worked at Unilever in advertising, market research and public relations roles from 1950 to 1964. He left the company to become a freelance historian, and went on to write well-received histories of Imperial Chemical Industries, Grand Metropolitan and Weir Group, among others.
