= Leslie Marshall (cricketer) =

English cricketer

Personal information
- Full name: Leslie Phillips Marshall
- Born: 25 January 1894; Tripatur, Chennai, India
- Died: 28 February 1978 (aged 84); Taunton, Somerset, England
- Nickname: "LP"
- Batting: Right-handed
- Role: Batsman
- Relatives: Brother Alan

Domestic team information
- Years: Team
- 1913–31: Somerset
- First-class debut: 30 June 1913 Somerset v Yorkshire
- Last First-class: 9 June 1931 Somerset v New Zealanders

Career statistics
Competition	First-class
Matches	11
Runs scored	162
Batting average	8.52
100s/50s	–/–
Top score	37
Balls bowled	24
Wickets	1
Bowling average	16.00
5 wickets in innings	–
10 wickets in match	–
Best bowling	1/7
Catches/stumpings	6/–
- Source: CricketArchive, 11 July 2010

Leslie Phillips Marshall MC MD TD (25 January 1894 – 28 February 1978) was an English first-class cricketer who played for Somerset between 1913 and 1931. He was born at Chennai, India, then called Madras, and died at Taunton, Somerset.

Educated at Taunton School, Marshall played in three first-class matches for Somerset at the age of 19 in 1913, but a score of 26 against Derbyshire was his only success. His schooling was interrupted in 1914 when he joined the British forces serving overseas. He was discharged at the end of the war after receiving shrapnel wounds to the leg and buttock. He then made one first-class appearance in each of the 1914, 1919, 1926 and 1928 seasons, making little impact and, while a student at Cambridge University, he also appeared in one of the non-first-class trials matches in 1919, though he did not appear for the University side in any first-class games.

In 1931, he returned for four matches, the most he played in any one season, and in his final match, against the New Zealanders, he twice improved his highest score, made 18 years earlier, with 29 in the first innings and 37 in the second.

== Family and life outside cricket ==
His brother Alan also played for Somerset between 1914 and 1931. He also had a brother Basil and a sister (?) who died in childhood. Following service in the First World War, Marshall qualified as a physician. and in 1931 married Catherine Mary (née Hext) who also qualified as a doctor. He and Mary had two sons, William Hext Marshall (1933), who became a doctor and Hugh Marshall (1934), who became a vicar. In 1936, they had a son who was stillborn. In 1937, he was awarded a Doctor of Medicine degree at Cambridge University. He lived in Tan House in Blagdon Hill just outside Taunton from World War II until the end of his life. His wife survived him by three years. She died on 16 February 1981.
