= William Reader (priest) =

William Reader (1704-1774) was Archdeacon of Cork from 1745 until his death.

Reader was born in Dublin and educated at Trinity College, Dublin. He held living at Nohoval, Kilmonoge, and Dunisky. He was also Prebendary of Rathcoony in Cork from 1732 to 1745.
