= William Reader (painter) =

English portrait painter

- Born: Maidstone, England
- Died: London, England
- Occupation: Portrait painter

William Reader (fl. 1680) was an English portrait painter.

== Biography ==
Reader was born in Maidstone. He was a pupil of Gerard Soest. Reader was the son of a clergyman at Maidstone, and was for a long time patronised by a wealthy nobleman in the west of England. He is chiefly known by a portrait of Dr. John Blow, which was engraved in mezzotint by T. Beckett. There are no doubt other portraits by him under the names of more eminent artists. Reader died in poor circumstances as a pensioner at the London Charterhouse.
