= Poet in the City =

London-based arts organisation

- Formation: 1998 (as a project of the Poetry Society); an independent charity since 2006
- Type: Arts and education
- Legal status: Registered charity
- Purpose: Creating new audiences for poetry through an eclectic programme of events, commissions and education work
- Headquarters: King's Cross, London
- Location: Kings Place Music Foundation, 90 York Way, London N1 9AG
- Interim Chief Executive: Katie Matthews
- Budget: £240,000
- Staff: 3
- Volunteers: 75
- Website: www.poetinthecity.co.uk

Poet in the City is a London-based arts organisation founded in 1998 as a project of the Poetry Society; it became an independent charity in 2006.

Poet in the City collaborates with partners from the arts and beyond, from the Barbican Centre, Kings Place and the Royal Opera House to St Paul's Cathedral, the Francis Crick Institute and St Pancras International. It creates new audiences for poetry and works with audiences of all ages, with different interests and backgrounds, and across sectors.

Poet in the City was awarded National Portfolio Organisation status in April 2011, in 2014 and again in 2017, meaning the organisation will receive regular funding from Arts Council England 2018 to 2022. It operates a mixed funding model, combining private and business philanthropy, earned income and public subsidy.

== Events ==
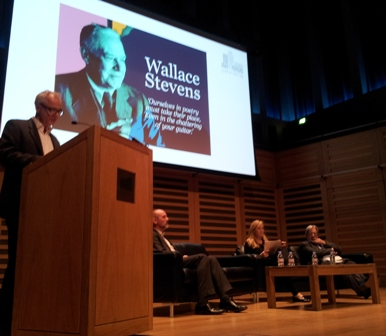
Poet in the City event on Wallace Stevens at Kings Place, London on 17 November 2014

Since 2008, Poet in the City has held about a dozen events per year at Kings Place, the arts venue just north of King's Cross. The organisation's events have included Courtly Love – poetry from the palaces of the Maharajahs, events with Poet Laureate Carol Ann Duffy, Seamus Heaney, celebrations of "late great poets" including John Keats, Hafez, Thomas Hardy, Elizabeth Bishop and Robert Lowell, and foreign language poetry events. Its largest event, Under the Skin, was held at St. Paul's Cathedral in 2016.

In 2016, Poet in the City began to expand its work beyond London, programming events at Manchester's Royal Exchange Theatre and HOME.

In 2017, Poet in the City partnered with CLPE and Year 5 pupils from three primary schools in East London to co-curate a live poetry event at Stratford Circus Arts Centre.

== Poetry & Lyrics Festival ==
Since 2016 Poet in the City has been curating an annual two-day music festival at Kings Place that aims to bring great lovers of poetry and music together. Spanning multiple genres and art forms, Poetry & Lyrics Festival explores stories across the lyrical landscape through live performances, immersive encounters and workshops. Headliners and notable acts include Cerys Matthews, Don Paterson, PJ Harvey, Don Black, John Hegley, Steve Lamacq, Murray Lachlan Young, Katie Melua, the Afrikan Revolution, Deanna Rodger, Kayo Chingonyi, and Jackie Oates.

== Recent commissions ==
=== Collections in Verse (ongoing) ===
Collections in Verse is a collaborative project with the British Library. Poet in the City is commissioning new poetry in cities across England to tell the story of British Library exhibitions. Libraries in Leeds, Newcastle, Sheffield, Reading and Exeter are hosting live poetry events.

- Collections in Verse: Leeds (Malika Booker, Khadijah Ibrahim and Vahni Capildeo)
- Collections in Verse: Sheffield (Rachel Bower, Kayo Chingonyi and Joe Kriss)
- Collections in Verse: Newcastle (Degna Stone, Ellen Moran and Sky Hawkins)

=== MEMENTO (2017) ===
Poet in the City partnered with BioNano Consultancy and Aurora Orchestra in a collaboration by poet Frances Leviston, composer Martin Suckling and scientists to create new work inspired by the PETMEM (Piezoelectronic Transduction Memory Device) technology, which premiered on 15 October 2017 as part of BBC Radio 3's Memory Weekender at the Wellcome Collection, and was then performed to a live audience at Kings Place in January 2018 as part of its Time Unwrapped season.

=== Deconstructing Patterns (2017) ===
In partnership with the Francis Crick Institute, Poet in the City worked with poet Sarah Howe and sound artist Chu-Li Shewring to create a piece around a new development in exploring scientific patterns to learn more about human biology.

=== Under the Skin (2016) ===
In collaboration with St Paul's Cathedral, Poet in the City commissioned five contemporary poets – Deanna Rodger, Inua Ellams, Anthony Anaxagorou, Patience Agbabi and Kei Miller, to lift the lid on St Paul's, its history and its place in the public imagination. These new works span first encounters and famous names, revolution and regeneration, as part of a wider project to reconnect modern Londoners with the cathedral. The poetry was performed live for the first time at a free event at the cathedral.

Following the live event, an audio exhibition was launched, mapping the poetry onto the physical canvas of St Paul's and allowing the listener to rediscover the work in an all-new binaural experience online.

=== Through the Door (2014) ===
A project from Archives for London and Poet in the City, Through the Door aimed to engage new audiences for poetry, archives and local history. Seven leading UK poets, including Sir Andrew Motion and David Harsent, were commissioned to write new poems inspired by stories and documents from within seven London archives. Subjects as diverse as the damage to St Paul's Cathedral during the London blitz and the diary of a gravedigger at the Royal College of Surgeons led to new poetry and the re-discovery of related archive materials.

An anthology collection of all the poetry written as part of the project was published. Each poet returned to their respective archives for special public readings, providing an opportunity for local communities to engage with their archives, and hear the poetry performed live for the first time.

== Poet in the City Producers ==
Launched in 2015, Poet in the City Producers is a group of 16–25-year-olds producing events for high-profile venues as part of Poet in the City's programme and advising on engagement with new audiences. Poet in the City provides leadership training, industry skills workshops, networking opportunities and creative experiences to progress careers.

Poet in the City Producers have curated events and podcasts focusing on social issues and using poetry as a platform to facilitate discussions on a wide range of topics such as feminism in hip hop, Utopia, power dynamics within the media and issues surrounding body image.

== History and organisation ==
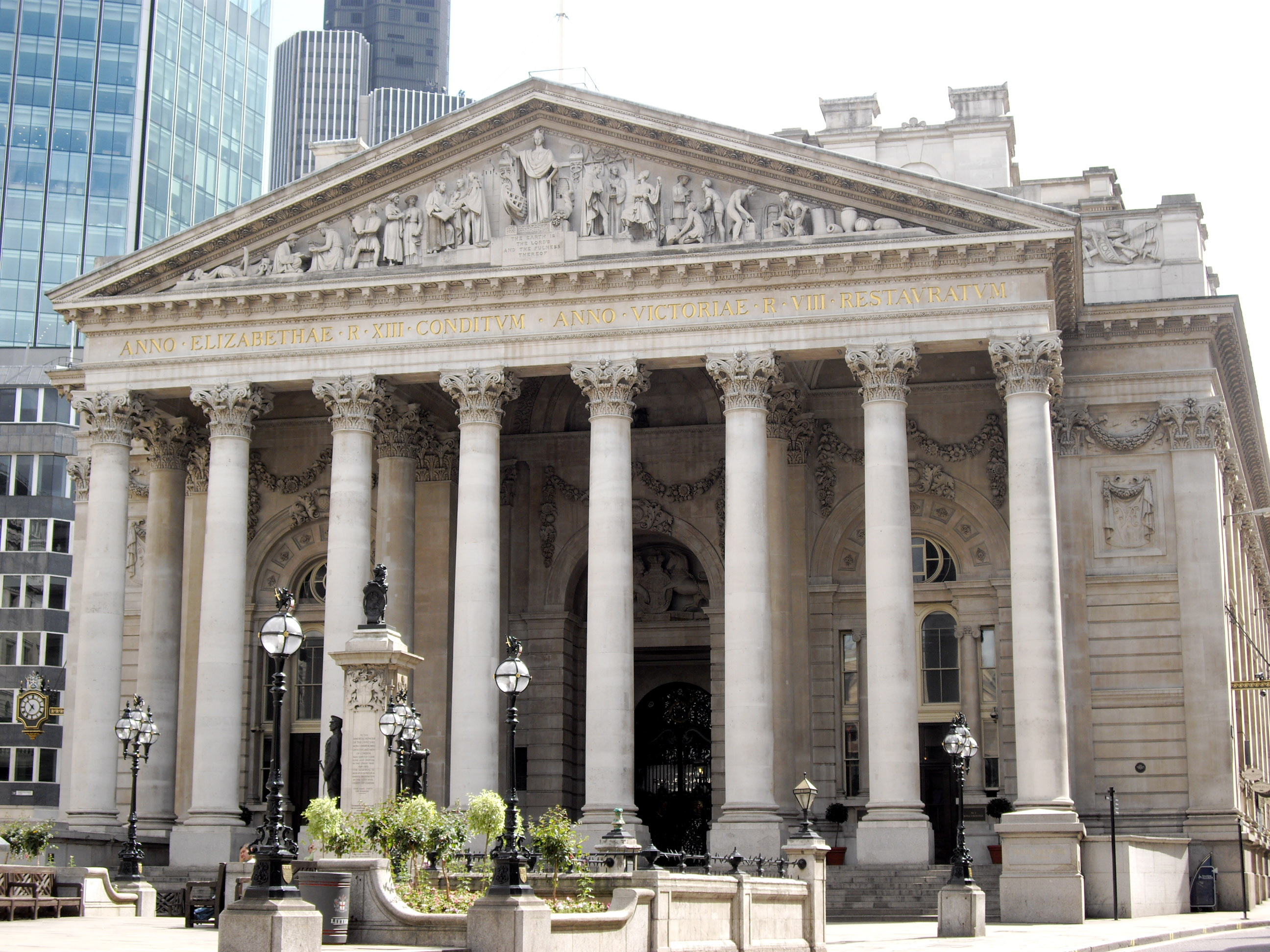
Royal Exchange, London

Poet in the City was founded in 1998 as a project of the Poetry Society, by Rosamund McCarthy, a lawyer at Bates Wells Braithwaite. It involved a number of City of London-based organisations, mainly law firms, in an annual fund-raising effort. Monies raised were used to deliver schools visits, placing poets in the classroom, and encouraging pupils to read and write poetry. Early successes included a John Donne event at the Chapter House of St Paul's Cathedral and an open-air event on the steps of the Royal Exchange on National Poetry Day.

Poet in the City is managed by a board of trustees chaired by Sarah Davis. Its interim Chief Executive is Katie Matthews.

The organisation is supported by a panel of corporate organisations that provide in-kind support and ad-hoc sponsorship and it operates a Friends' scheme whereby individuals can support its work.

Poet in the City has five patrons, the human rights lawyer Baroness Helena Kennedy QC, the poets Andrew Motion, Wendy Cope and Jo Shapcott, and the actress Juliet Stevenson.

Poet in the City has a volunteer community with more than 75 active volunteers who are involved in a range of activities including event management, marketing, film production, blogging and front-of-house roles.

A dedicated audio team conducts interviews with the poets, speakers, actors and musicians featured in the events for Poet in the City's audio archive.

== See also ==
- Graham Henderson
- Pope's Urn
- Rimbaud and Verlaine Foundation
