= Alan Marshall (cricketer) =

Indian-born English cricketer

Personal information
- Full name: Alan George Marshall
- Born: 17 April 1895; Tripatur, Chennai, India
- Died: 14 May 1973 (aged 78); Pettistree, Woodbridge, Suffolk, England
- Batting: Right-handed
- Bowling: Right-arm slow
- Role: All-rounder, occ. wicketkeeper
- Relatives: Brother Leslie

Domestic team information
- Years: Team
- 1914–31: Somerset
- First-class debut: 6 July 1914 Somerset v Sussex
- Last First-class: 21 August 1931 Somerset v Surrey

Career statistics
| Competition | First-class |
|---|---|
| Matches | 45 |
| Runs scored | 592 |
| Batting average | 10.20 |
| 100s/50s | –/– |
| Top score | 37 |
| Balls bowled | 654 |
| Wickets | 10 |
| Bowling average | 33.30 |
| 5 wickets in innings | – |
| 10 wickets in match | – |
| Best bowling | 3/51 |
| Catches/stumpings | 34/9 |
- Source: CricketArchive, 10 July 2010

Alan George Marshall (17 April 1895 – 14 May 1973) played first-class cricket for Somerset between 1914 and 1931. He was born at Chennai, India, then called Madras, and died at Pettistree, Woodbridge, Suffolk. The date of his death is recorded in his obituary in Wisden Cricketers' Almanack as 14 March 1973 and his first name in that reference is spelled "Allan".

Marshall was a lower-order right-handed batsman and a right-arm slow bowler for most of his first-class cricket career, but in the last three seasons in which he played, from 1929 to 1931, he also acted at times as Somerset's wicketkeeper because of the long-running ill-health of the county's regular keeper, Wally Luckes.

Educated at Taunton School, where he was an outstanding schoolboy cricketer, Marshall played in six Somerset matches in the 1914 season. After war service, he went back to Taunton School as a schoolmaster and stayed there until his retirement in 1955, playing much club cricket in the Taunton area. He reappeared in the Somerset side for a few games in the 1922, 1923 and 1926 seasons, without making much impact. His highest score was 37 in the match against Leicestershire at Leicester in 1922. In 1927, he played nine matches, and at times batted as high as No 4 in the batting order, but without success: he did, however, achieve his best bowling figures with three wickets for 51 runs in a rain-affected game against Glamorgan at Bath.

Marshall first played as wicketkeeper in the 1929 season and in 1930 he played 14 matches in total, although in some of them Frank Lee was the designated wicketkeeper. After Luckes' recovery, he did not play again in first-class cricket.

His brother Leslie also played for Somerset between 1913 and 1931.
