= Archives, museums and art galleries in the London Borough of Richmond upon Thames =

This is a list of archives, museums and art galleries in Richmond upon Thames.

Location of the London Borough of Richmond upon Thames in Greater London

== Archives ==
- The National Archives

== Museums ==
- Eel Pie Island Museum
- Garrick's Temple to Shakespeare
- The Hearsum Collection
- Langdon Down Museum of Learning Disability
- Museum No.1, Kew Gardens
- Museum of Army Music
- Museum of Richmond
- Twickenham Museum
- World Rugby Museum

== Art galleries at Kew Gardens ==
- Marianne North Gallery
- Shirley Sherwood Gallery

== Other art galleries ==
- Orleans House Gallery
- Riverside Gallery

== Art collections at Hampton Court Palace ==
- The Calling of Saints Peter and Andrew
- Hampton Court Beauties
- The Story of Abraham
- Triumphs of Caesar
- Windsor Beauties
- Other works of art at Hampton Court Palace
