= Hurll =

Hurll is a surname. Notable people with the surname include:

- Estelle May Hurll (1863–1924), American aesthetic analyst
- Fred Hurll (1905–1991), British scouting executive
- Michael Hurll (1936–2012), British television producer
