= Ecce Homo (Correggio) =

c. 1526 painting by Correggio

Christ Presented to the People (Ecce Homo)
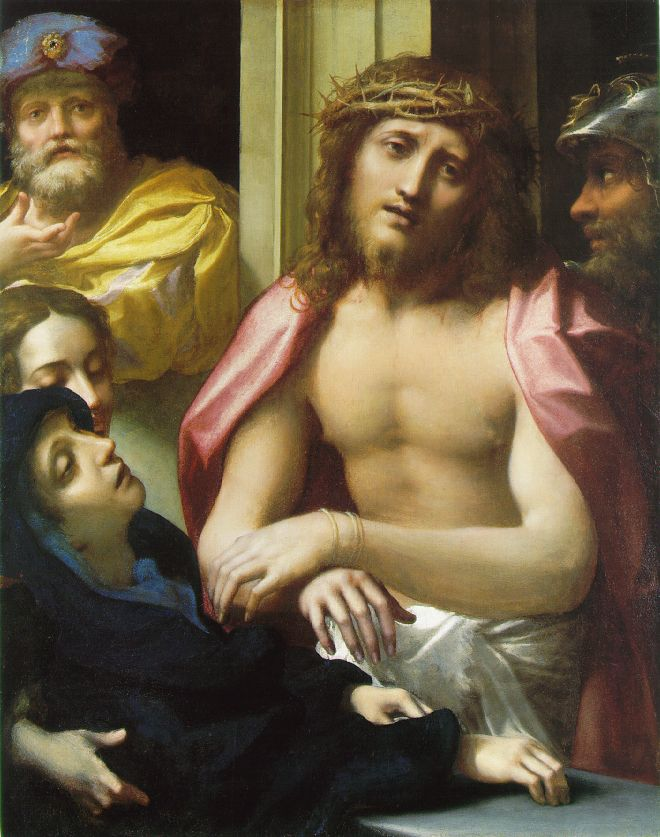
- Artist: Antonio da Correggio
- Year: c. 1526
- Medium: Oil on poplar
- Subject: Jesus, Pontius Pilate, Mary, possibly Mary Magdalene
- Dimensions: 99 cm × 80 cm (39 in × 31 in)
- Location: National Gallery, London
- Accession: NG15

Ecce Homo, also known as Christ Presented to the People, is an oil painting by Antonio da Correggio. It is the last of the surviving pictures of the Passion of Jesus that Correggio executed during the 1520s. The painting is in the National Gallery, London.

== Subject ==
According to the Gospels of Luke and John, the enemies of Jesus had to deal with their prisoner according to the formality of the Roman law. They brought him to the Roman governor, Pontius Pilate, accusing him of "perverting the nation, and forbidding to give tribute to Caesar, saying that he himself is Christ, a king." The governor duly examined Jesus, but, finding no case against him, proposed to scourge him and let him go.

Then Pilate therefore took Jesus and scourged him. And the soldiers platted a crown of thorns and put it on his head, and they put on him a purple robe, and said. Hail, King of the Jews! and they smote him with their hands. Pilate therefore went forth again, and saith unto them. Behold, I bring him forth to you, that ye may know that I find no fault in him.

Then came Jesus forth, wearing the crown of thorns, and the purple robe. And Pilate saith unto them, Behold the man! When the chief priests therefore and officers saw him, they cried out, saying Crucify him, Crucify him.

Pilate again sought to release Jesus, but the people continued to clamour, "Away with him," "Crucify him." "Then delivered he him therefore unto them to be crucified."

== Description ==
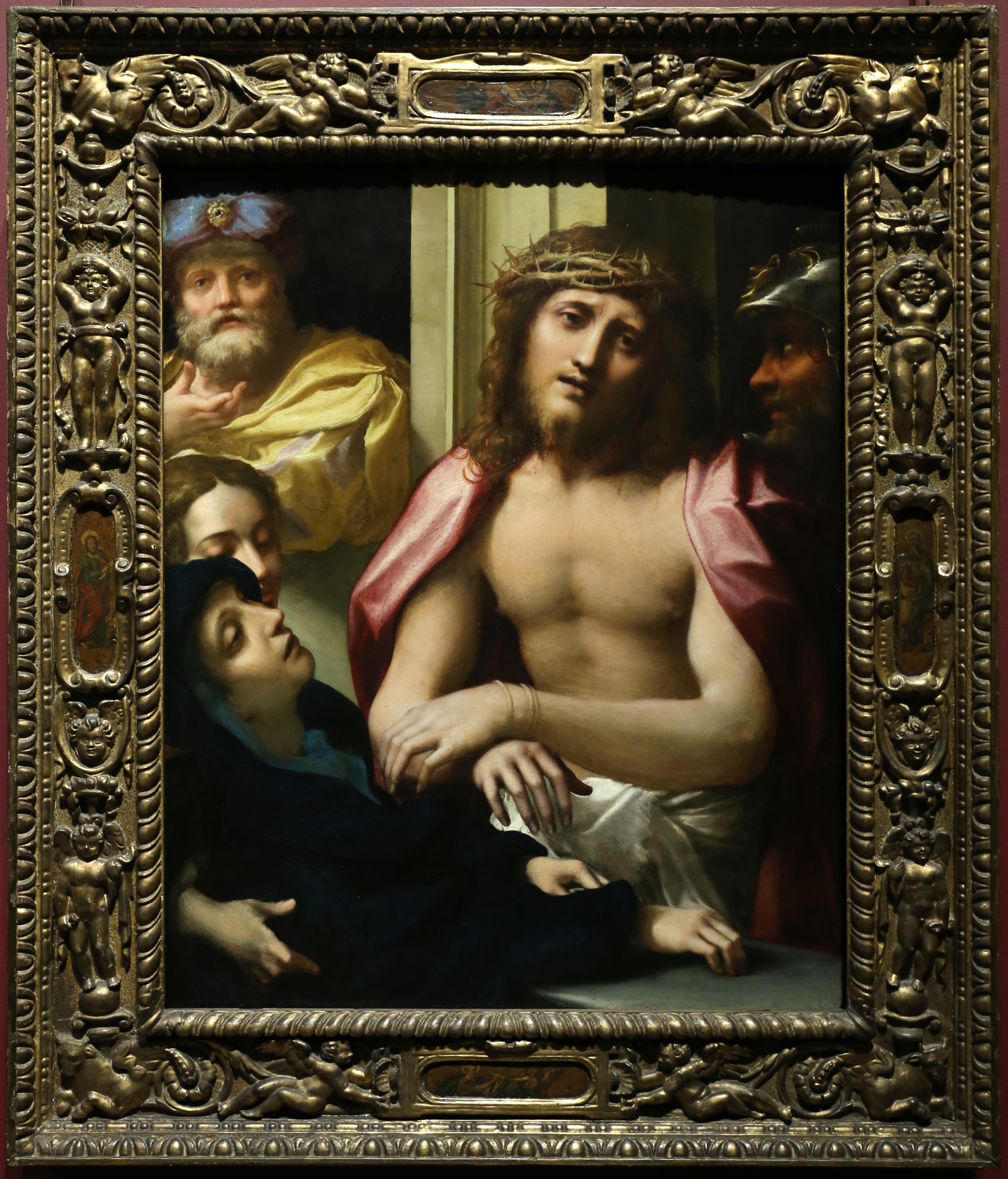
The painting in its current frame, hanging in the National Gallery.

The Latin form of Pilate's words, "Behold the man", has given the title Ecce Homo to this picture. It is the moment when Jesus comes forth from the rude mockery of the soldiers, clad in a royal robe, and wearing the crown of thorns. The governor has bidden one of the soldiers lead the prisoner out on a balcony of the palace. An eager throng of people are waiting outside, but they are not all enemies. Among them are a few faithful women, and they are allowed to press close to the balcony. At the sight of her son, treated as a criminal with bound hands, the mother, Mary, falls swooning over the balustrade, supported by a younger woman.

Pilate standing in the doorway behind appeals to the crowd: "I find no fault in him. Behold the man." He has been deeply impressed by his interview with Jesus, and is willing to do something in his behalf. According to Estelle May Hurll, "His face is good-natured, we see, but with no strength of character in it. He is a handsome man with curling beard carefully trimmed, apparently not a hard man to deal with, but easy-going and selfish."

Jesus stands with drooping head and an expression of suffering resignation. In the menacing faces before him he sees the hatred which will be satisfied with nothing less than his death. The rich mantle, which the soldiers have mockingly thrown over his shoulders, falls away and shows the body as it had been bared for the scourging. Hurll writes, "It is a beautiful form, perfectly developed, and the arms and hands are as delicately modelled as a woman's." The face is oval, with regular features of classic mould, a short parted beard, and long hair falling in disordered curls about it. This is the typical face of Christ in Western Christian art.

The mother Mary is still young and beautiful. A heavy veil or mantle is draped over her head, framing the pure profile of her face. This form of drapery is common among the old masters in painting Mary as Mater Dolorosa, or the Sorrowing Mother. Hurll writes, "Artistically considered, this figure of the fainting mother is the finest thing in the picture. Her companion, probably Mary Magdalene, is also a lovely creature, though we see only a part of her face."

Like the picture of the Mystic Marriage of St. Catherine, this painting shows how skilfully Correggio painted hands. Hurll observes, "The drooping fingers of the Saviour taper delicately, with long almond-shaped nails. Pilate's hand has slender, flexible fingers like those of some dainty woman, and might be mated with that of Mary Magdalene. It is apparent that the study of hands and feet interested [Correggio] more than that of faces. … [T]he face of Christ must be less attractive, on account of the sorrowful expression. To make up, as it were, for this, the hands are brought into prominent notice, and are very beautiful."

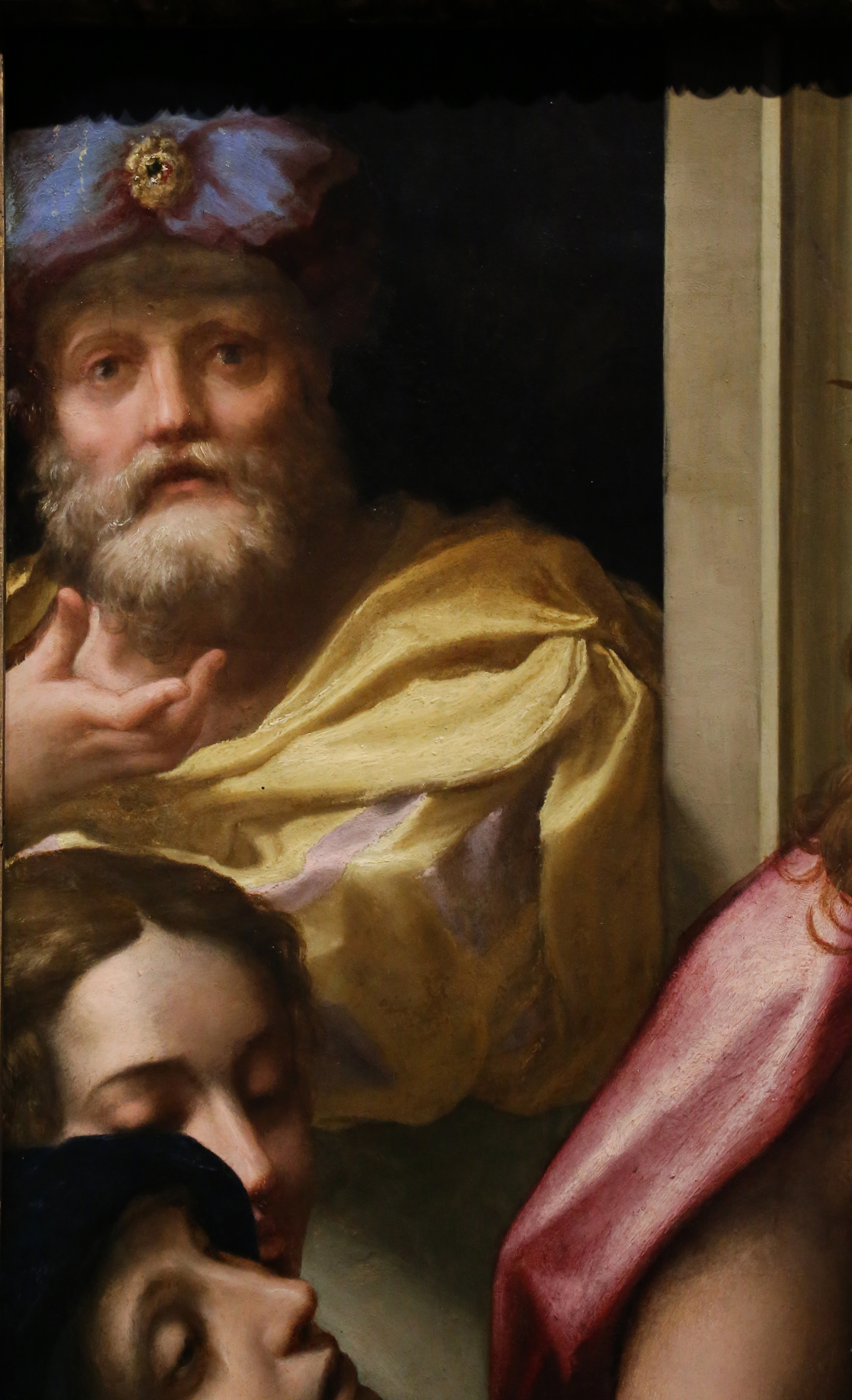

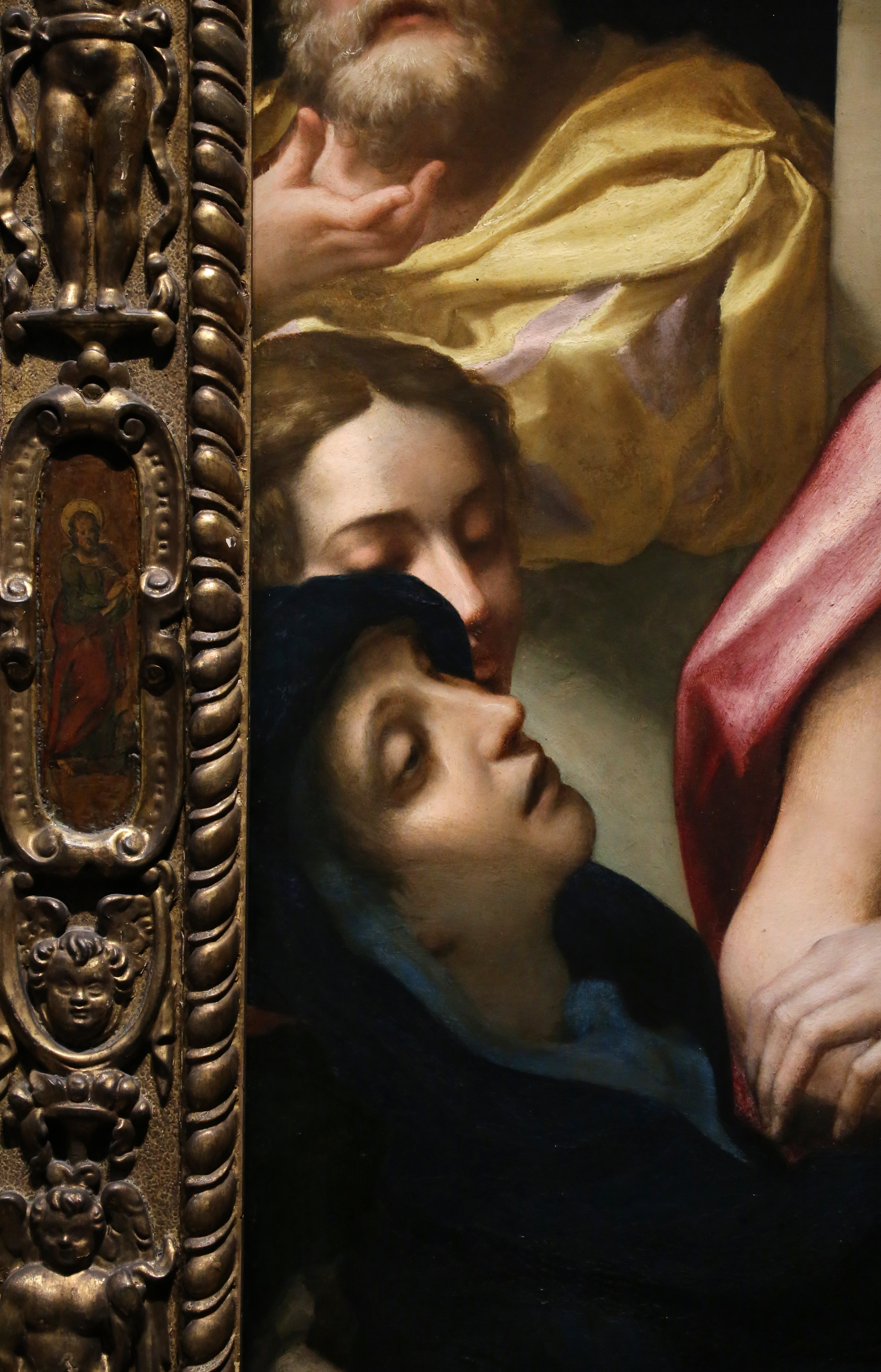

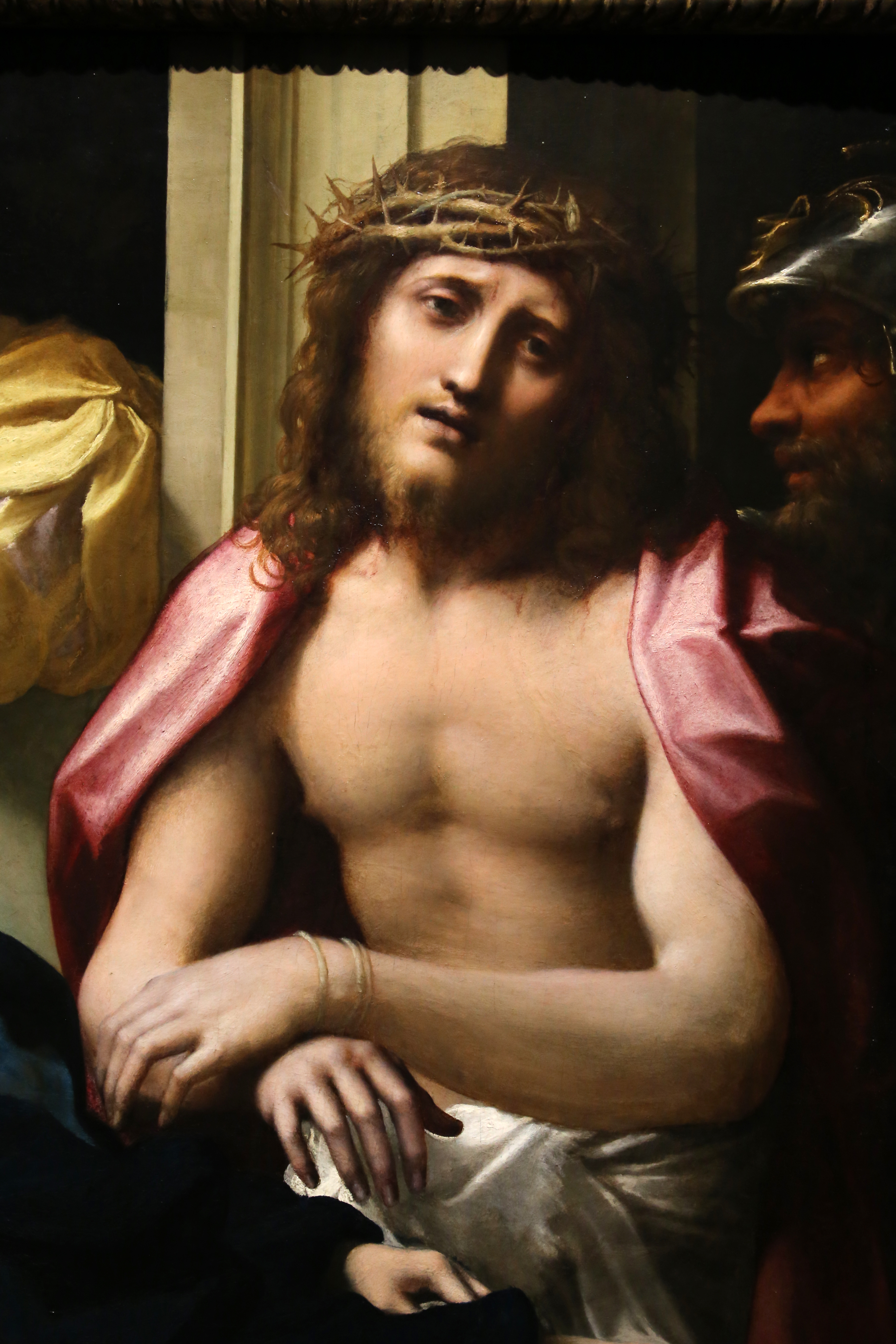

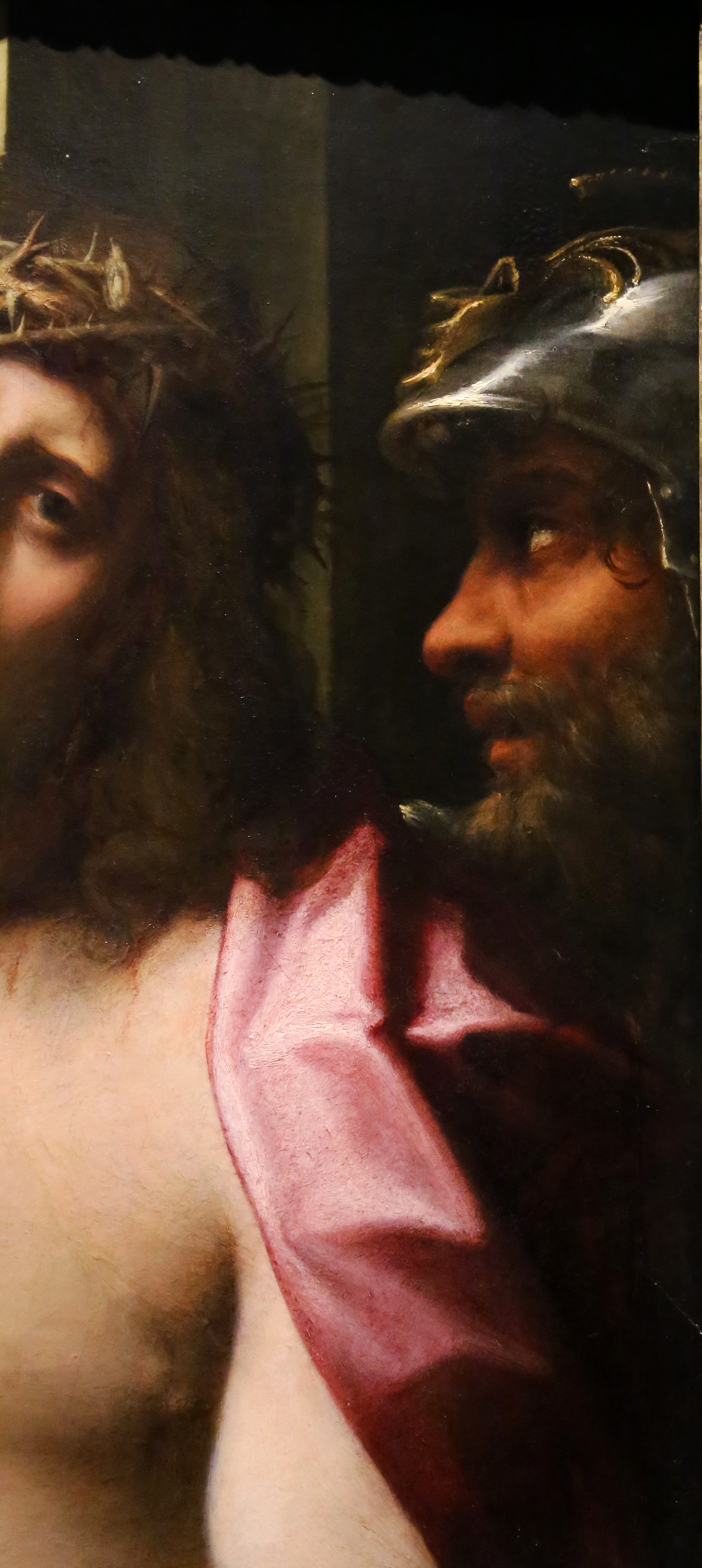

== Provenance ==
It is generally believed that the original Ecce Homo, of which there are several old copies, (Note: There is one in the Communal Palace at Rimini, another in the Galleria Estense at Modena, and a third in the Galleria nazionale di Parma.) is the picture now in the National Gallery of London. The picture belonged successively to the Count Prati of Parma, the Colonna family at Rome, Sir Simon Clarke, Joachim Murat, and the Marquess of Londonderry. It was bought by the National Gallery in 1834, and has the inventory number NG15.

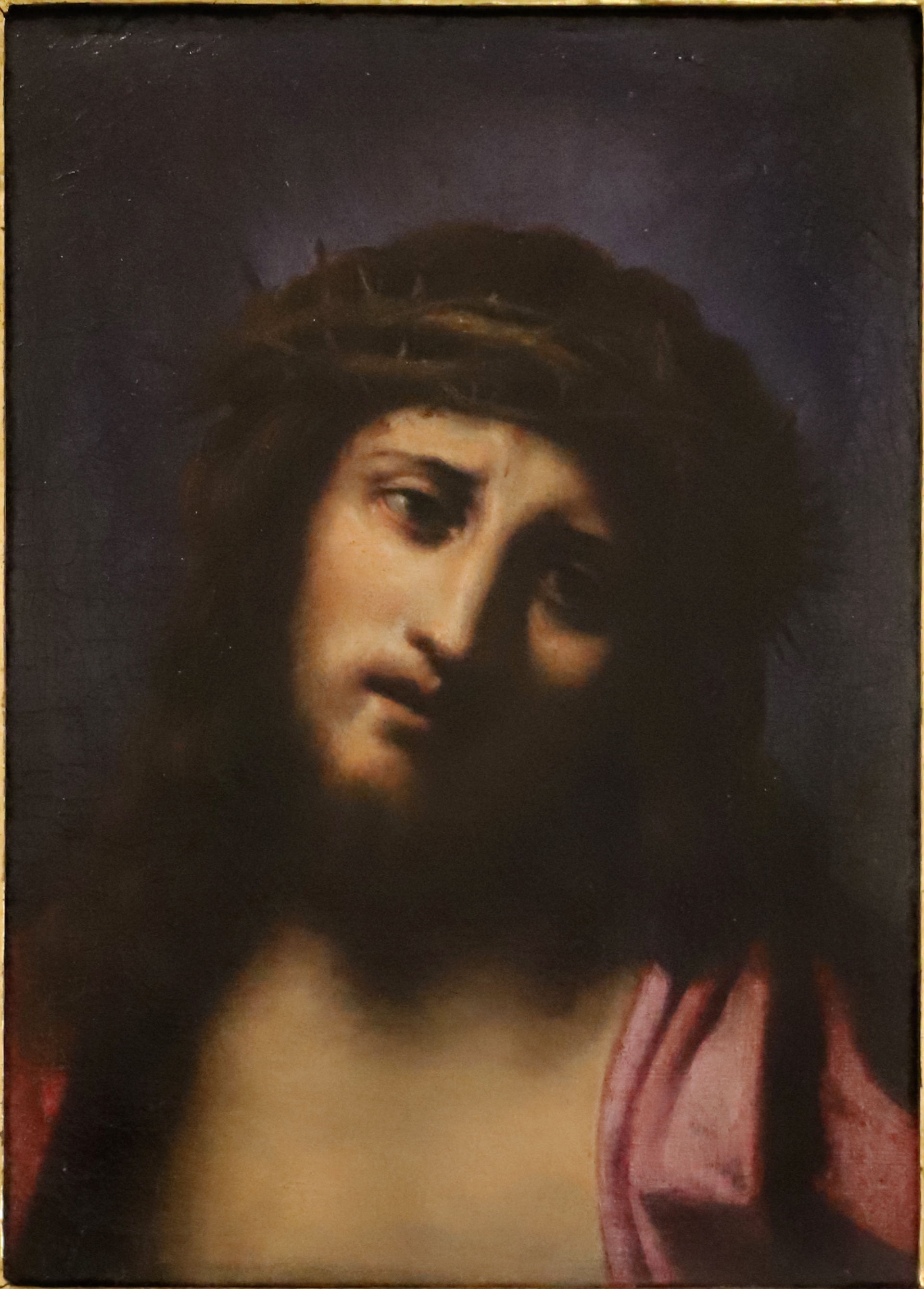
Ecce Homo, by the circle of Cigoli, in the Etruscan Academy Museum of the City of Cortona (?)

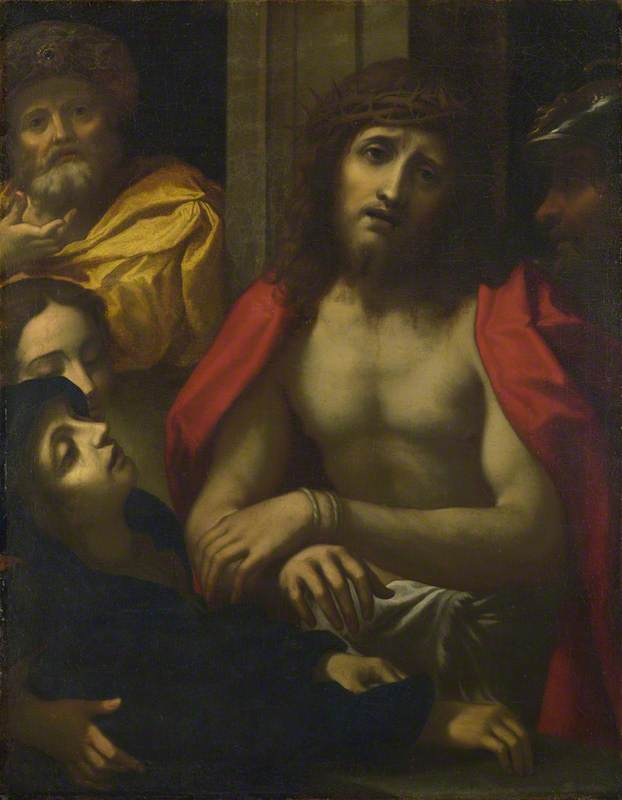
An old copy, also in the National Gallery, NG 96 (16th century)

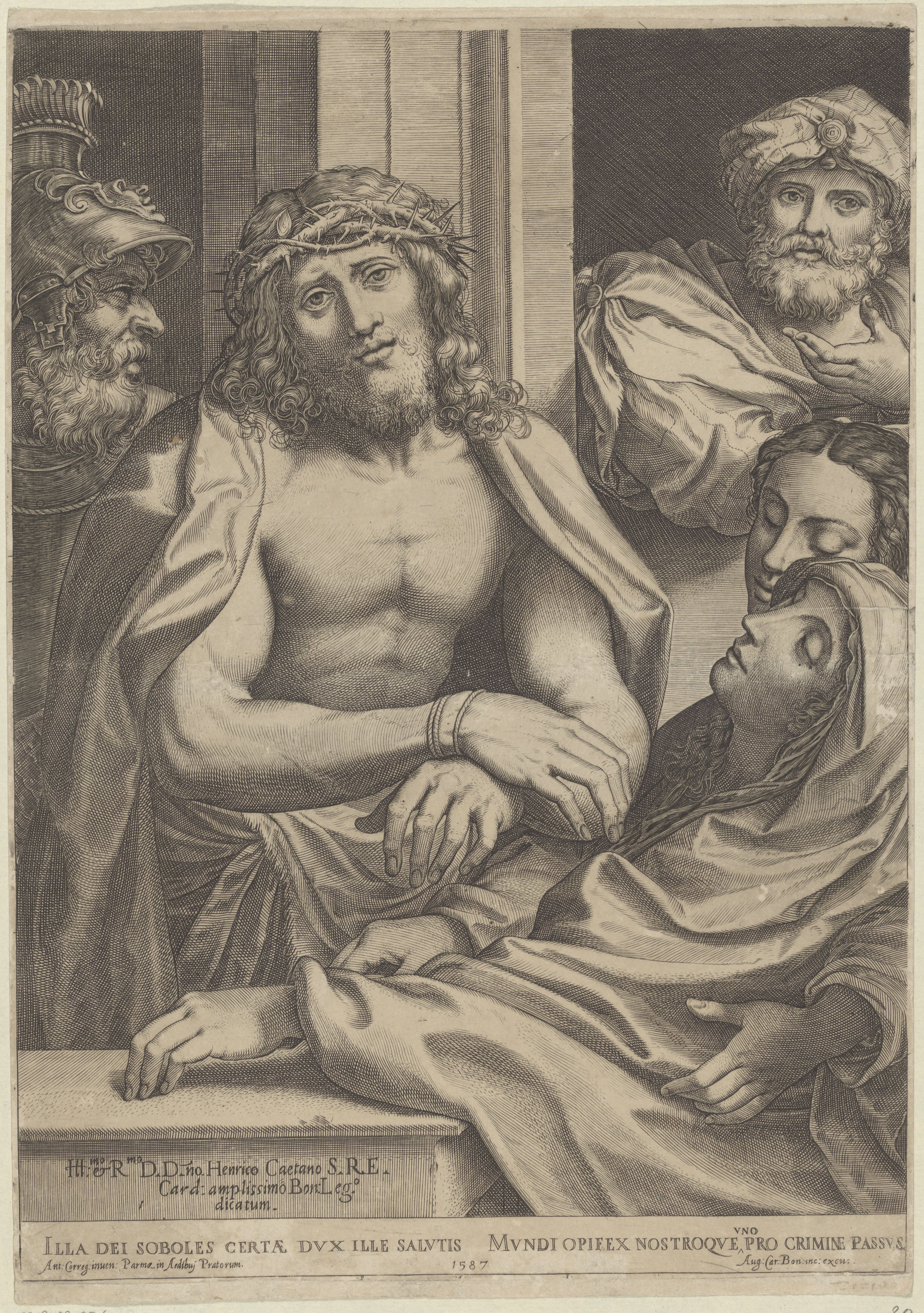
Print after Correggio's original by Agostino Carracci (1587)

== See also ==
- Head of Christ (Correggio)

== Sources ==
- Brinton, Selwyn (1900). Correggio. Williamson, G. C. (ed.). The Great Masterpieces in Painting and Sculpture. London: George Bell & Sons. pp. 40, 99, 124.
- Moore, Thomas Sturge (1906). Correggio. London: Duckworth and Co.; New York: Charles Scribner's Sons. pp. 150, 153, 258.
- Simmonds, Florence (1896). Antonio Allegri da Correggio: His Life, His Friends, and His Time. Translated by Ricci, Corrado. New York: Charles Scribner's Sons. pp. 214, 225–31, 305, 396.
- "Correggio | Christ presented to the People (Ecce Homo) | NG15". The National Gallery. Accessed 9 July 2022.

Attribution:
