= Trevor Baylis =

English inventor (1937–2018)

Trevor Baylis CBE
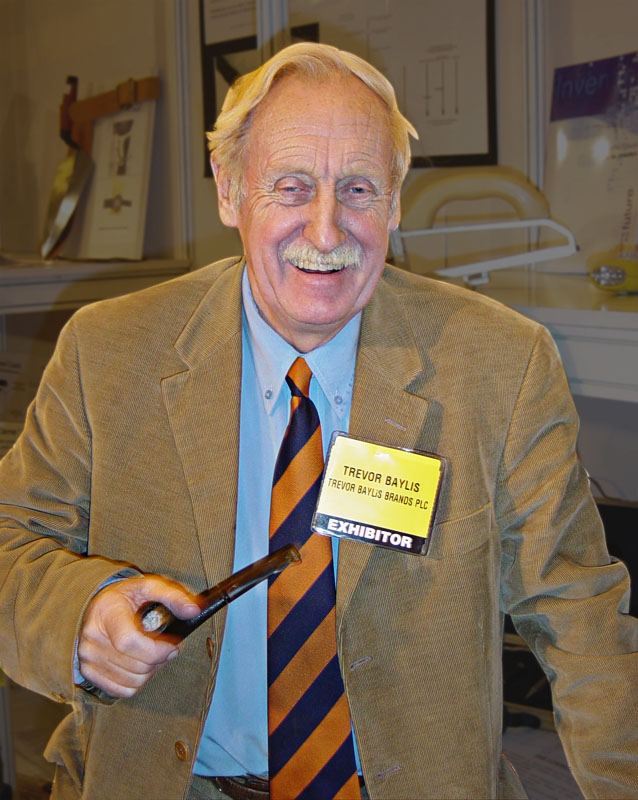
- Baylis in 2006
- Born: Trevor Graham Baylis; 13 May 1937; Kilburn, London, England
- Died: 5 March 2018 (aged 80); Eel Pie Island, Greater London, England
- Known for: Wind-up radio
- Awards: OBE (1997); CBE (2014)
- Website: www.trevorbaylisbrands.com

Trevor Graham Baylis CBE (13 May 1937 – 5 March 2018) was an English inventor best known for the wind-up radio. The radio, instead of relying on batteries or an external electrical source, is powered by the user winding a crank. This stores energy in a spring which then drives an electrical generator. Baylis invented it in response to the need to communicate information about AIDS to the "people of Africa". He ran a company in his name dedicated to helping inventors to develop and protect their ideas and to find a route to market.

== Early life ==
Baylis was born on 13 May 1937 to Gladys Jane Brown, an artist, and her husband, Cecil Archibald Walter Baylis, an engineer, in Kilburn, London. He grew up in Southall, Middlesex, and attended North Primary School and Dormers Wells Secondary Modern School.

His first job was in a soil mechanics laboratory in Southall where a day-release arrangement enabled him to study mechanical and structural engineering at a local technical college.

A keen swimmer, he swam for Great Britain at the age of 15; he narrowly failed to qualify for the 1956 Summer Olympics. In 1959, Baylis started his National Service as a physical-training instructor with the Royal Sussex Regiment and swam for the Army and Imperial Services during this time. When he left the army he took a job with Purley Pools, the company which made the first free-standing swimming pools. Initially he worked in a sales role, but later switched to research and development.

His swimming skills enabled him to demonstrate the pools and drew the crowds at shows, and this led to forming his own aquatic-display company as professional swimmer, stunt performer and entertainer, performing high dives into a glass-sided tank. With money earned from performing as an underwater-escape artist in the Berlin Circus, he set up Shotline Steel Swimming Pools, a company which supplies swimming pools to schools.

== Inventing career ==
Baylis's work as a stunt man exposed him to the needs of disabled people, through colleagues whose injuries had ended their performing careers. By 1985, this involvement had led him to invent and develop a range of products for the disabled called Orange Aids.

In the late 1980s or early 1990s, Baylis saw a television programme about the spread of AIDS in Africa and realised that a way to halt the spread of the disease would be to educate and disseminate information by radio. Within 30 minutes, he had assembled the first prototype of his most well-known invention, the wind-up radio. The original prototype included a small transistor radio, an electric motor from a toy car, and the clockwork mechanism from a music box. Baylis filed his first patent in 1992.

While the prototype worked well, Baylis struggled to find a production partner. The turning point came in 1994 when his prototype was featured on a film produced by Liz Tucker for the BBC TV programme Tomorrow's World, which resulted in an investor coming forward to back the product. With money from investors he formed a company called Freeplay Energy; in 1996, the Freeplay radio was given the BBC Design Awards for Best Product and Best Design. In the same year Baylis met Queen Elizabeth II and Nelson Mandela at a state banquet, and also travelled to Africa with the Dutch Television Service to produce a documentary about his life. He was awarded the 1996 World Vision Award for Development Initiative that year.

The year 1997 saw the production in South Africa of the new generation Freeplay radio, a smaller and cheaper model designed for the Western consumer market which uses rechargeable cells with a generic crank generator.

During the 1990s, Baylis was also a regular on the Channel 4 breakfast programme, The Big Breakfast.

In 2001, Baylis completed a 100-mile walk across the Namib Desert, demonstrating his electric shoes and raising money for the Mines Advisory Group. The "electric shoes", developed in collaboration with the UK's Defence Evaluation and Research Agency, use piezoelectric contacts in the heels to charge a small battery that can be used to operate a radio transceiver or cellular telephone.

Baylis set up the Trevor Baylis Foundation to "promote the activity of Invention by encouraging and supporting Inventors and Engineers". This led in September 2002 to the formation of the company 'Trevor Baylis Brands PLC' which provided inventors with professional partnership and services to enable them to establish the originality of their ideas, to patent or otherwise protect them, and to get their products to market. The company's primary goal was to secure licence agreements for inventors, but it also considered starting up new companies around good ideas. The company was based in Richmond, Greater London. In 2013 it was reported that the company was financially struggling and was primarily reliant upon Baylis' personal finances to keep itself running. A few months after his death, Trevor Baylis Brands PLC became insolvent, and in early 2019 it ceased trading.

== Personal life ==
For many years, Baylis lived on Eel Pie Island on the river Thames. He regularly attended jazz performances at the Eel Pie Island Hotel. He was a pipe-smoker and in 1999, received the Pipe Smoker of the Year award from the British Pipesmokers' Council. In March 2010, Baylis stated that he was sexually abused at the age of five by a Church of England curate. This was also covered in his 1999 autobiography, Clock This.

In 2013 it was reported that Baylis was in financial difficulties and was living in relative poverty, having made little money from his wind-up power invention's commercialization, having lost legal control of the product after it had been re-engineered by his corporate partners, and he was relying on a small income as a motivational after-dinner speaker.

He died on 5 March 2018 at the age of 80 after a heart attack and having been afflicted with Crohn's disease in his final years. At the time of his death he was unmarried and had no living next-of-kin. A funeral was held at Mortlake Crematorium on 13 March 2018, where his body was cremated in a novelty coffin fashioned as the wind-up radio that he had invented.

== Awards and honours ==
Baylis was appointed an Officer of the Order of the British Empire (OBE) for humanitarian services in the 1997 Birthday Honours, and a Commander of the Order of the British Empire (CBE) in the 2015 New Year Honours for services to intellectual property. Baylis was awarded 11 honorary degrees from UK universities. He received honorary doctorates from the Open University in 2001,Heriot-Watt University in 2003,Leeds Metropolitan University in 2005, and the University of Northampton in 2009.

== See also ==
- Eel Pie Island Museum
- List of English inventors and designers
