= Head of Christ (Correggio) =

1521 painting by Correggio

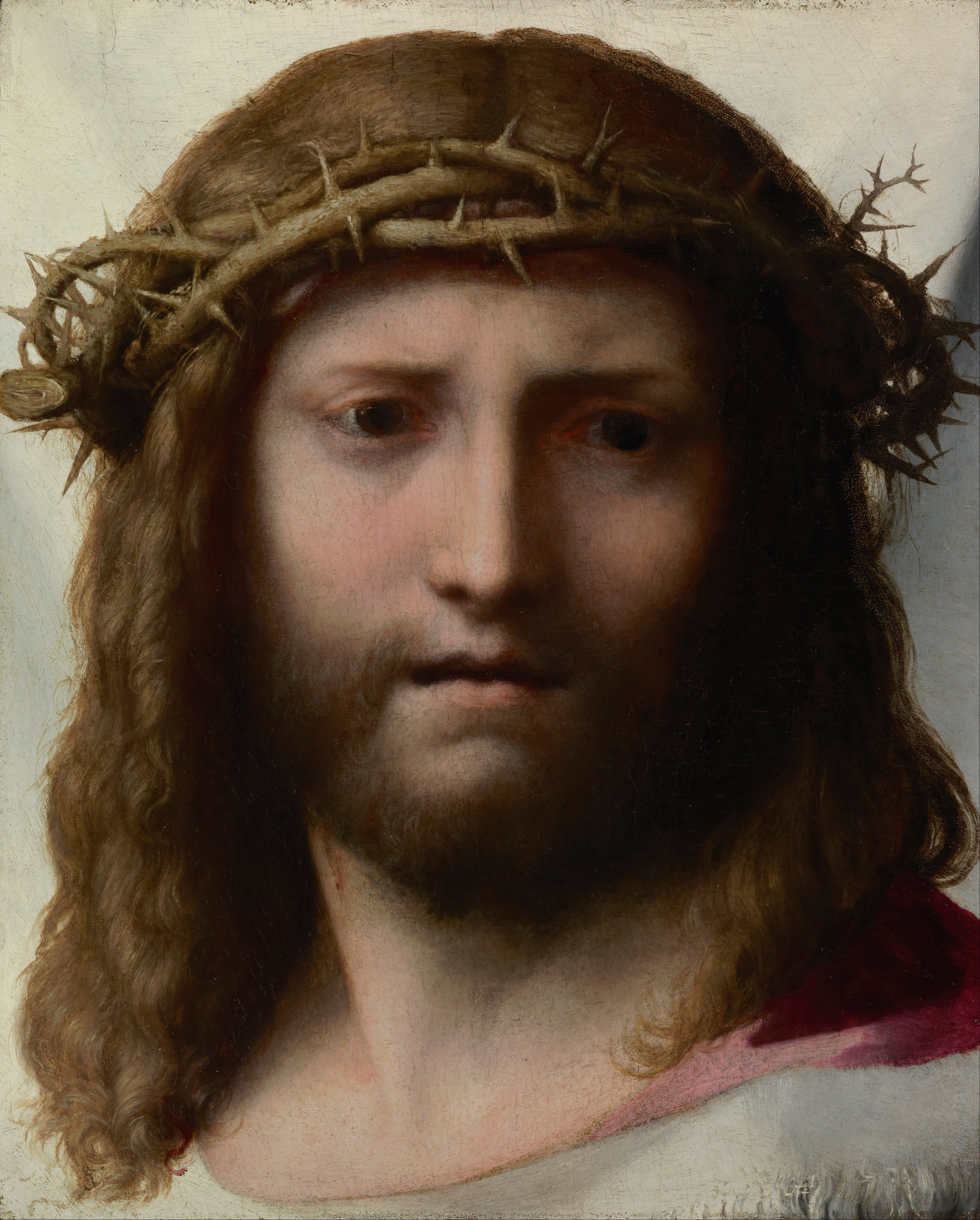
- Artist: Correggio
- Year: 1521
- Medium: Oil on panel
- Dimensions: 23 cm × 28 cm (9.1 in × 11 in)
- Location: Getty Museum, Los Angeles

Head of Christ is a painting in oil on panel by the Italian Renaissance painter Antonio da Correggio, dated 1521. It depicts the head of Christ, wearing the crown of thorns. In the background there is a white cloth showing that the image represents the Veil of Veronica, but Christ's head is given volume through alternate use of light and dark shadows. The painting is in the J. Paul Getty Museum in Los Angeles. Correggio was known for creating some of the most sumptuous religious paintings of the period. The Getty Museum considers this artwork as one of the masterpieces of painting held by the museum.

== Painting ==
The painting is a small artwork, probably intended for private devotion, which depicts the head of Christ crowned with thorns, in half profile turning his head towards the viewer. Through the use of the alternate use of light and shade; the chiaroscuro technique is used by the artist to highlight the line of the nose, cheekbones and the neck. All this, however, is softened by the muted tones of the nuances he used when depicting the color of the body. The strong shadows and the sculptural treatment of the head make this one of the most distinguishable representations on the Veil of Veronica. According to legend, Christ stumbled on his way to Golgotha carrying the cross. Veronica took off her own veil, and wiped his face with it. Christ's features were miraculously imprinted on the veil.

In the early 1520s, Correggio was particularly interested in the study of the characters of the sacred history. Christ has his lips slightly parted, as if he would like to speak to the viewer. Correggio's bold reassessment of the theme filled the face of Christ an intense pathos. He looks at the viewers, as if to implore their mercy. According to art historian John Shearman this kind of depiction is a typical example of a "transitive work", i.e. a work that requires the emotional participation of the viewer and that can only be completed through being in the physical presence of the image.

== See also ==
- Ecce Homo (Correggio)

== Sources ==
- Shearman, Mannerism, ISBN 0140137599, Penguin Books, 1991
