= Pipe Smoker of the Year =

British award

Pipe Smoker of the Year was an award given out annually by the British Pipesmokers' Council to honour a famous pipe-smoking individual. Initiated in 1965 as Pipeman of the Year by the Briar Pipe Trade Association, it was presented at a lunch in The Landmark London each January, eventually transferring to the River Room at the Savoy Hotel.

The award was discontinued in 2004 because its organisers feared it fell foul of laws banning all advertising and promotion of tobacco.

The award was briefly reintroduced in 2014, by the UK Federation of Pipe Clubs, at the British Pipe Smoking Championship at Newark Showground. In a departure from previous awards the recipient was not a celebrity, but the outgoing President of the UK Federation of Pipe Clubs, Brian Mills, in recognition for his personal contribution in recommencing the British Pipe Smoking Championships.

== Pipe Smokers of the Year ==
- 1964 – Rupert Davies
- 1965 – Harold Wilson
- 1966 – Andrew Cruickshank
- 1967 – Warren Mitchell (Note: Warren Mitchell did not accept his award, calling it "silly". "I smoke a pipe; I also use a lavatory brush. By the same token you could make me 'lavatory brush man of the year.'" The Guardian 13 January 1968)
- 1968 – Peter Cushing
- 1969 – Jack Hargreaves
- 1970 – Eric Morecambe
- 1971/72 (Note: Until 1972 the award was made for the pipe smoker of the previous year; from 1973 onwards it was for the forthcoming year. Manny Shinwell, who held the award throughout 1972, was subsequently listed as the "1971/1972" winner.) – Lord Shinwell
- 1973 – Frank Muir
- 1974 – Fred Trueman
- 1975 – Campbell Adamson
- 1976 – Harold Wilson (Pipeman of the Decade)
- 1977 – Brian Barnes
- 1978 – Magnus Magnusson
- 1979 – J. B. Priestley
- 1980 – Edward Fox (Note: Edward Fox accepted his award but declined the prize of three pipes and a quantity of his favourite tobacco and asked for the cash value, about £100, to be sent to help Cambodian refugees. The Times 25 January 1980)
- 1981 – James Galway
- 1982 – Dave Lee Travis
- 1983 – Patrick Moore
- 1984 – Henry Cooper
- 1985 – Jimmy Greaves
- 1986 – David Bryant
- 1987 – Barry Norman
- 1988 – Ian Botham
- 1989 – Jeremy Brett
- 1990 – Laurence Marks
- 1991 – John Harvey-Jones
- 1992 – Tony Benn
- 1993 – Rod Hull
- 1994 – Ranulph Fiennes
- 1995 – Jethro
- 1996 – Colin Davis
- 1997 – Malcolm Bradbury
- 1998 – Willie John McBride
- 1999 – Trevor Baylis
- 2000 – Joss Ackland
- 2001 – Russ Abbot
- 2002 – Richard Dunhill
- 2003 – Stephen Fry
- 2014 – Brian Mills

== British Pipe Smoking Championships ==
The British Pipe Smoking Championship is a slow-smoking endurance contest where competitors try to keep a single pipe lit for as long as possible.
