= Saint Catherine Reading =

Painting by Correggio, c. 1530 – 1532

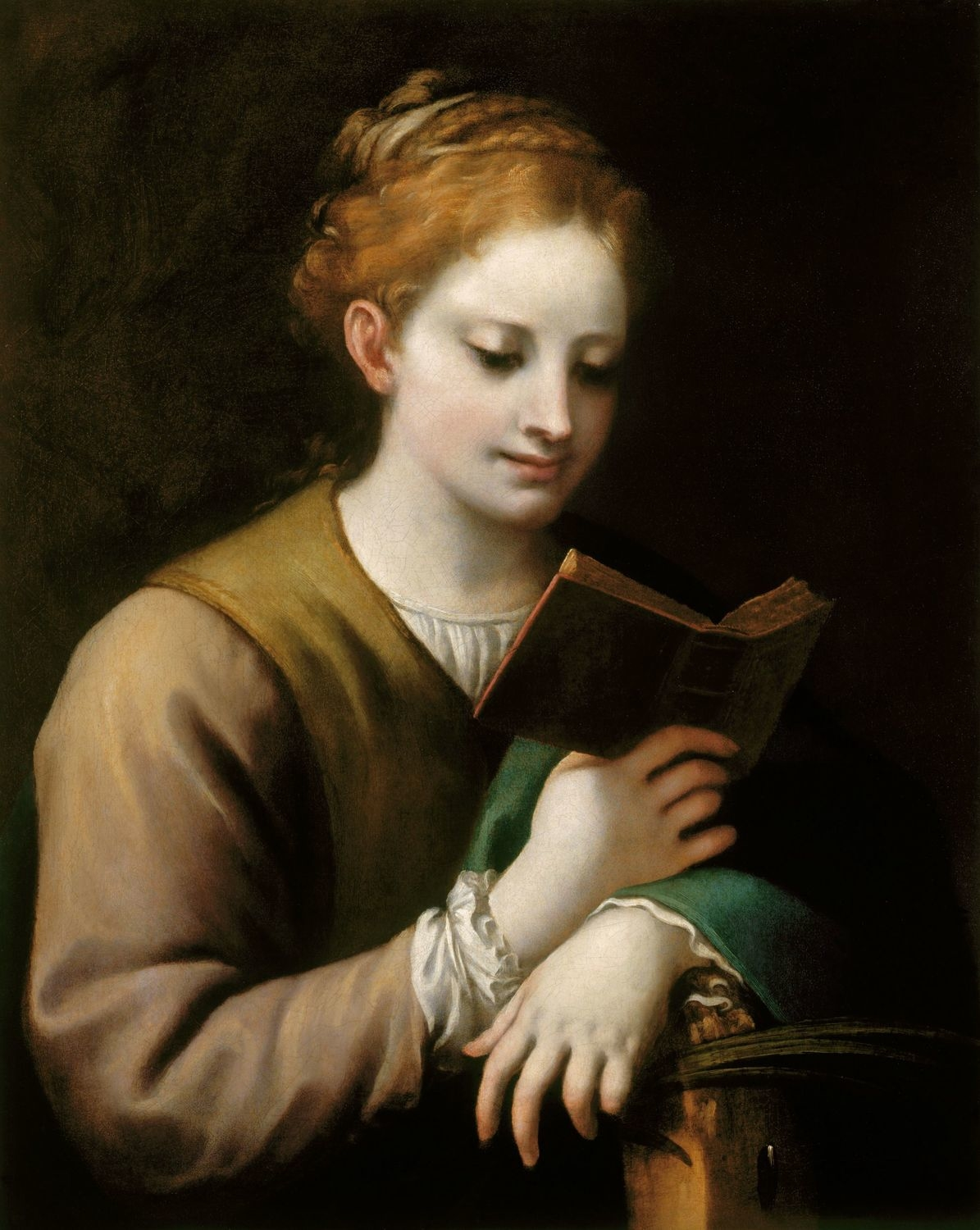
- Artist: Antonio da Correggio
- Year: c. 1530
- Medium: Oil on canvas
- Subject: Catherine of Alexandria
- Dimensions: 64.5 cm × 52.2 cm (25.4 in × 20.6 in)
- Location: Hampton Court Palace
- Accession: RCIN 405768

Saint Catherine Reading is an oil painting by the Italian Renaissance master Antonio da Correggio, painted c. 1530–1532. It is part of the Royal Collection, and is currently on display at Hampton Court Palace, London.

== Subject ==
The story of St. Catherine is related in the Golden Legend. She was the daughter of "a noble and prudent king" named Costus, "who reigned in Cyprus at the beginning of the third century," and "had to his wife a queen like to himself in virtuous governance." Though good people according to their light, they were pagans and worshippers of idols.

Even in her babyhood the child Catherine was "so fair of visage '' that all the people rejoiced at her beauty. At seven years of age she was sent to school, where "she drank plenteously of the well of wisdom." Her father was so delighted with her precocity that he had built a tower containing divers chambers where she might pursue her studies. Seven masters were engaged to teach her, the best and "wisest in conning" that could be found. So rapid was their pupil's progress that she soon outstripped them in knowledge, and from being her masters they became her disciples.

When the princess was fourteen, her father died, leaving her heir to his kingdom. A parliament was convened, and the young queen was crowned with great solemnity. Then arose a committee of lords and commons, petitioning her to allow them to seek some noble knight or prince to marry her and defend the kingdom. Now Catherine had secretly resolved not to marry, but she answered with a wisdom not learned altogether from books. She agreed to marry if they would bring her a bridegroom possessing certain qualifications which she knew were impossible to fulfil. This silenced the counsellors, and she continued to reign alone.

In the course of time Queen Catherine became a Christian and devoted herself to works of religion and charity. Under her teaching many of her people were converted to the faith. It was a happy kingdom until the Emperor Maxentius chanced to visit the royal city. He was a tyrant who persecuted Christians. Upon his arrival he ordered public sacrifices to idols, and all who would not join in the heathen ceremony were slain. Then Catherine went boldly to meet the emperor and set forth to him the errors of paganism. Though confounded by her eloquence he was not to be convinced by the words of a mere woman. Accordingly he summoned from divers provinces fifty masters "which surmounted all mortal men in worldly wisdom." They were to hold a discussion with the queen and put her to confusion. For all their arguments, however, Catherine had an answer. So complete was her victory that the entire company declared themselves Christians. The angry emperor caused them all to be burned and cast Catherine into prison.

Even here she continued her good works, converting the empress and a prince who came to visit her. A new torment was then devised for her. Iron wheels were made, bound with sharp razors, and she was placed between these while they were turned in opposite directions. "And anon as this blessed virgin was set in this torment, the angel of the Lord brake the wheels by so great force that it slew four thousand paynims." Maxentius then commanded that she should be beheaded, and St. Catherine went cheerfully to her death.

== Description ==
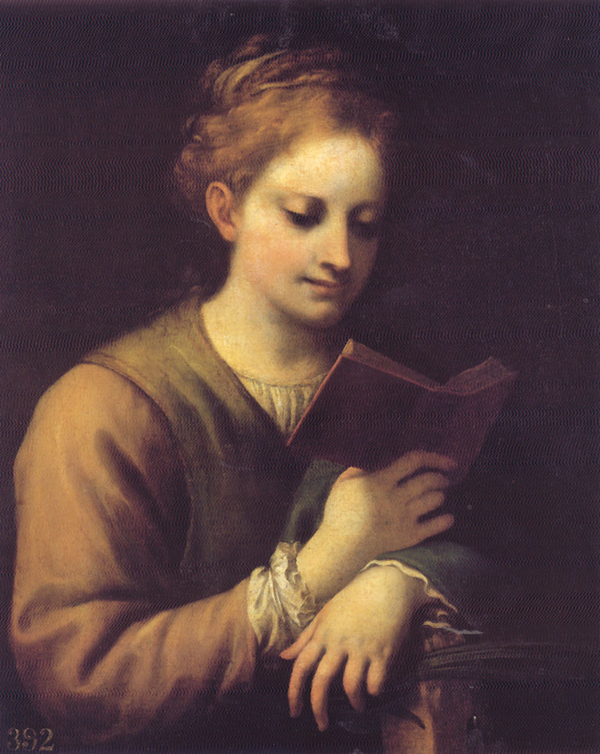
The painting before cleaning in 2007 to remove the discoloured varnish and overpaint.

Other virgin martyrs may have been as good and as beautiful as St. Catherine, but none were so wise. She is identified in this picture by the book she holds. Eager to acquire all the treasures of knowledge, she fixes her eyes on the page, absorbed in her occupation. Already she has read more than half the thick volume, smiling with quiet enjoyment as she reads. There is little in the face to suggest the scholar or the bookworm. Estelle May Hurll notes, "Were this a modem picture, we should fancy it a young lady reading her favourite poet. As it is, however, we must believe that the book is some work by Plato or another of the ancient writers whom St. Catherine could quote so readily. We need not wonder that she does not knit her brow over any difficult passages. What might be hard for another to grasp is perfectly clear to her understanding."

The beautiful hair coiled over her head is the only coronet the princess wears. There is no sign of her royalty, and Hurll infers "that the picture represents her in those early days of girlhood before the cares of government were laid on the young shoulders." The left arm rests on the rim of a wheel, making a support for the hand holding the book. The wheel is the emblem most frequently associated with St. Catherine, as the reminder of the tortures inflicted by Maxentius. The palm branch caught in the fingers of the left hand is the symbol used alike for all the martyrs. The reference is to that passage in the book of Revelation which describes the saints standing before the throne "with palms in their hands."

Hurll writes, "It is pleasant to believe that Correggio took unusual pains with this picture of St. Catherine. The story of the lovely young princess seems to have appealed to his imagination, and he has conceived an ideal figure for her character. The exquisite oval of the face, the delicate features, and the beautiful hair make this one of the most attractive faces in his works."

The light falls over the right shoulder, casting one side of the face in shadow. The modulations of light on the chin and neck, and the gradation in the shadow cast by the book on the hand, show Correggio's mastery of chiaroscuro.

== History ==
Several old copies after this painting elaborate the composition to show Saint Catherine kneeling either full-length or three-quarter length. Usually this sort of evidence indicates that an original painting has been cut down, but that is not the case here: cusping is apparent at all the edges, revealing the stretched edge of the original canvas. Copies of the painting are all roughly the same. Most scholars accept the painting as autograph (that is, painted entirely by Correggio) and date it as one of his last works, c. 1530–1532.

The same composition—Saint Catherine half-length, resting on a wheel and holding the palm of a martyr—is found in the work of several north Italian painters, including Cesare de Sesto, (Note: Galleria Borghese, Rome.) Garofalo, (Note: National Gallery, London.) Dosso Dossi, (Note: Galleria Borghese, Rome.) and Lorenzo Lotto. (Note: National Gallery of Art, Washington DC.) There is also a similar, earlier painting by Bernardino Luini in the National Gallery of Denmark, Copenhagen, which may have been inspired by the work or ideas of Luini's master, Leonardo da Vinci.

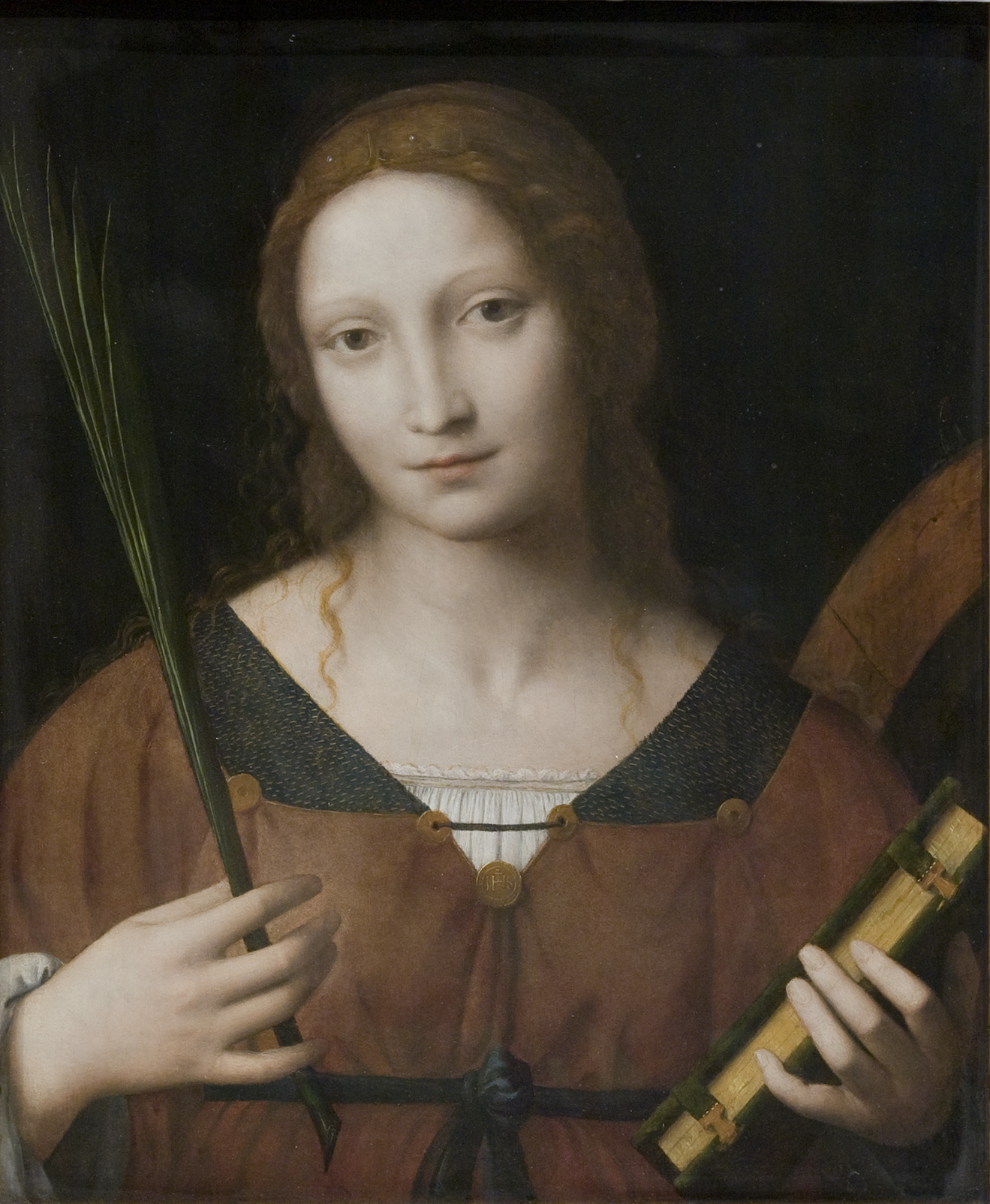
Bernardino Luini: St Catherine of Alexandria (1495–1532)

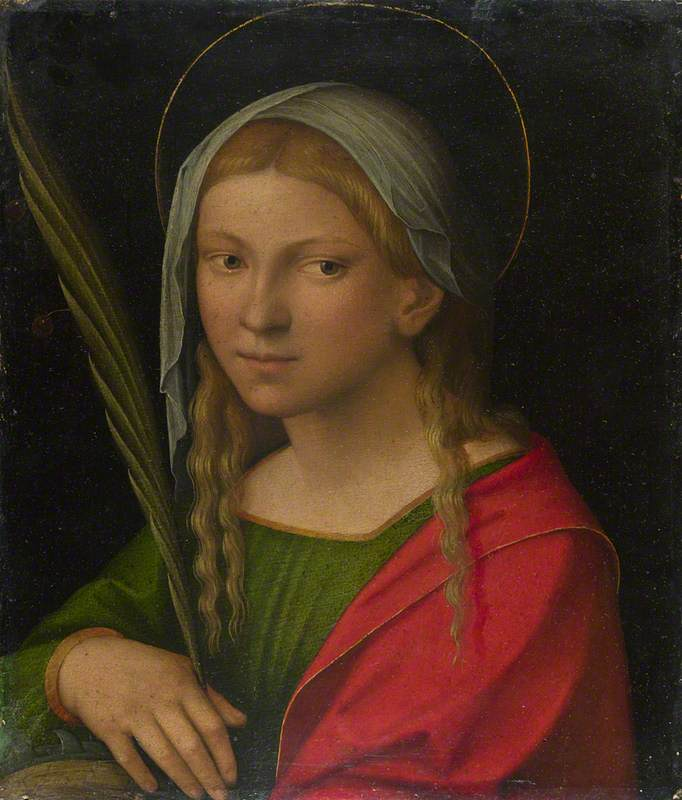
Garofalo: Saint Catherine of Alexandria (1513–32)

Lorenzo Lotto: Saint Catherine (1522)

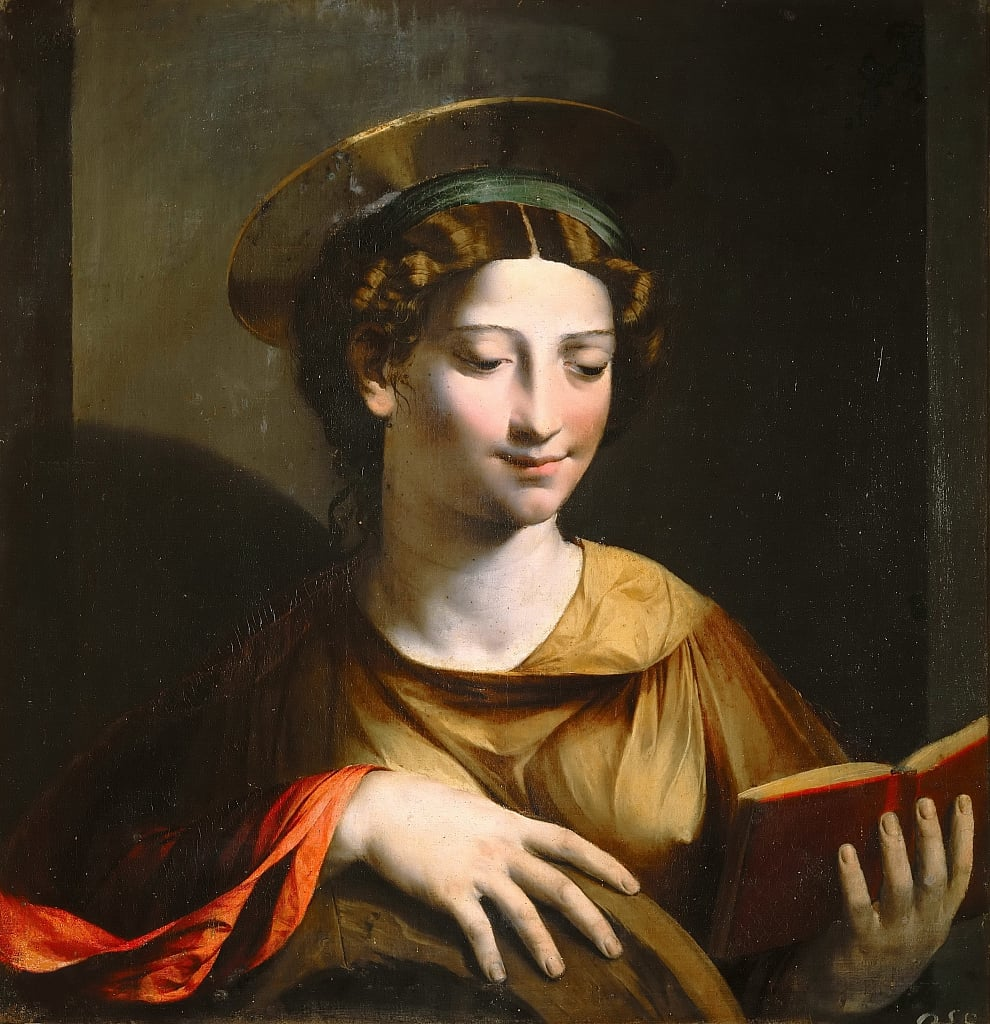
Dosso Dossi: Saint Catherine of Alexandria (c. 1530)

== Provenance ==
- Acquired by Charles I, Charles II or James II;
- First certainly recorded in Store at Whitehall in 1688 (no. 242);
- East Closet, Hampton Court Palace (no. 281).

== Sources ==
- Brinton, Selwyn (1900). Correggio. Williamson, G. C. (ed.). The Great Masterpieces in Painting and Sculpture. London: George Bell & Sons. pp. 103, 126.
- Moore, Thomas Sturge (1906). Correggio. London: Duckworth and Co.; New York: Charles Scribner's Sons. p. 258.
- Whitaker, Lucy; Clayton, Martin (2007). The Art of Italy in the Royal Collection: Renaissance & Baroque . St James's Palace, London: Royal Collection Enterprises Ltd. pp. 38, 128, 130–31.
- "Saint Catherine Reading c.1530-32". Royal Collection Trust. Accessed 10 July 2022.

Attribution:
