= Eel Pie Island =

Small island in the River Thames in London, England

Coordinates: 51.4452°N 0.3246°W

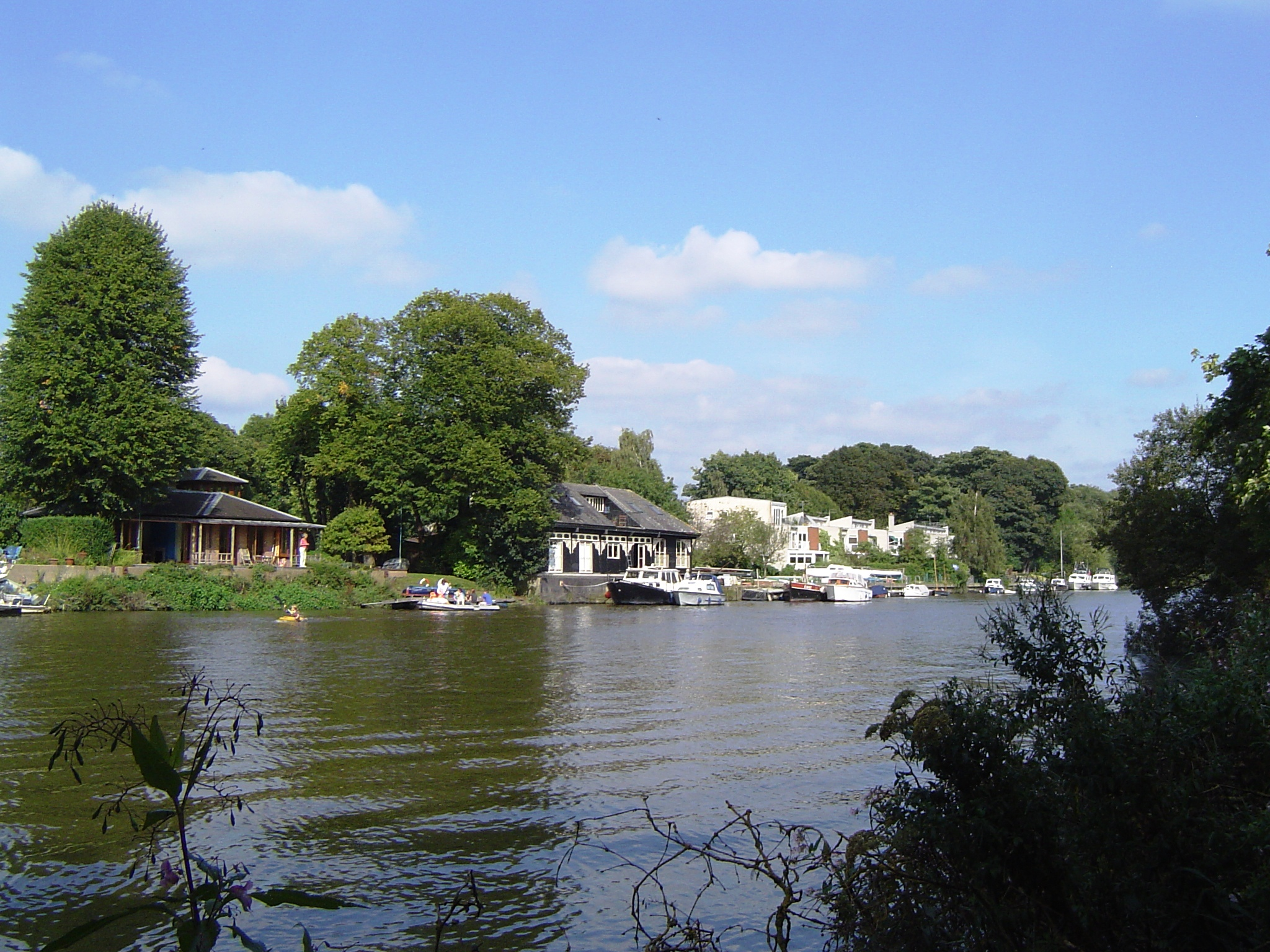

- Location within Greater London
- OS grid reference: TQ164731
- Region: London
- Country: England
- Sovereign state: United Kingdom
- Post town: TWICKENHAM
- Postcode district: TW1
- Dialling code: 020
- Police: Metropolitan
- Fire: London
- Ambulance: London
- UK Parliament: Twickenham

Eel Pie Island is an 8.9-acre (3.6 ha) island (or ait) in the River Thames at Twickenham in the London Borough of Richmond upon Thames. It is on the maintained minimum head of water above Richmond Lock, the only lock on the Tideway, and is accessible by boat or from the left (generally north) bank by a footbridge. The island had a club that was a major venue for jazz and blues in the 1960s.

== Name and former names ==
The name may have come from eel pies which were served by the inn on the island in the 19th century. Its earlier names chronologically were the Parish Ait and Twickenham Ait, the latter co-existing until at least the 1880s. Before the 19th century it was for many centuries three parts – the core of each safely above high water, if not narrowly separated, as shown by a map of 1607.

== History ==
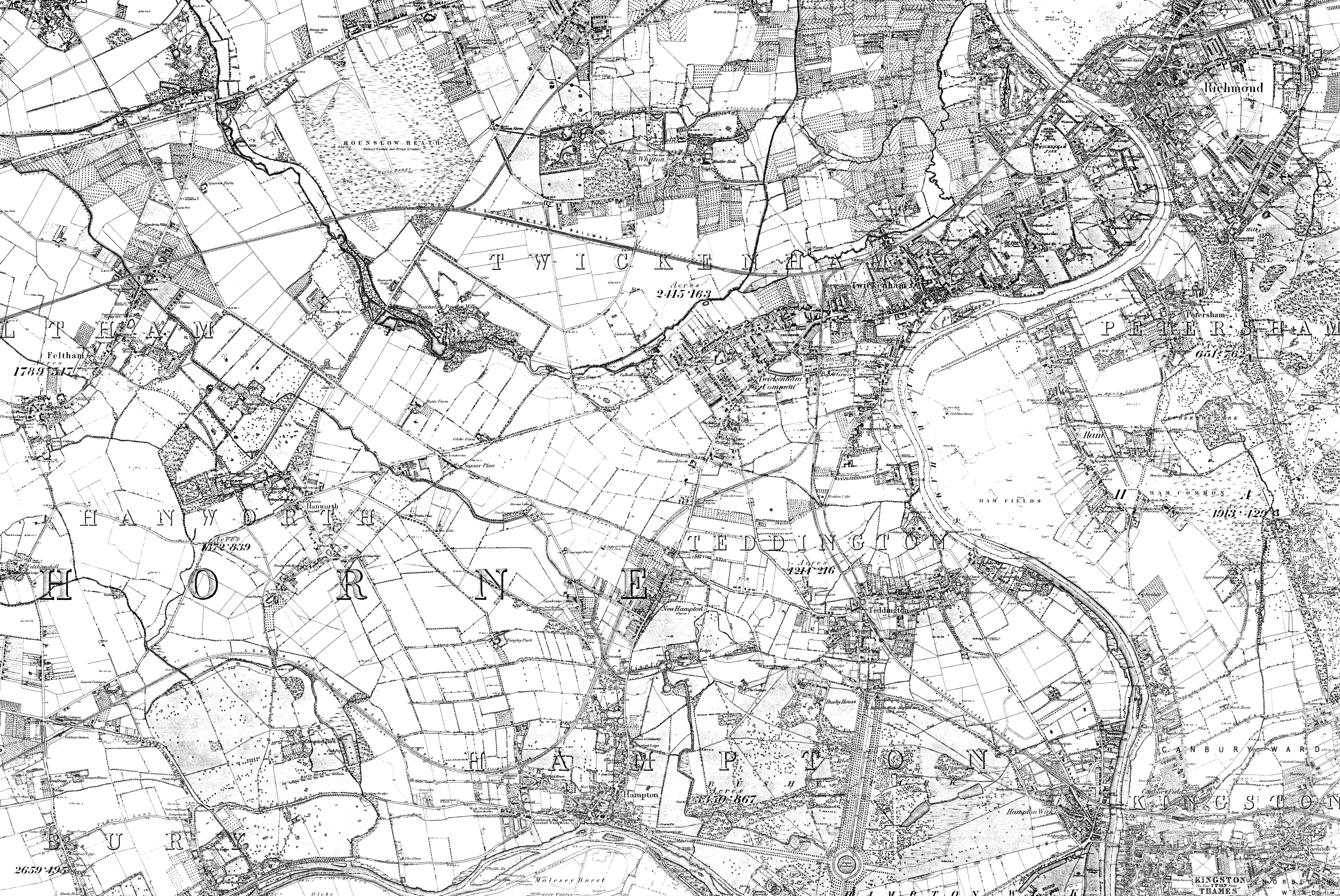
In 1871 to 1882 map series (OS, 1st series at 1:10560: Surrey. Click to expand/see wider.

=== Early history ===
Some Mesolithic implements hand-made from red deer antlers have been retrieved from the island's shore.

=== Eel Pie House ===
There was an inn on the island by 1743, and in the 19th century it was a popular stopping point for steamer excursions. When a new inn was built in 1830 to replace it, the former venue was alternatively called a "dingy wooden cottage" or an "unassuming but popular little barn".

Samuel Lewis's national gazetteer of 1848 devotes a large minority of the text covering Twickenham to the island; saying it is:

called Twickenham Ait. This island comprises about eight acres, chiefly pleasure-grounds, and in the centre is the Eel-Pie House, noted for the last two centuries as a favourite resort for refreshment and recreation to water parties, and persons repairing hither [coming here] for the amusement of fishing; the old building was taken down in 1830, and a commodious edifice, comprising a good assembly-room measuring 50 feet by 15, erected on the site.

=== Extent and access ===
The island is recorded in at least two distinct parts in detailed maps until the end of the 19th century; the west part was built up in height and measured 7.160 acres (2.9 ha). Its named features were a large Boat House, the Island Hotel, a bowling green in the west and the Thames Electric & Steam Launch Works. The east end is marked with marsh plantation and liable to flood; it was in the same maps measured at 1.775 acres (0.7 ha). Together the parts form the same isle as today.

A bridge was proposed to Middlesex County Council or the Metropolitan Borough of Twickenham in 1889. A set of rope pulleys operated in the early 20th century for assisting transporting light goods. It was not until 1957 that the first bridge to the island was built.

=== Eel Pie Island Hotel ===
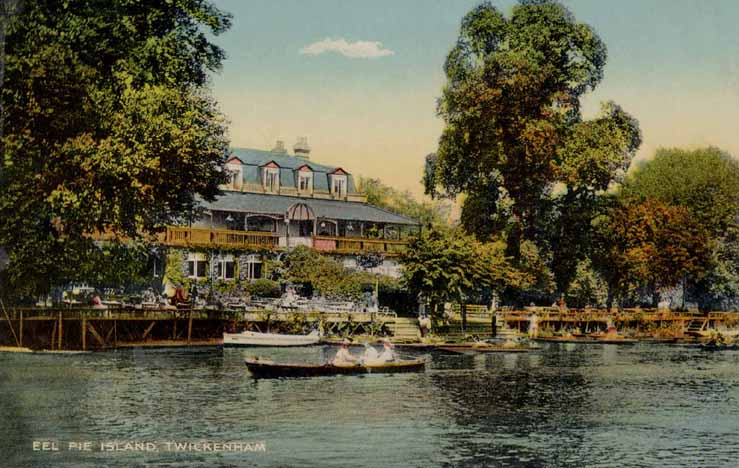
A 1900 postcard of the Eel Pie Island Hotel

The island was the site of the Eel Pie Island Hotel, originally a genteel 19th-century three-storey building that later hosted ballroom dancing during the 1920s and 1930s. In 1956, trumpeter Brian Rutland, who ran a local band called The Grove Jazz Band, started jazz sessions at the newly reopened hotel. Some time afterwards, Arthur Chisnall took over the running of the club and continued to promote various jazz bands and then, in the 1960s, rock and R&B groups.

Famous names who performed at the dance hall between 1957 and 1967 include:

- Long John Baldry's Hoochie Coochie Men (including Rod Stewart)
- Acker Bilk
- Ken Colyer
- Cyril Davies Rhythm & Blues All Stars
- The Downliners Sect
- John Mayall's Bluesbreakers (featuring Eric Clapton)
- George Melly
- The Rolling Stones
- Screaming Lord Sutch
- The Tridents (featuring Jeff Beck)
- The Who
- The Yardbirds
- Pink Floyd

In 1967, the hotel was forced to close because the owner could not meet the £200,000 (equivalent to £3.2 million in 2025) cost of repairs demanded by police. In 1969, the club briefly reopened as Colonel Barefoot's Rock Garden, with bands such as Black Sabbath, The Edgar Broughton Band, Stray, Genesis, and Hawkwind (then known as Hawkwind Zoo) performing there.

Caldwell Smythe (entrepreneur, vocalist, ex-Riot Squad and, briefly, The Honeycombs) said: "I approached the owner, Mr Snapper, who lived in Kingston and we agreed a rental deal. I called it Colonel Barefoot's Rock Garden and plastered west London with quad crown posters." Smythe booked bands such as Edgar Broughton Band, Free, Deep Purple, King Crimson, Genesis, Wishbone Ash and Mott The Hoople. Smythe said: "There were two stages: the headliner was on the big stage and the support on the small stage with the light show projectionist above it. We had a bar doing tea, soft drinks, hot dogs and hamburgers. We then did Colonel Barefoot's Killer Punch (cider, cooking brandy and cinnamon) and we gave it away along with beer in half pint plastic disposable cups. I had rows with the fire department as the emergency exits were chained shut to stop people bunking in. Eventually, after a raid by the Fire Chief, I closed down and walked. I was living in Chiswick at this time."

In 1969, the hotel was occupied by a small group of local anarchists including illustrator Clifford Harper. By 1970 the Eel Pie Island Commune had become the UK's largest hippie commune.

The building had by now fallen into disrepair and was placed under a demolition order. However, in 1971 the Eel Pie Island Hotel burned down in a mysterious fire.

The centre of the island was devastated by fire in 1996, and a year later, the only footbridge to the island was damaged by a utilities contractor. A new footbridge opened in August 1998.

== Description and uses ==
The island has about 50 homes, 120 inhabitants and two or three boatyards, as well as some other small businesses and artists' studios. It has nature reserves at both ends, protected from public access. All plots and walkways are privately owned. The public can access a foreshortened central path, blocked by fences and front gardens from any river views.

=== Artists ===
For brief periods each year, usually in June and December, 26 studios in and around a working boatyard, collectively known as Eel Pie Island Art Studios, open to the public, enabling them to enjoy and buy the artists' works.

=== Sport ===
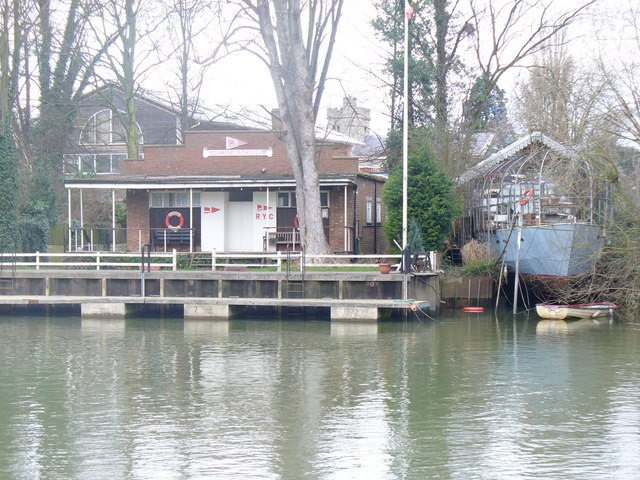
Richmond Yacht Club

The island is home to Twickenham Rowing Club, one of the oldest rowing clubs on the Thames, and Richmond Yacht Club.

== In media, the arts and literature ==
Books

- David Frome, The Eel Pie Murders (1933; repub. 1960), in the "Mr Pinkerton" series, features amateur sleuth Evan Pinkerton, a Welsh widower, and his friend, Chief Inspector J. Humphrey Bull of Scotland Yard.
- Ben Aaronovitch, Rivers of London (2011), novel (US edition called Midnight Riot)
- Ayize Jama-Everett, The Liminal War (2015), second novel in the "Liminal World" trilogy, multiple scenes
- Ian Marchant. A Hero for High Times (2018)
- Ransom Riggs, "The Pigeons of Saint Paul's", in Tales of the Peculiar (2016), short stories
- Cassie Steward, "Wild Summers" (2026) heavily features Eel Pie Island.

Television

- Absolutely Fabulous: (1992) Fashion: Edina's mother inquires whether she has gone to Eel Pie Island again.
- How To Start Your Own Country (2005) presenter Danny Wallace claims to be "Leader" of the island after invading it via the footbridge. After a few hours, the Metropolitan Police Service forced him to give the island back peacefully to Queen Elizabeth II.
- Eel Pie Island Hotel, a 30-minute slot shown frequently on the TV channel Together

Radio

- Sherlock Holmes, 6 June 1948: The Complicated Poisoning at Eel Pie Island. Sherlock Holmes and Watson arrive on Eel Pie Island for a glass of rum and find a poisoning murder. Available here on Youtube

Music

- George Harrison mentions Eel Pie Island in the lyrics of his 1989 song, "Cockamamie Business" which was released on the Best of Dark Horse 1976–1989 compilation album.
- Mystery Jets wrote and recorded on the Eel Pie Island, with their band members being based on the island during the recording of Making Dens and Twenty One.

== Associated places ==
The Eel Pie Studios, also known as the Oceanic Studios, occupies The Boathouse, Twickenham on the mainland about a mile to the north. When owned by Pete Townshend it was adapted and used for international top 100-charting pop and rock recordings. Townshend's publishing company, Eel Pie Publishing, is also named after the ait.

The Eel Pie pub-restaurant in Church Street, Twickenham is named after the former hotel on the island.

== Image gallery ==
Despite its small size, Eel Pie Island has a wide variety of building styles.

Housing on Eel Pie Island

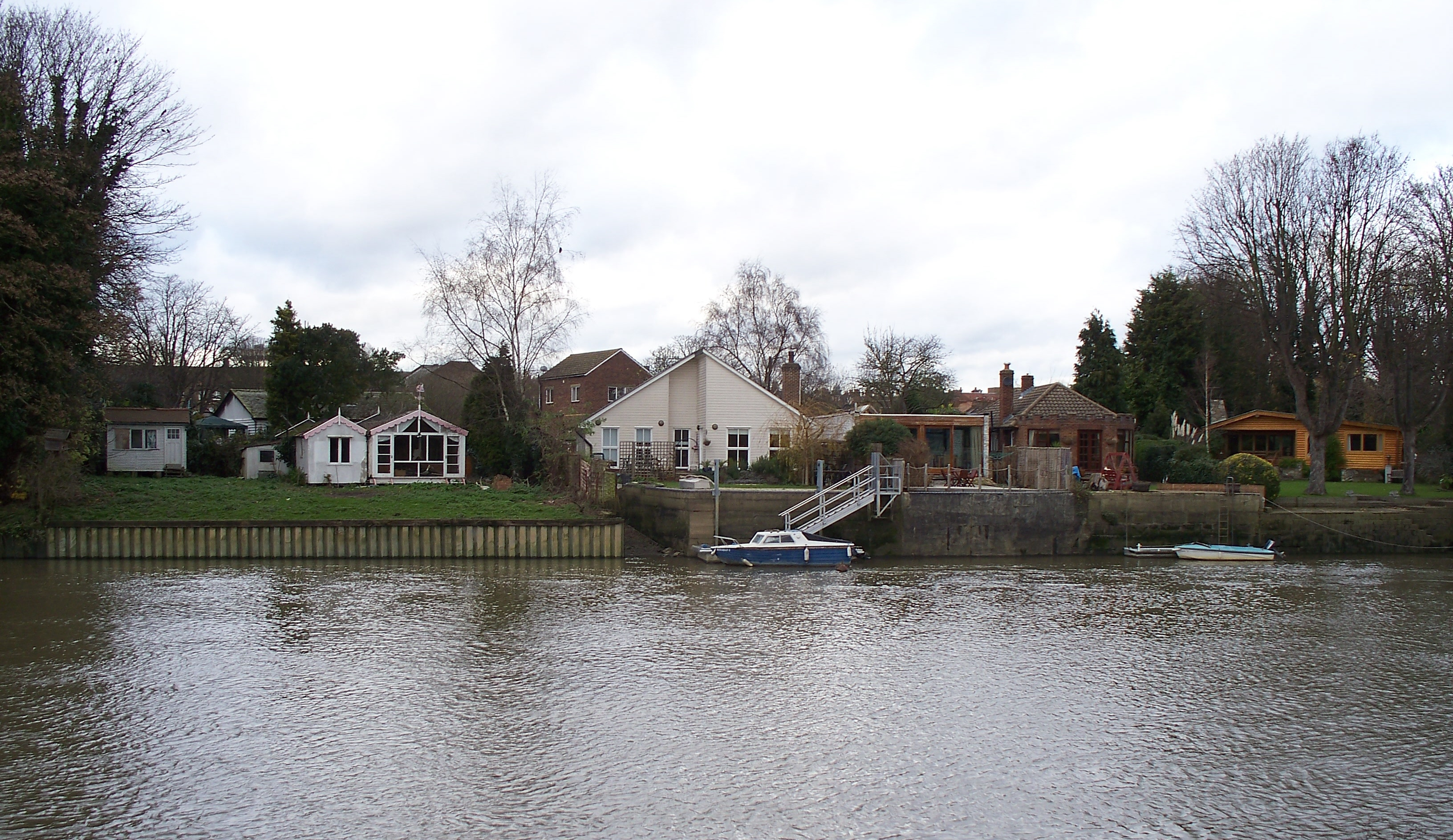

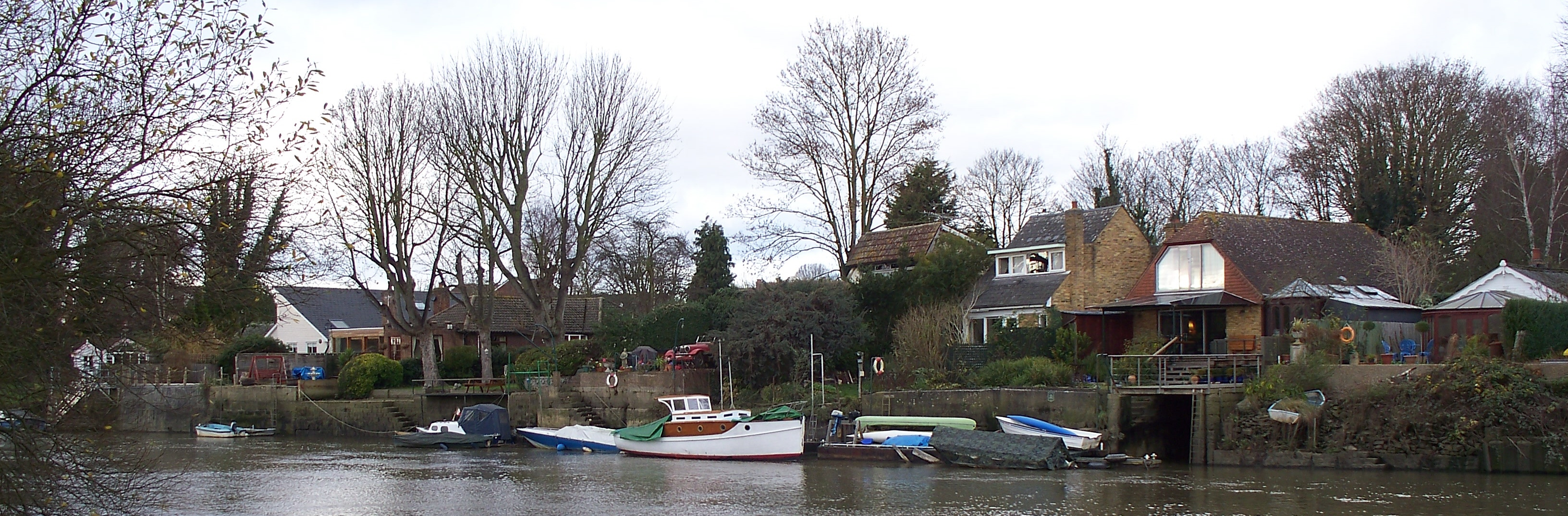

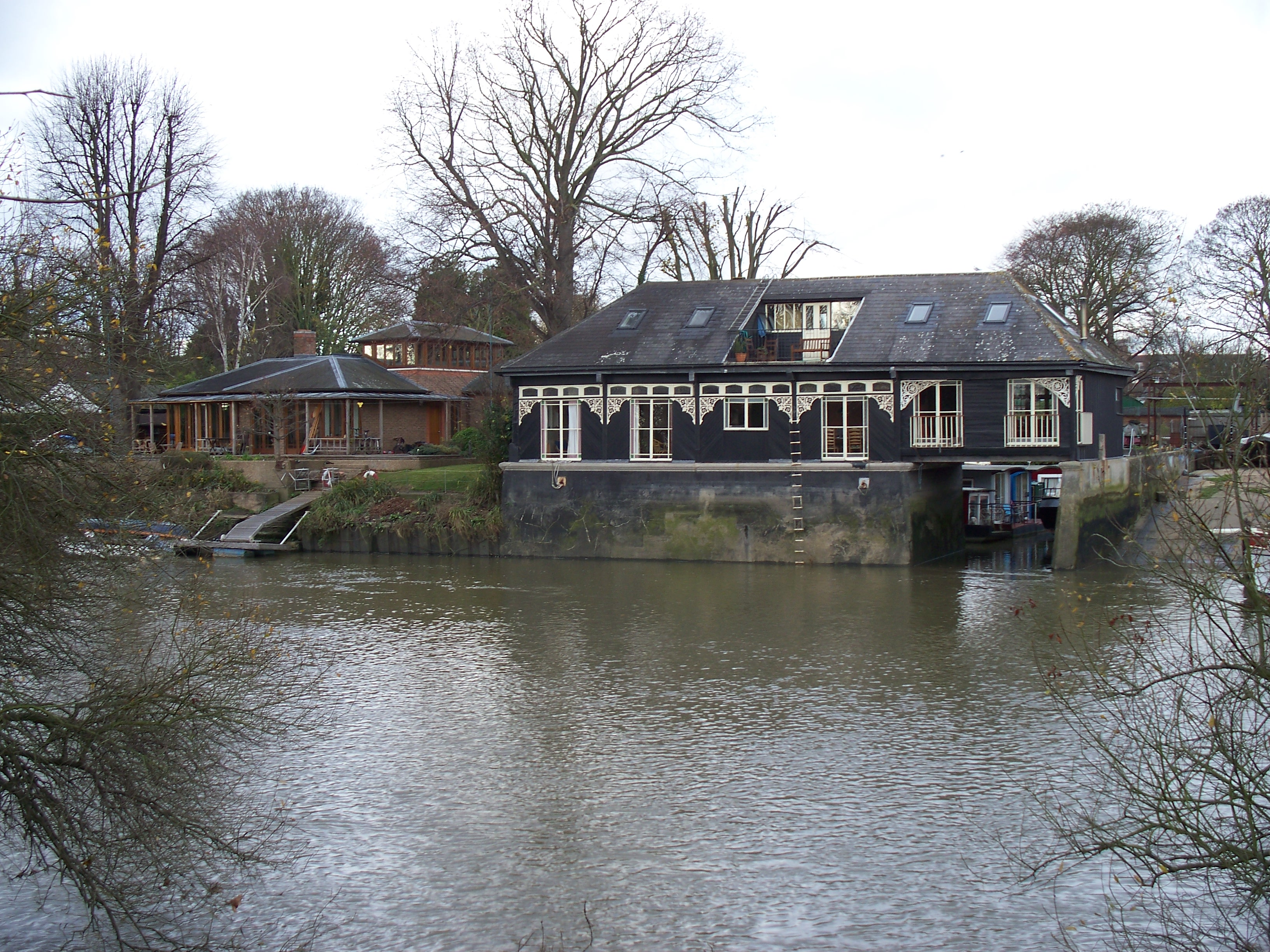

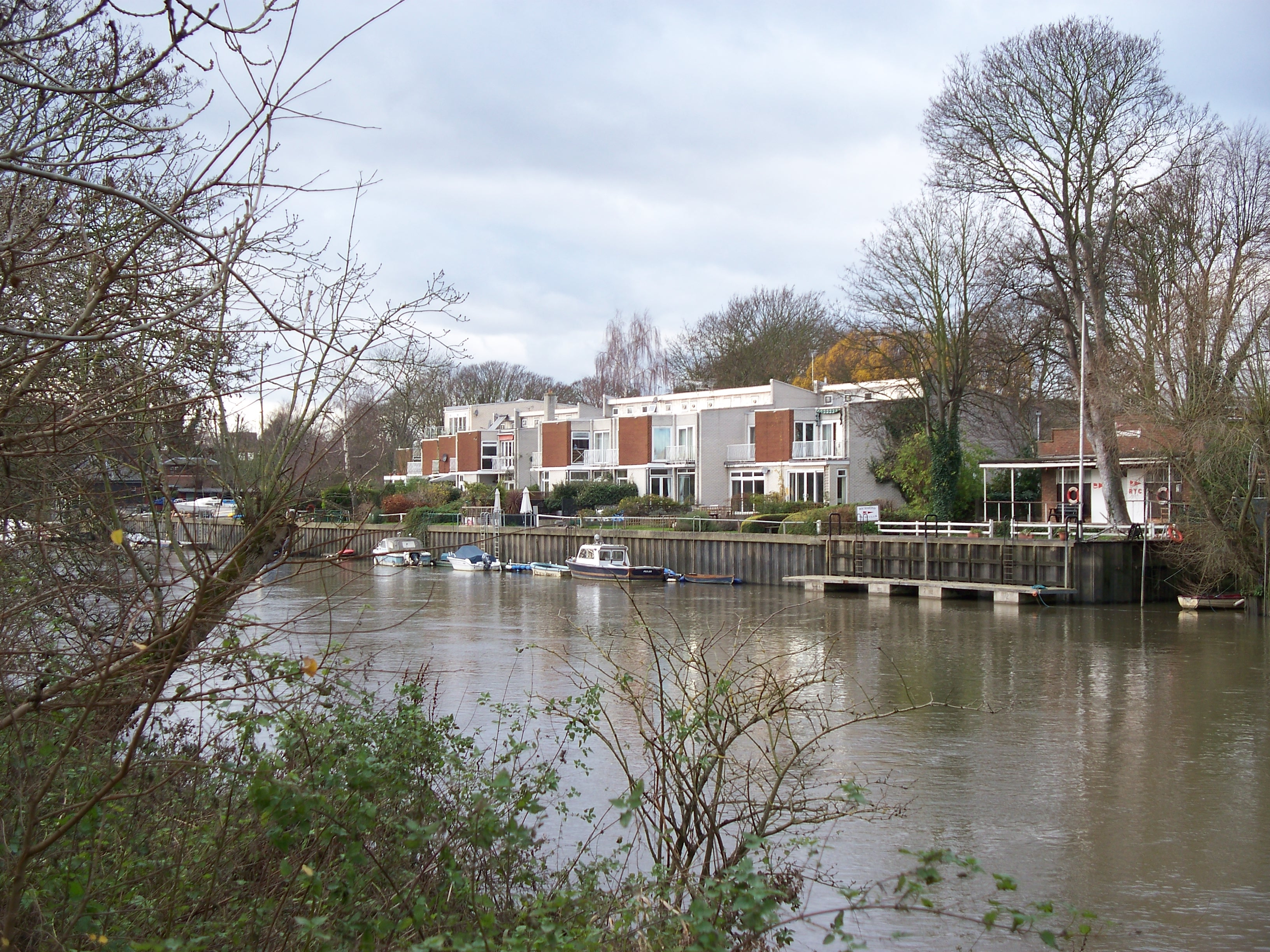

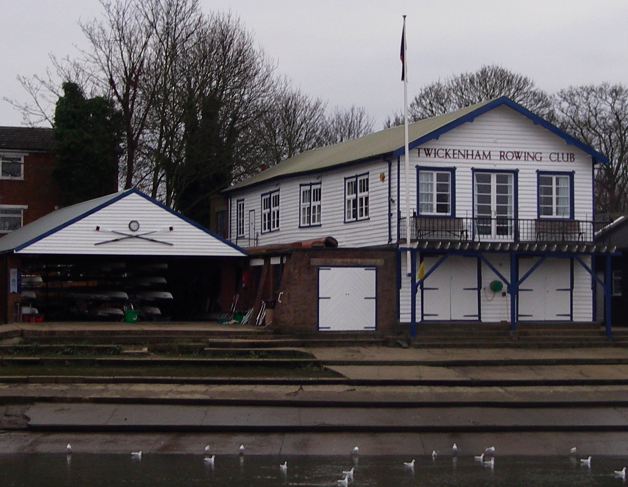

== Notable residents and former residents ==
- Original Doctor Who actor William Hartnell lived in a house on the island during the 1960s.
- Indie band Mystery Jets
- Inventor Trevor Baylis lived on the island for many years.
- Comedy actor Nigel Planer

== See also ==
- Eel pie
- Eel Pie Island Museum
- Islands in the River Thames

Next island upstream	River Thames	Next island downstream
Swan Island	Eel Pie Island; Grid reference TQ164731	Glover's Island
