= List of works of art at Hampton Court Palace =

Artworks at Hampton Court Palace mainly belong to the Royal Collection and are subject to change. They are displayed in several parts of the palace, including the Cumberland Art Gallery. In September 2015, the Royal Collection recorded 542 works (only those with images) as being located at Hampton Court, mostly paintings and furniture, but also ceramics and sculpture. The full current list can be obtained from their website. The paintings as of 2026 include:

- Adam Elsheimer – Witch Riding Backwards on a Goat (c.1596-1598).
- Adam Willaerts – Embarkation at Margate of the Elector Palatine and Princess Elizabeth (c.1623).
- Adriaen van de Velde – Cattle and Sheep Resting under Trees: a Shepherdess Asleep (c.1668).
- Andrea Mantegna – Two of the Triumphs of Caesar (c.1484-92) with the remaining seven on loan to the National Gallery until the refurbishment of Hampton Court's dedicated gallery is completed in May 2027.
- Annibale Carracci – The Madonna and Sleeping Child with the Infant St John the Baptist (c.1599-1600).
- Anthonis Mor – Christina of Denmark (c.1554).
- Sir Anthony van Dyck – The Mystic Marriage of St Catherine (c.1630); the modello for King Charles I on Horseback (c.1635); Princess Mary Stuart (c.1637); Margaret Lemon (c.1638).
- Artemisia Gentileschi – Self-Portrait as the Allegory of Painting (c.1638-39).
- Benozzo Gozzoli – The Fall of Simon Magus (c.1461-62).
- Bernardo Daddi – The Marriage of the Virgin (c.1339-42).
- Bernardo Strozzi – The Concert (c.1635).
- Canaletto – Twelve views of the Grand Canal in Venice (c.1722-30).
- Caravaggio – Boy Peeling Fruit (c.1592-93).
- Carlo Maratti – The Annunciation (c.1660).
- Charles Jervas – Queen Caroline with her Son Prince William Augustus, Duke of Cumberland (c.1728).
- Christoph Schwarz – The Rape of the Sabines (c.1573).
- Correggio – The Holy Family with St Jerome (c.1519); St Catherine Reading (c.1530-32).
- Claude – Harbour Scene at Sunset (c.1643).
- Cornelis van Poelenburgh – Shepherds with their Flocks in a Landscape with Roman Ruins (c.1620-25).
- Daniel Mytens – James Hamilton, 2nd Marquess of Hamilton (c.1622).
- David Morier – Trumpeter, 1st Troop of Horse Guards (c.1750).
- Domenico Fetti – Twelve Paintings of Saints (c.1613-22); David with the Head of Goliath (c.1620); The Sacrifice of Elijah Before the Priests of Baal (c.1621-22).
- Domenico Puligo – Portrait of a Lady (c.1520-30).
- Duccio – Triptych: Crucifixion and other Scenes (c.1302-08).
- Sir Edwin Landseer – Queen Victoria and Prince Albert at the Bal Costumé (c.1842).
- Fra Angelico – Saint Peter Martyr (c.1430-50).
- Francesco Vecellio – Lucretia (c.1530); The Marriage of Saint Catherine (c.1520-40).
- Frank Holl – No Tidings from the Sea (c.1870).
- Frans Pourbus the Younger – Infanta Isabella Clara Eugenia, Archduchess of Austria (c.1598-1600).
- Frans Snyders – A Boar Hunt (c.1653).
- Frans van Mieris the Elder – A Man Smoking, and a Woman (c.1660-65).
- Frans Wouters – Landscape with a Rainbow (c.1634).
- Gerrit Dou – A Couple Reading by Candlelight (c.1650-75).
- Gerrit van Honthorst – Apollo and Diana (c.1628); Elizabeth, Queen of Bohemia (c.1632-37).
- Giovanni Batista Caracciolo – Cupid Sleeping (c.1618).
- Giovanni Benedetto Castiglione – Juno Seeking from Jupiter the Gift of Io Transformed (c.1637-40).
- Giovanni Girolamo Savoldo – Portrait of a Man with a Hawk (c.1510-15).
- Girolamo da Treviso – The Four Evangelists Stoning the Pope (c.1538-1544).
- Giulio Romano – The Emperor Nero on Horseback (c.1536-39); The Emperor Otto on Horseback (c.1536-39).
- Sir Godfrey Kneller – Hampton Court Beauties (c.1690s); William, Duke of Gloucester (c.1699); William III on Horseback (c.1701); Henry Wise (c.1715); Mehemet (c.1715); George I (c.1715-27); George II when Prince of Wales (c.1716).
- Hans Holbein – William Reskimer (c.1536-39); Portrait of Henry VIII (c.1542).
- Hans Vredeman de Vries – Christ in the House of Martha and Mary (c.1566).
- Hendrick Danckerts – Hampton Court Palace (c.1665-67).
- Jacob de Formentrou – A Cabinet of Pictures (c.1659).
- Jacob Huysmans – Frances Stewart, later Duchess of Richmond (c.1664).
- Jacopo Amigoni – William, Duke of Cumberland (c.1730-35); Boys Playing with a Goat (c.1735); Three Boys Playing with a Lamb (c.1735).
- Jacopo Bassano – Portrait of a Man Holding Gloves (c.1555-60).
- James Digman Wingfield – A Summer Afternoon at Hampton Court (c.1844); The King’s Bedchamber at Hampton Court Palace (c.1849).
- Jan Brueghel the Elder – A Flemish Fair (c.1600); Adam and Eve in the Garden of Eden (c.1615).
- Jan de Baen – William III when Prince of Orange (c.1667).
- Jan de Bray – The Banquet of Cleopatra (c.1652).
- Jan Porcellis – A View of a Bay with Shipping (c.1624).
- Jan Wyck – The French Army crossing the Rhine, 12 June 1672 (c.1674-97)
- Johann Rottenhammer the Elder – Venus, Mars, and Vulcan (c.1604-05).
- Joos van Cleve – Portrait of Francois I (c.1530); Portrait of Henry VIII (c.1530-35).
- Justus of Ghent – Federico da Montefeltro, Duke of Urbino, Listening to a Discourse (c.1480).
- Karel du Jardin – A Muleteer and two Men playing the Game of Morra (c.1650-52).
- Karel van Mander – Christian IV, King of Denmark (c.1640).
- Leonard Knyff – A View of Hampton Court (c.1702-14).
- Luca Giordano – Twelve coppers depicting the story of Cupid and Psyche (c.1695-1697).
- Maarten van Heemskerck – Jonah Under His Gourd (c.1561).
- Marcus Gheeraerts the Younger – Portrait of a Woman (c.1590-1600).
- Marco Palmezzano – Portrait of a Man (c.1500-05).
- Mathias Kauage – Missus Kwin (c.1996).
- Nicolaes Berchem – A Shepherdess Carrying a Kid across a Ford (c.1658); A Shepherd and Shepherdess with Flocks (c.1645).
- Orazio Gentileschi – Joseph and Potiphar’s Wife (c.1630-32); A Sibyl (c.1635-38).
- Paulus Bril – A Landscape with Goatherds (c.1620).
- Paulus Moreelse – Portrait of a Young Boy (c.1634).
- Paul van Somer – Anne of Denmark (c.1617).
- Perugino – Saint Jerome in Penitence (c.1480-85).
- Sir Peter Lely – Windsor Beauties (c.1660s); Anne Hyde, Duchess of York (c.1662); Mary II, when Princess of Orange (c.1677).
- Sir Peter Paul Rubens – Pythagoras Advocating Vegetarianism (c.1628-30); Diana and her Nymphs Spied upon by Satyrs (c.1616).
- Petrus van Schendel – Market Scene by Night (c.1844).
- Philips Wouwerman – A Skirmish of Cavalry (c.1646); The Farrier of the Camp (c.1650); Cavalry at a Sutler's Booth (c.1650-59).
- Pieter de Hooch – The Music Party (c.1667).
- Pieter Gerritsz van Roestraten – A Vanitas (c.1666-1700).
- Pietro Liberi – A Mythological Subject (c.1660-65); The Three Graces (c.1670-80).
- Rembrandt – An Old Woman called 'The Artist's Mother' (c.1627-29).
- Remigius van Leemput – The Allegory of the Tudor Succession (c.1667), copy of Holbein's lost work.
- Roelandt Savery – A Landscape with Birds (c.1615); Lions in a Landscape (c.1622).
- Salomon van Ruysdael – A River Landscape with Sailing Boats (c.1651).
- Sebastiano Ricci – Aurora and Tithonus (c.1705); Christ and the Woman of Samaria (c.1724); Christ and the Woman who Believed (c.1724); The Magdalen Anointing Christ's feet (c.1720-30).
- Sir Thomas Gainsborough – Diana and Actaeon (c.1785-88).
- Tintoretto – The Virgin and Child (c.1545).
- Trophime Bigot – Christ in the Carpenters Shop (c.1600-50).
- Veronese – Judith with the Head of Holofernes (c.1560-69); David Victorious over Goliath (c.1565-69).
- Willem van Aelst – Dead Game with Trophies of the Chase (c.1657).
- Willem van de Velde the Elder & Willem van de Velde the Younger – Twelve seascapes depicting the Second and Third Anglo-Dutch Wars (c.1675-82).
- William Scrots – Edward VI (c.1550).
- Zanobi Strozzi – The Madonna of Humility with Angels (c.1440-50).
- Unknown Artists – Tudor History Paintings of Battle of the Spurs (c.1513-20); The Battle of Pavia (c.1530); Field of Cloth of Gold (c.1545); Embarkation of Henry VIII at Dover (c.1545).
- Unknown Artists – Royal Portraits of Elizabeth of York (c. 1470-98); Arthur, Prince of Wales (c.1500); Emperor Maximilian I (c.1500-19); The Family of Henry VII with St George and the Dragon (c.1503-9); Charles V (c.1514-16); The Family of Henry VIII (c.1545); Katherine of Aragon (c.1550-1599); Henry VIII (c.1550-1599); Elizabeth Woodville (c.1560-1600); Margaret Beaufort (c.1550-1600); Anne Boleyn (c.1550-1699); Elizabeth I (c.1580-85); James I (c.1632-99); William III, with a Page (c.1689-1832).
- Painted ceilings by Antonio Verrio, James Thornhill, and William Kent.

Apart from the paintings some important tapestries are displayed, including:

- The Story of Abraham – Flemish, set of 10 tapestries commissioned by Henry VIII in the early 1540s, 6 of which are displayed in the Great Hall.
- The Triumph of Fame over Death – Flemish, c.1500-23, purchased by Cardinal Wolsey from the executors of the Bishop of Durham's will in 1523.
- Conflict of Virtues and Vice – Flemish, c.1500, probably bought by Cardinal Wolsey in 1522.
- The Story of Alexander the Great – Brussels, late 17th century, in the Queen's Gallery.
- The Labours of Hercules & The Triumph of Bacchus – Brussels, purchased by Henry VIII in the 1540s, in the King's Presence Chamber.
