= Eel Pie Island Museum =

Museum in the London Borough of Richmond upon Thames, England

Coordinates: 51.4482°N 0.3255°W

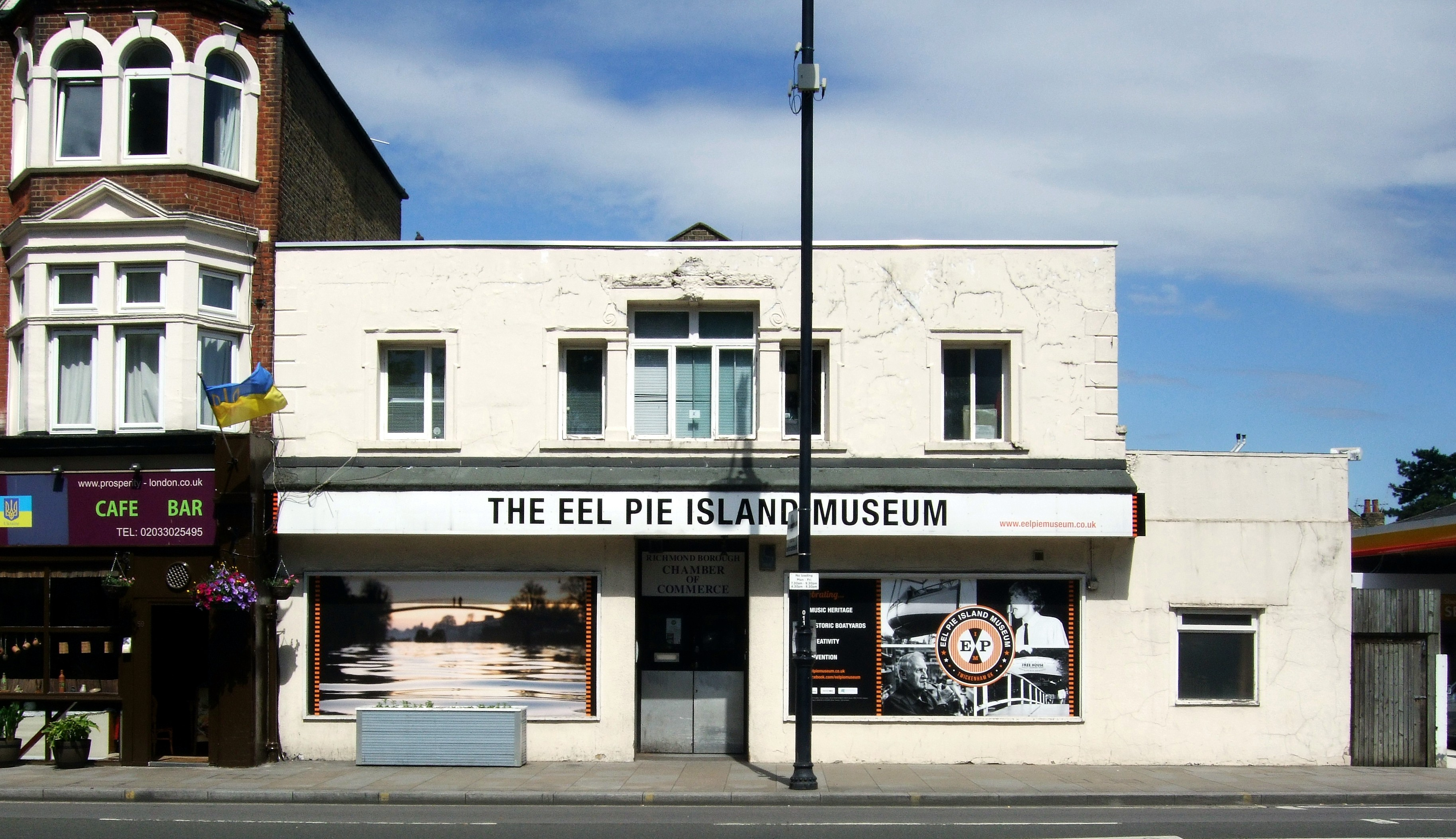
- Established: February 2018; 8 years ago
- Location: 1–3 Richmond Road, Twickenham, London Borough of Richmond upon Thames
- Type: History museum; music museum
- Founder: Michele Whitby
- Curator: Michele Whitby
- Public transit access: Twickenham
- Website: www.eelpiemuseum.co.uk

Eel Pie Island Museum is a volunteer-run museum on Richmond Road in Twickenham in the London Borough of Richmond upon Thames. It opened in February 2018 and tells the story of Eel Pie Island, including its historic boatyards (some of whose boats took part in the evacuation of Dunkirk in 1940), its contribution to the development of the popular music scene in the 1960s (the island had a hotel whose ballroom hosted some important music acts), and the life of the wind-up radio inventor, Trevor Baylis, who was a resident of the island. The museum's founder and curator is Michele Whitby.
