= Estelle May Hurll =

American art analyst and author

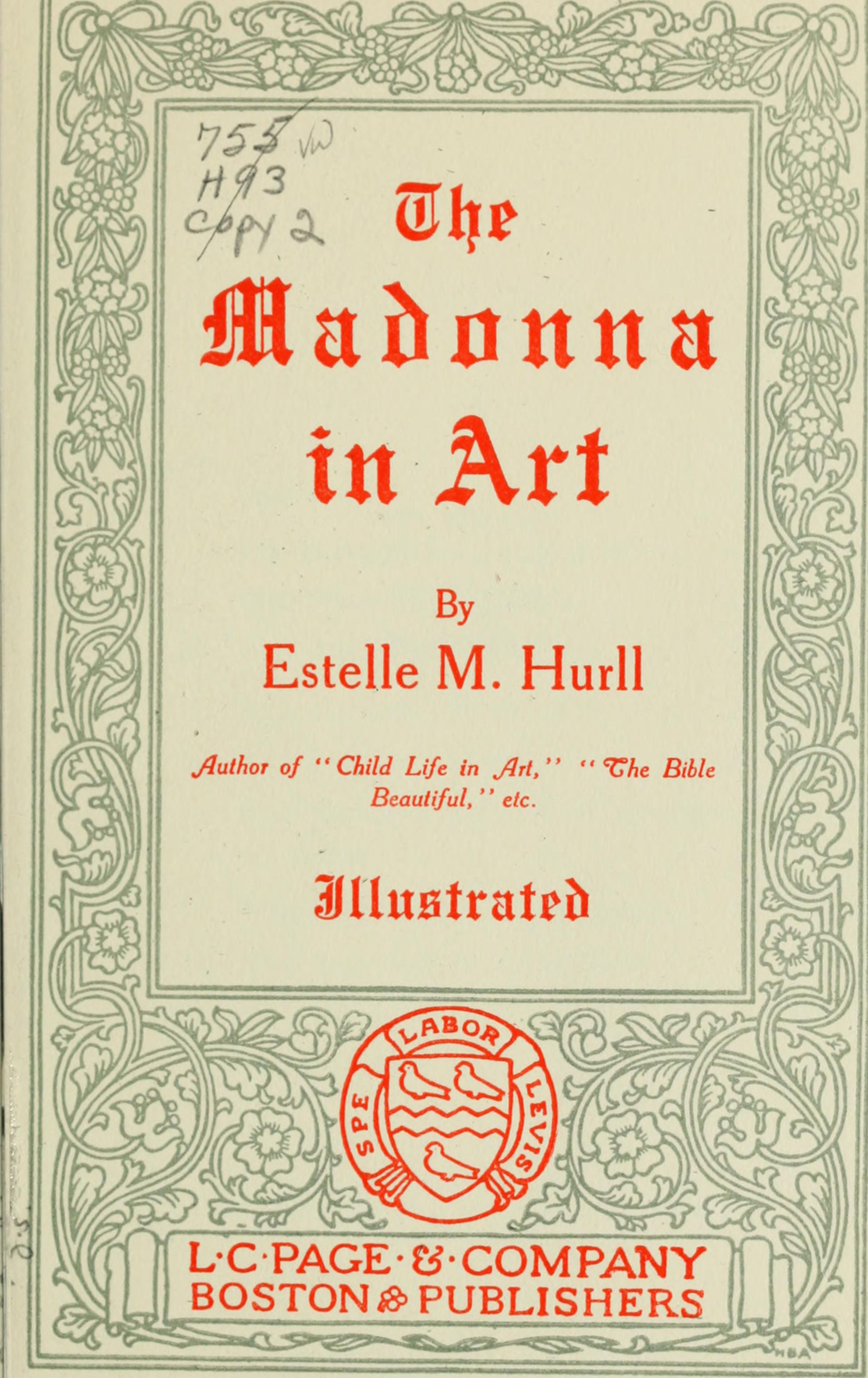
The Madonna in art (1897)

Estelle May Hurll (1863–1924), a student of aesthetics, wrote a series of popular aesthetic analyses of art in the early twentieth century.

Hurll was born 25 July 1863 in New Bedford, Massachusetts, daughter of Charles W. and Sarah Hurll. She attended Wellesley College, graduating in 1882. From 1884 to 1891 she taught ethics at Wellesley. Hurll received her A.M. from Wellesley in 1892. In earning her degree, Hurll wrote Wellesley's first master's thesis in philosophy under Mary Whiton Calkins; her thesis was titled "The Fundamental Reality of the Aesthetic." After earning her degree, Hurll engaged in a short career writing introductions and interpretations of art, but these activities ceased before she married John Chambers Hurll on 29 June 1908.

== Works ==
- Child-life in Art (1895)
- The Madonna in Art (1897)
- Rembrandt; A Collection of Fifteen Pictures and a Portrait of the Painter with Introduction and Interpretation (1899)
- Raphael: A Collection of Fifteen Pictures and a Portrait of the Painter with Introduction and Interpretation (1899)
- Sir Joshua Reynolds; A Collection of Fifteen Pictures and a Portrait of the Painter with Introduction and Interpretation (1900)
- Jean-François Millet; A Collection of Fifteen Pictures and a Portrait of the Painter with Introduction and Interpretation (1900)
- Michelangelo: A Collection of Fifteen Pictures and a Portrait of the Painter with Introduction and Interpretation (1900)
- Landseer: A Collection of Fifteen Pictures and a Portrait of the Painter with Introduction and Interpretation (1901)
- Correggio; A Collection of Fifteen Pictures and a Portrait of the Painter with Introduction and Interpretation (1901)
- Titian; A Collection of Fifteen Pictures and a Portrait of the Painter with Introduction and Interpretation (1901)
- Greek Sculpture; A Collection of Sixteen Pictures of Greek Marbles (1901)
- Tuscan Sculpture of the Fifteenth Century; A Collection of Sixteen Pictures Reproducing Works by Donatello, the Della Robia, Mino da Fiesole, and Others, with Introduction (1902)
- Van Dyck; A Collection of Fifteen Pictures and a Portrait of the Painter with Introduction and Interpretation (1902)
- The Bible beautiful; a history of Biblical art (1905)

=== Works Edited ===
- Sacred and Legendary Art, by Mrs. Anna Jameson, ed. by Estelle M. Hurll (1895)
- Memoirs of early Italian Painters, by Mrs. Anna Jameson, ed. by Estelle M. Hurll (1895)
