= Night in paintings (Western art) =

Overview of nighttime themes in European art

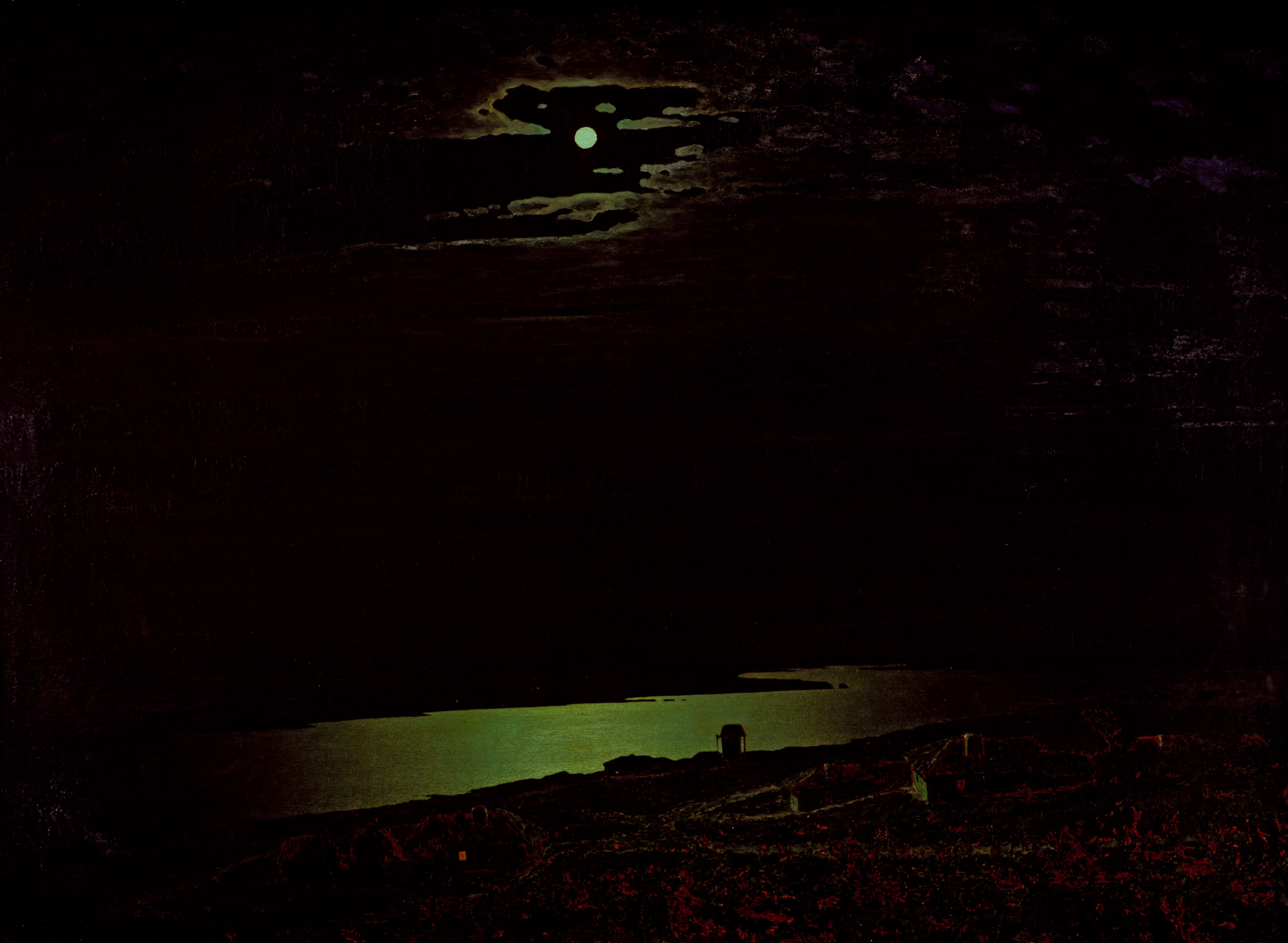
Archip Kuindshi, Moonlit Night on the Dnieper 1882

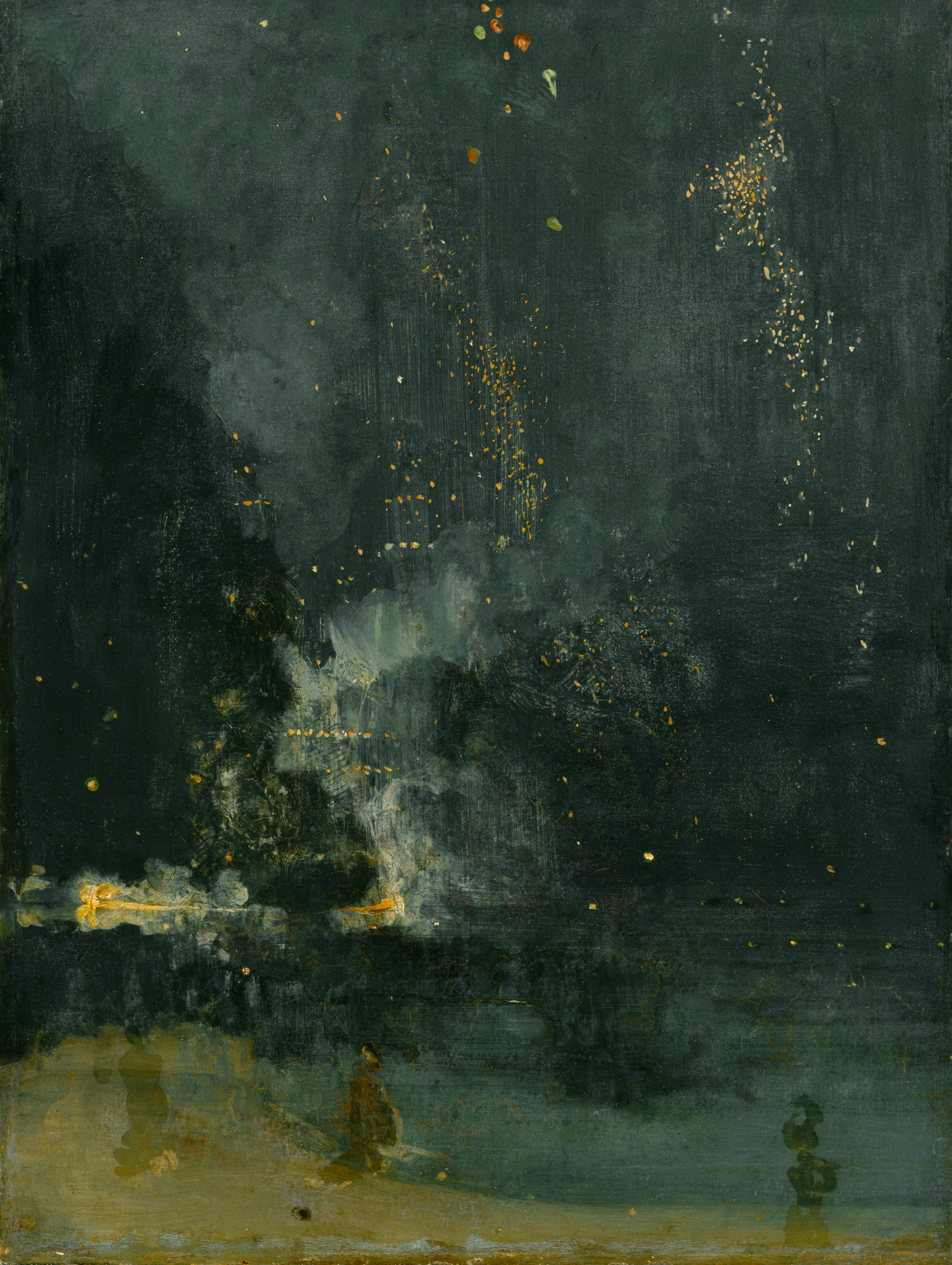
James Abbott McNeill Whistler, Nocturne in Black and Gold – The Falling Rocket, 1874

The depiction of night in paintings is common in Western art. Paintings that feature a night scene as the theme may be religious or history paintings, genre scenes, portraits, landscapes, or other subject types. Some artworks involve religious or fantasy topics using the quality of dim night light to create mysterious atmospheres. The source of illumination in a night scene—whether it is the moon or an artificial light source—may be depicted directly, or it may be implied by the character and coloration of the light that reflects from the subjects depicted. They are sometimes called nocturnes, or night-pieces, such as Rembrandt's The Night Watch, or the German Romantic Caspar David Friedrich's Two Men Contemplating the Moon of 1819.

In America, James Abbott McNeill Whistler titled works as nocturnes to identify those paintings with a "dreamy, pensive mood" by applying the musical term, and likewise also titled (and retitled) works using other music expressions, such as a "symphony", "harmony", "study" or "arrangement", to emphasize the tonal qualities and the composition and to de-emphasize the narrative content. The use of the term "nocturne" can be associated with the Tonalist movement of the American of the late 19th century and early 20th century which is "characterized by soft, diffused light, muted tones and hazy outlined objects, all of which imbue the works with a strong sense of mood." Along with winter scenes, nocturnes were a common Tonalist theme. Frederic Remington used the term as well for his nocturne scenes of the American Old West.

== History ==
=== 14th century ===
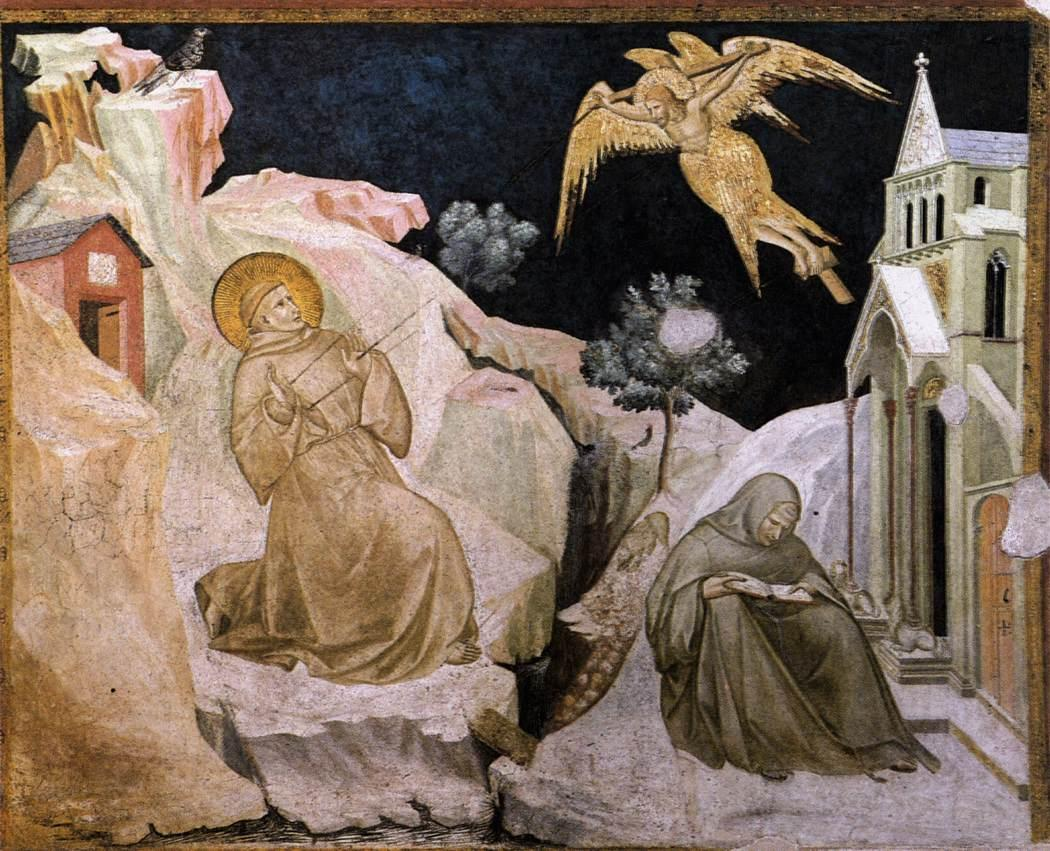
Pietro Lorenzetti, c. 1320, Stigmata of St Francis, Basilica of San Francesco d'Assisi

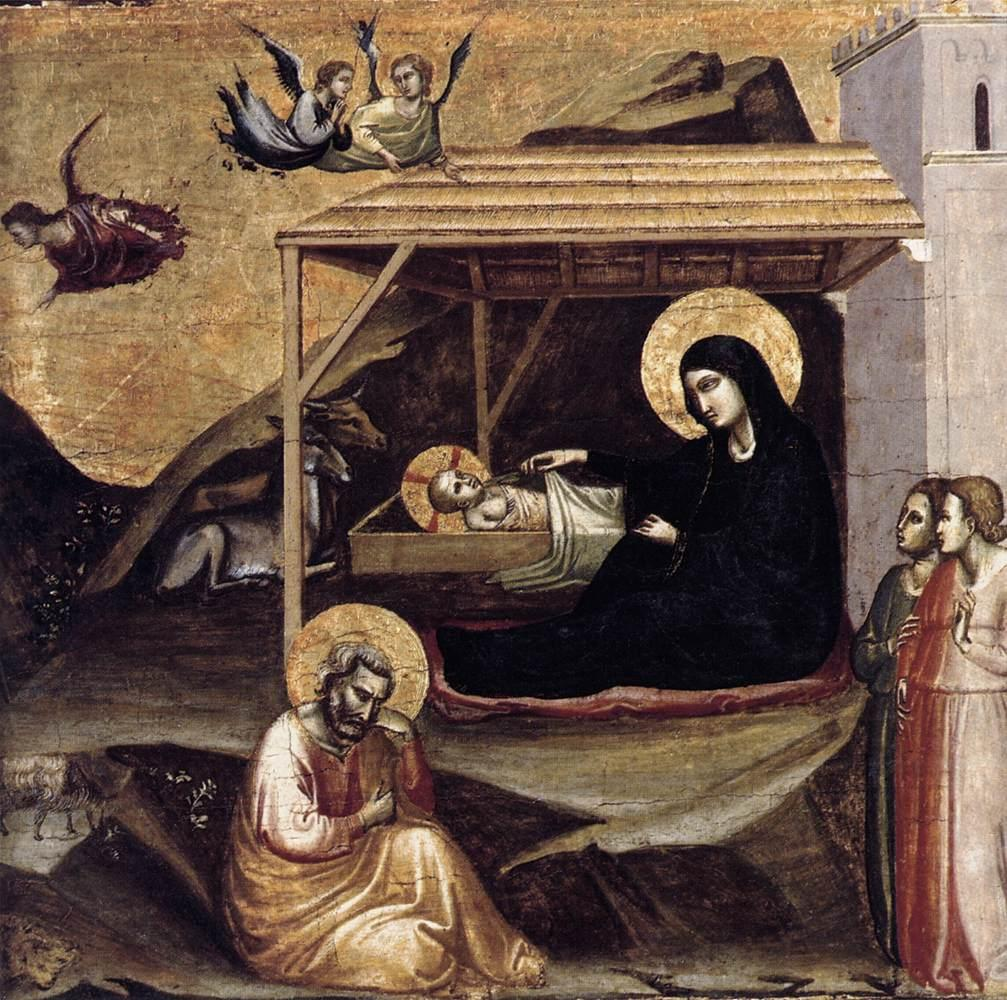
Taddeo Gaddi, Nativity, circa 1325, Fundación Colección Thyssen-Bornemisza, Pedralbes

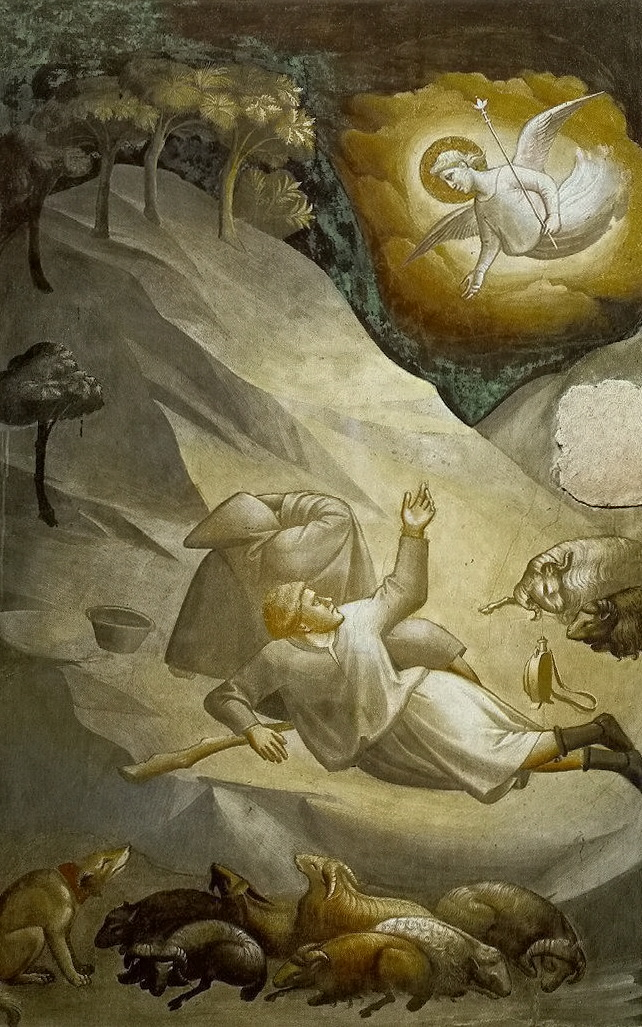
Taddeo Gaddi, The Angelic Announcement to the Shepherds, Fresco in the Basilica of Santa Croce, Florence, 1332–1338

==== Gaddi, The Angelic Announcement to the Shepherds ====
One of the first attempts in depicting night in paintings was by Taddeo Gaddi, an Italian painter and architect. Gaddi, fascinated by nocturnal lighting, depicted the effect of the light in The Angelic Announcement to the Shepherds night scene. The fresco at Basilica of Santa Croce in Florence, Italy features an incandescent angel as it hovers over a shepherd. Against the night sky the brilliance of the angel's bright glow, likely intended as "verification of the presence of God and as a metaphor for spiritual enlightenment", appears to startle the shepherd. Gaddi's use of monochromatic colors in and around the shepherd reveals how the colors are made pale due to the remarkable illumination. (Note: A student and godson of Giotto di Bondone, Gaddi was influenced by Giotti's exploration away from traditional Medieval artistic works towards development of solid three-dimensional characters using contrasting dark and light shades to suggest depth and shape. The technique was a precursor to chiaroscuro. Gaddi may have sought to leverage this technique to its best advantage after having accepted the prominent commission for the church fresco early in his career to impress the public and his patrons. Thyssen-Bornemisza Museum (Note: Thyssen-Bornemisza Museum has in its collection Taddeo Gaddi's Nativity which was made about 1325.) notes that: "This ensemble [The Angelic Announcement to the Shepherds] is noted for its dynamism, pronounced foreshortening, dramatic effects of light and interest in narrative." This is evidenced by the impact Gaddi's work had on successive church murals, such as the nearby Rinuccini Chapel's mural made about 40 years later.)

==== Giotto, Crucifixion ====
Giotto di Bondone (1266/7–1337), Taddeo Gaddi's teacher and godfather, (Note: Giotto was an Italian painter in the late Middle Ages and generally considered a key contributor to the Italian Renaissance. In his day medieval paintings depicted flat, relatively unemotional people. Giotto, revolutionary for the 13th century, portrayed natural, three-dimensional people.) created the fresco of Crucifixion, one of the multiple frescoes that told the story of Christ's life, for the Arena Chapel. He depicts Christ on a cross, while the Virgin Mary is comforted by John. Kneeling at his feet is Mary Magdalene, and swirling in the sky above Jesus and the watching crowd's heads are a number of angels. Giotto depicts night and heaven through the use of a deep blue background in the fresco panel and use of stars in the otherwise blue ceiling. He was able to create depth and dimension through the use of incremental degrees of light and dark shades, the precursor to chiaroscuro. He also used light in a way to represent the divinity of people and angels from the Bible, as he did in other frescoes at Arena Chapel.

=== 15th century ===
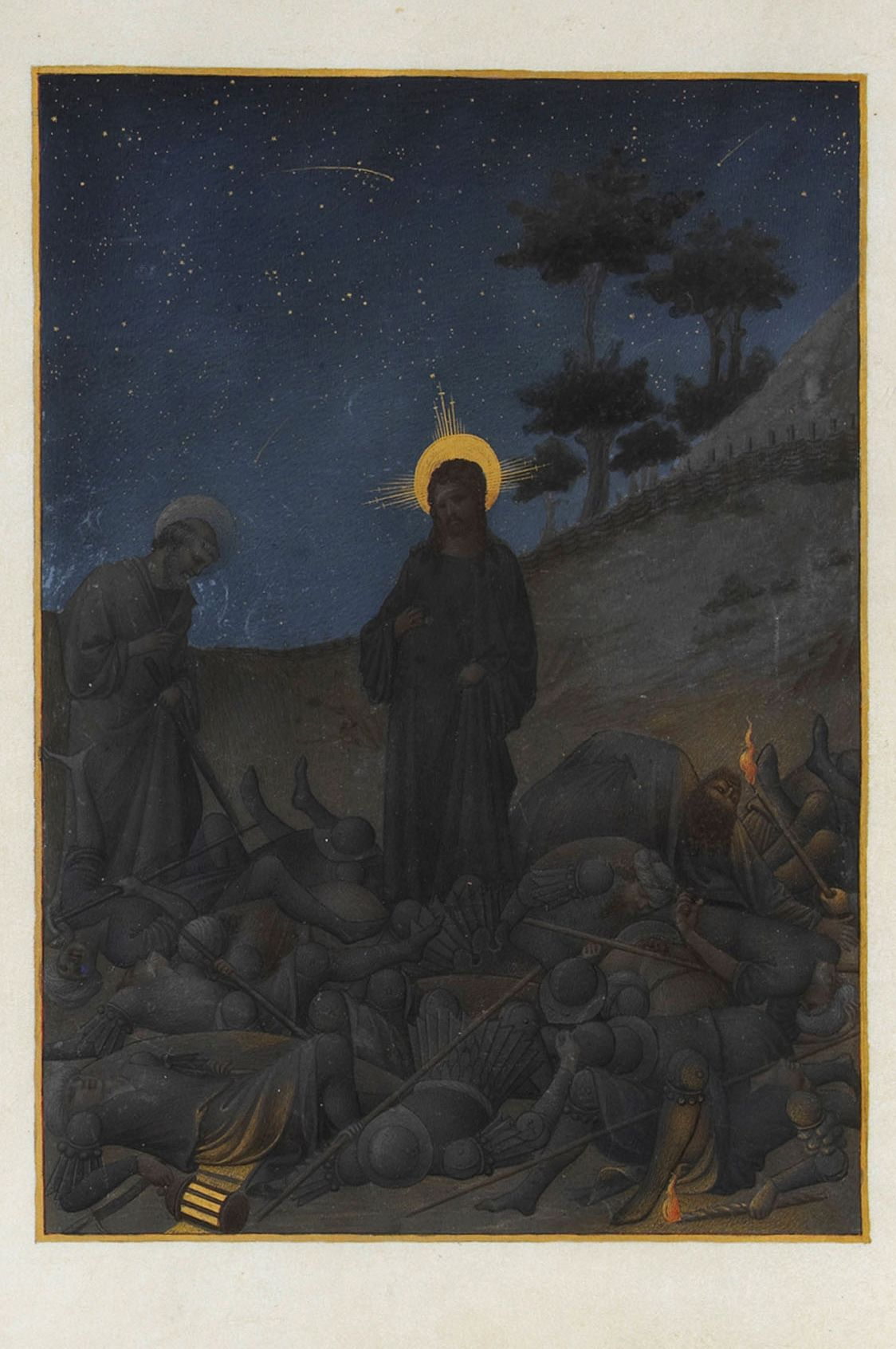
Très Riches Heures du Duc de Berry, Christ in Gethsemane, c. 1411–1416

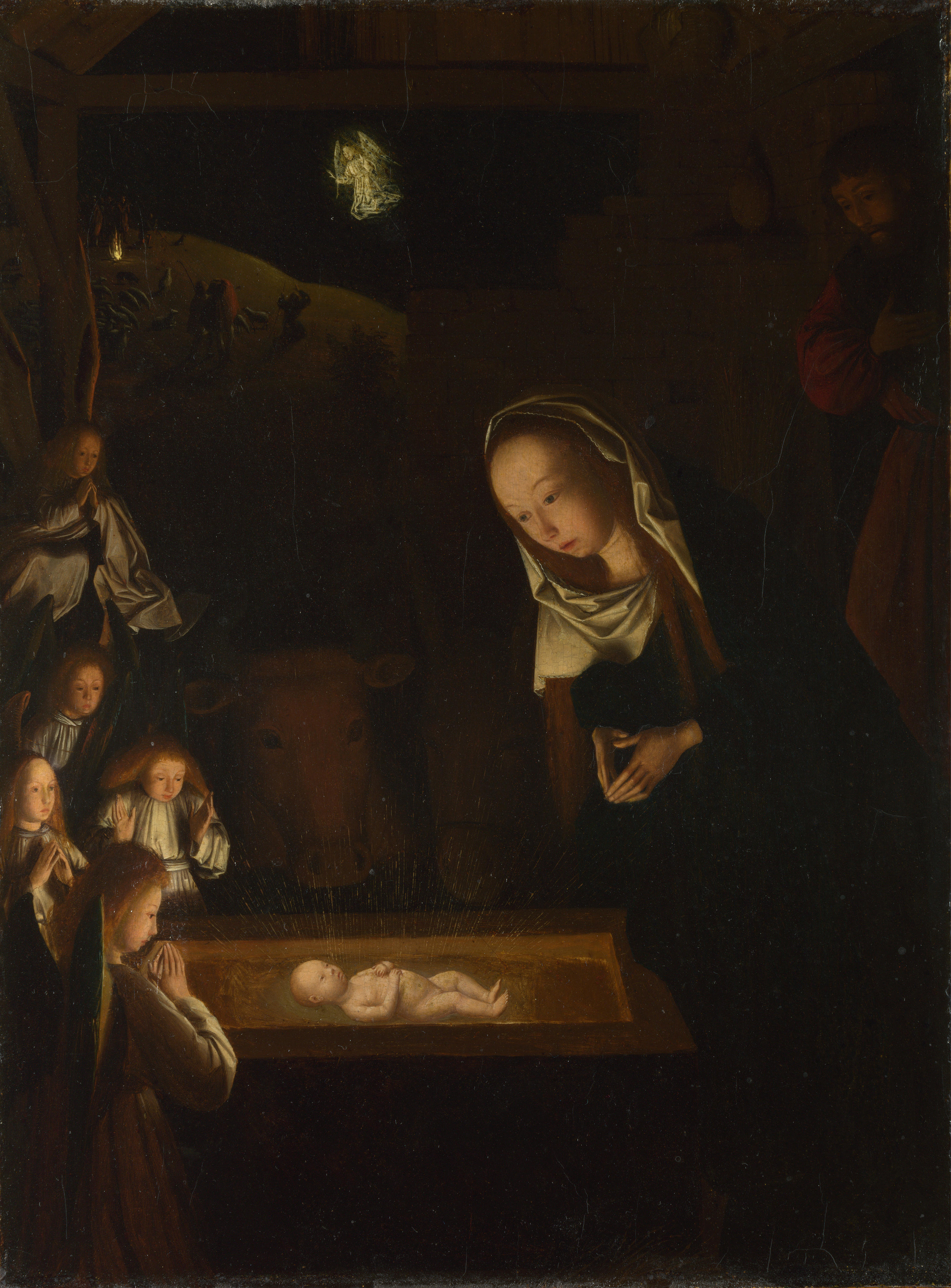
Geertgen tot Sint Jans, Nativity at Night c. 1490

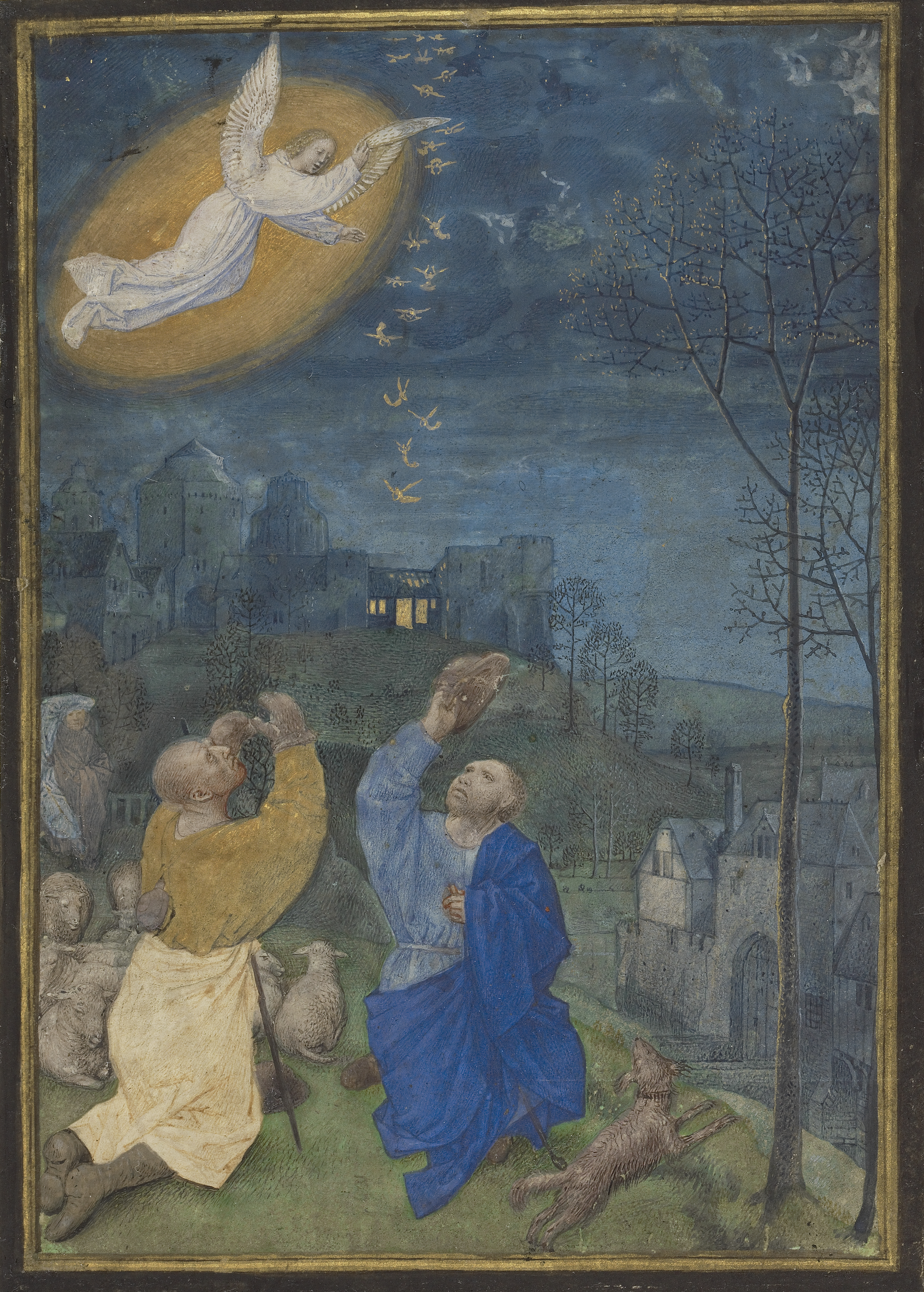
Master of the Houghton Miniatures, Annunciation to the Shepherds, (Flemish miniature ) c. late 15th century, J. Paul Getty Museum

The Western tradition began properly in the 15th century, especially with depictions in illuminated manuscripts of the biblical night-time scenes of the Annunciation to the Shepherds in the Nativity story, and the Arrest of Christ and Agony in the Garden in the Passion of Christ.

==== Très Riches Heures, Christ in Gethsemane ====
In the book of miniatures, Très Riches Heures du Duc de Berry, the scene of Christ in Gethsemane is an apcolyptic one which foretells the death of Christ, through the presence of three comets in the evening sky.

==== Uccello, Niccolò Mauruzi da Tolentino at the Battle of San Romano ====
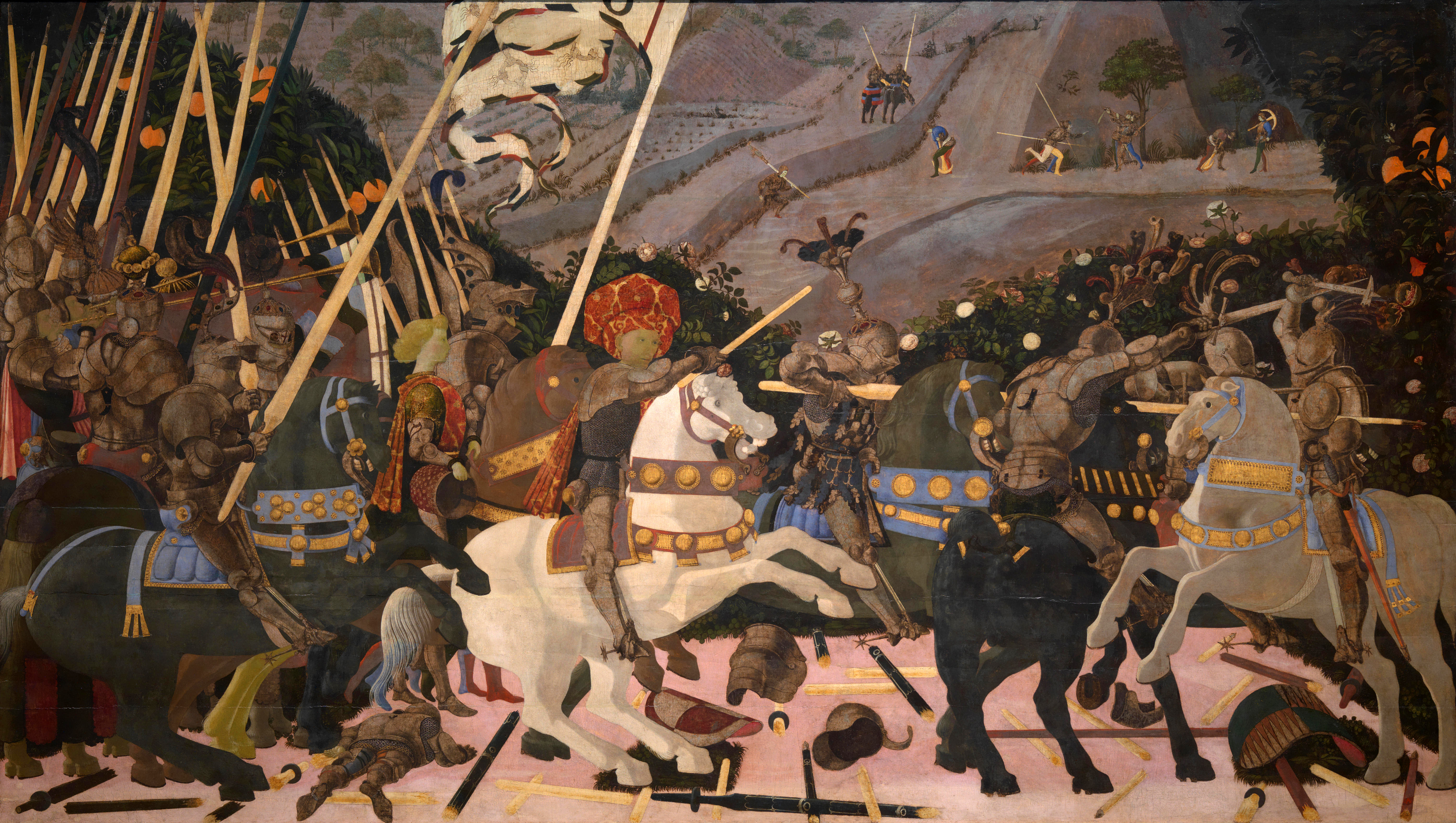
Paolo Uccello, Niccolò Mauruzi da Tolentino at the Battle of San Romano, left panel. National Gallery, London

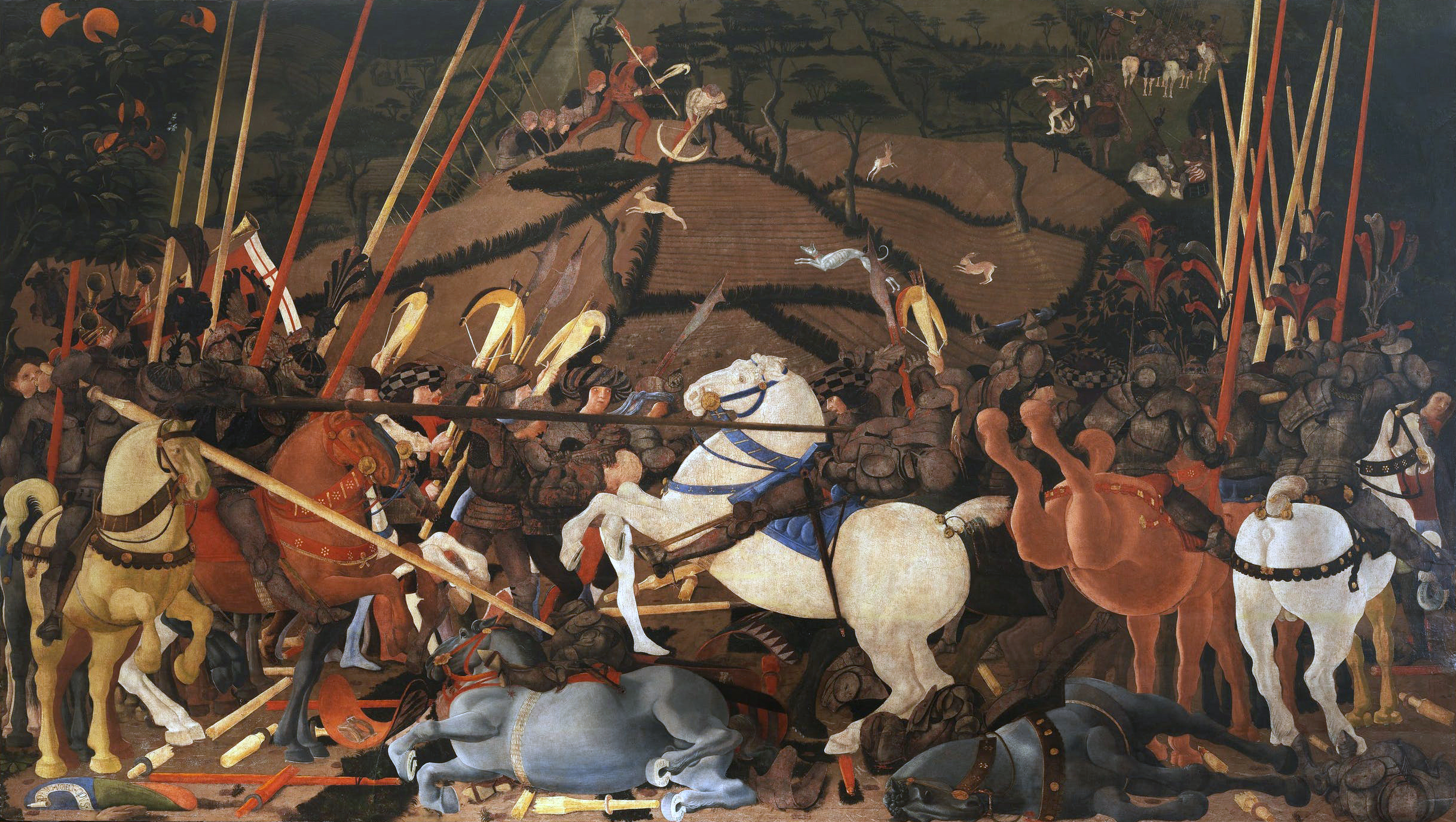
Paolo Uccello, Niccolò Mauruzi da Tolentino unseats Bernardino della Ciarda at the Battle of San Romano, center panel. Galleria degli Uffizi, Florence

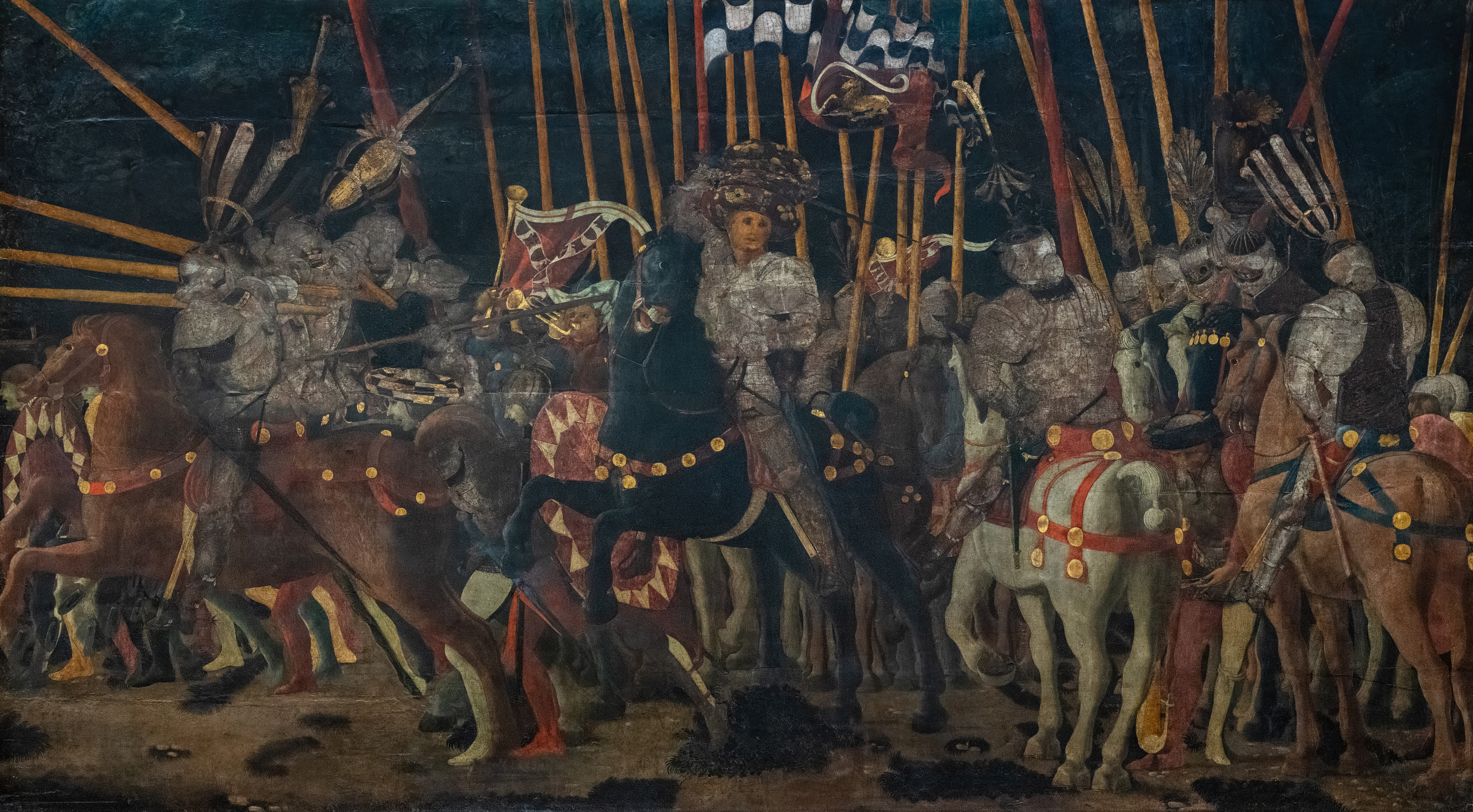
Paolo Uccello, The Counterattack of Michelotto da Cotignola at the Battle of San Romano, right panel. Musée du Louvre, Paris

Niccolò Mauruzi da Tolentino at the Battle of San Romano is one of a three painting series that captures the Battle of San Romano. The passage of time, from dawn to evening, is illustrated in the three paintings with the initial use of pale, pastel shades and increasingly darker tones as the battle progresses.

==== Geertgen, Nativity at Night ====
Influenced by a vision of Saint Bridget of Sweden (1303–1373), Geertgen tot Sint Jans's Nativity at Night depicts the infant Jesus who "radiated such an ineffable light and splendour, that the sun was not comparable to it, nor did the candle that St. Joseph had put there, give any light at all, the divine light totally annihilating the material light of the candle." Strengthening the message about the baby Jesus being the light source, Geertgen depicts the child as the only source of illumination for the main scene inside the stable. Aglow are the faces of the angels, St Joseph and Virgin Mary. Although the shepherds' fire on the hill behind and the angel outside the window create a light source, it's dim in comparison to that provided by the infant child. The sharp contrast of the divine light against dark is a tool used to make the scene appear more profound for its viewers. London's National Gallery describes Geertgen's work as: "one of the most engaging and convincing early treatments of the Nativity as a night scene.

==== Annunciation to the Shepherds ====
In Annunciation to the Shepherds, the only source of light, in the still of the night, comes from an angel who has come to tell the shepherds of the birth of the infant Christ. The light is so brilliant that the Bethlehem shepherds must shield their eyes. Aside from the startling angel, the nocturnal painting is a still pastoral scene with a group of angels in the distance.

=== 16th century ===
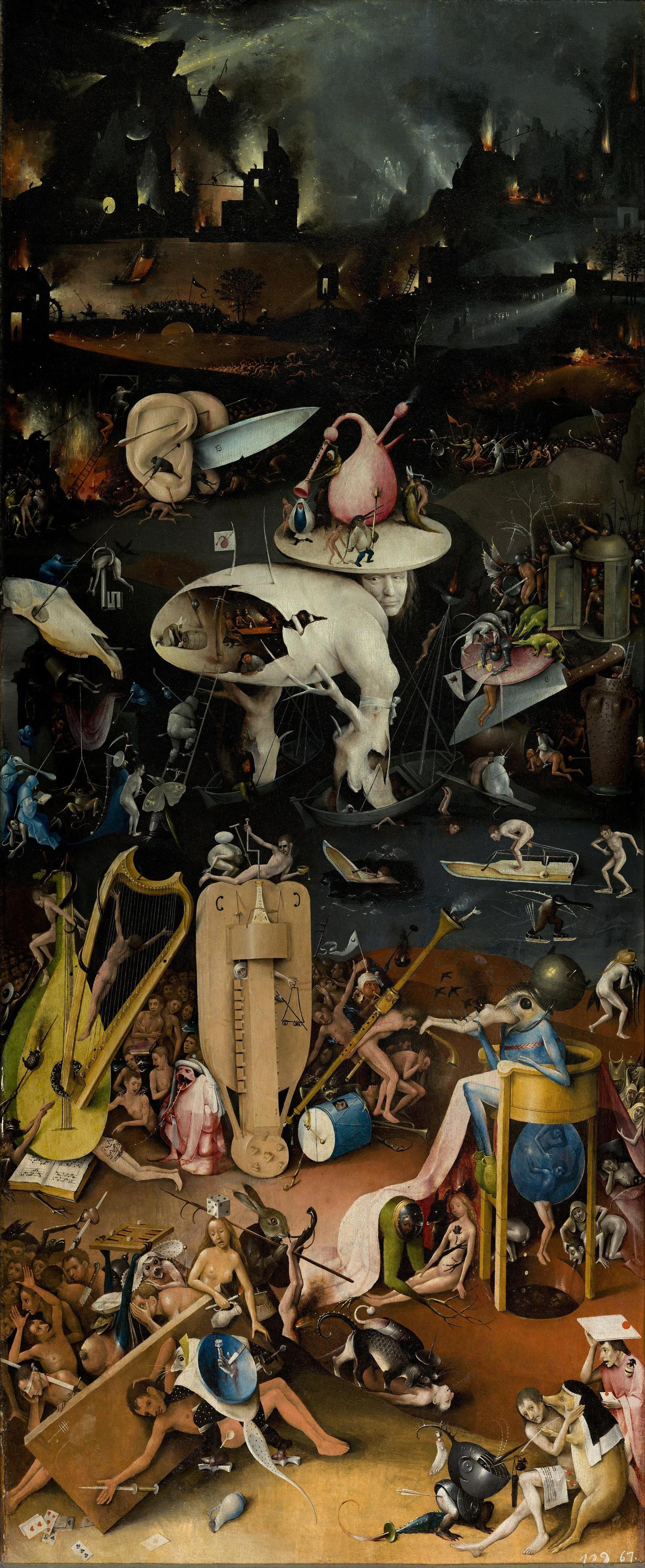
Hieronymus Bosch, The Garden of Earthly Delights, third panel, Hell, c. 1490–1510

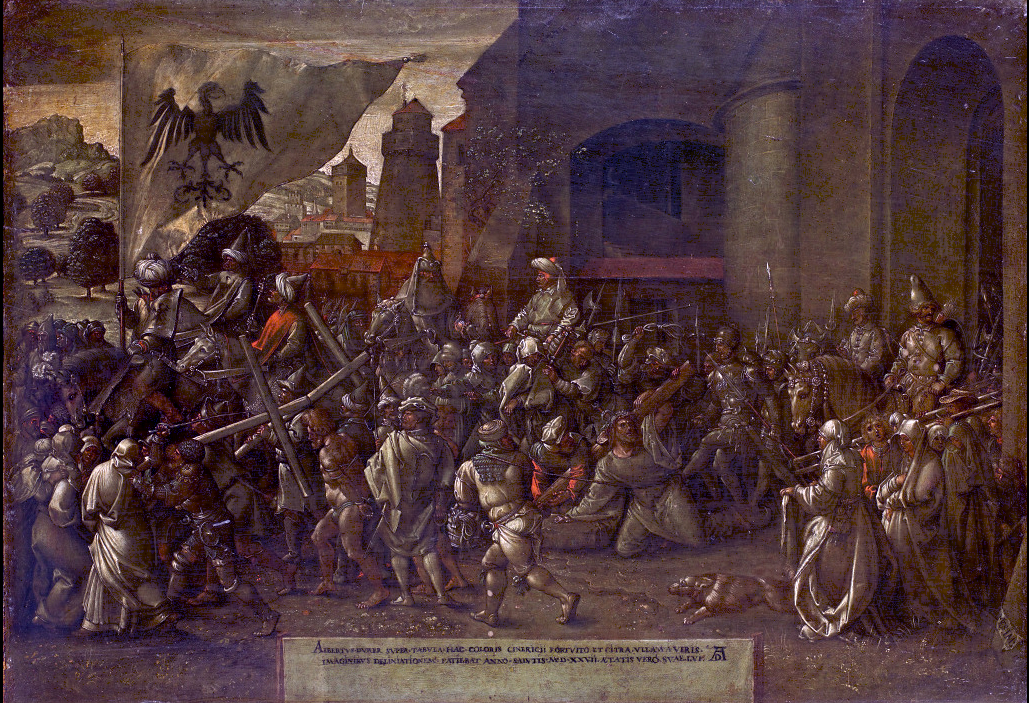
Albrecht Dürer, Way to Calvary, 1527

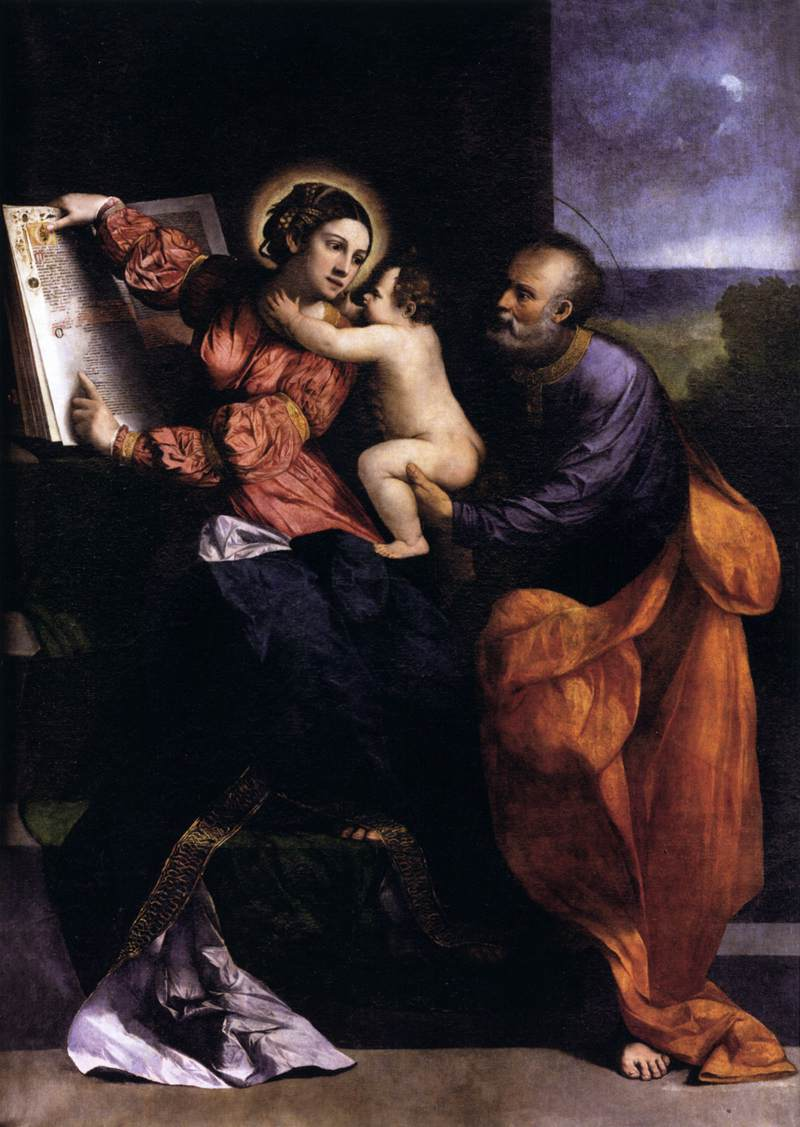
Dosso Dossi, The Holy Family, 1527–1528, Capitoline Museums, Rome

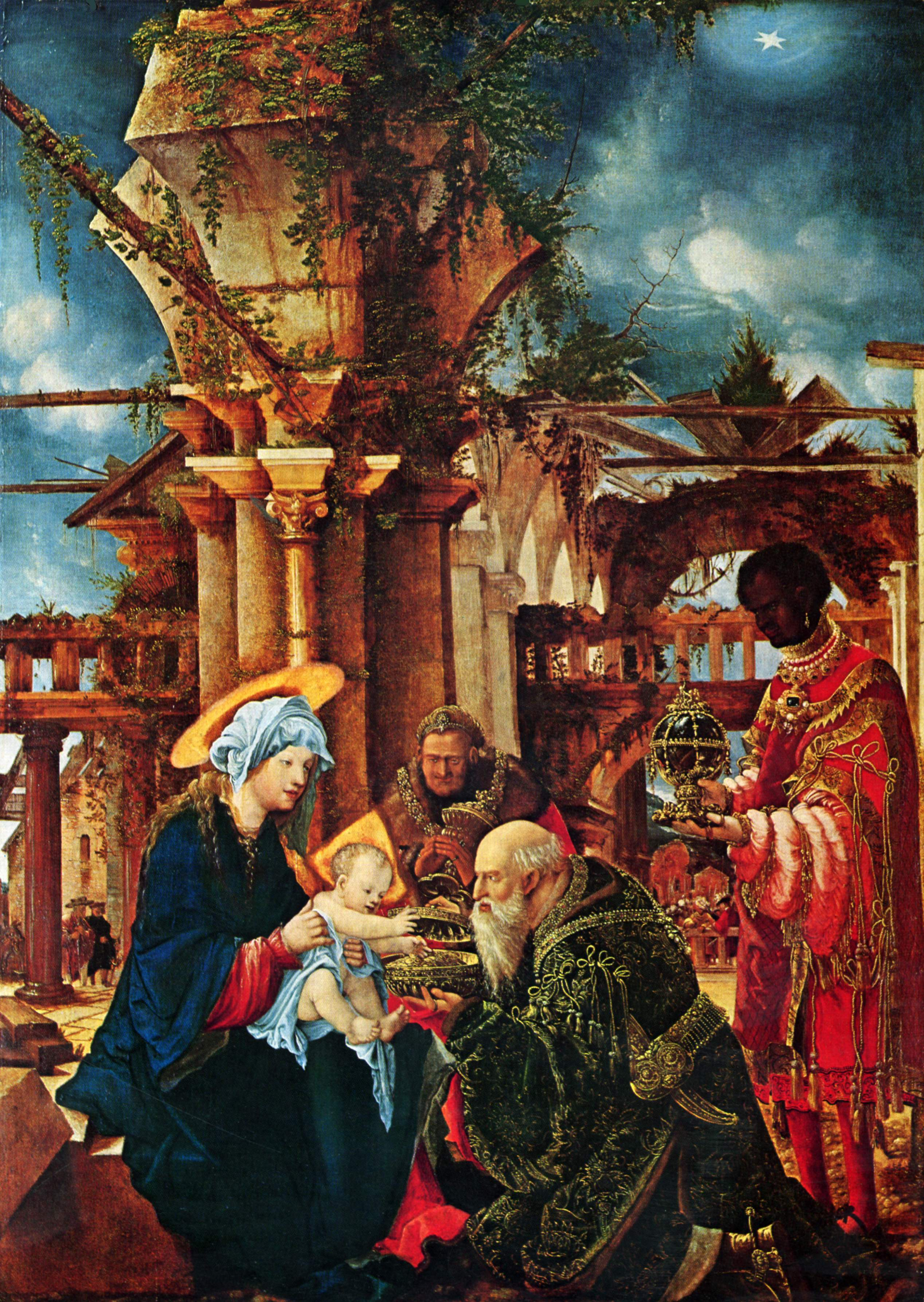
Albrecht Altdorfer, The Adoration of the Magi, c. 1530–1535, Städelsches Kunstinstitut, Frankfurt

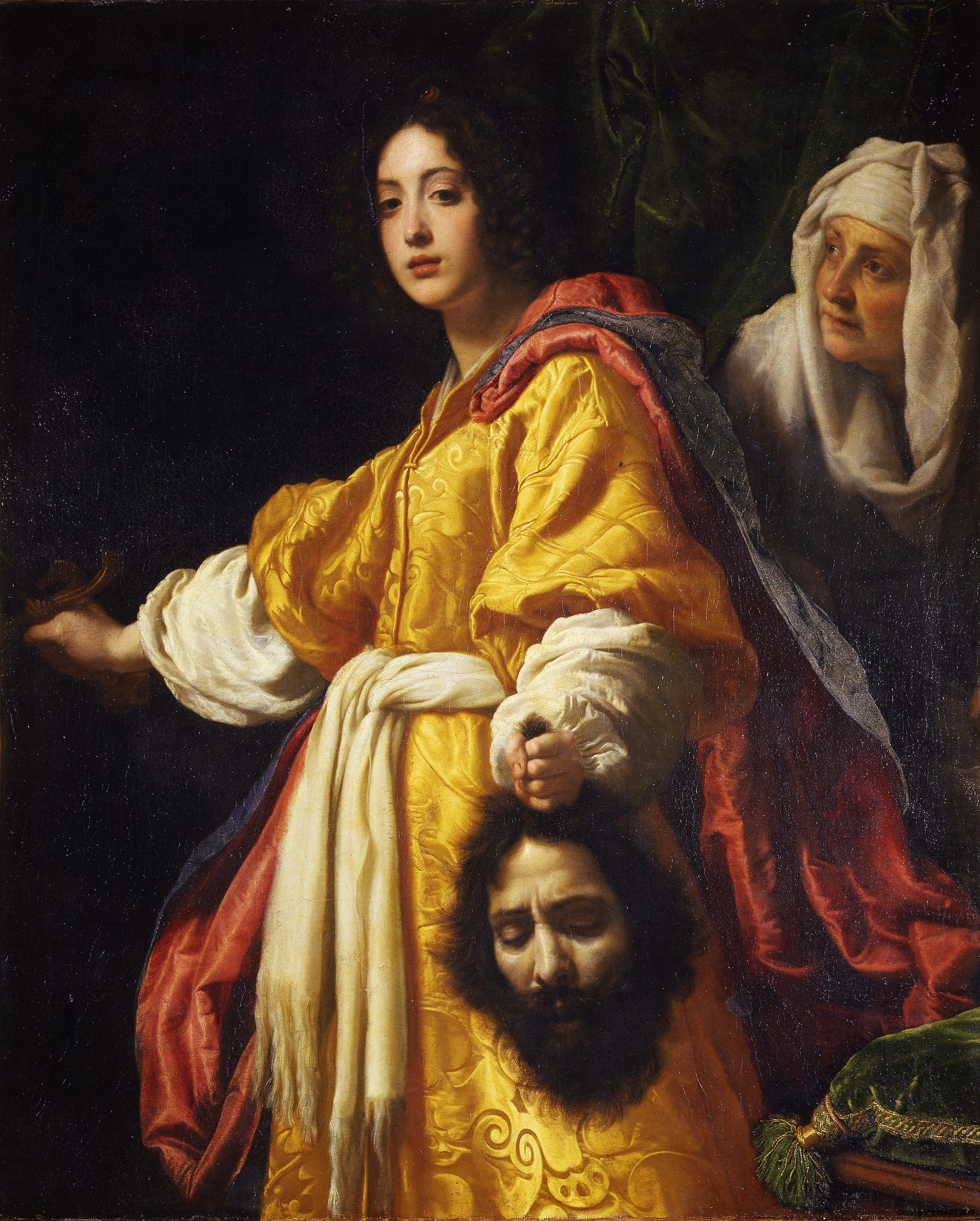
Cristofano Allori, Judith with the Head of Holophernes, c. 1580, Palazzo Pitti, Florence

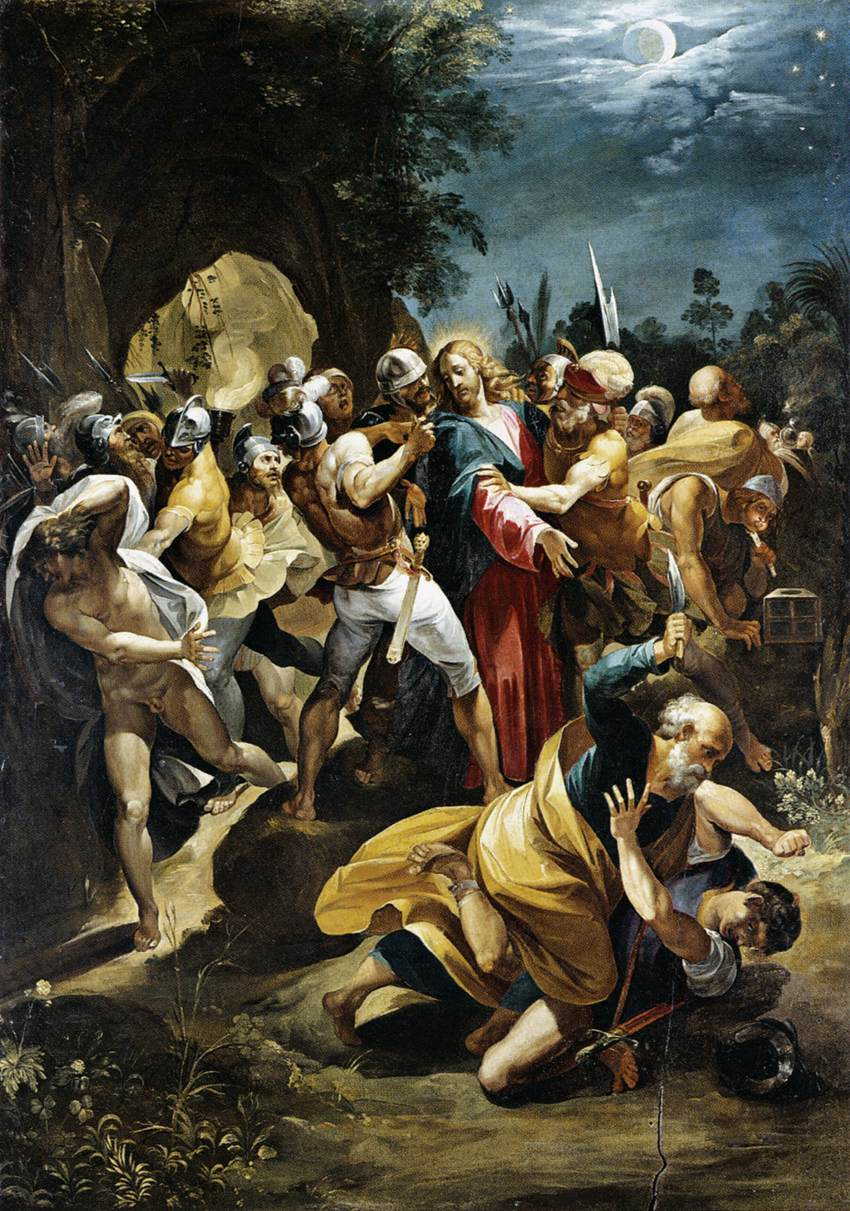
Giuseppe Cesari, Christ Taken Prisoner, c. 1597

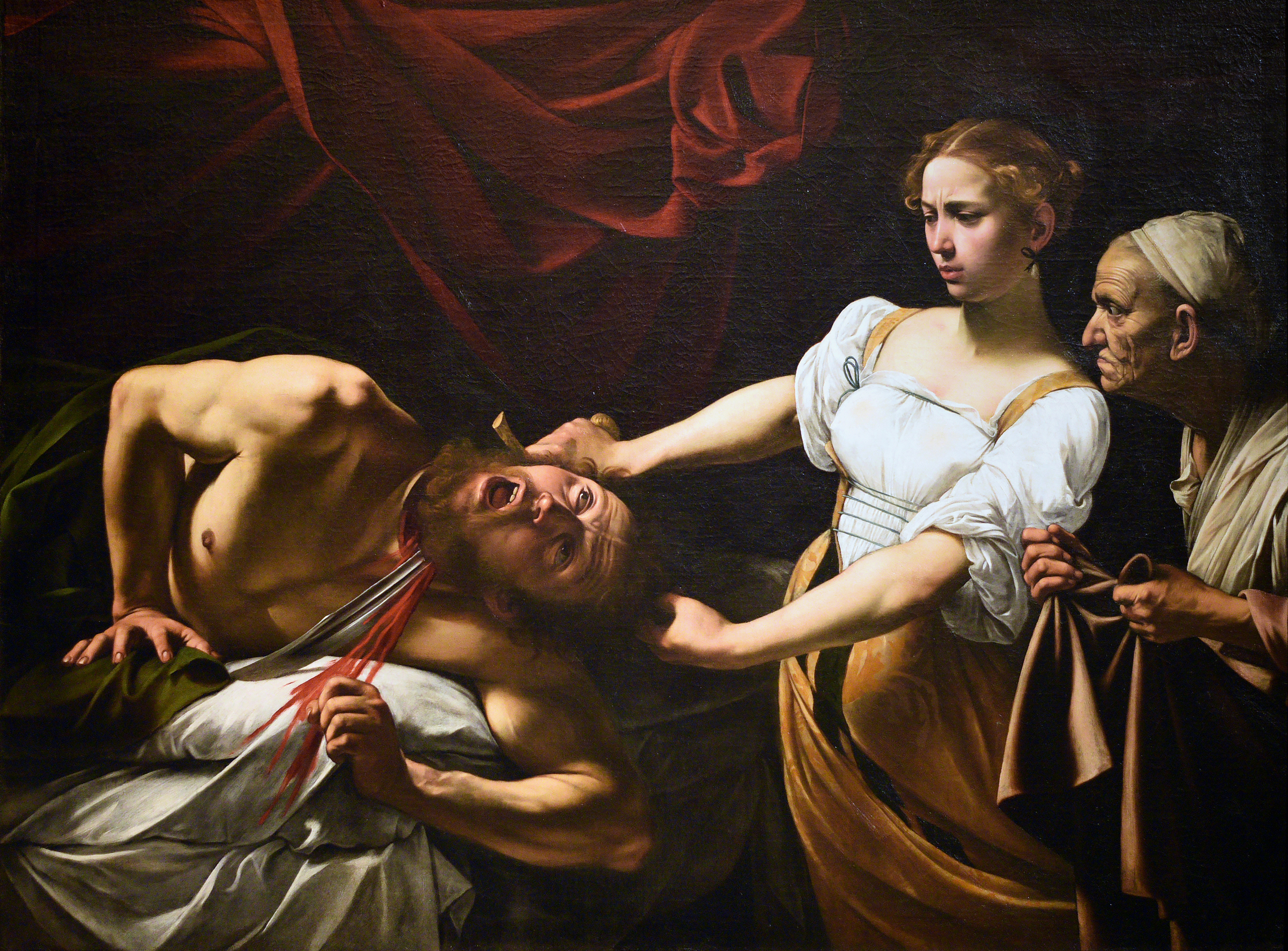
Michelangelo Merisi da Caravaggio, Judith Beheading Holofernes, c. 1598–1599, Galleria Nazionale d'Arte Antica, Rome

==== Dosso Dossi ====
Dosso Dossi (c. 1490 – 1542) (Note: The 2003 Columbia Encyclopedia cites birthdate as c. 1479. The Getty Museum (which owns some of Dossi's works), Britannica, Encarta, and the monograph below cite birthdate as c. 1490.), was an Italian Renaissance painter who belonged to the Ferrara School of Painting.

==== Albrecht Altdorfer ====
Albrecht Altdorfer (c. 1480 – 12 February 1538) was a German painter, engraver and architect of the Renaissance of the so-called Danube School setting biblical and historical subjects against landscape backgrounds of expressive colours.

==== Giuseppe Cesari ====
Giuseppe Cesari (c. 1568 – 3 July 1640) was an Italian Mannerist painter and instructor to Caravaggio.

=== 17th century ===
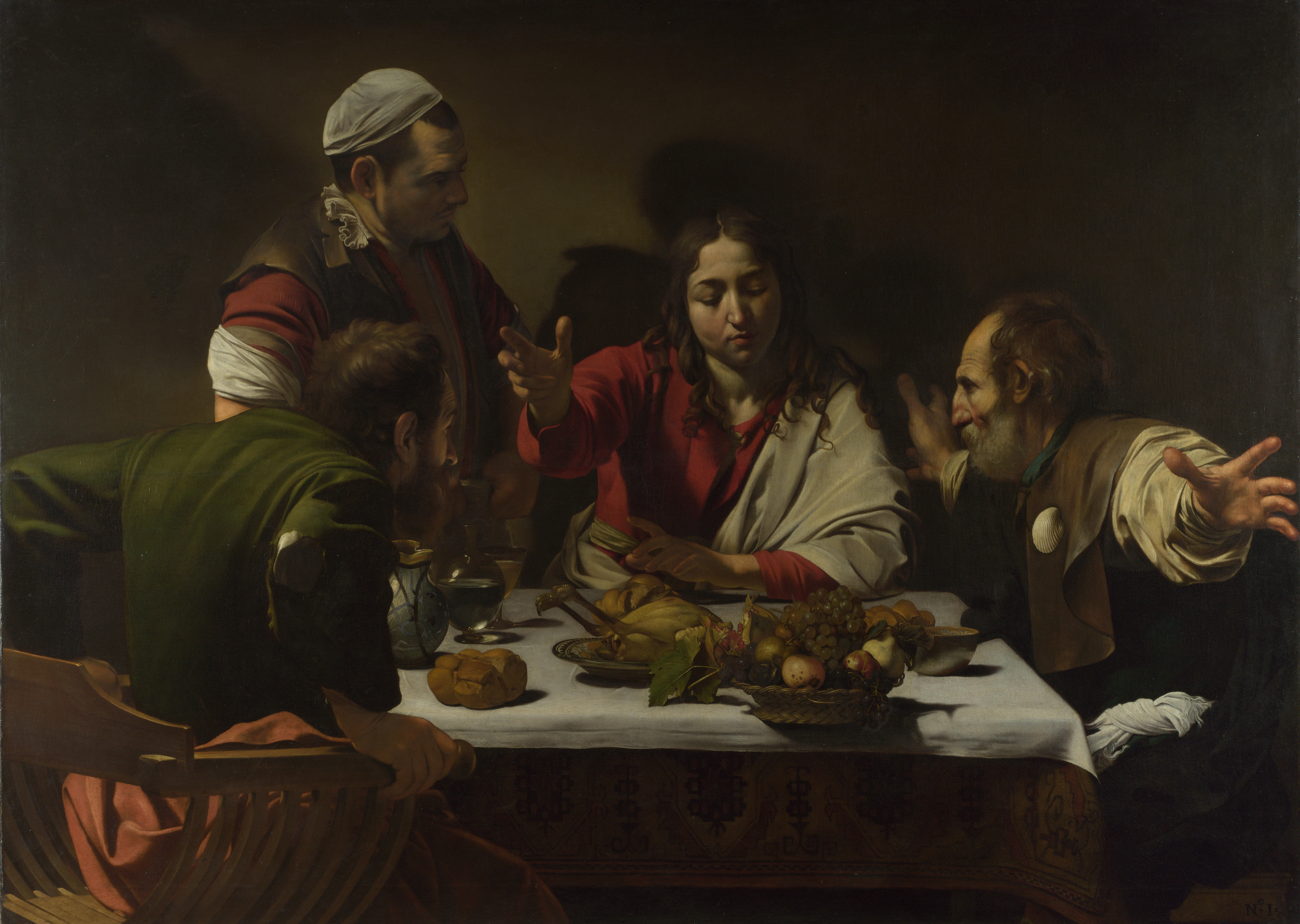
Michelangelo Merisi da Caravaggio, Supper at Emmaus, 1601, National Gallery, London

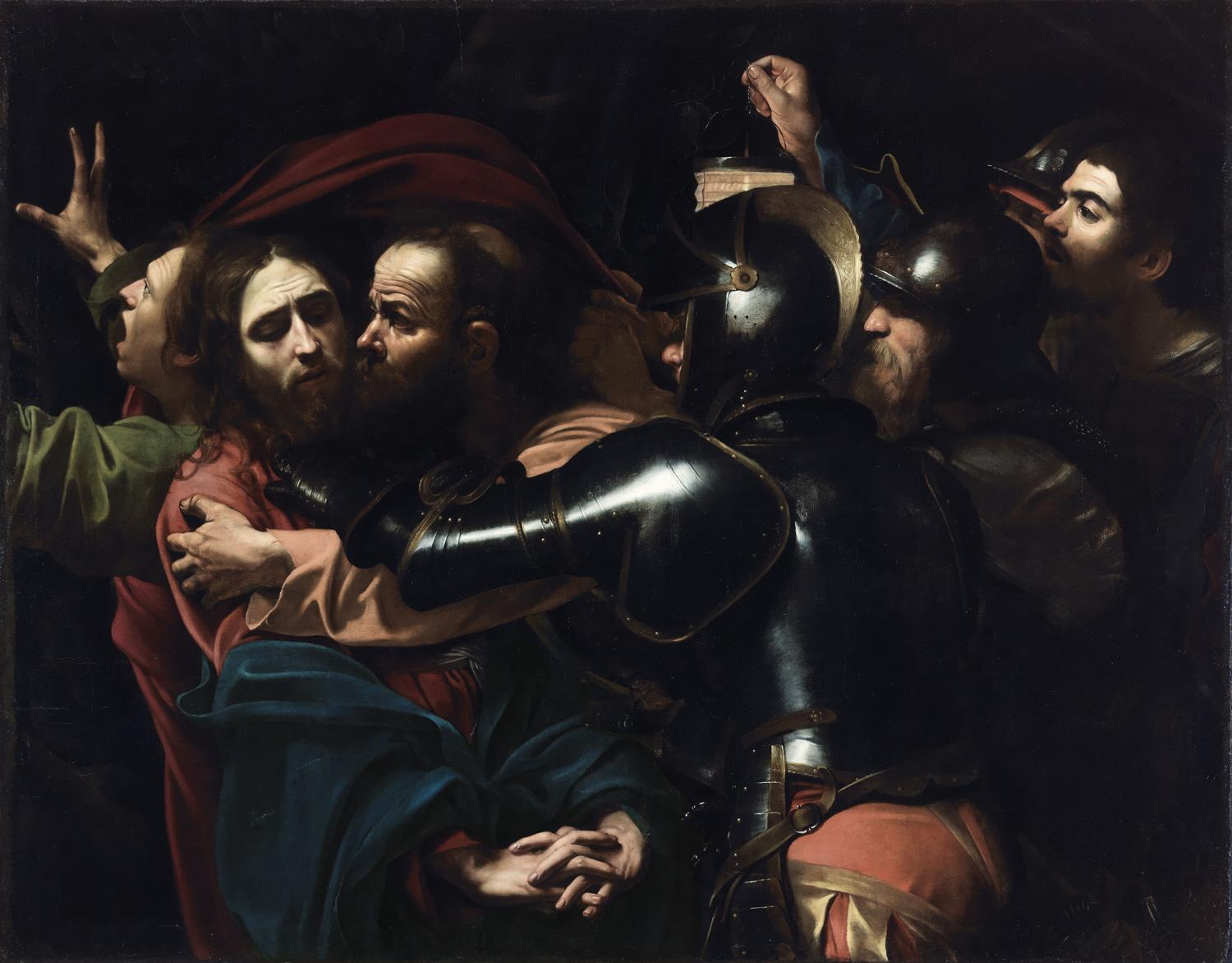
Michelangelo Merisi da Caravaggio, The Taking of Christ, c. 1602, National Gallery of Ireland, Dublin

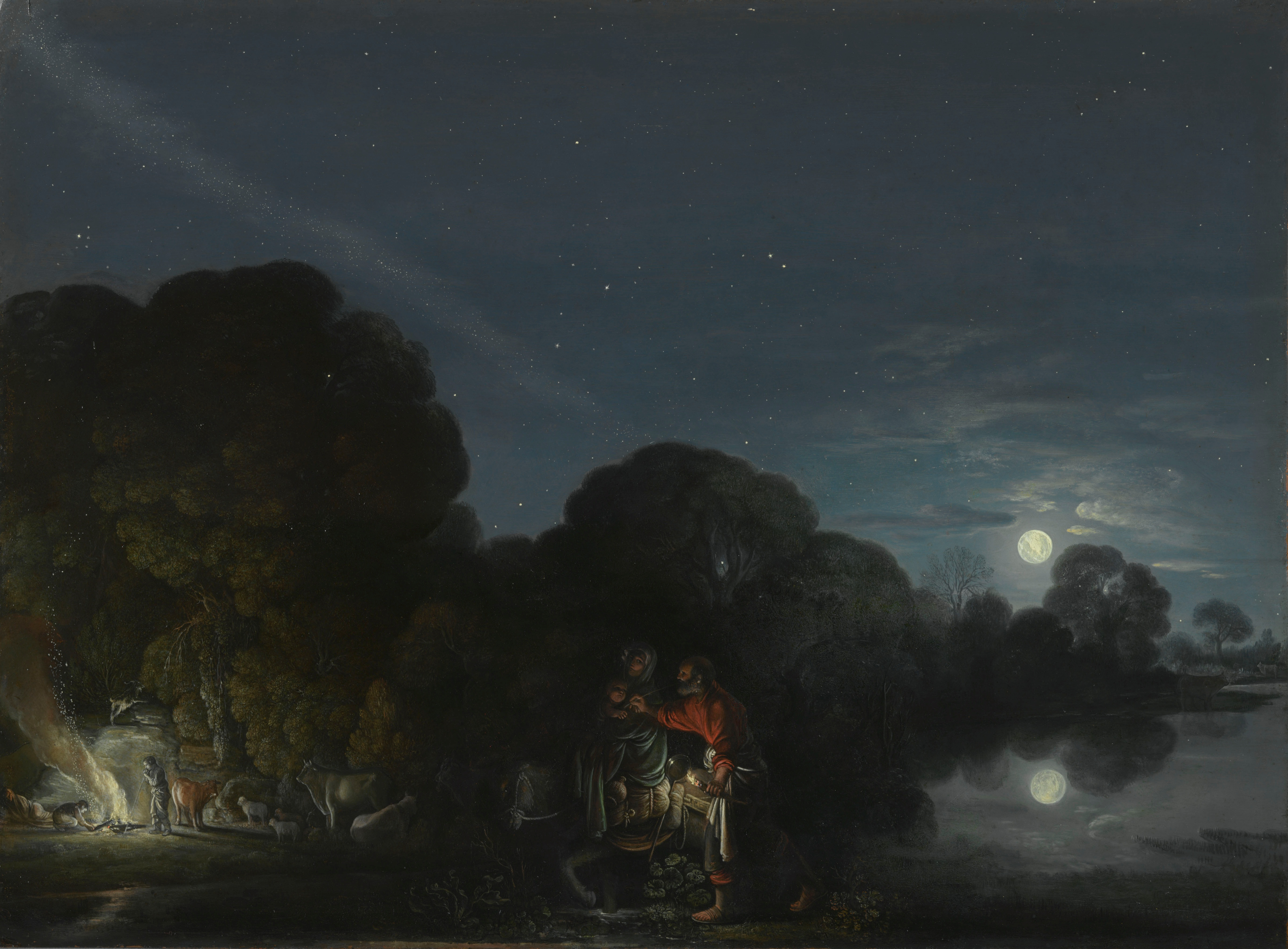
Adam Elsheimer, The Flight into Egypt c. 1609

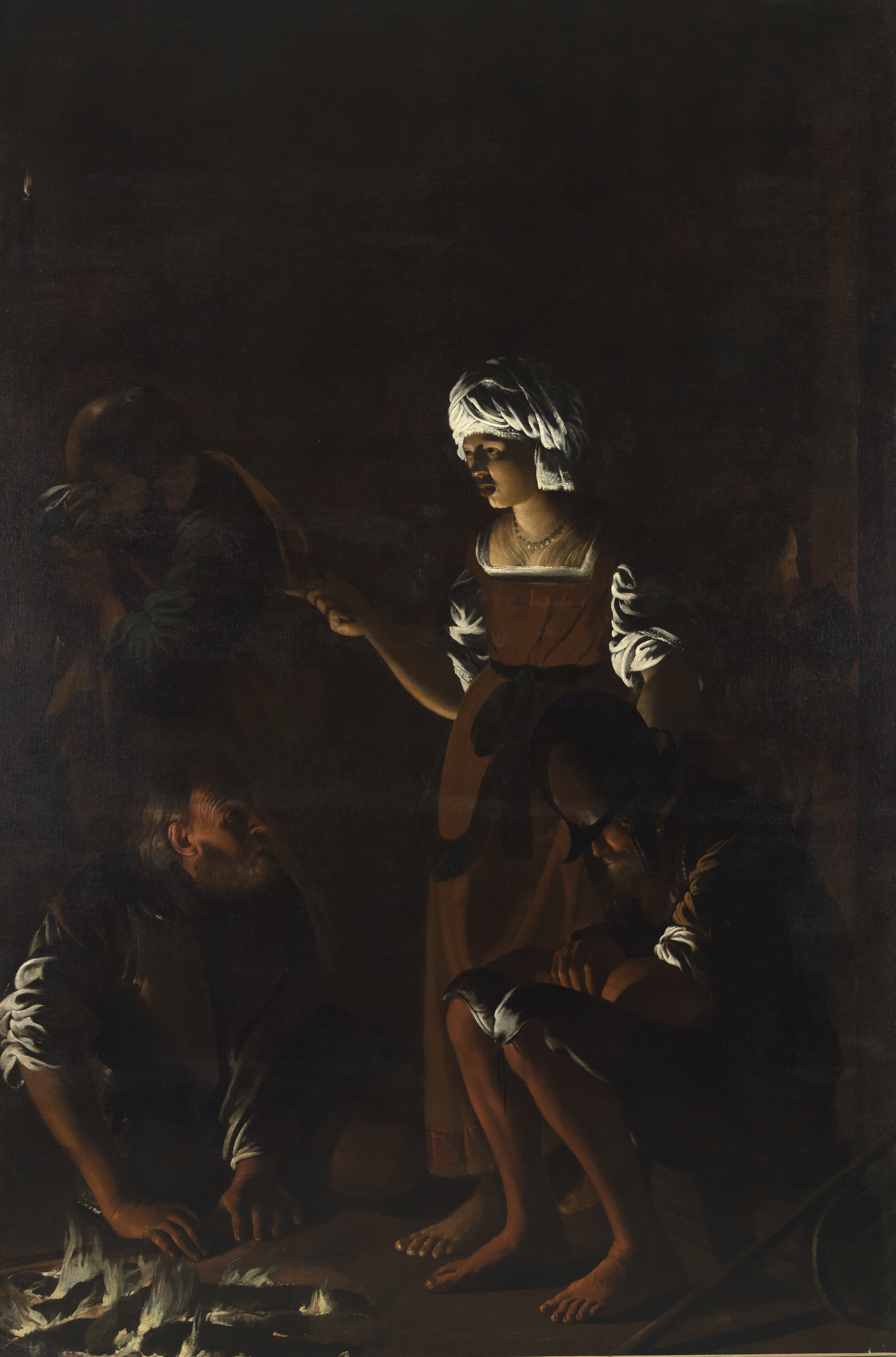
Hendrick ter Brugghen, The Denial of Saint Peter, c. 1607–1613

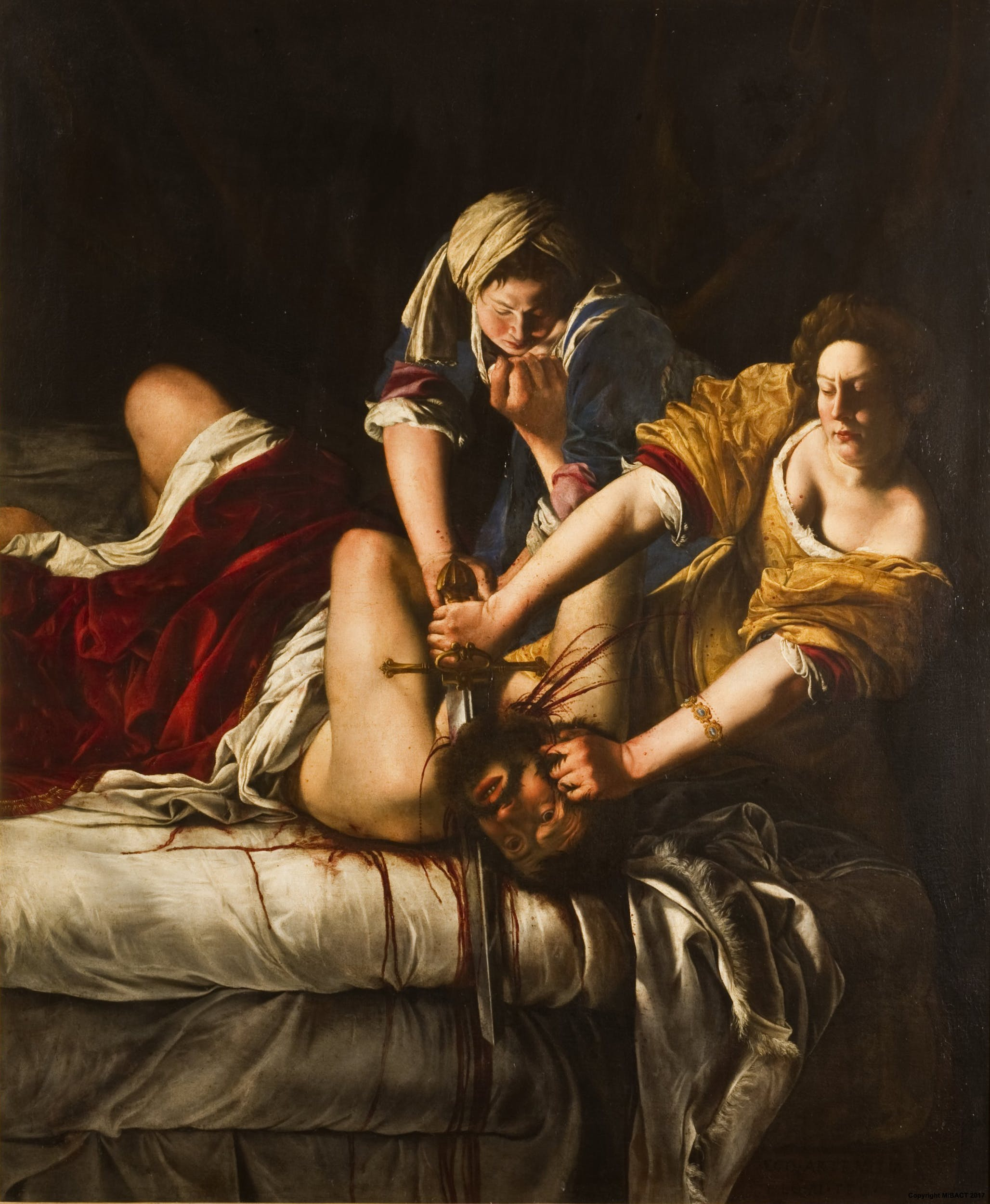
Artemisia Gentileschi, Judith Beheading Holofernes, 1614–1620, Galleria degli Uffizi, Florence

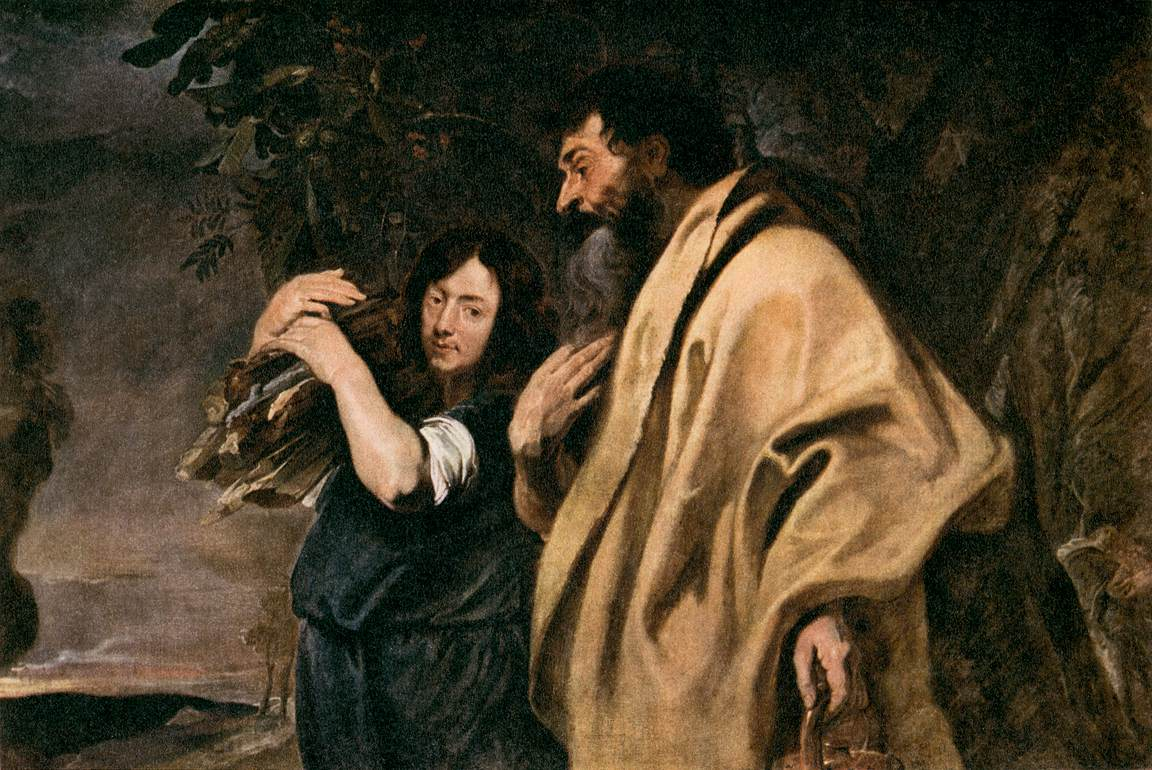
Anthony van Dyck, Abraham and Isaac, c. 1617, National Gallery, Prague

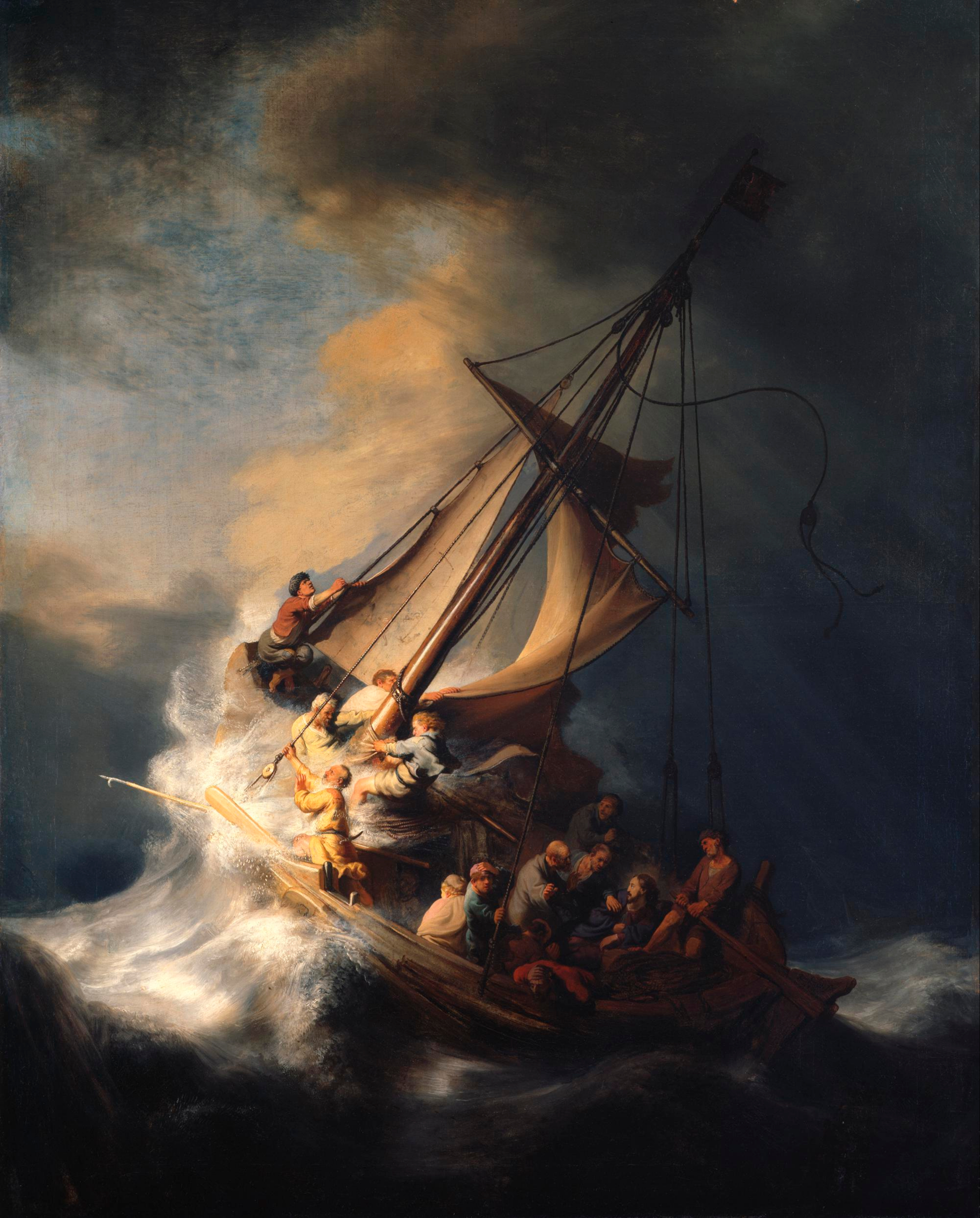
Rembrandt, The Storm on the Sea of Galilee, 1633. The painting is still missing after robbery from the Isabella Stewart Gardner Museum in 1990.

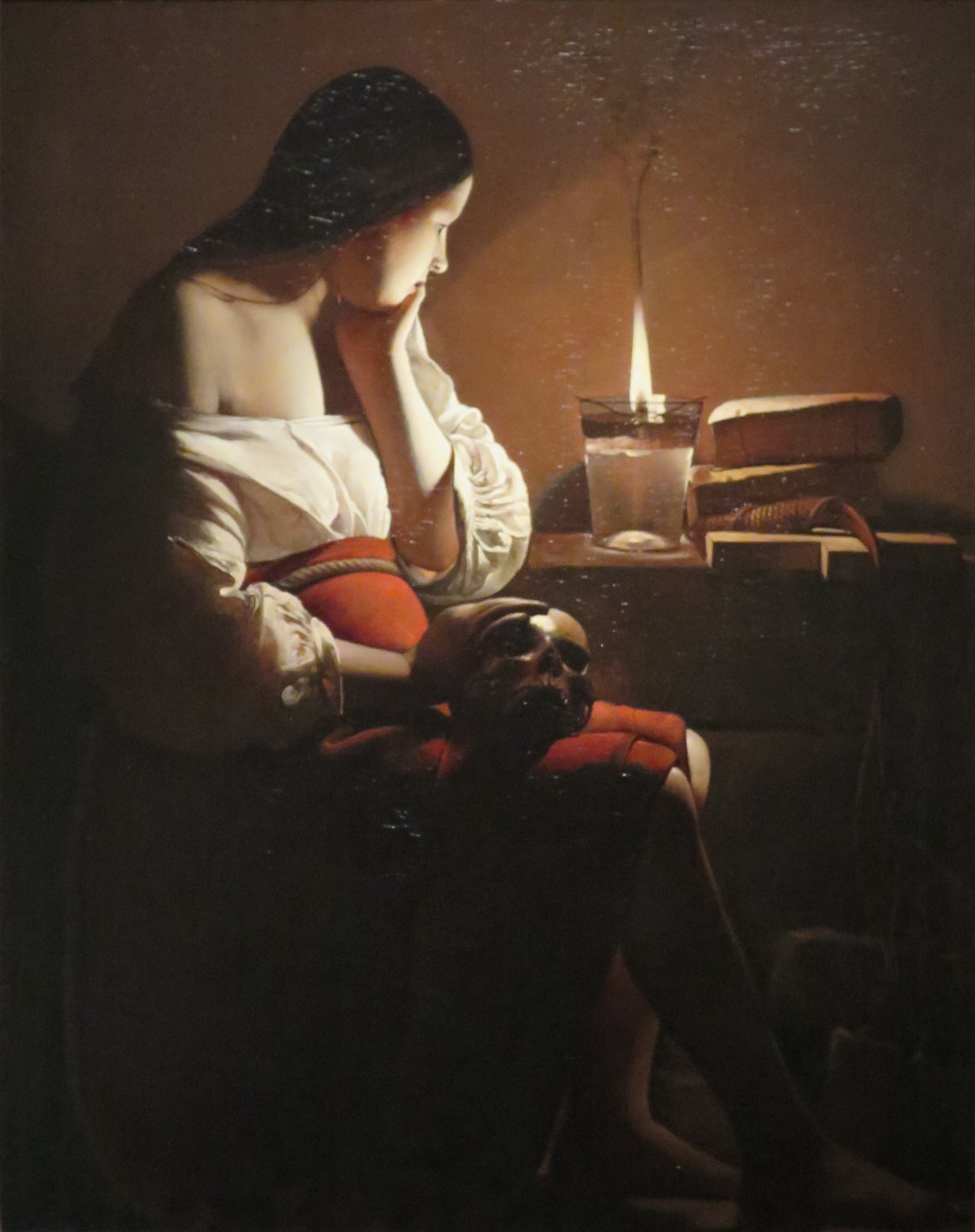
Georges de La Tour, Magdalene with the Smoking Flame, c. 1640, Los Angeles County Museum of Art

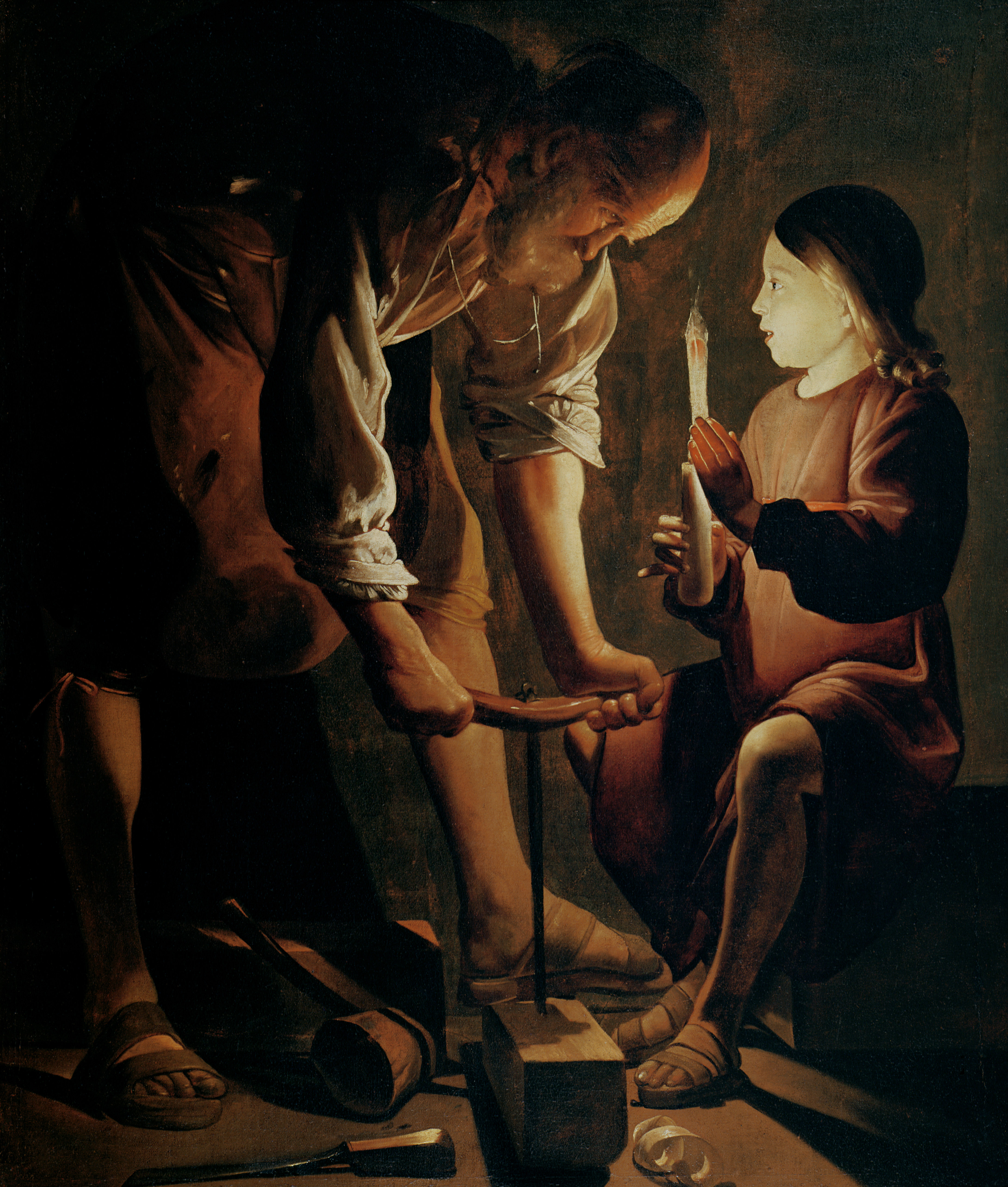
Georges de La Tour, Joseph the Carpenter, 1642, the Louvre

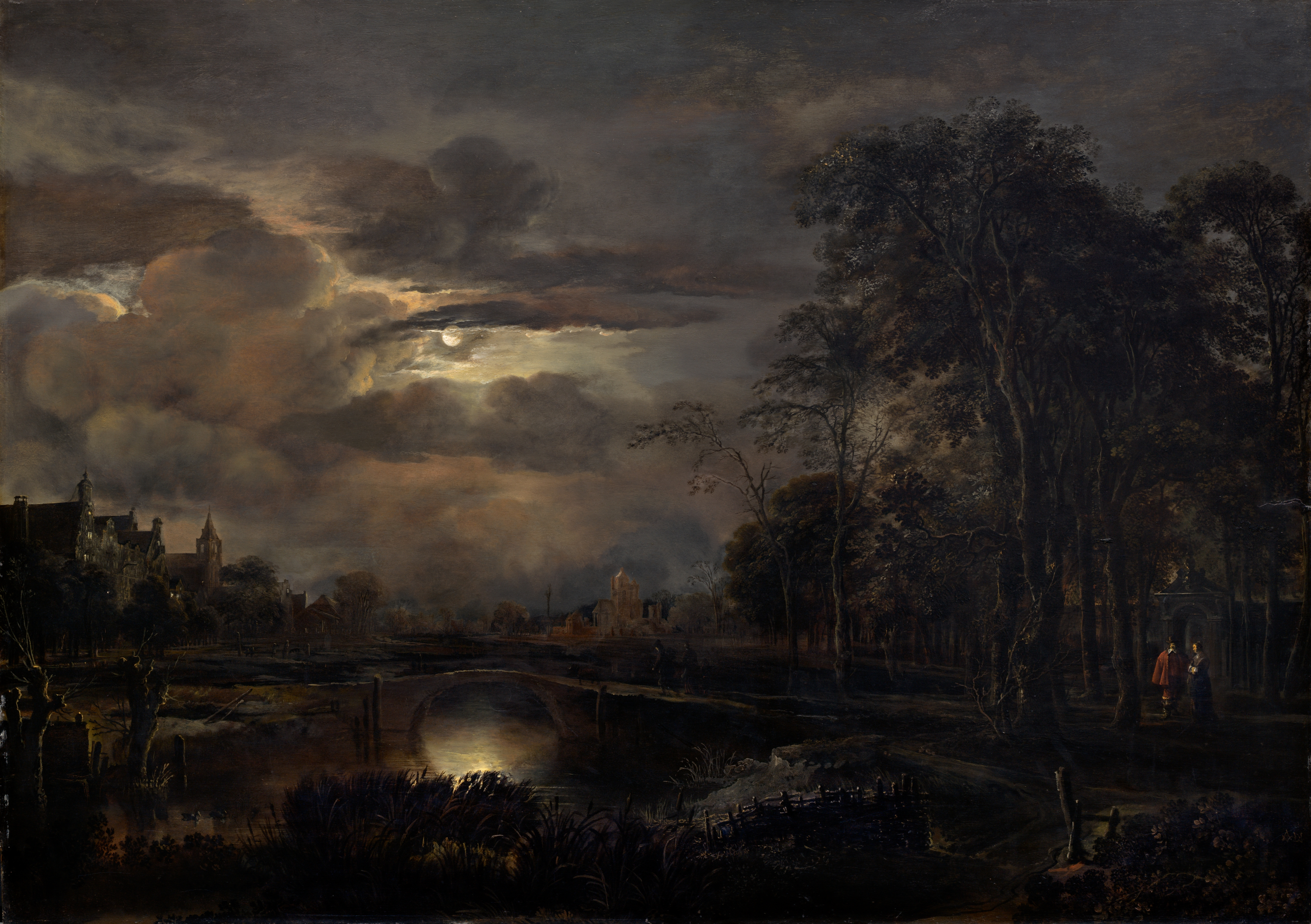
Aert van der Neer, Moonlit Landscape with Bridge, 1648–1650, National Gallery of Art, Washington D.C.

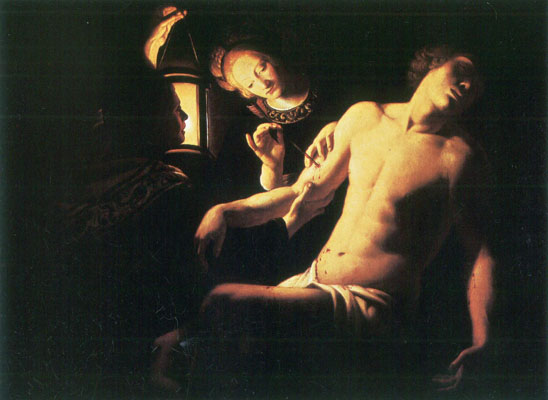
Trophime Bigot, St. Sebastian Aided by St. Irene, before 1650

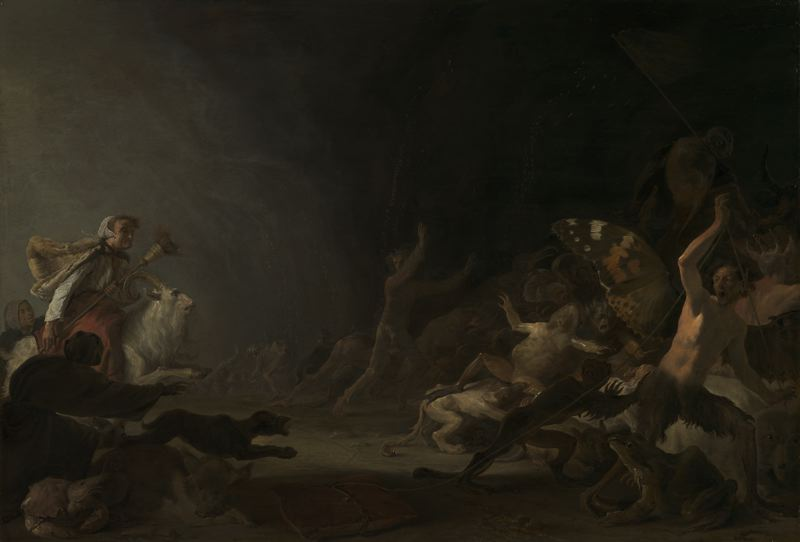
Cornelis Saftleven, A Witches' Sabbath, c. 1650, Chicago Art Institute

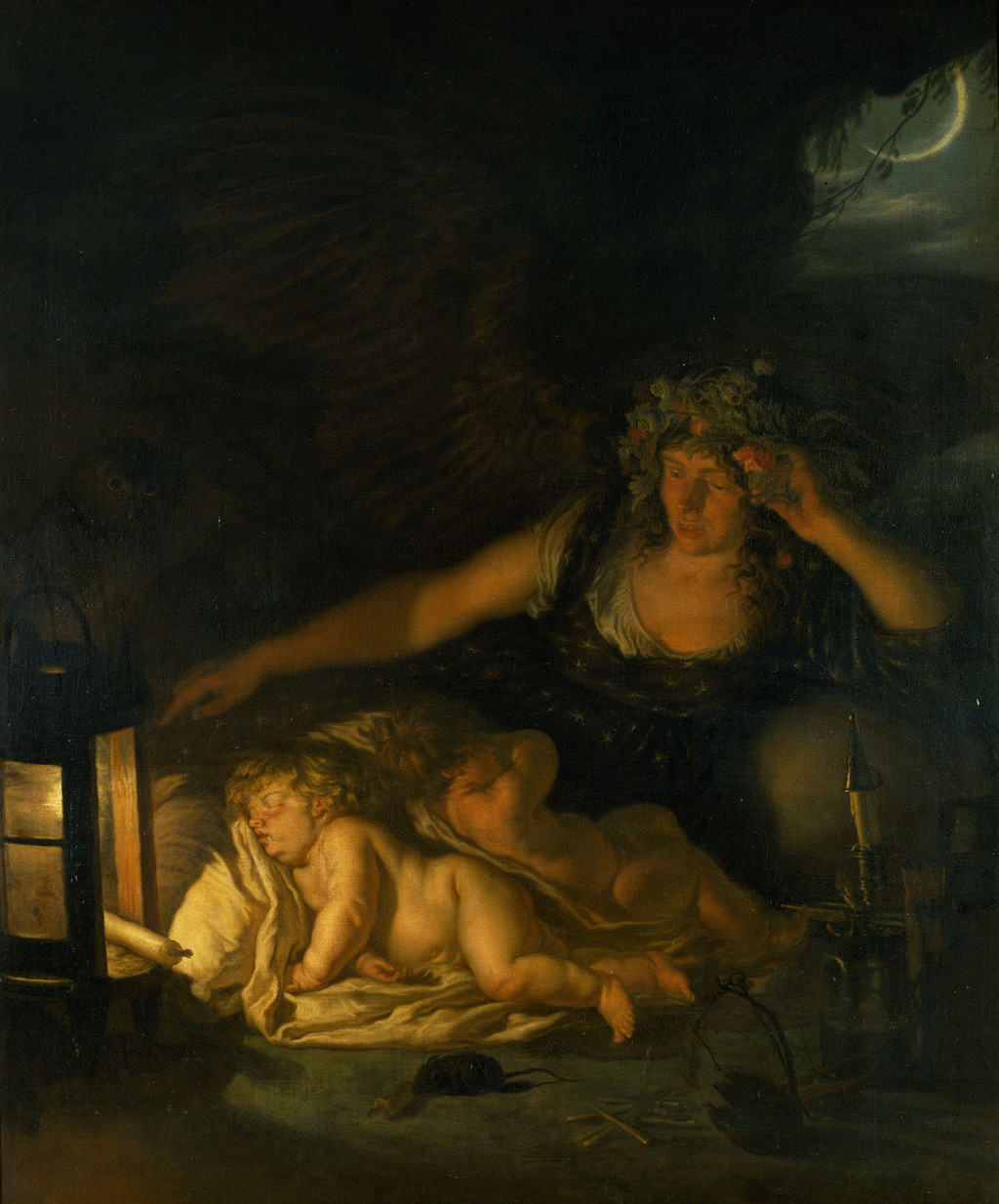
Joachim von Sandrart, Allegory of Night, 1654–1656

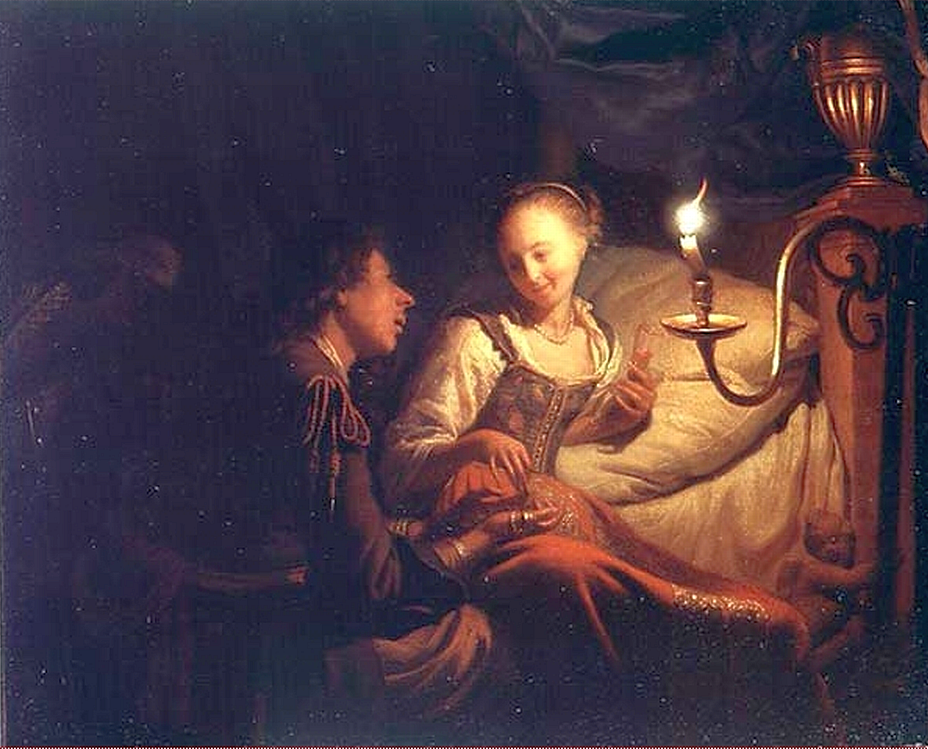
Godfried Schalcken, A Man Offering a Gold Chain and Coins to a Girl Seated on a Bed, c. 1665–1670

==== Adam Elsheimer ====
Early Baroque artist Adam Elsheimer created night scenes that were highly original. His works departed slightly from other works of the Baroque period were dramatic and abundantly detailed. Baroque paintings featured "exaggerated lighting, intense emotions, release from restraint, and even a kind of artistic sensationalism". Elsheimer's lighting effects in general were very subtle, and very different from those of Caravaggio. He often uses as many as five different sources of light, and graduates the light relatively gently, with the less well-lit parts of the composition often containing important parts of it.

==== Michelangelo Merisi da Caravaggio ====
Michelangelo Merisi da Caravaggio was an Italian artist active between 1593 and 1610. His paintings, which combine a realistic observation of the human state, both physical and emotional, with a dramatic use of lighting, had a formative influence on the Baroque school of painting. Caravaggio's novelty was a radical naturalism that combined close physical observation with a dramatic, even theatrical, use of chiaroscuro. This came to be known as Tenebrism, the shift from light to dark with little intermediate value.

==== Georges de La Tour ====
Georges de La Tour was a French Baroque painter who painted mostly religious chiaroscuro scenes lit by candlelight, which were more developed than his artistic predecessors, yet lacked dramatic effects of Caravaggio. He created some of the most arresting works in this genre, portraying a wide range of scenes by candlelight from card games to New Testament narratives.

==== Aert van der Neer ====
The Dutch Golden Age painter Aert van der Neer was a landscape painter, specializing in small night scenes lit only by moonlight and fires, and snowy winter landscapes, both often looking down a canal or river.

==== Anthony van Dyck ====
Anthony van Dyck (22 March 1599 – 9 December 1641) was a Flemish Baroque artist and leading court painter in England.

==== Rembrandt ====
In northern Europe, Dutch Golden Age painting produced some nocturnes, though Rembrandt's (1606–1669) only real work in the genre is his Rest on the Flight into Egypt (1647, National Gallery of Ireland), which is set within a nocturnal landscape. His large group portrait, The Militia Company of Captain Frans Banning Cocq (1642), is popularly known as The Night Watch, although it is not a night scene.

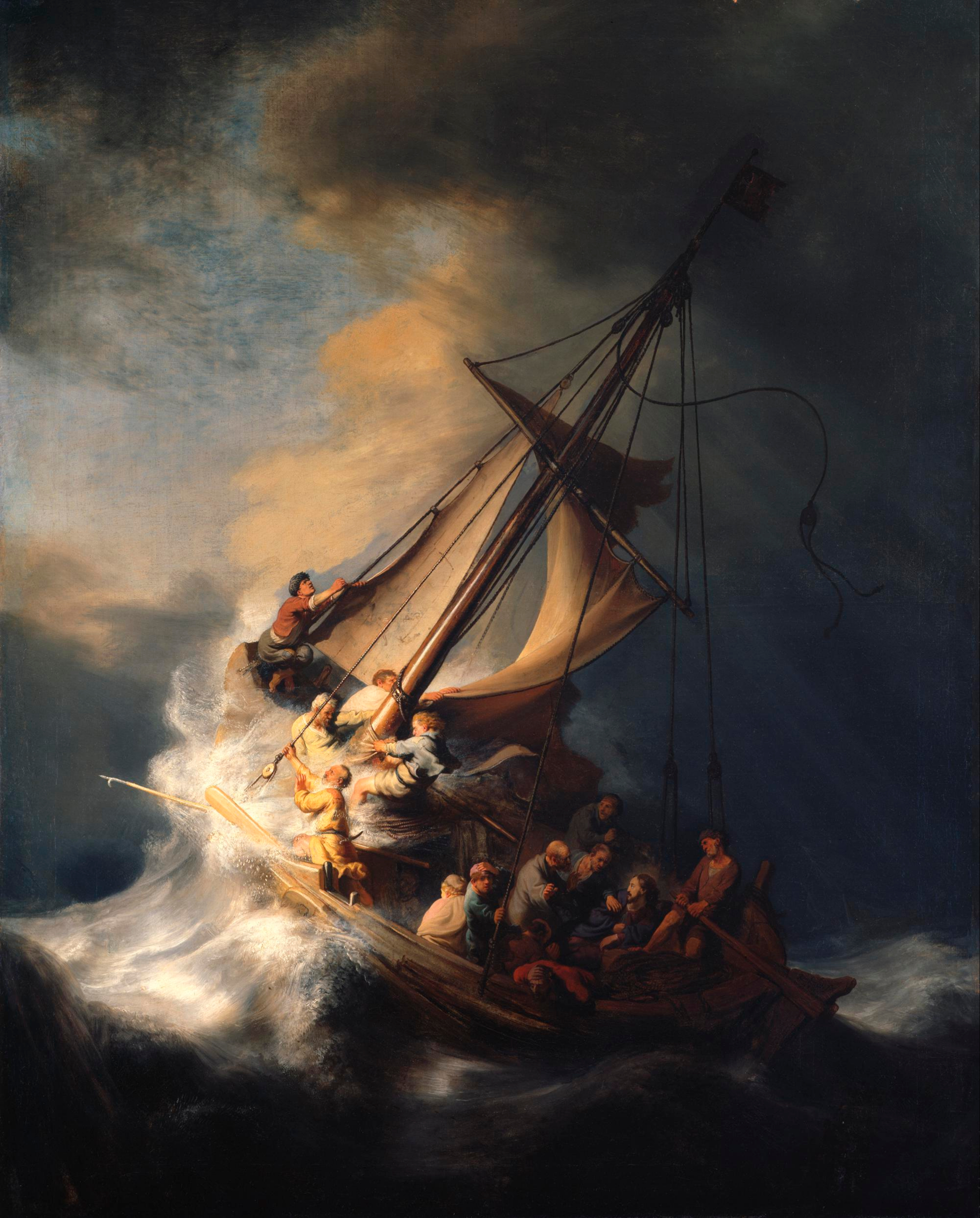
The Storm on the Sea of Galilee, 1633, a dark sea storm

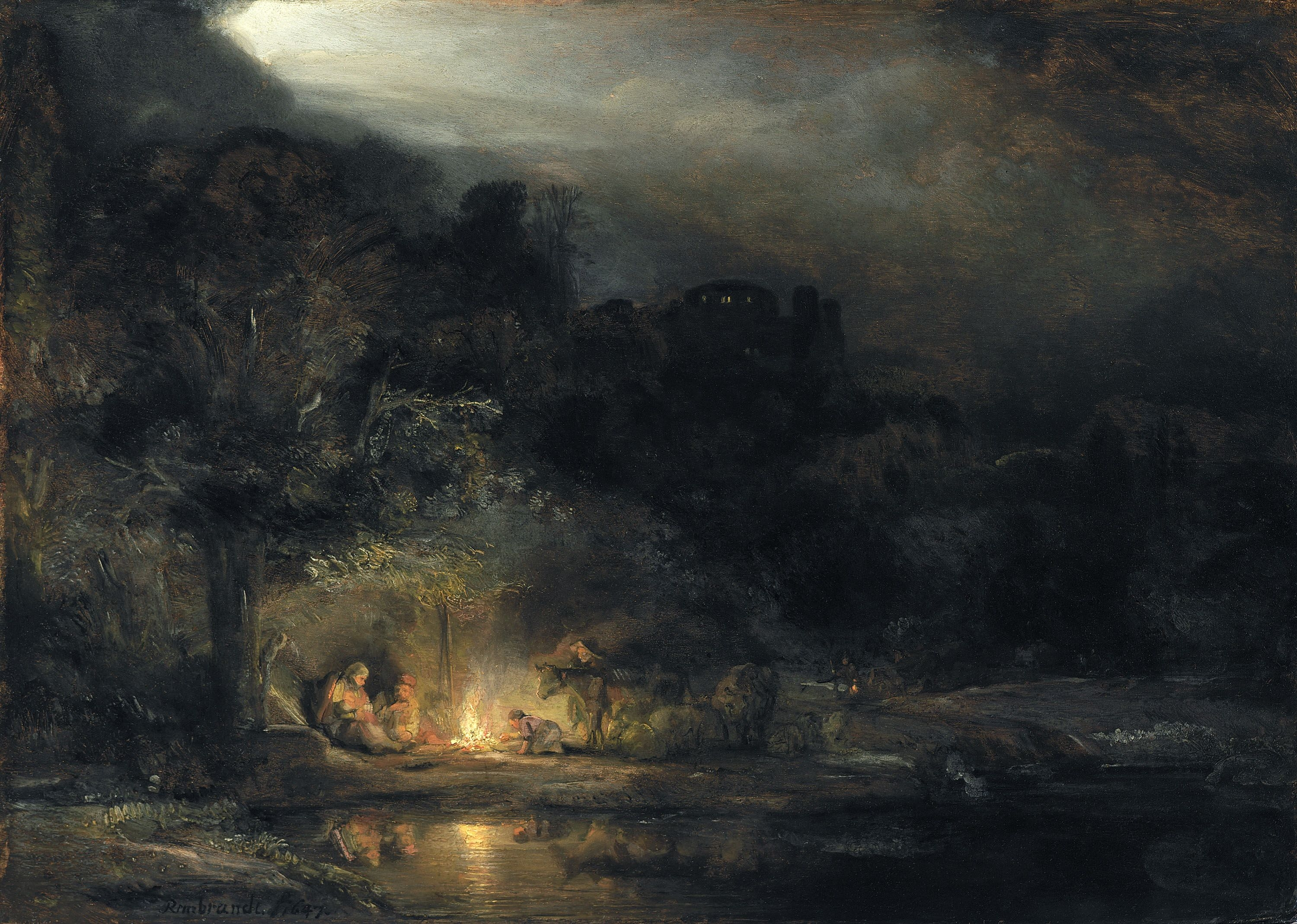
Rest on the Flight into Egypt, 1647

Christ and the Woman of Samaria, 1659

The Night Watch or The Militia Company of Captain Frans Banning Cocq, 1642, Rijksmuseum, Amsterdam

=== 18th century ===
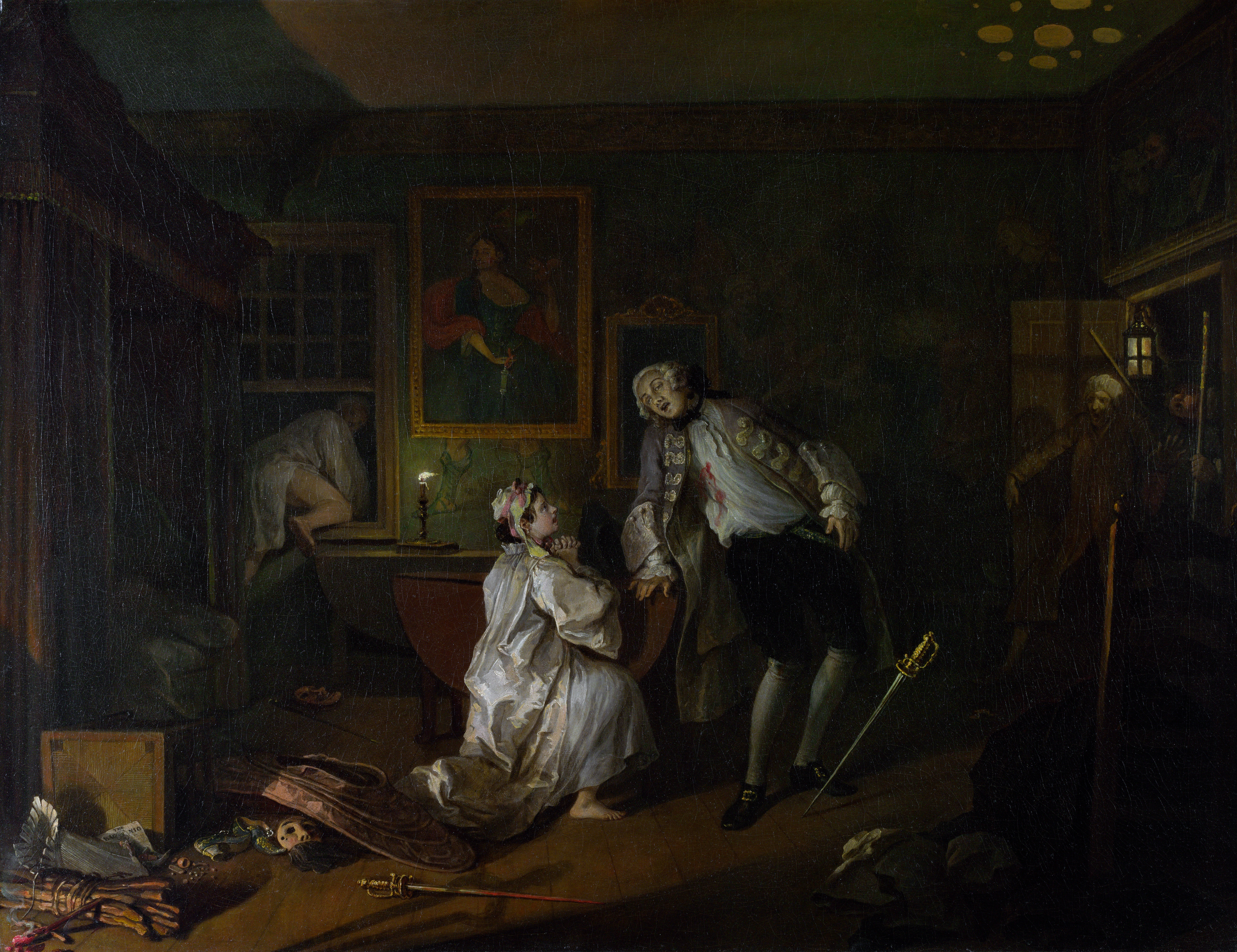
William Hogarth, Marriage A-la-Mode: 5. The Bagnio, c. 1743

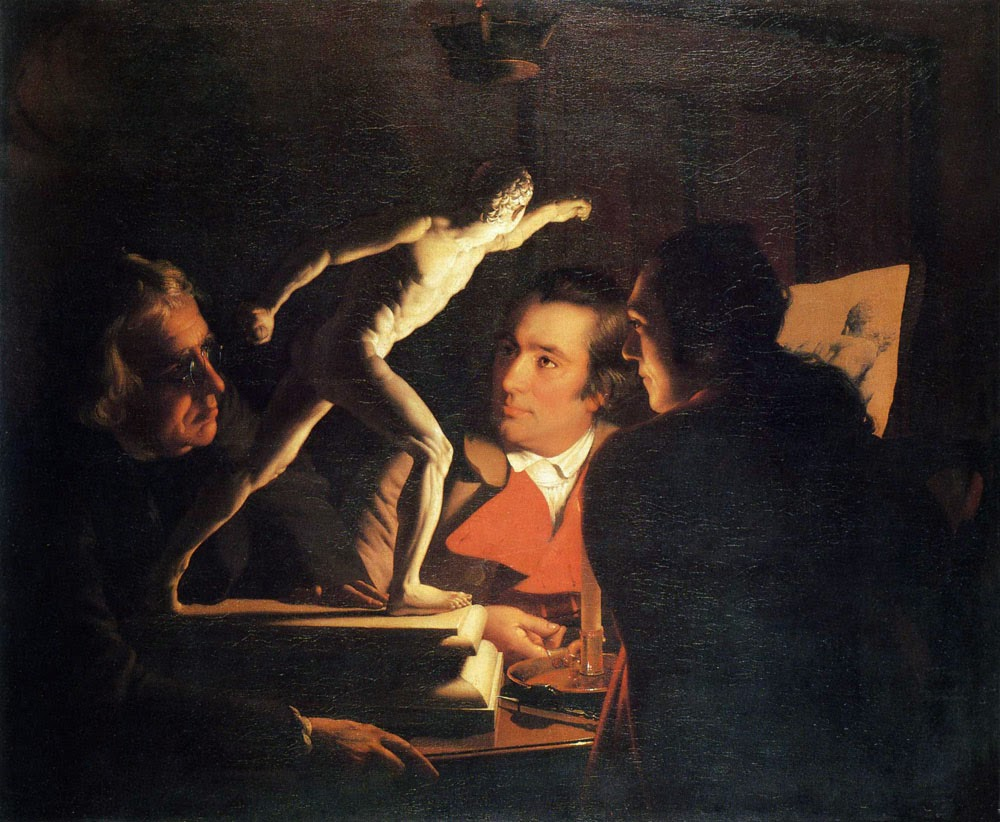
Joseph Wright of Derby, Three Persons Viewing the Gladiator by Candlelight 1765

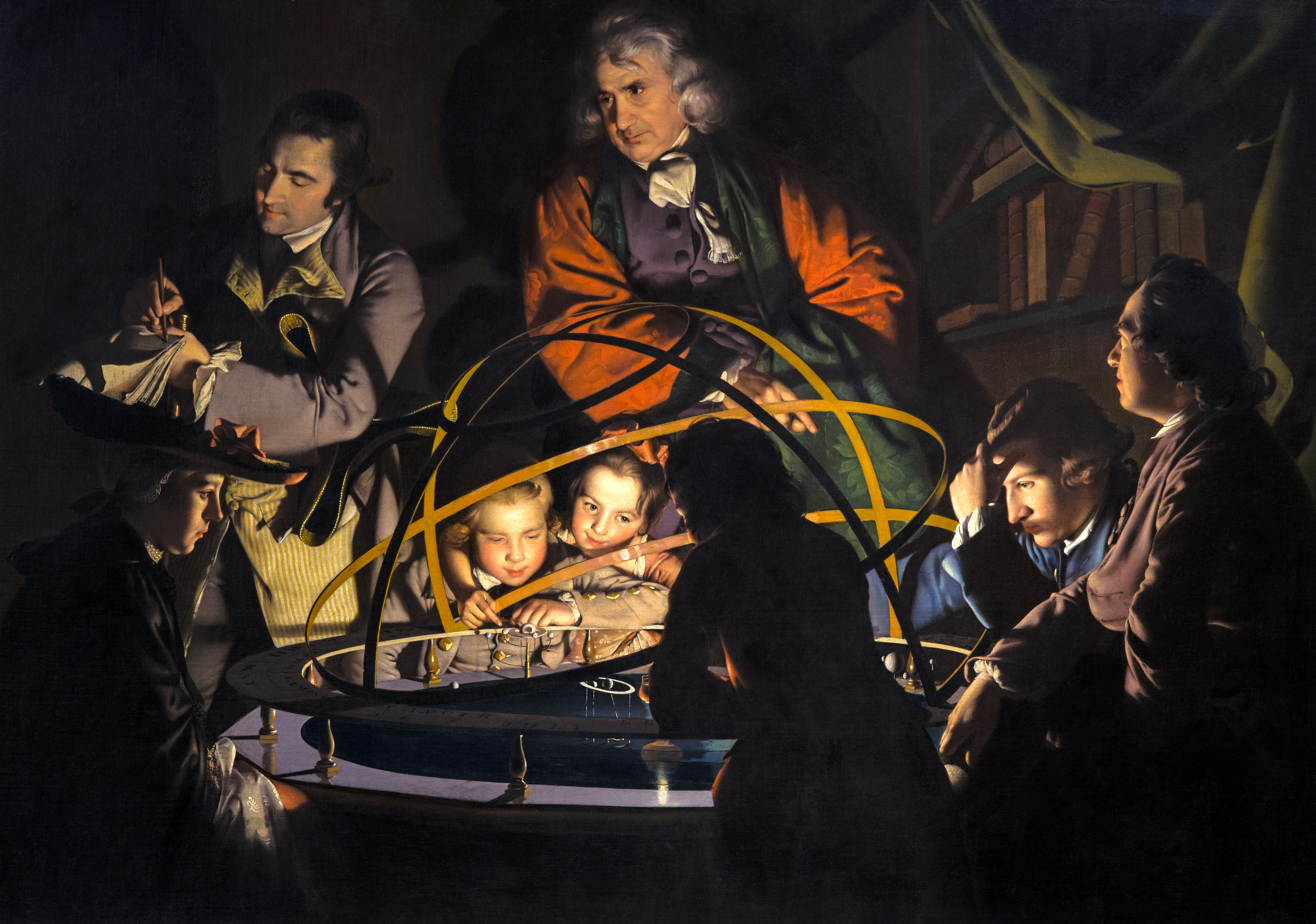
Joseph Wright of Derby, A Philosopher Lecturing on the Orrery 1766

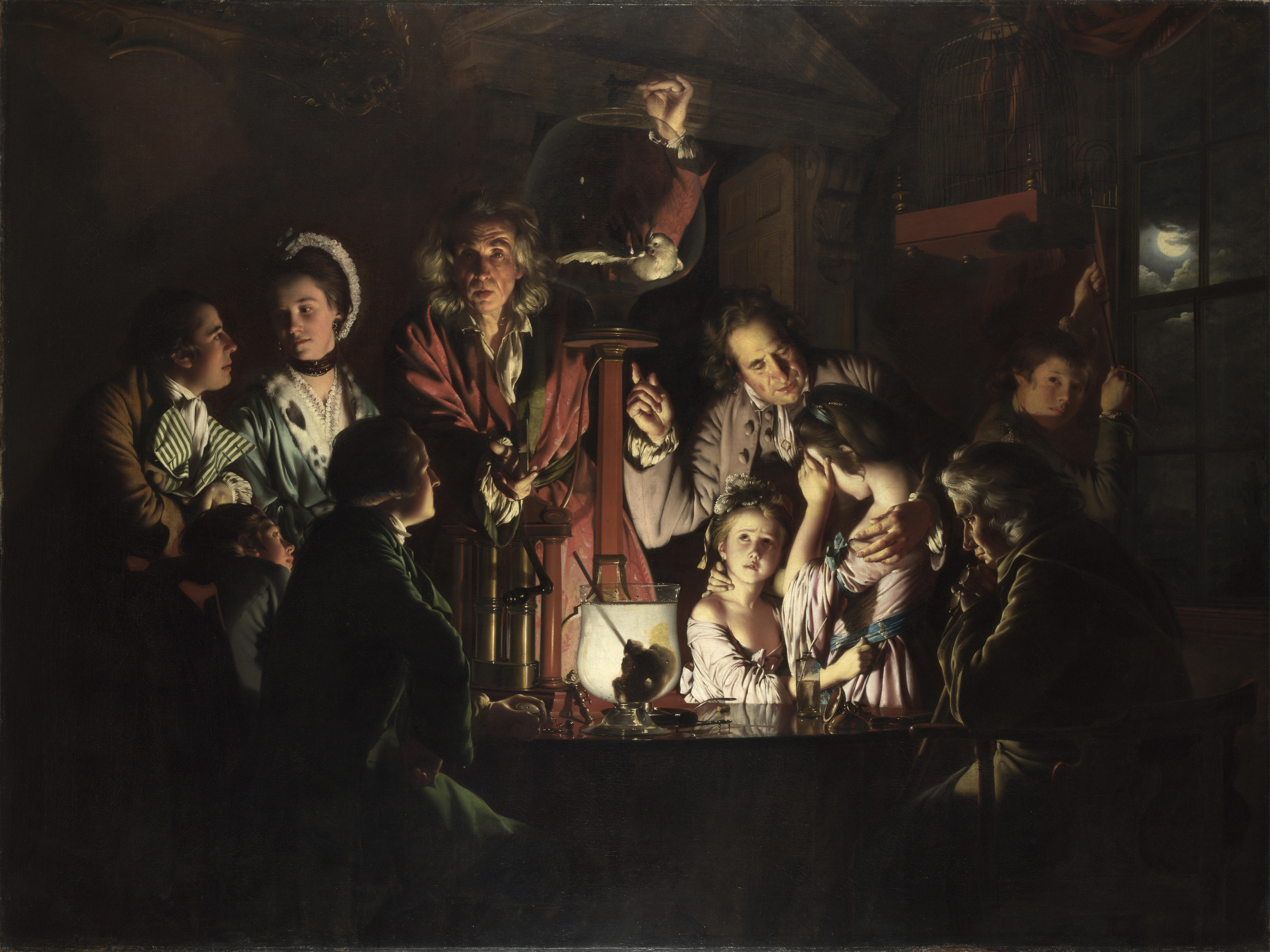
Joseph Wright of Derby, An Experiment on a Bird in the Air Pump 1768

Joseph Vernet, The Shipwreck, 1772, National Gallery of Art, Washington D.C.

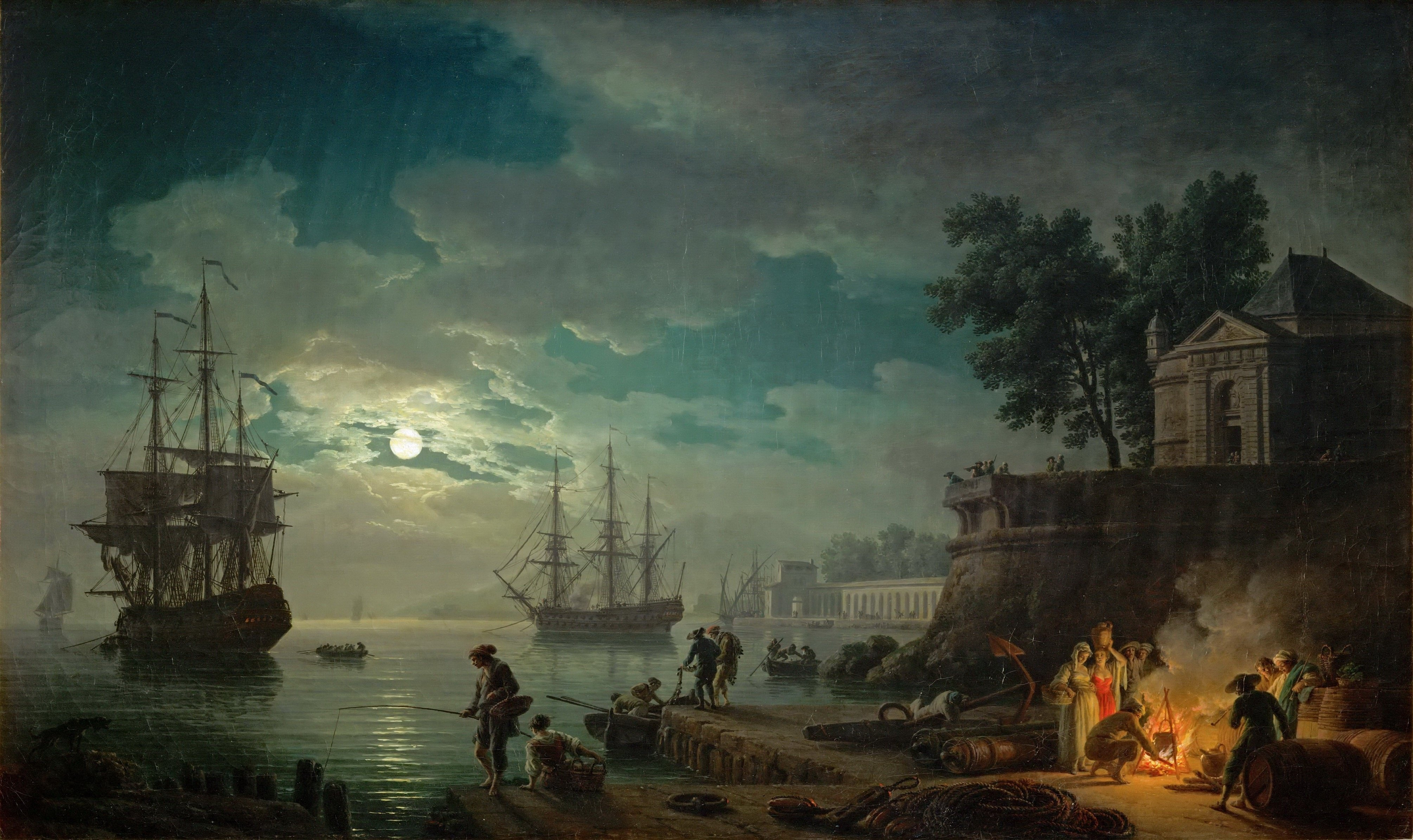
Joseph Vernet, Seaport by Moonlight, 1771, Louvre

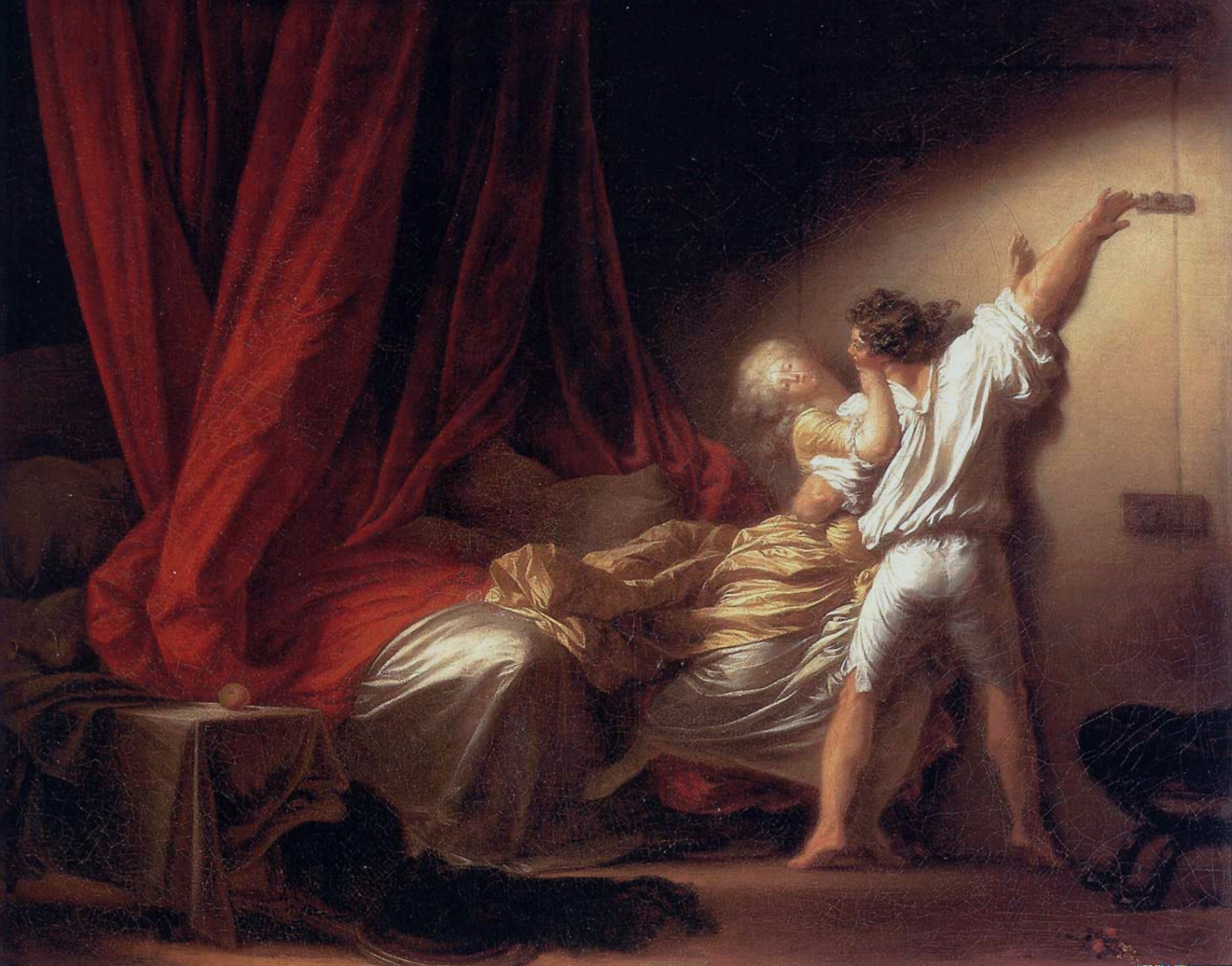
Jean-Honoré Fragonard, The Lock, 1776–1779, Louvre

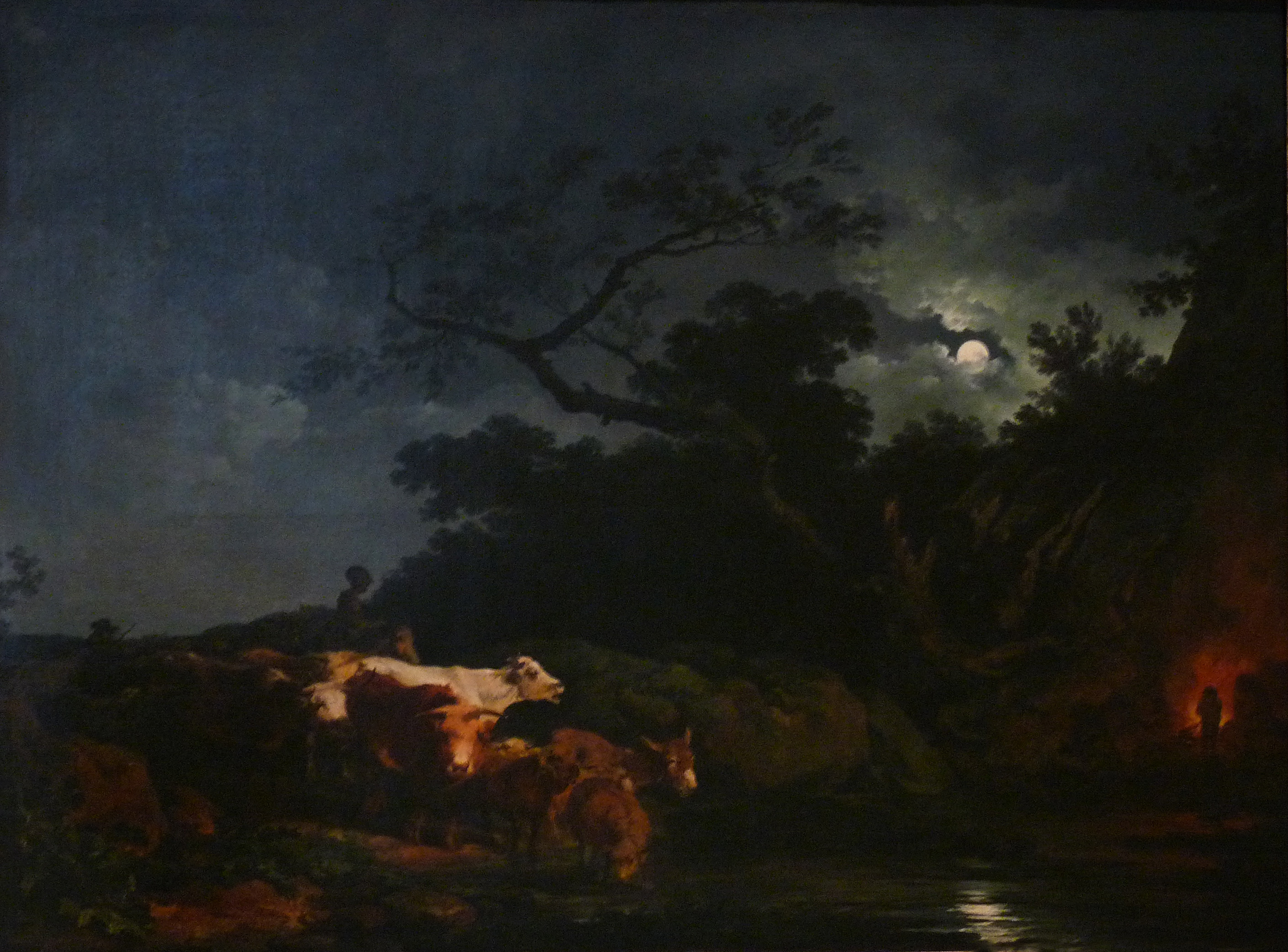
Philip James de Loutherbourg, Moonlight, 1777, Musée des Beaux-Arts de Strasbourg

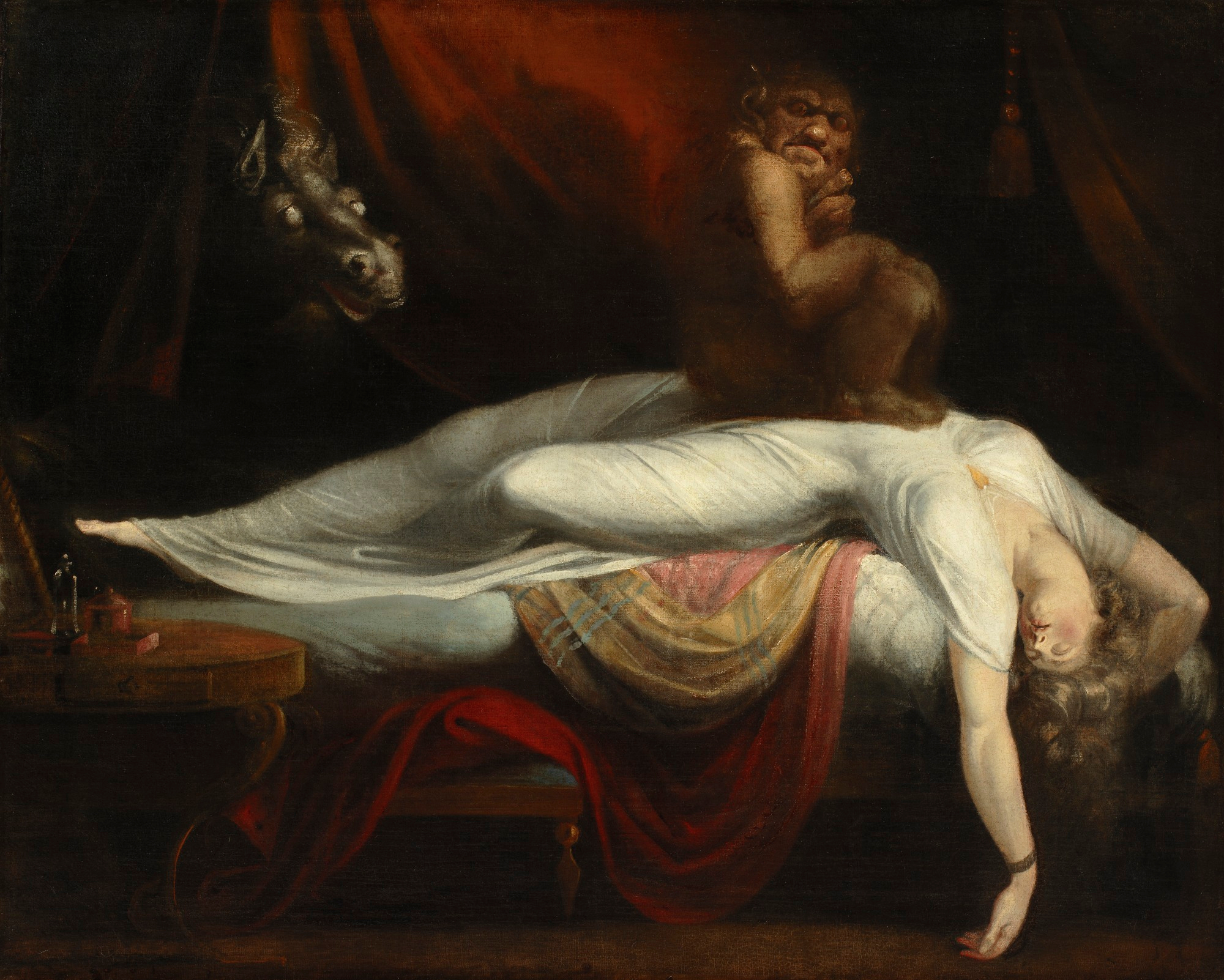
Henry Fuseli, 1781, The Nightmare, a classical artist whose themes often anticipate the Romantic

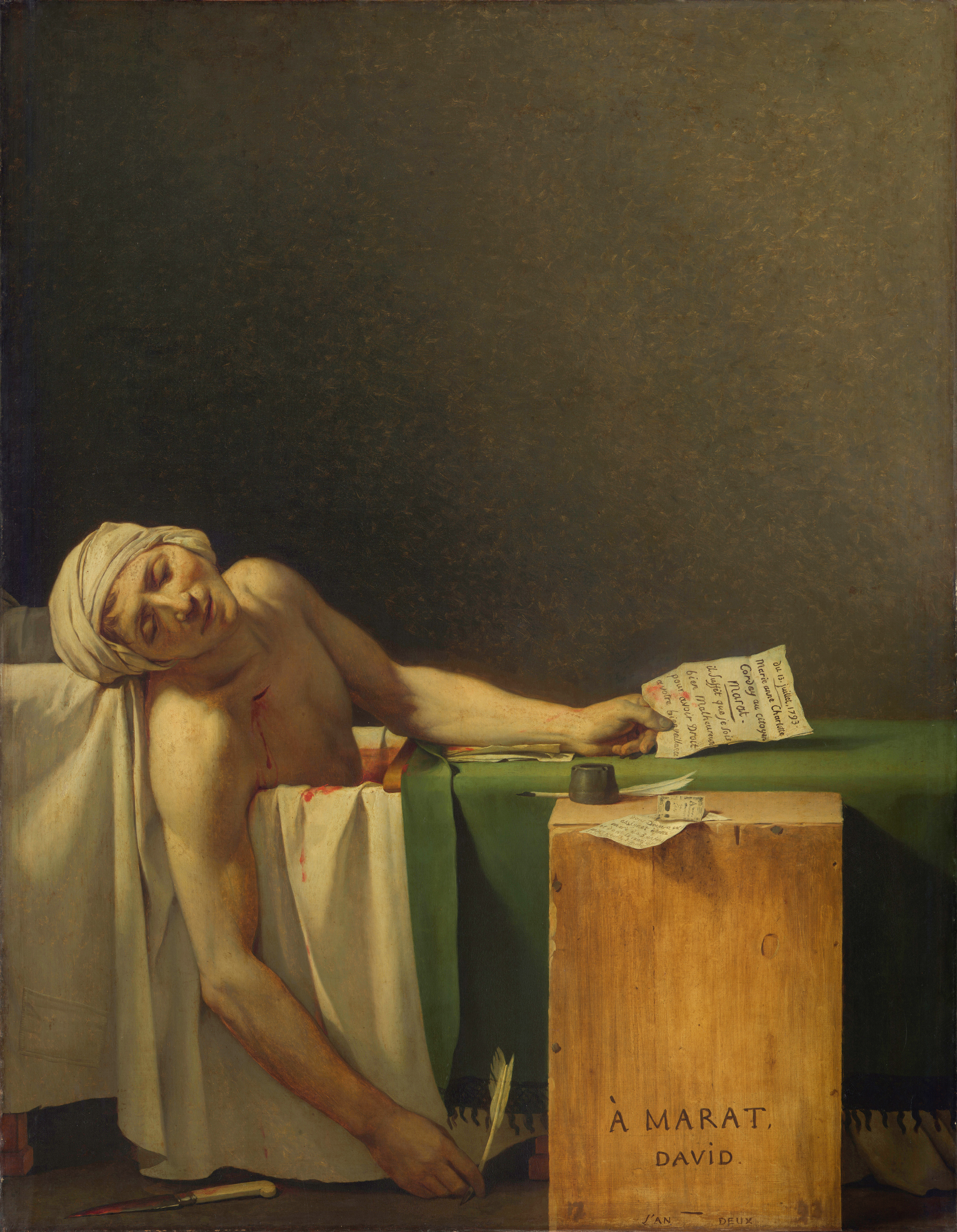
Jacques-Louis David, The Death of Marat, 1793, Royal Museums of Fine Arts of Belgium, Brussels

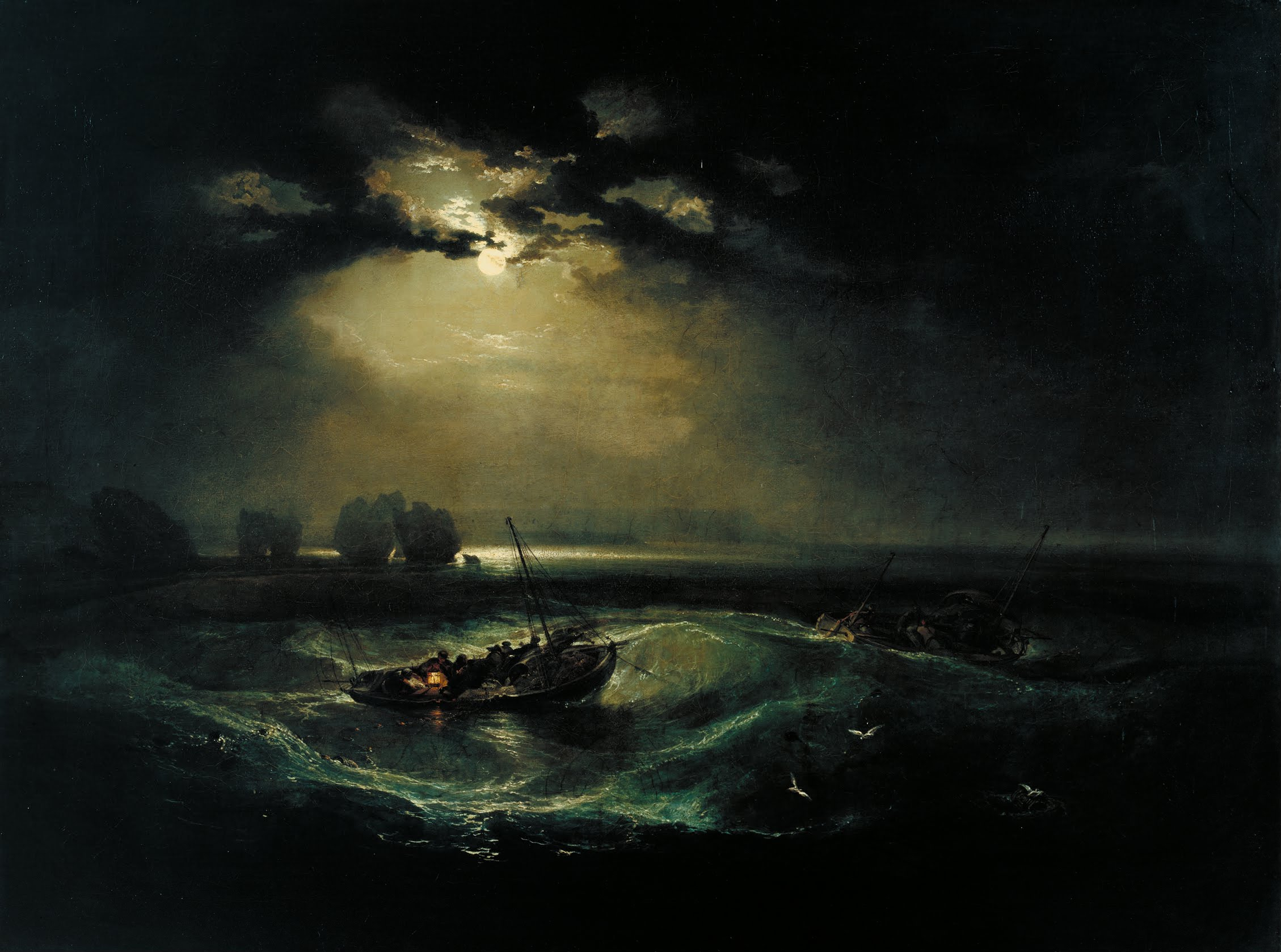
J. M. W. Turner, Fishermen at Sea, 1796

==== Joseph Turner ====
Joseph Mallord William Turner (23 April 1775 – 19 December 1851) was an English Romantic landscape painter, who is commonly known as "the painter of light".

==== Joseph Vernet ====
Claude-Joseph Vernet (14 August 1714 – 3 December 1789) was a French painter whose landscapes, including those of moonlights were popular with English aristocrats. His The Port of Rochefort (1763, Musée national de la Marine) is particularly notable; in the piece Vernet is able to achieve, according to art historian Michael Levey, one of his most 'crystalline and atmospherically sensitive skies'.

==== Joseph Wright ====
Joseph Wright of Derby (3 September 1734 – 29 August 1797) was an English landscape and portrait painter who is notable for his use of Chiaroscuro effect, which emphasises the contrast of light and dark, and for his paintings of candle-lit subjects. Wright is seen at his best in his candlelit subjects. The Three Gentlemen observing the 'Gladiator' (1765). A Philosopher Lecturing on the Orrery shows an early mechanism for demonstrating the movement of the planets around the sun. An Experiment on a Bird in the Air Pump (1768) shows people gathered round observing an early experiment into the nature of air and its ability to support life.

These factual paintings are considered to have metaphorical meaning too, the bursting into light of the phosphorus in front of a praying figure signifying the problematic transition from faith to scientific understanding and enlightenment, and the various expressions on the figures around the bird in the air pump indicating concern over the possible inhumanity of the coming age of science.

=== 19th century ===
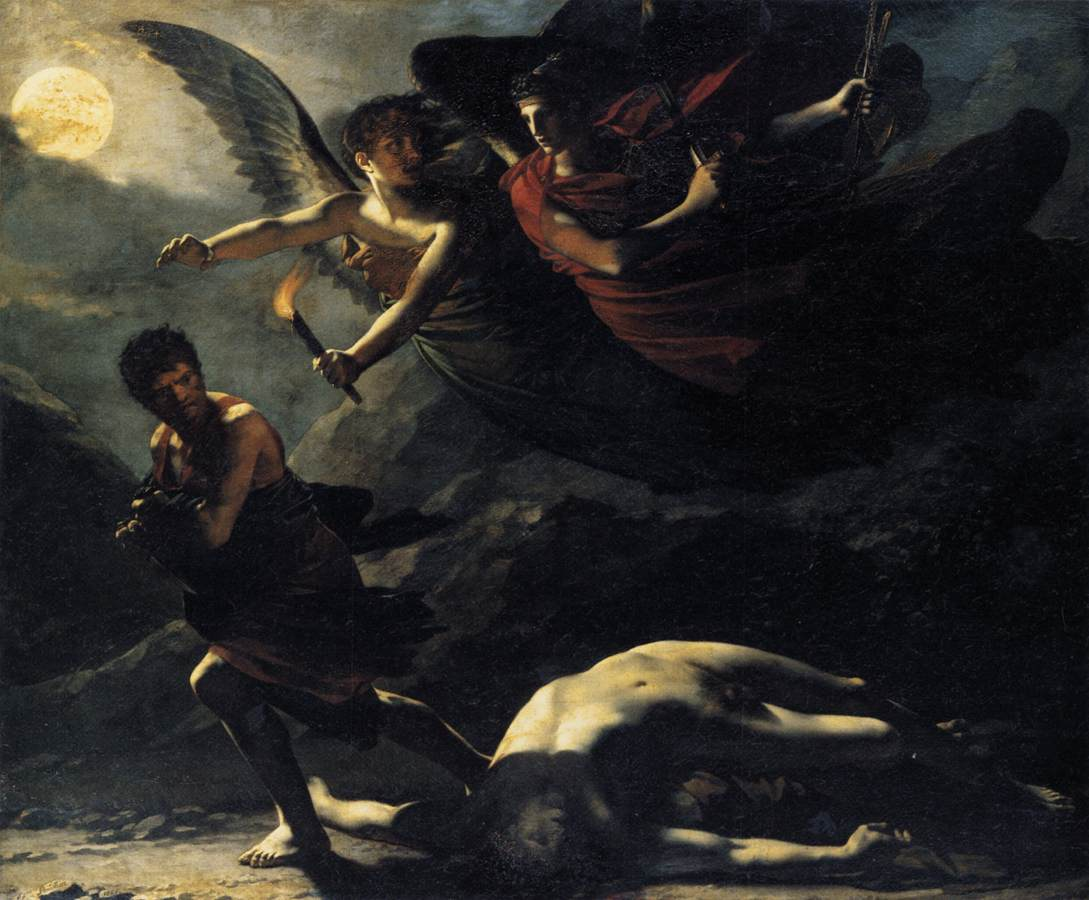
Pierre-Paul Prud'hon, Justice and Divine Vengeance Pursuing Crime, 1808, J. Paul Getty Museum, Getty Center, Los Angeles

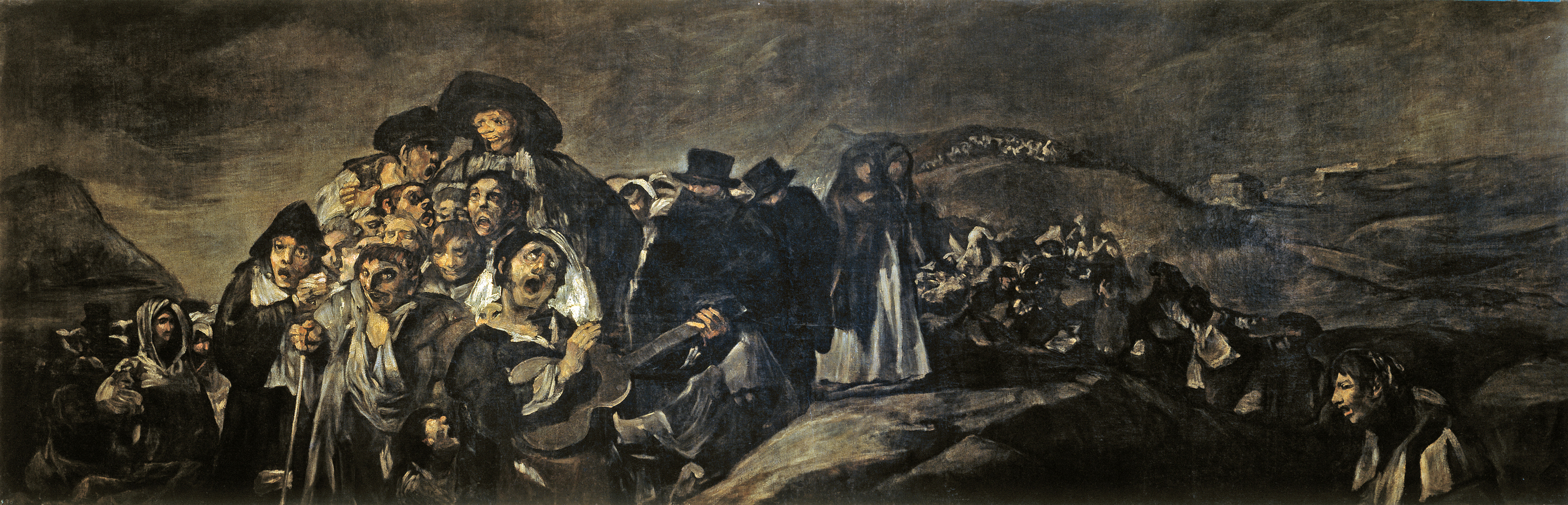
Francisco Goya, The Festival of San Isidro, 1819–1823, Museo del Prado, Madrid

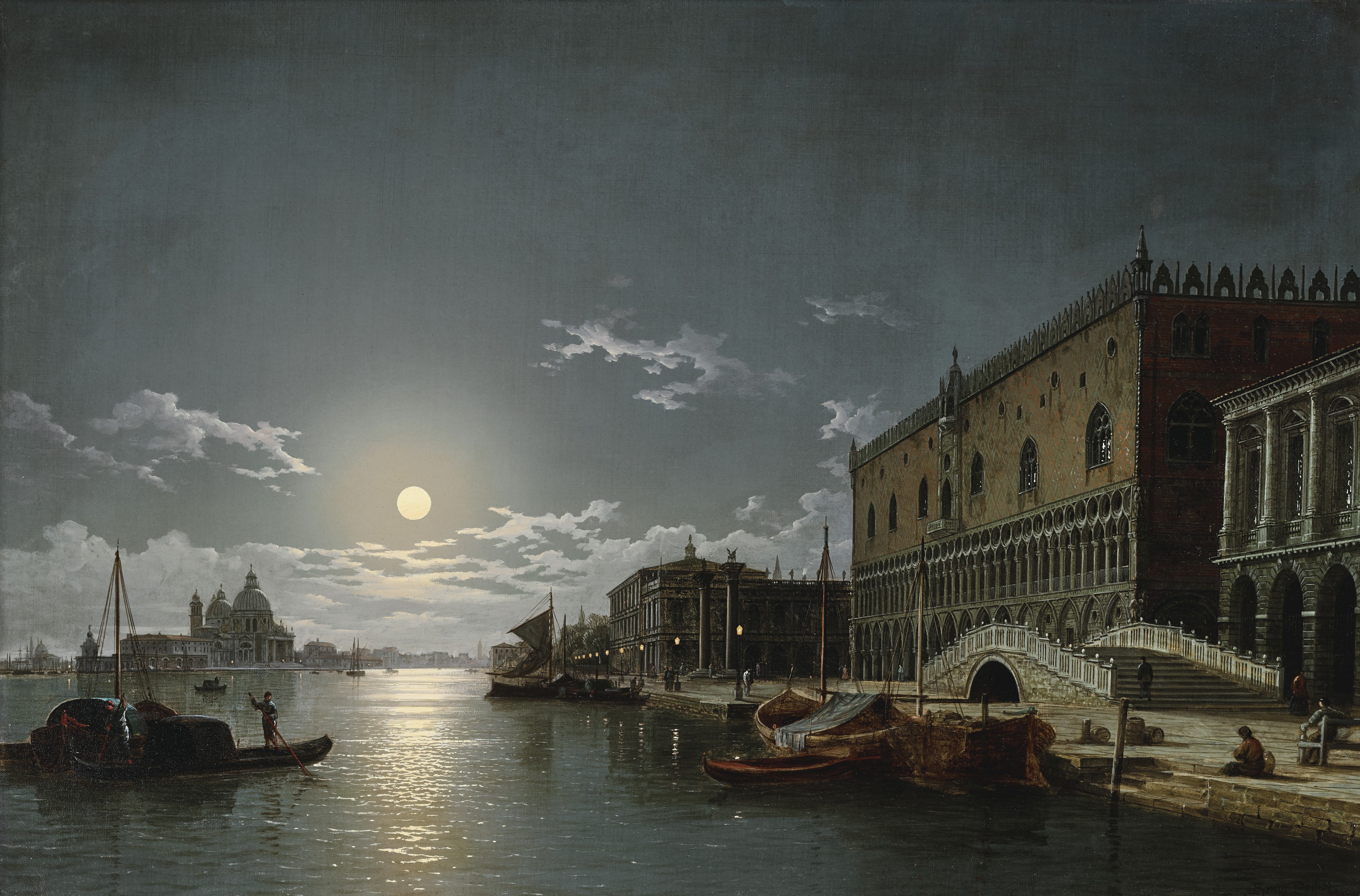
Henry Pether, Bacino di San Marco and Palazzo Ducale, Venice

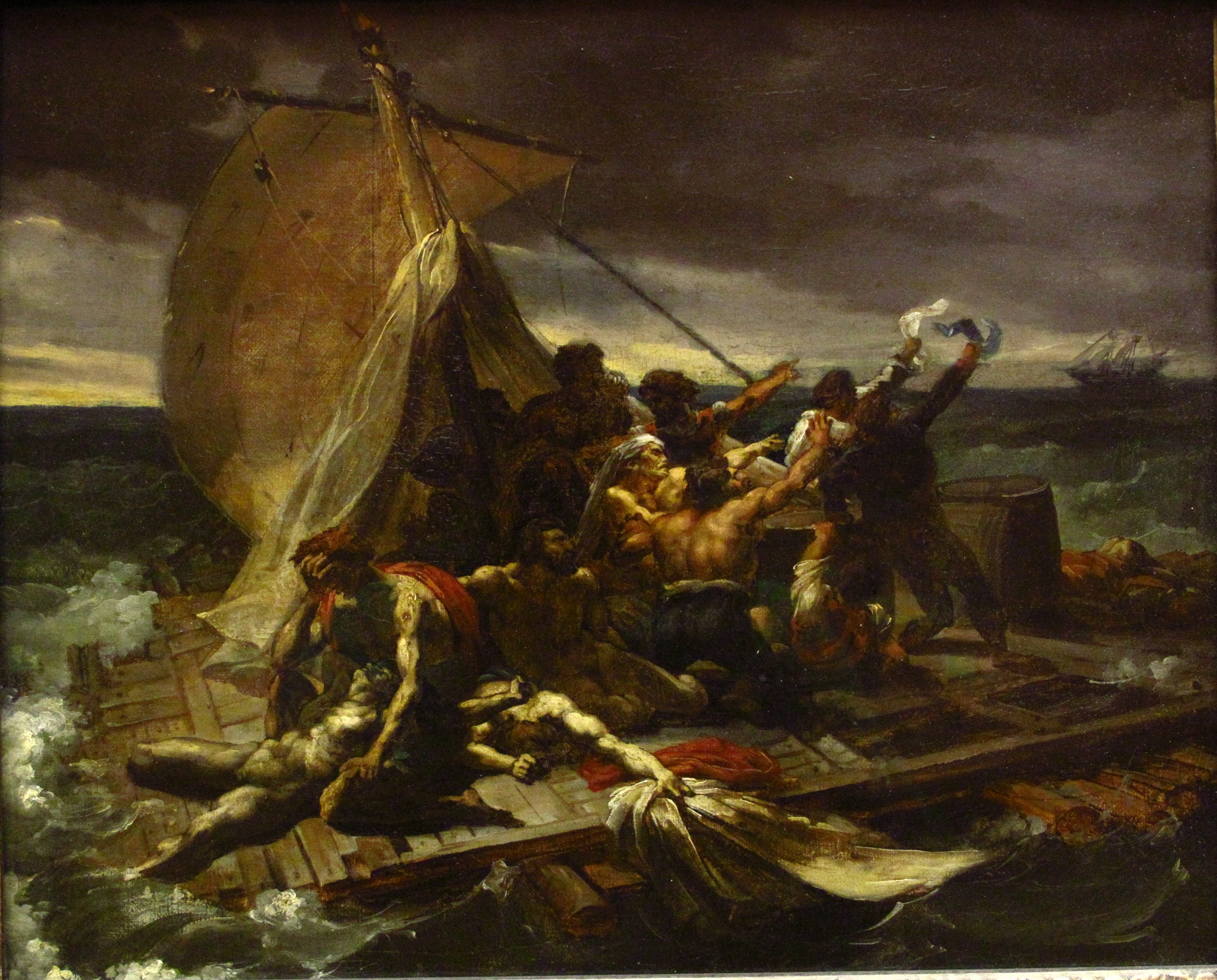
Théodore Géricault, Study for Raft of the Medusa, c. 1818–1819, Louvre

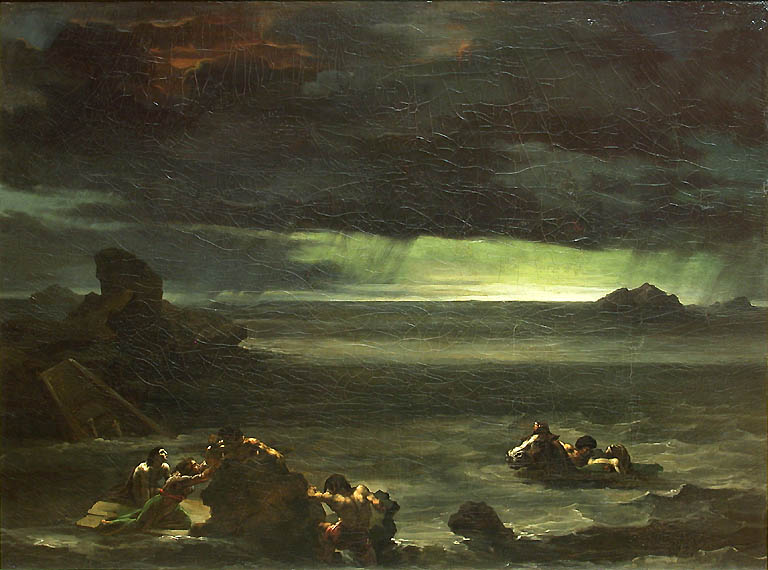
Théodore Géricault, After the Deluge, 1819

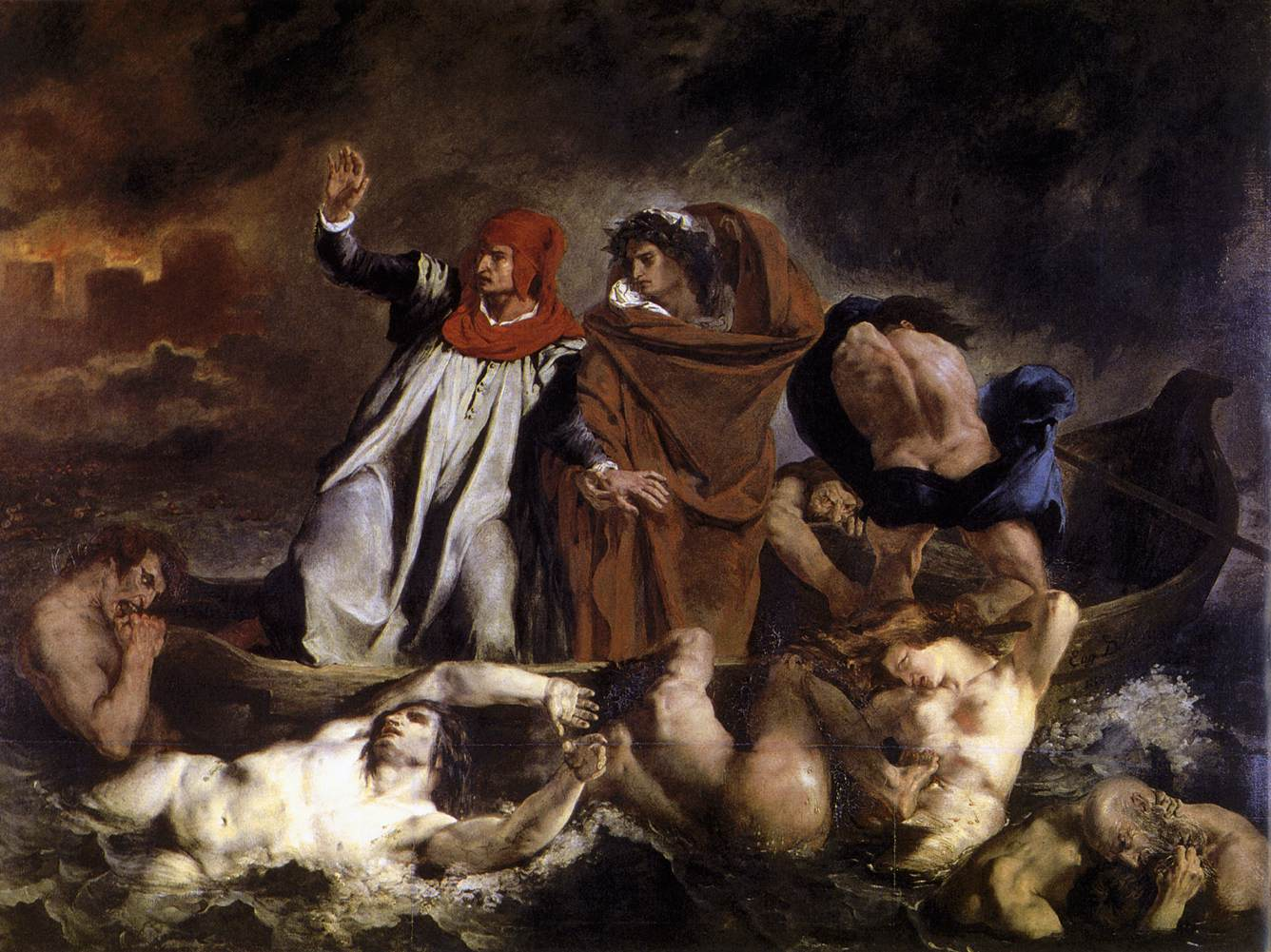
Eugène Delacroix, The Barque of Dante, 1822, Louvre

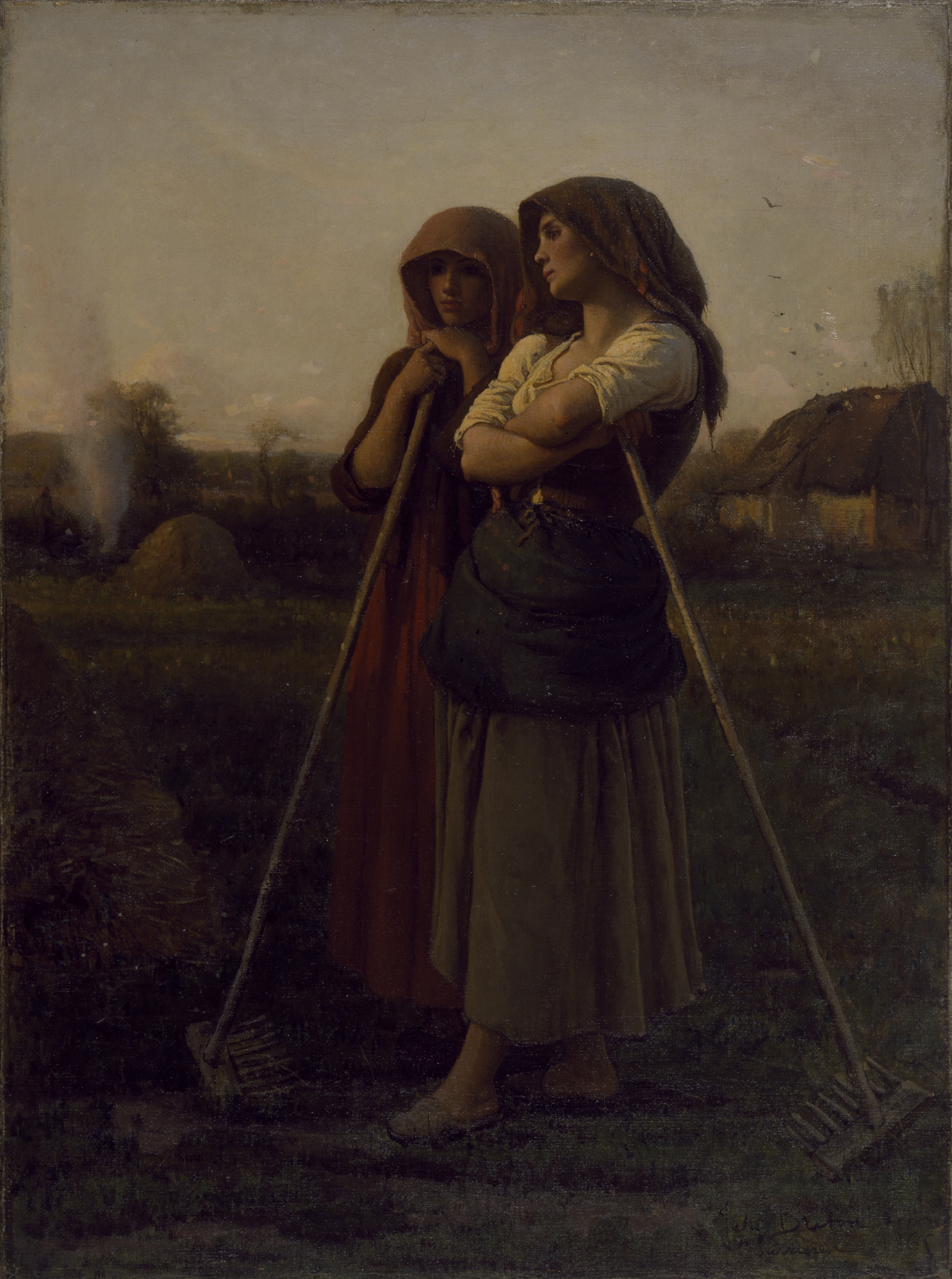
Jules Breton, The Close of Day, 1865

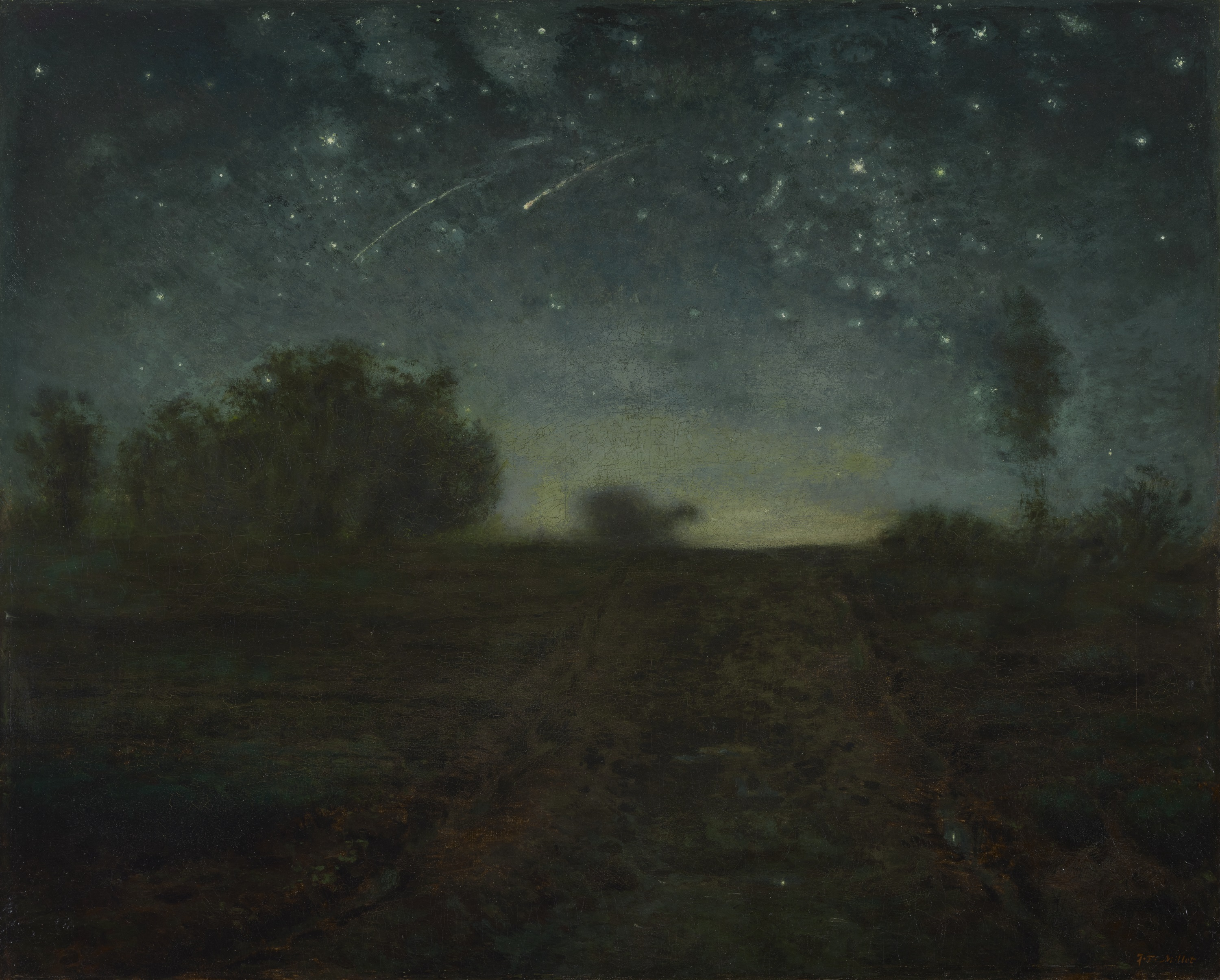
Jean-François Millet, Starry Night (Millet), c. 1850–1865

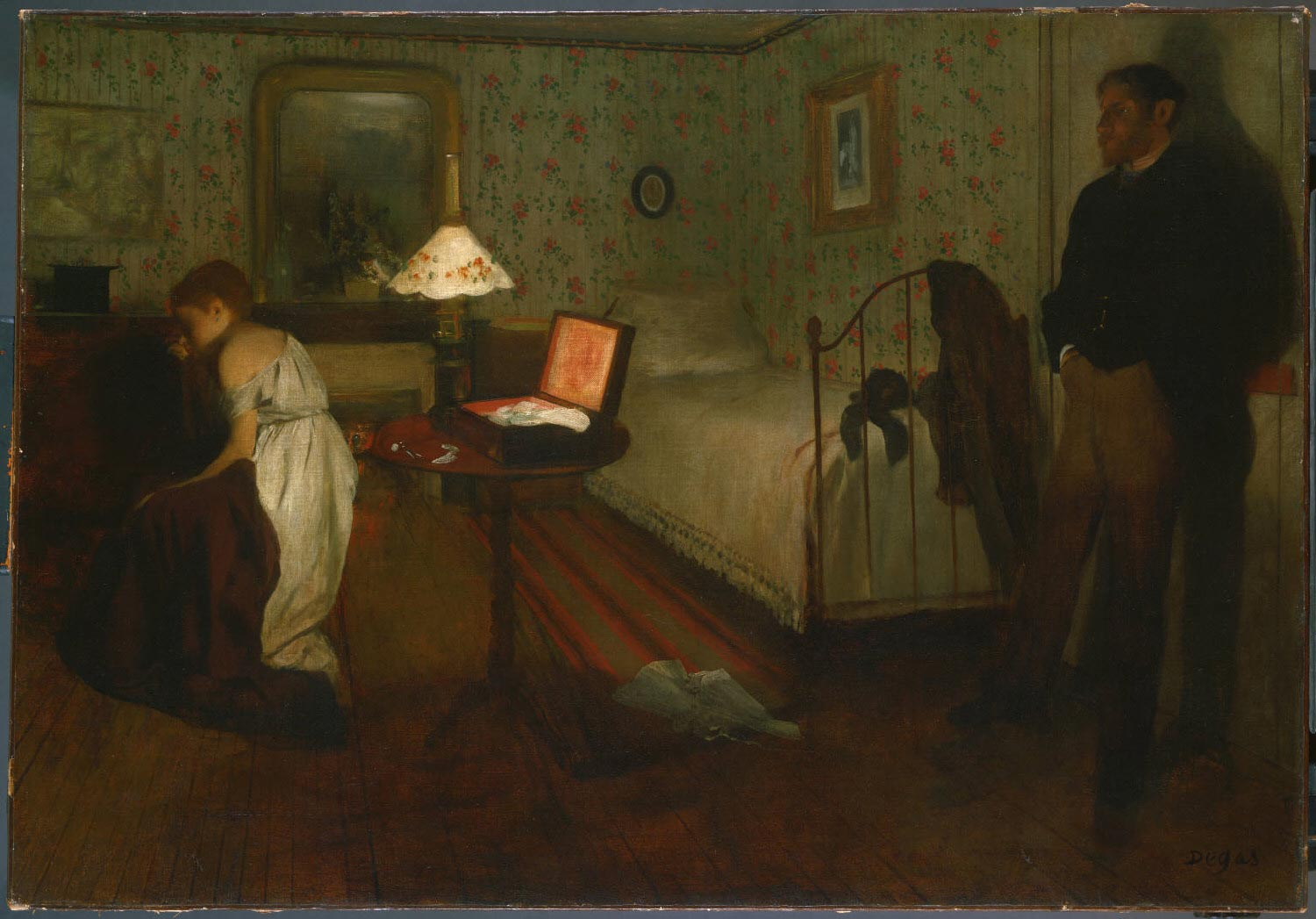
Edgar Degas, Interior (nicknamed The Rape) 1868–1869, Philadelphia Museum of Art

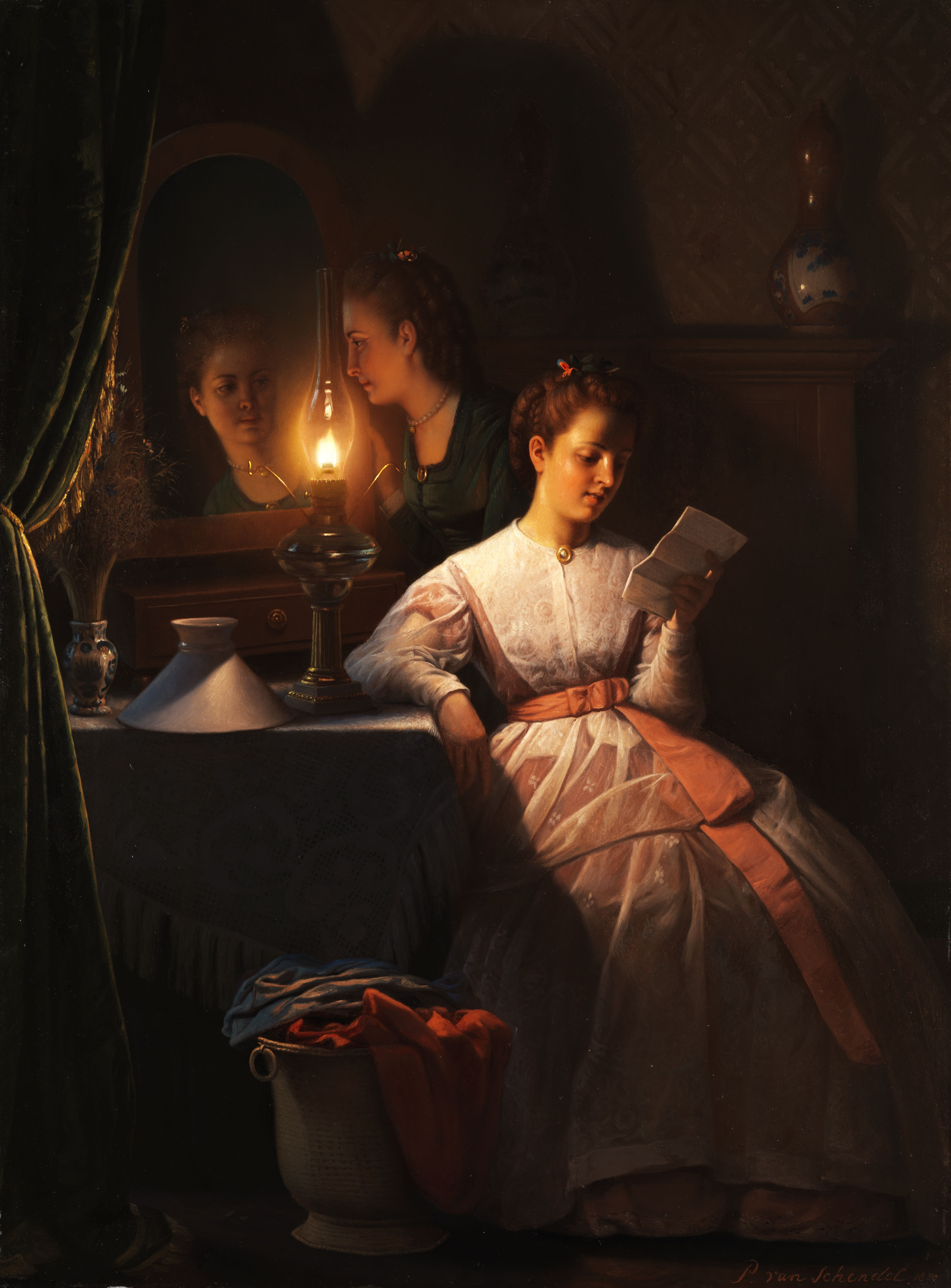
Petrus van Schendel, Der Liebesbrief, by 1870

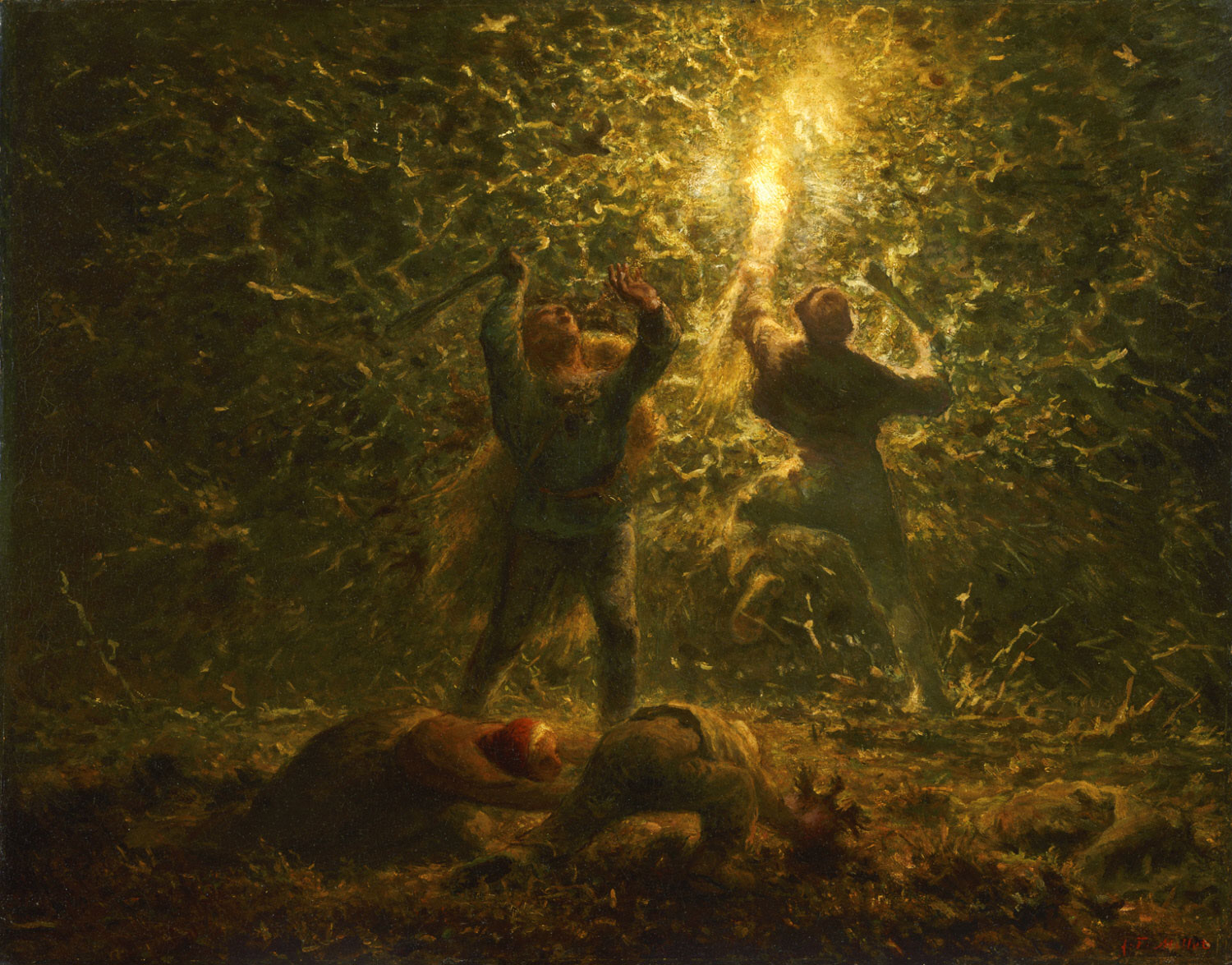
Jean-François Millet, Hunting Birds at Night, 1874

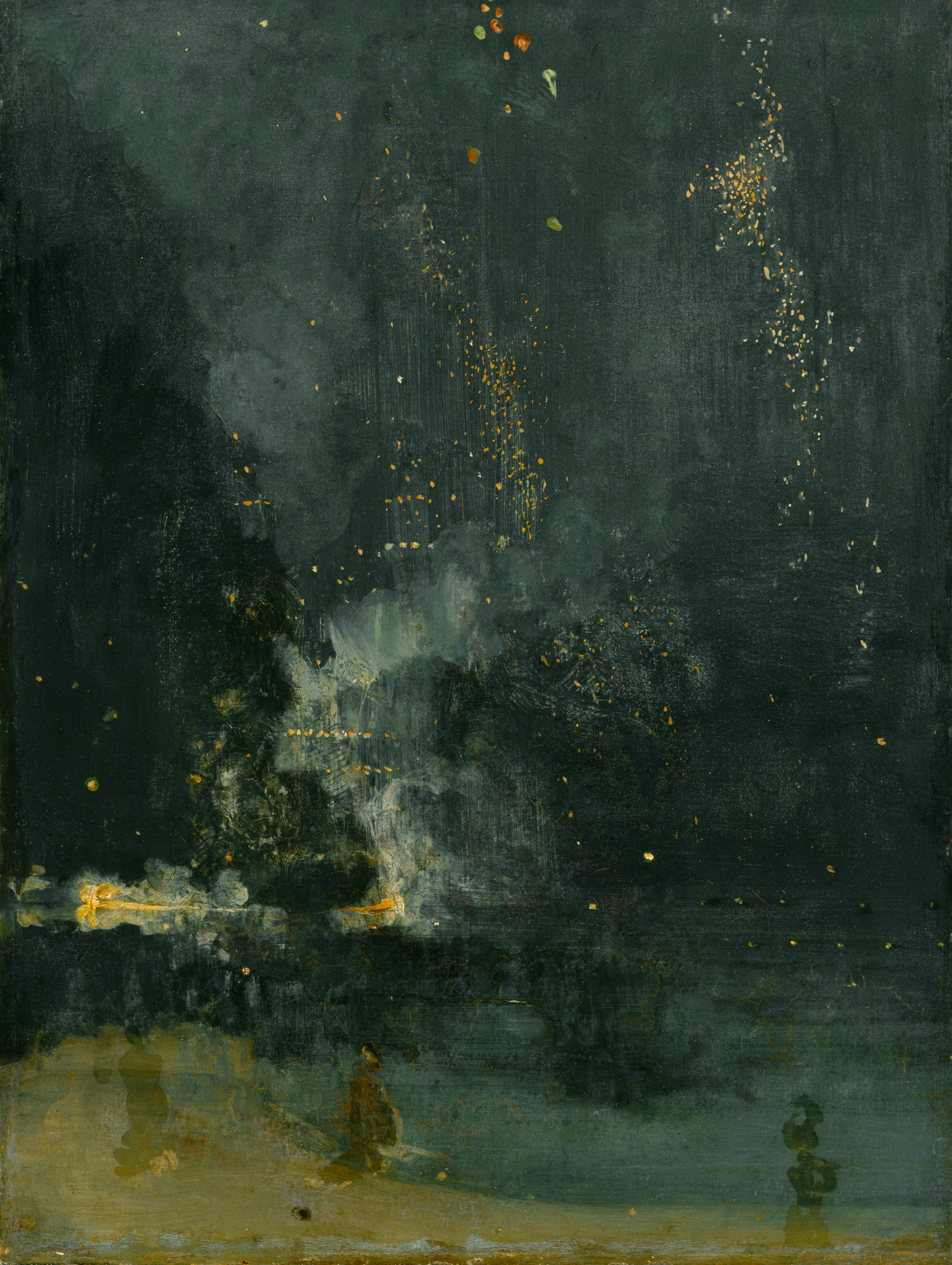
James McNeill Whistler, Nocturne in Black and Gold, The Falling Rocket, 1875

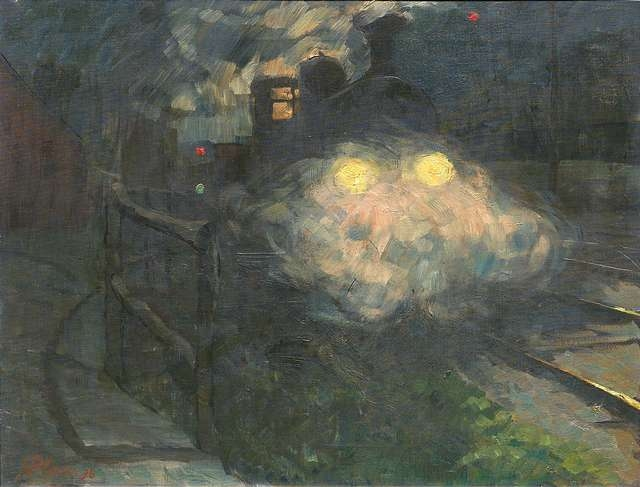
Evaporating locomotive at night, 1896 by Hermann Pleuer (1863–1911)

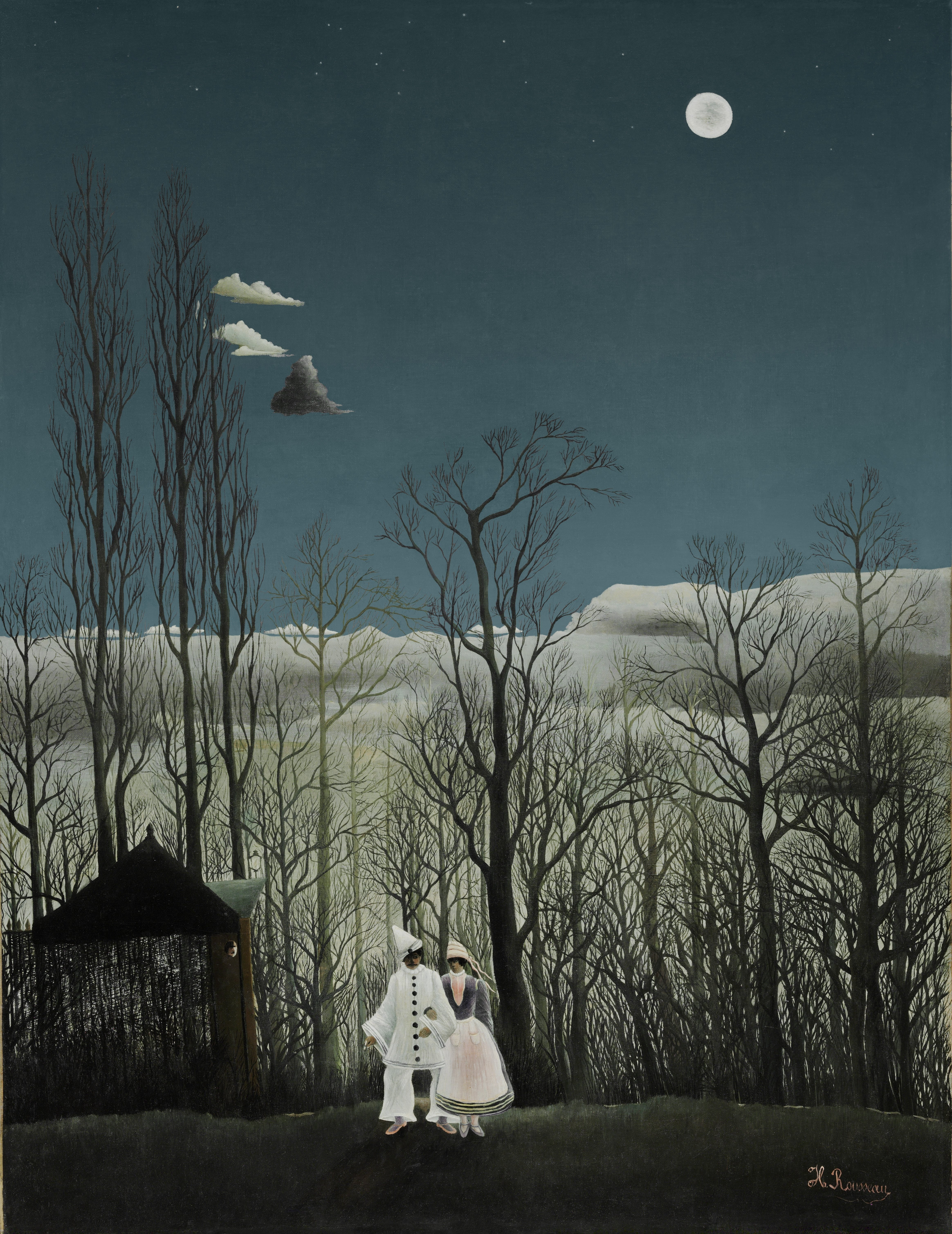
Henri Rousseau, A Carnival Evening, 1886, Philadelphia Museum of Art, Philadelphia, PA

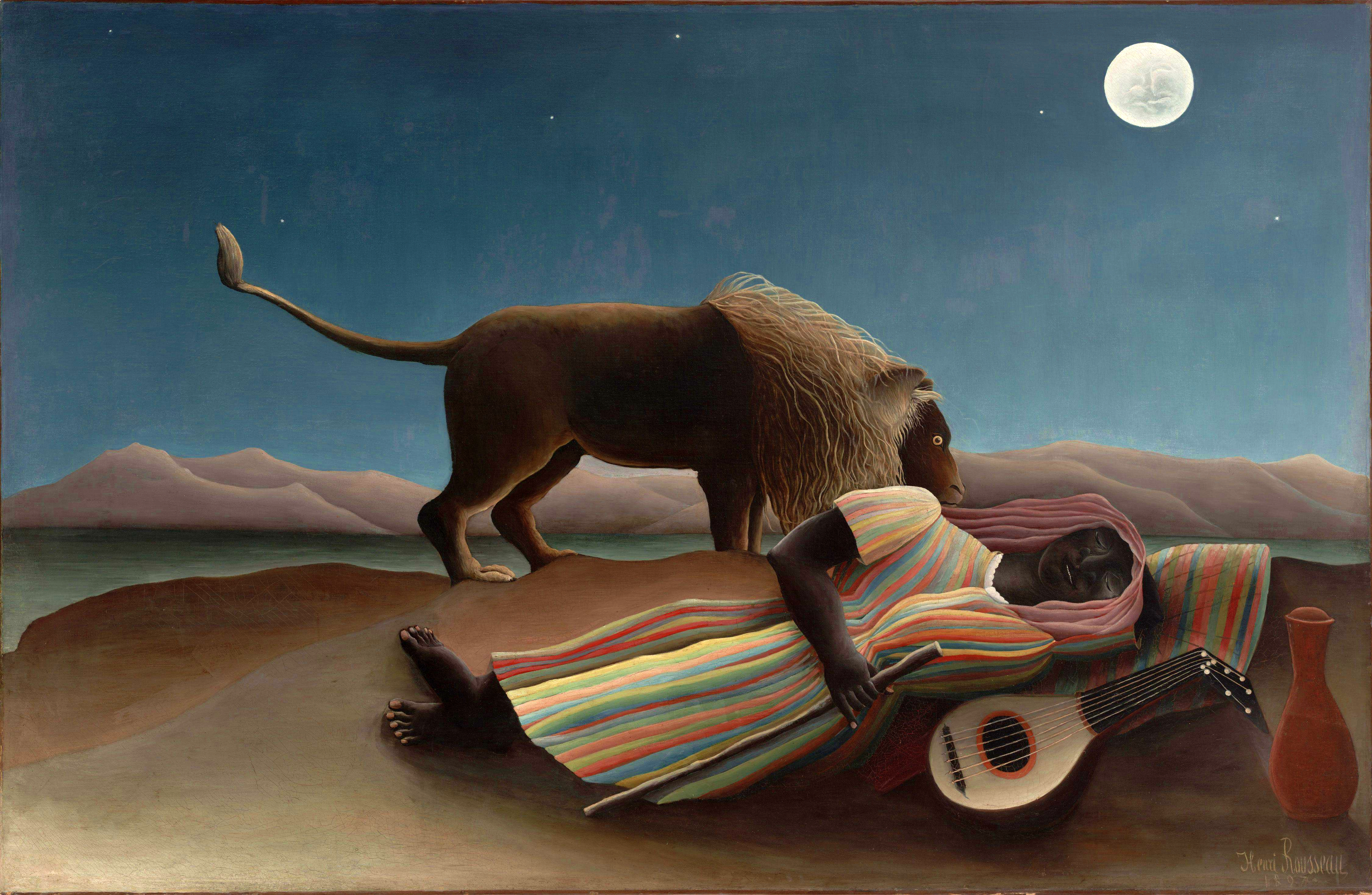
Henri Rousseau, La Bohémienne endormie (The Sleeping Gypsy – Zingara che dorme), 1897, Museum of Modern Art

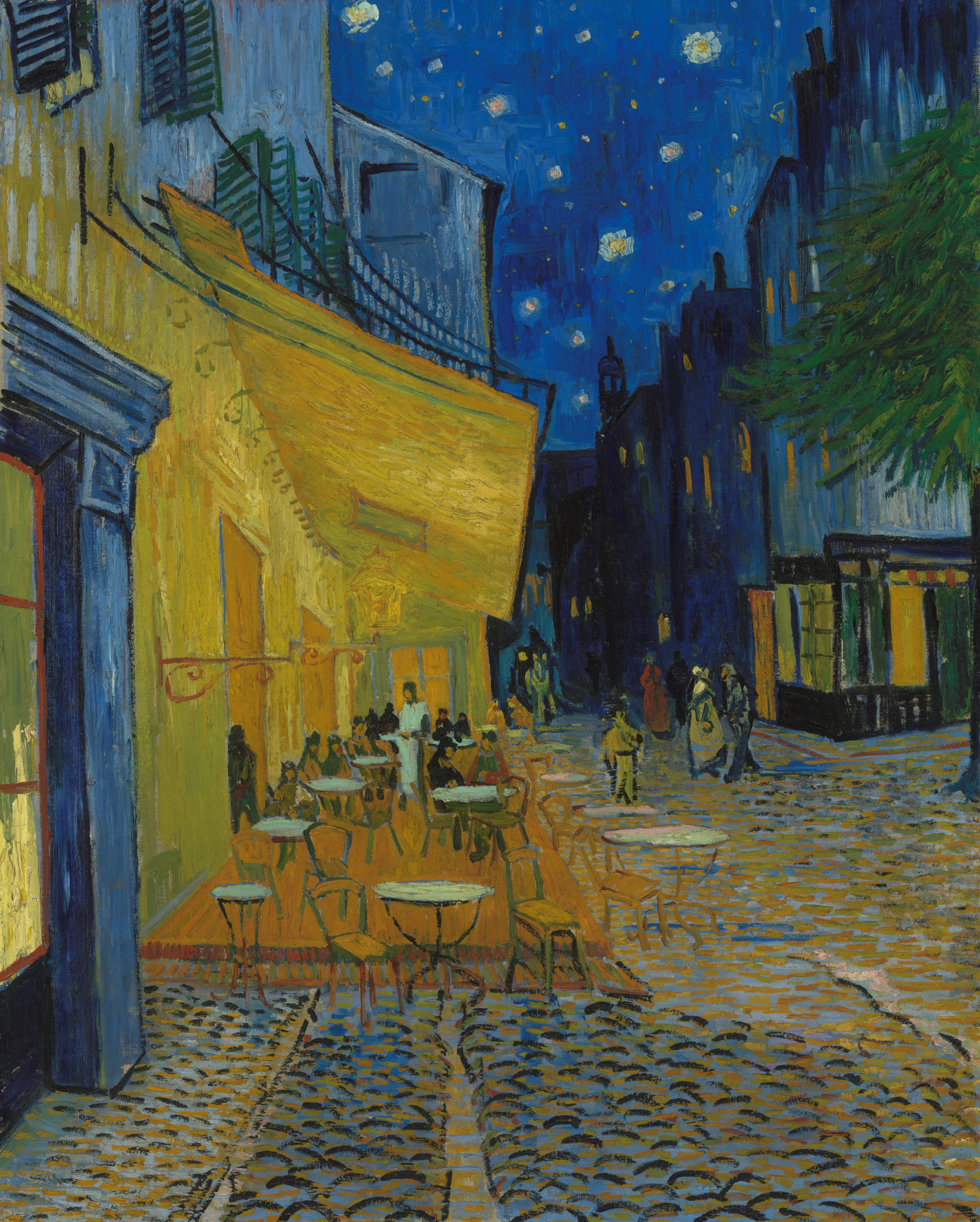
Vincent van Gogh, Café Terrace at Night, September 1888, Kröller-Müller Museum, Otterlo, The Netherlands

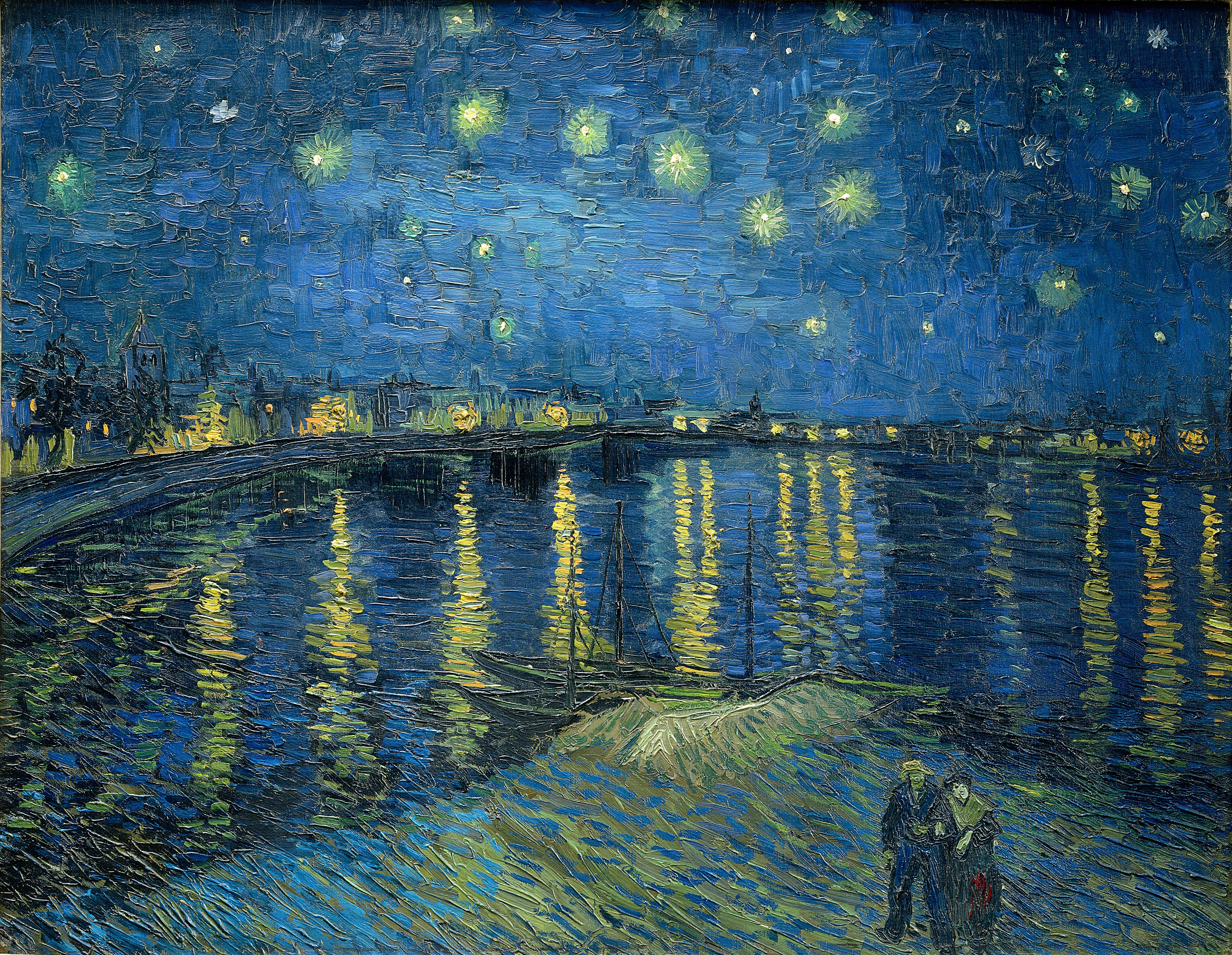
Vincent van Gogh, Starry Night Over the Rhone, 1888

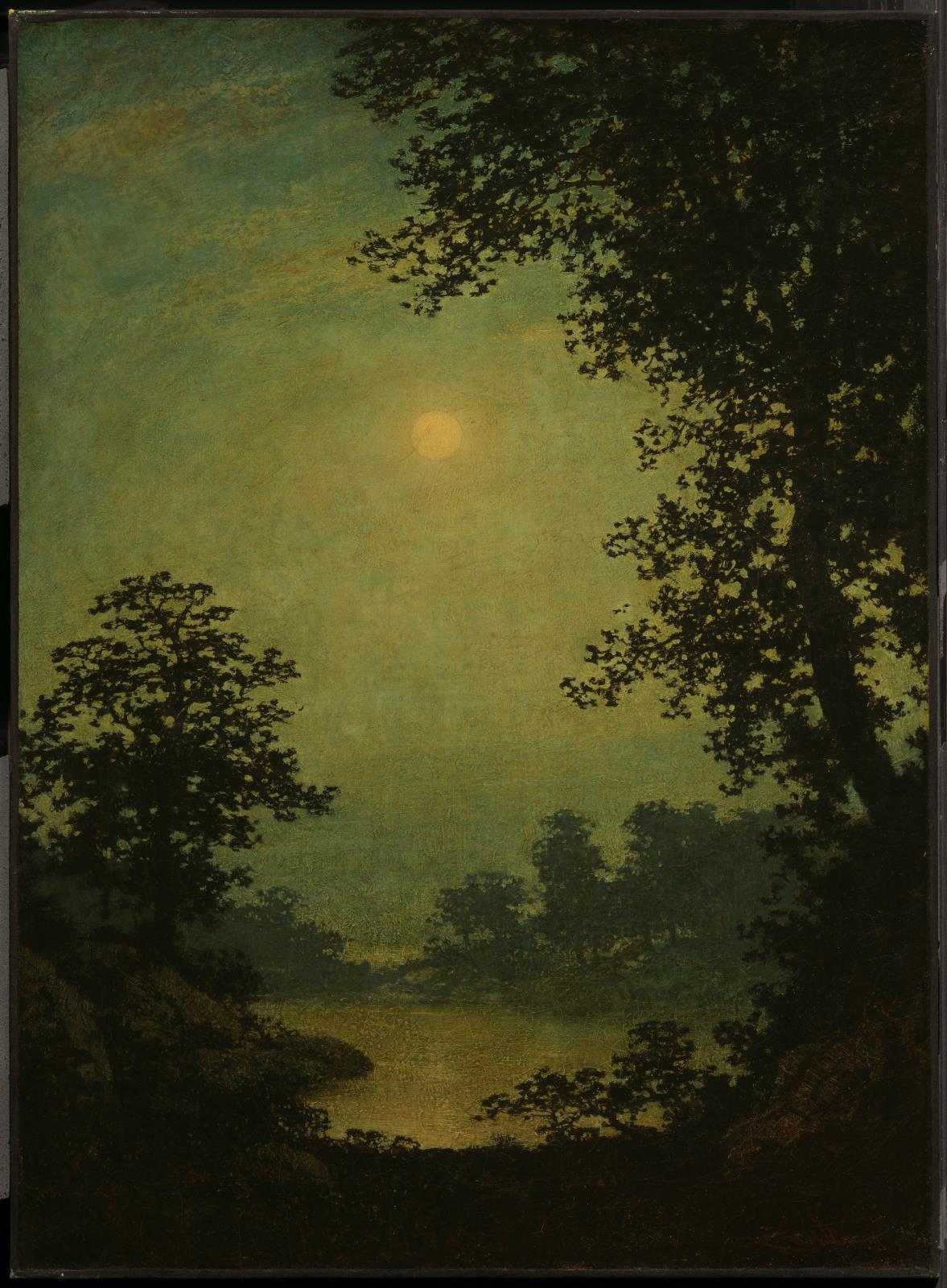
Ralph Albert Blakelock, Moonlight Sonata, 1889–1892, Museum of Fine Arts, Boston

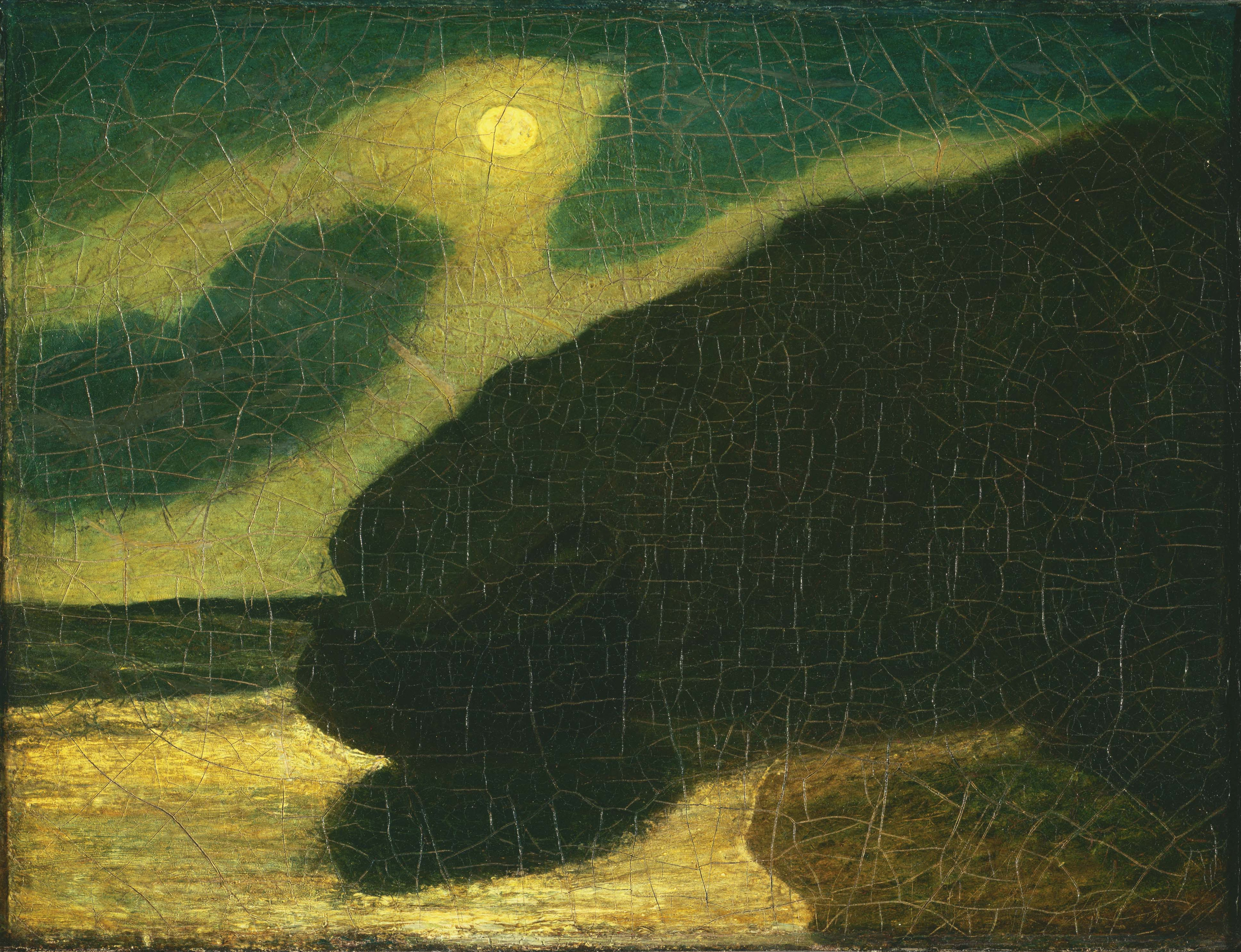
Albert Pinkham Ryder, Seacoast in Moonlight, 1890, the Phillips Collection, Washington, D.C.

==== Théodore Géricault ====
Théodore Géricault (26 September 1791 – 26 January 1824) was an influential French artist and one of the pioneers of the Romantic movement.

==== Atkinson Grimshaw ====
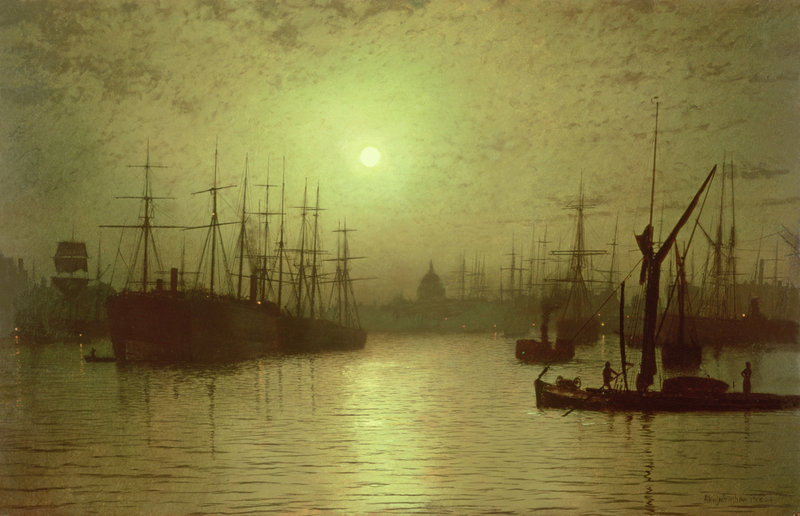
John Atkinson Grimshaw, Nightfall on the Thames, 1880

Atkinson Grimshaw (6 September 1836 – 13 October 1893) was a Victorian-era artist known for his city night-scenes and landscapes. His careful painting and skill in lighting effects meant that he captured both the appearance and the mood of a scene in minute detail. His "paintings of dampened gas-lit streets and misty waterfronts conveyed an eerie warmth as well as alienation in the urban scene."

On Hampstead Hill is considered one of Grimshaw's finest works, exemplifying his skill with a variety of light sources, in capturing the mood of the passing of twilight into night. In his later career his urban scenes under twilight or yellow streetlighting were popular with his middle-class patrons.

In the 1880s, Grimshaw maintained a London studio in Chelsea, not far from the studio of James Abbott McNeill Whistler. After visiting Grimshaw, Whistler remarked that "I considered myself the inventor of Nocturnes until I saw Grimmy's moonlit pictures." Unlike Whistler's Impressionistic night scenes Grimshaw worked in a realistic vein: "sharply focused, almost photographic," his pictures innovated in applying the tradition of rural moonlight images to the Victorian city, recording "the rain and mist, the puddles and smoky fog of late Victorian industrial England with great poetry."

==== Petrus van Schendel ====
Petrus van Schendel (1806–1870) was a Dutch Romantic painter, etcher and draughtsman. Van Schendel specialised in nocturnal Dutch market scenes, exploring the effects the soft light had upon his subjects, as a result he was named Monsieur Chandelle by the French. Van Schendel was inspired by these famous forebears, but brought a unique nineteenth century mood to his night scenes. He eloquently captured the mysterious world of city markets illuminated by lamps and moonlight before the dawn.

==== James Abbott McNeill Whistler ====
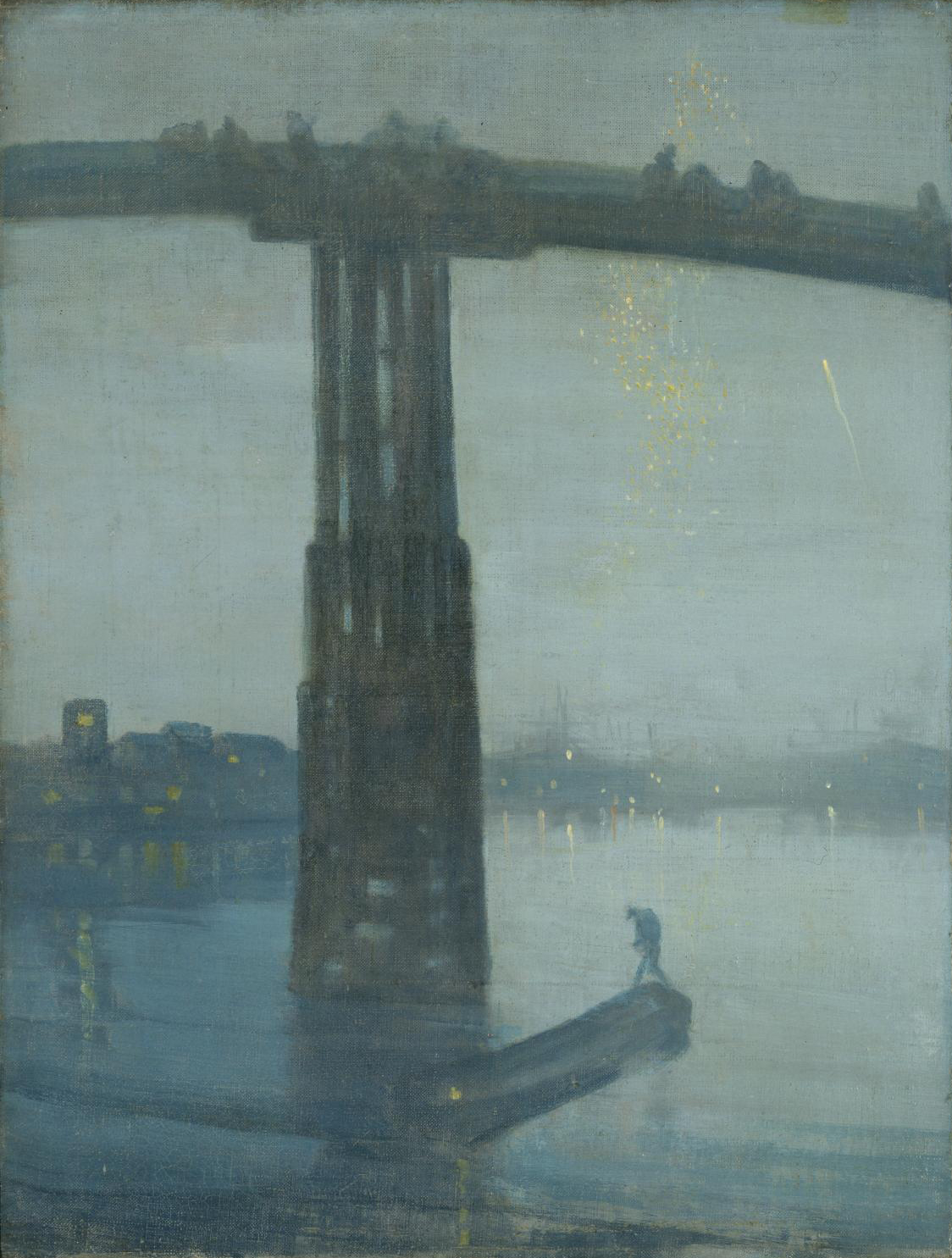
James Abbott McNeill Whistler, Nocturne in Blue and Gold: Old Battersea Bridge, c. 1872–1875

James Abbott McNeill Whistler (11 July 1834 – 17 July 1903) was an American-born, British-based artist.

"Nocturne" was a term that was normally applied to certain types of musical compositions before Whistler, inspired by the language of music, began using the word within the titles of many of his works, such as Nocturne in Blue and Silver (1871), in the collection of the Tate Gallery, London, United Kingdom.

Whistler's ill-advised journey in 1866 to Valparaíso, Chile, resulted in Whistler's first three nocturnal paintings—which he termed "moonlights" and later re-titled as "nocturnes"—night scenes of the harbor painted with a blue or light green palette. Later in London, he painted several more nocturnes over the next ten years, many of the River Thames and of Cremorne Gardens, a pleasure park famous for its frequent fireworks displays, which presented a novel challenge to paint. In his maritime nocturnes, Whistler used highly thinned paint as a ground with lightly flicked color to suggest ships, lights, and shore line. Some of the Thames paintings also show compositional and thematic similarities with the Japanese prints of Hiroshige.

In 1877 Whistler sued the art critic John Ruskin for libel after the critic condemned his painting Nocturne in Black and Gold: The Falling Rocket. Ruskin accused Whistler of "asking two hundred guineas for throwing a pot of paint in the public's face." Whistler won the suit, but was awarded one farthing for damages. The cost of the case bankrupted him. It has been suggested John Ruskin had had CADASIL and the visual disturbances this condition caused him might have been a factor in his irritation at this particular painting. Whistler published his account of the trial in the pamphlet Whistler v. Ruskin: Art and Art Critics, included in his later The Gentle Art of Making Enemies (1890).

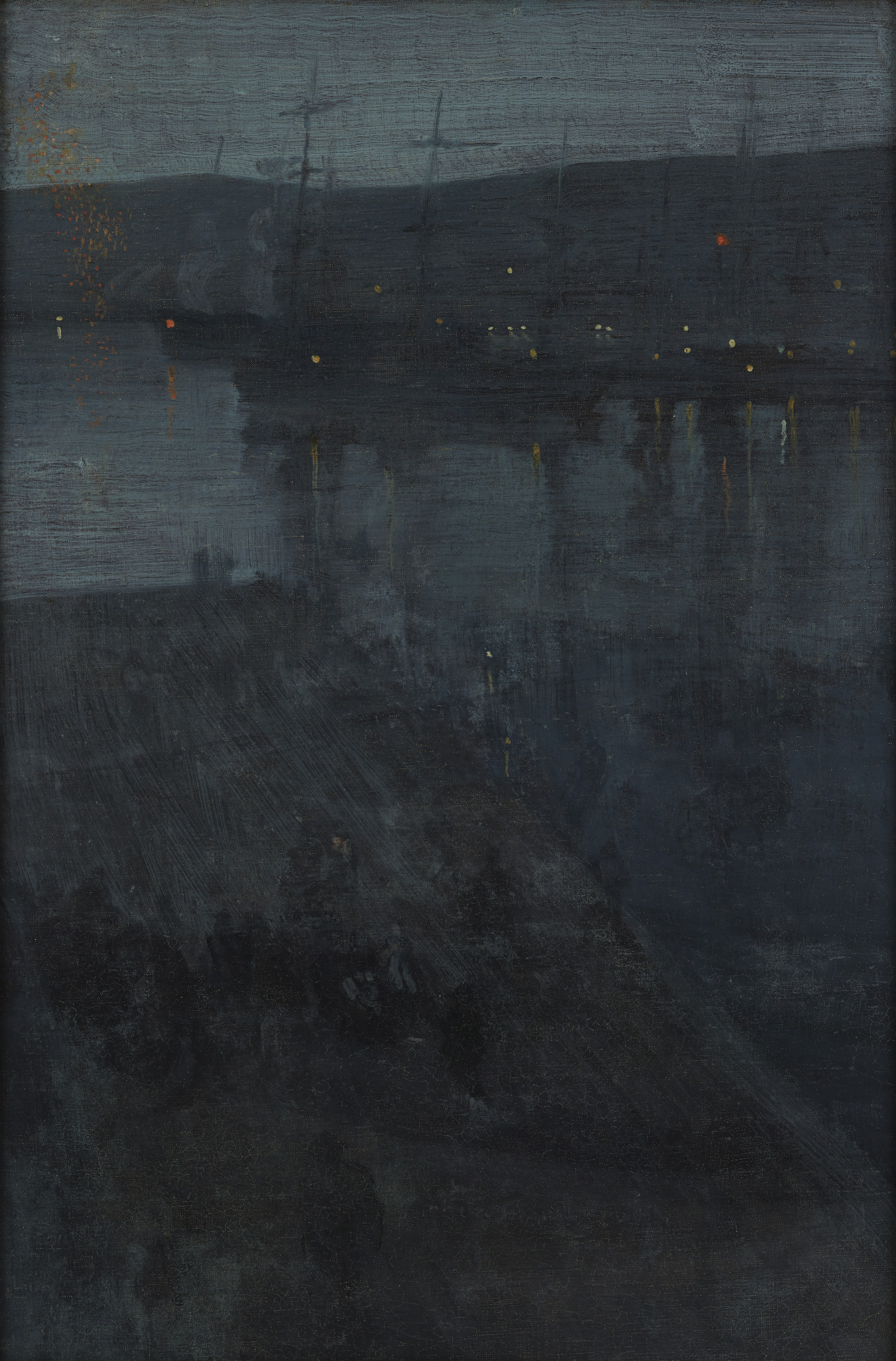
Nocturne in Blue and Gold: Valparaiso, 1866

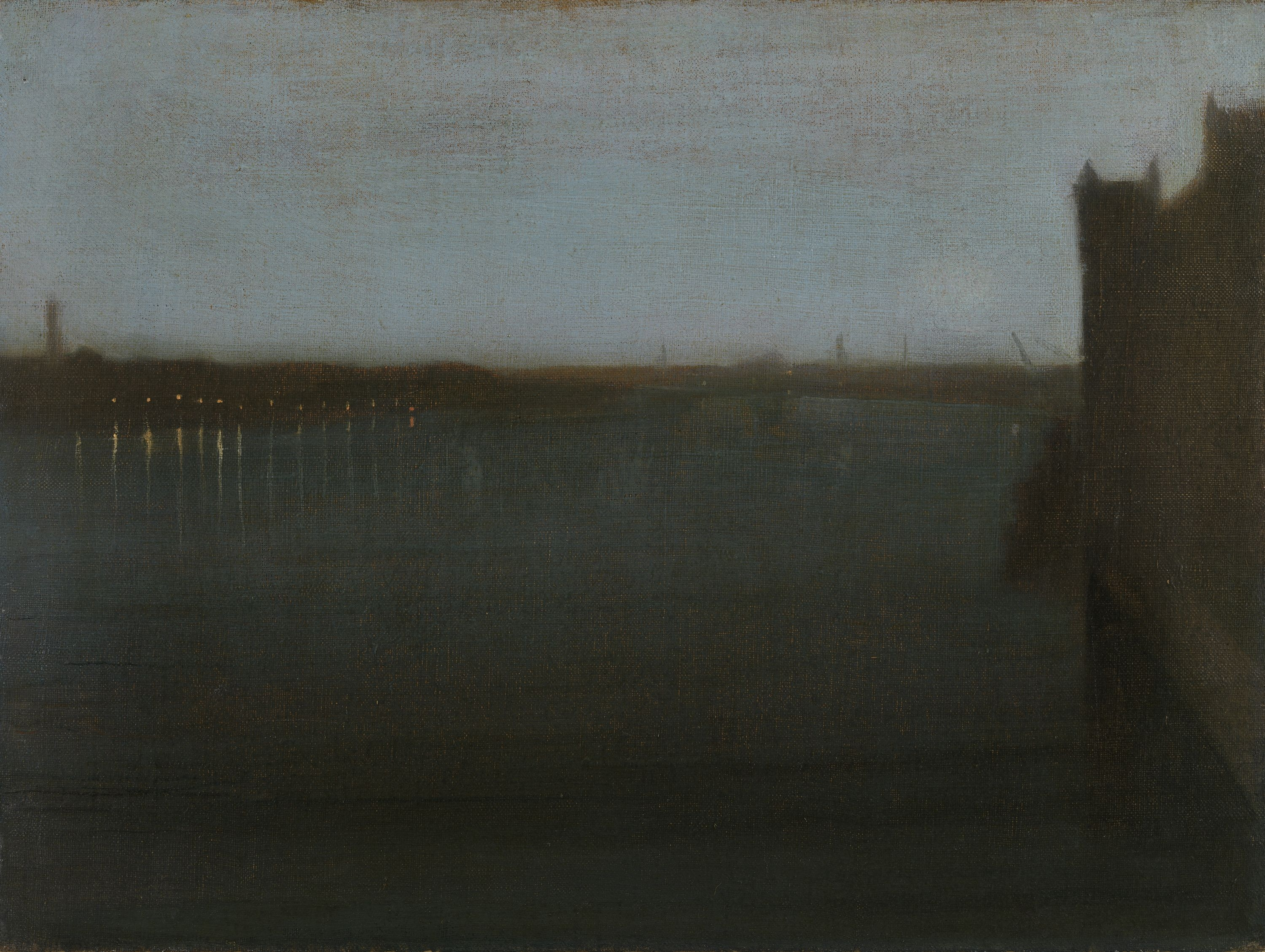
Nocturne in Gray and Gold, Westminster Bridge, c. 1871–1874

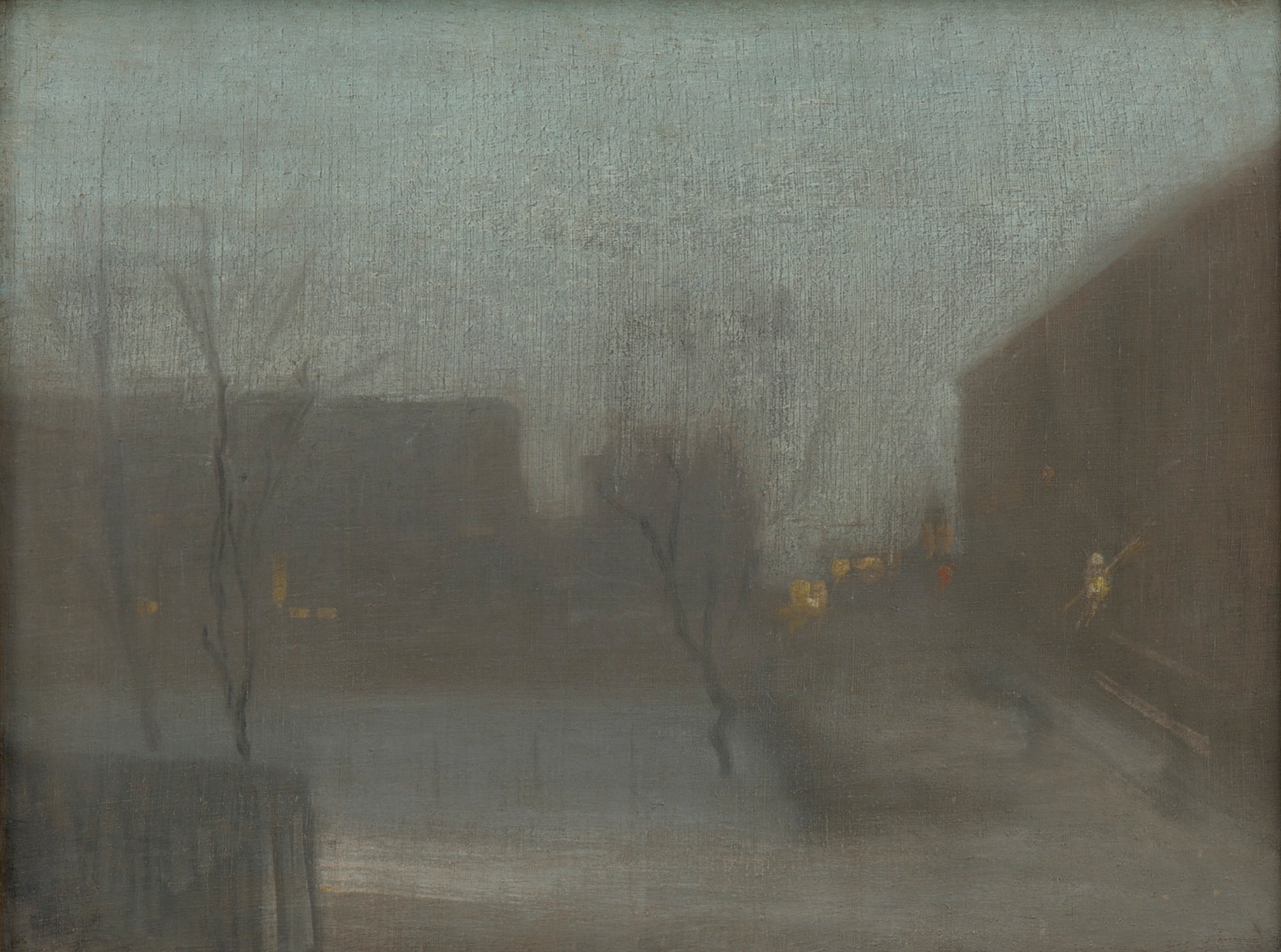
Nocturne Trafalgar Square Chelsea Snow, 1876

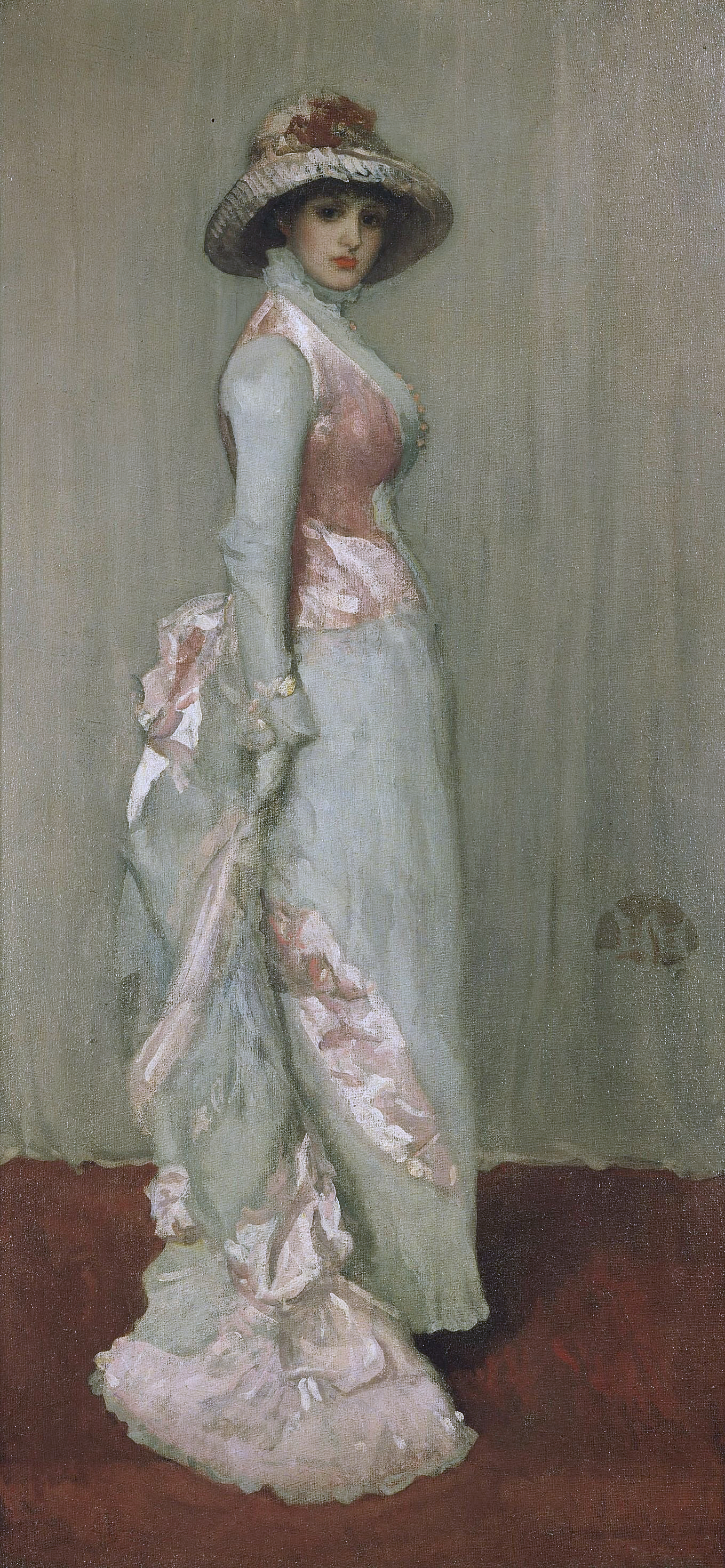
Nocturne in Pink and Grey, Portrait of Lady Meux, 1881–1882

=== 20th century ===
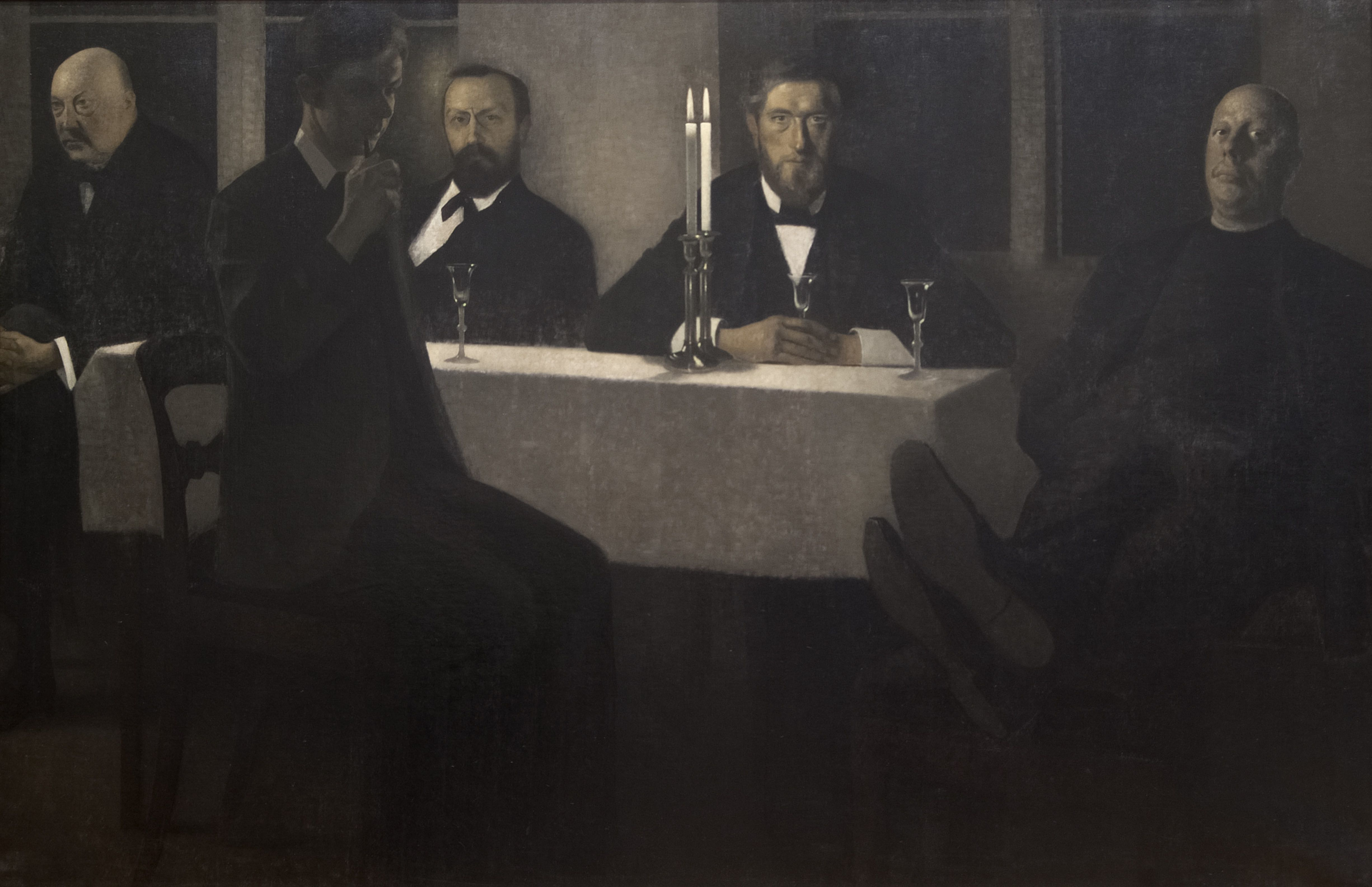
Vilhelm Hammershøi, Five Portraits, 1901–02

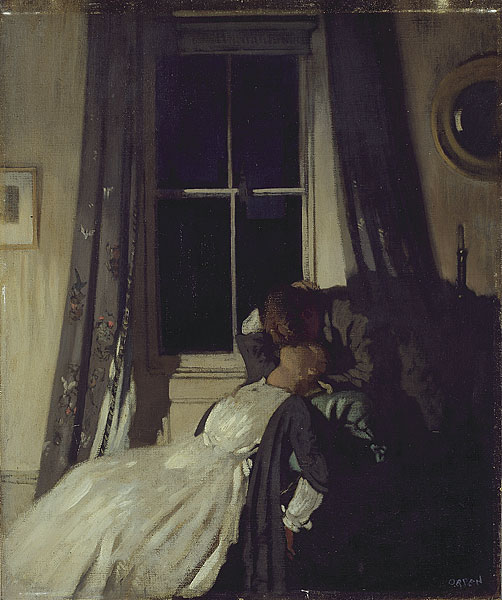
William Orpen, Night No. 2, 1907

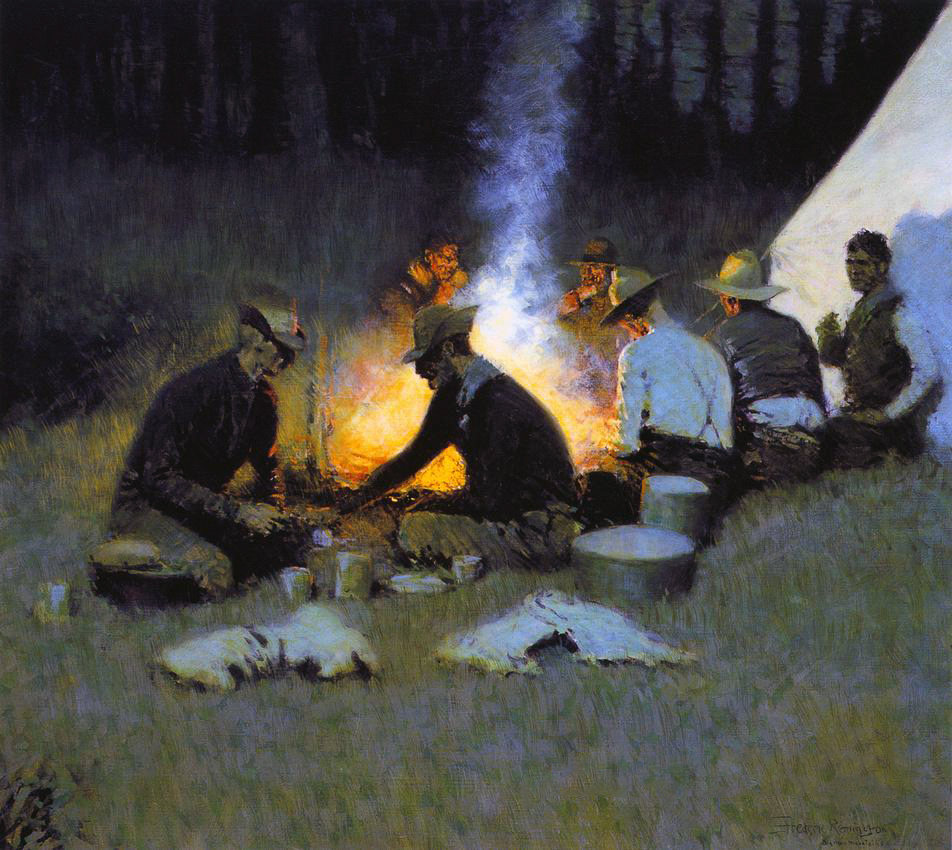
Frederic Remington, The Hunters' Supper, c. 1909, National Cowboy & Western Heritage Museum, Oklahoma City, Oklahoma

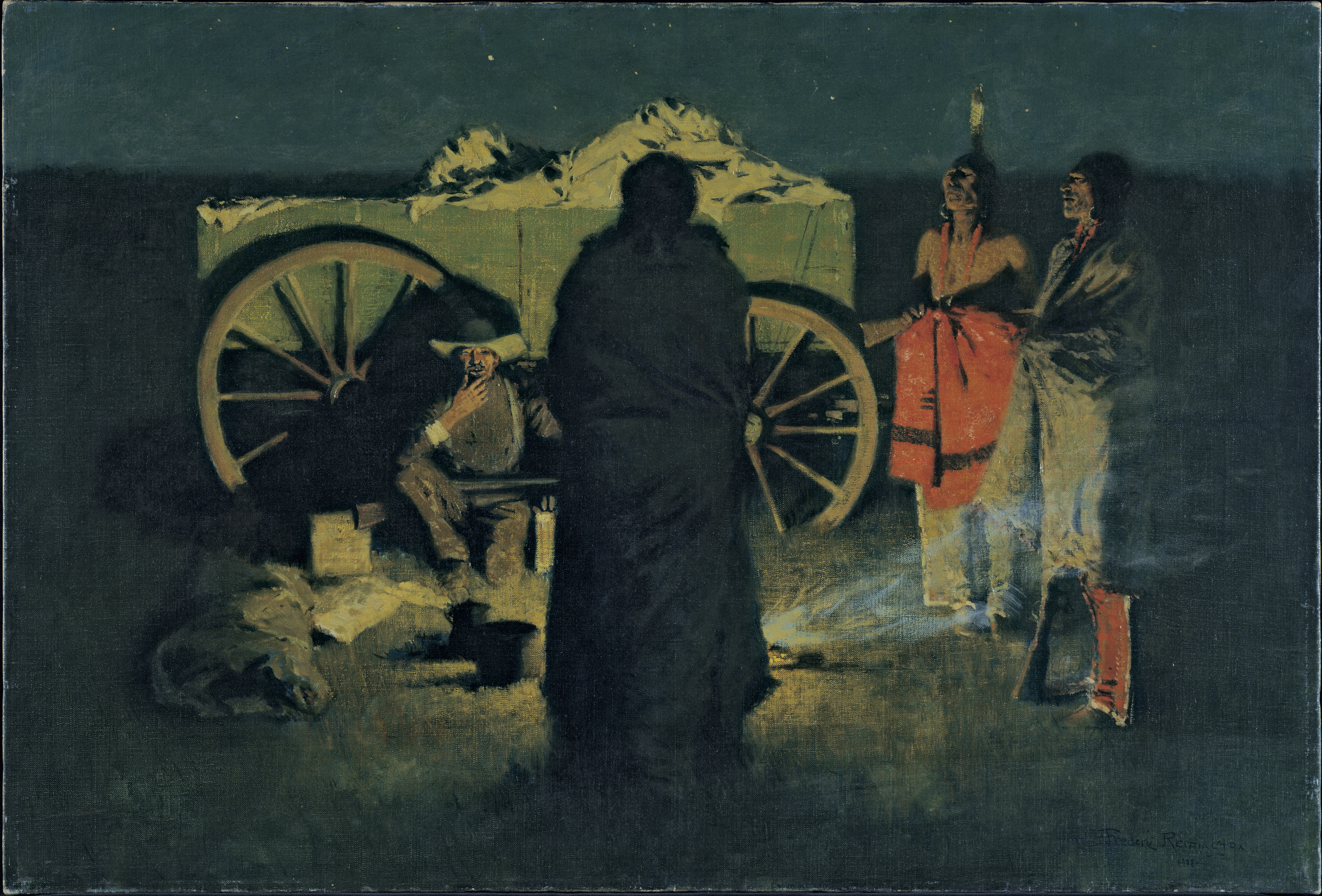
Frederic Remington, Shotgun Hospitality 1908, Hood Museum of Art, Dartmouth College, Hanover, New Hampshire

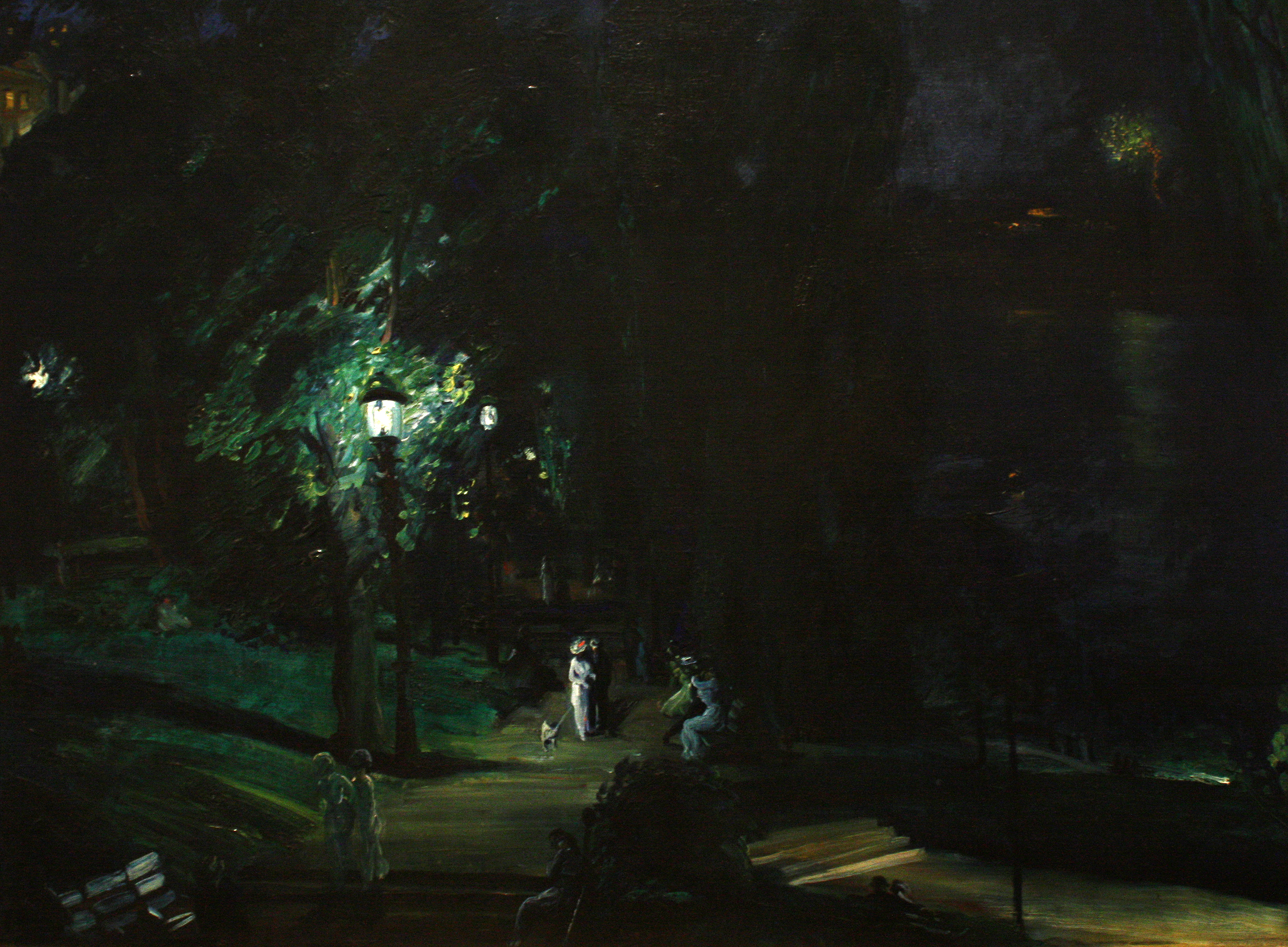
George Bellows, Summer Night, Riverside Drive, 1909

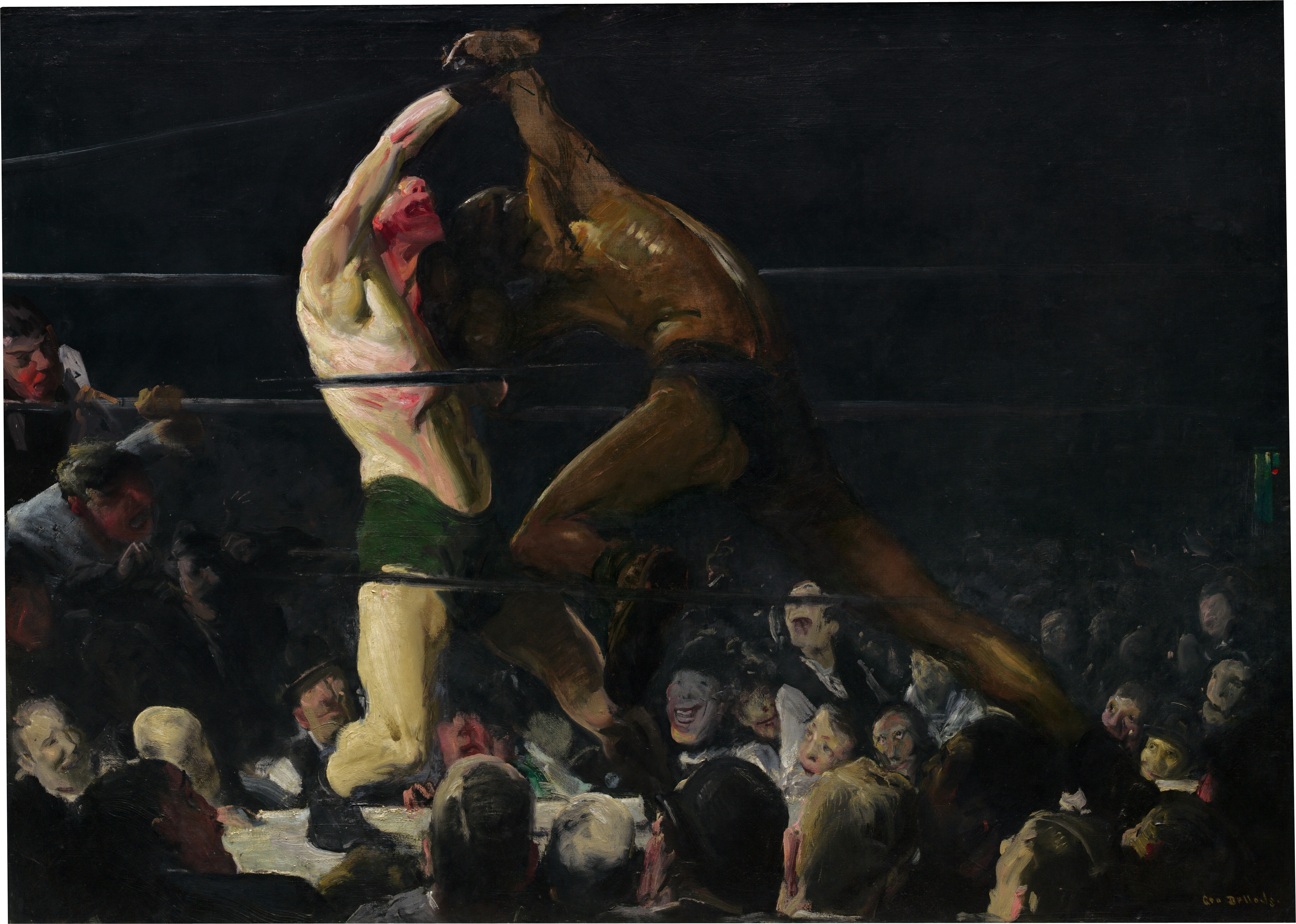
George Bellows, Both Members of This Club 1909, National Gallery of Art

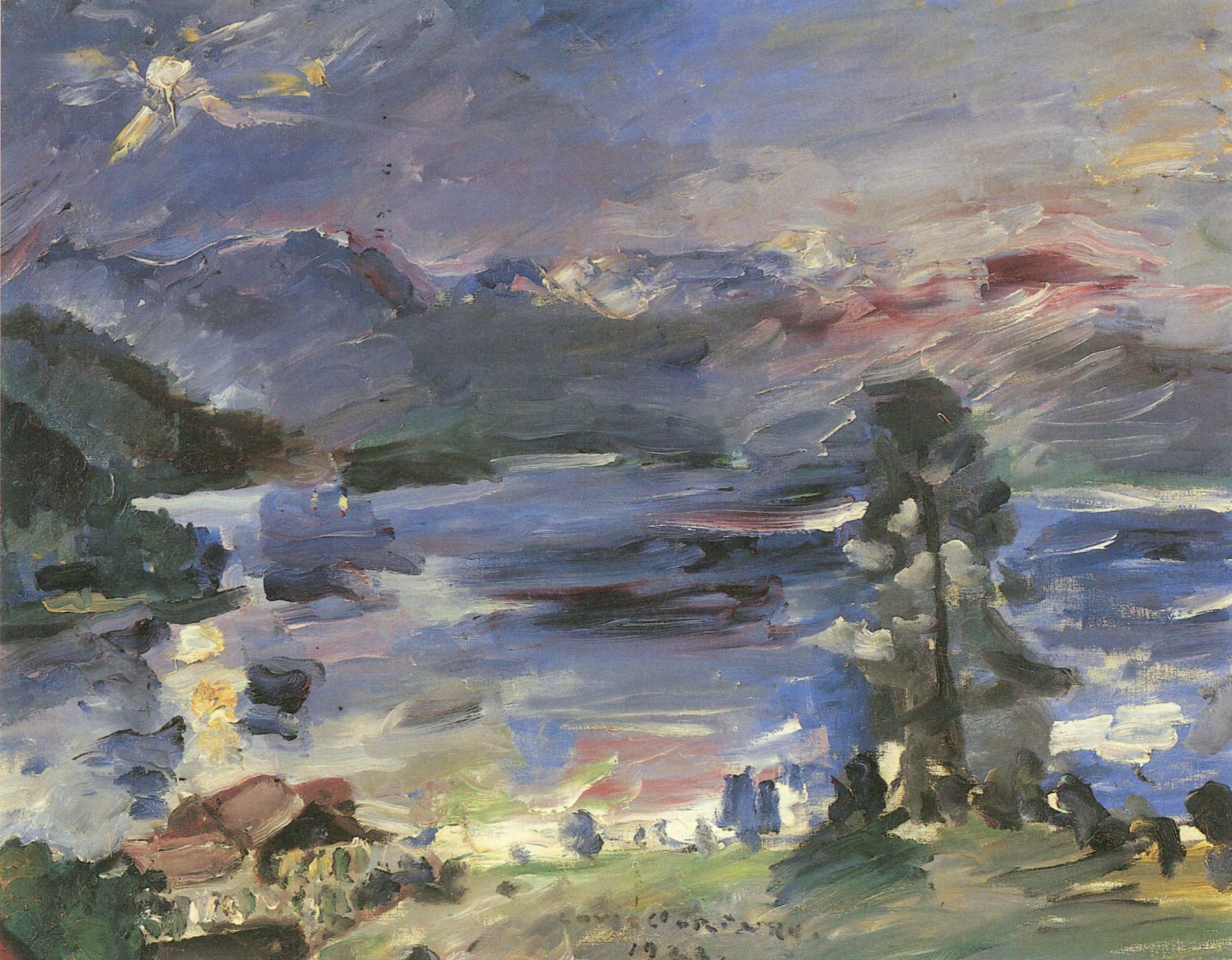
Lovis Corinth, Rising Moon, 1922

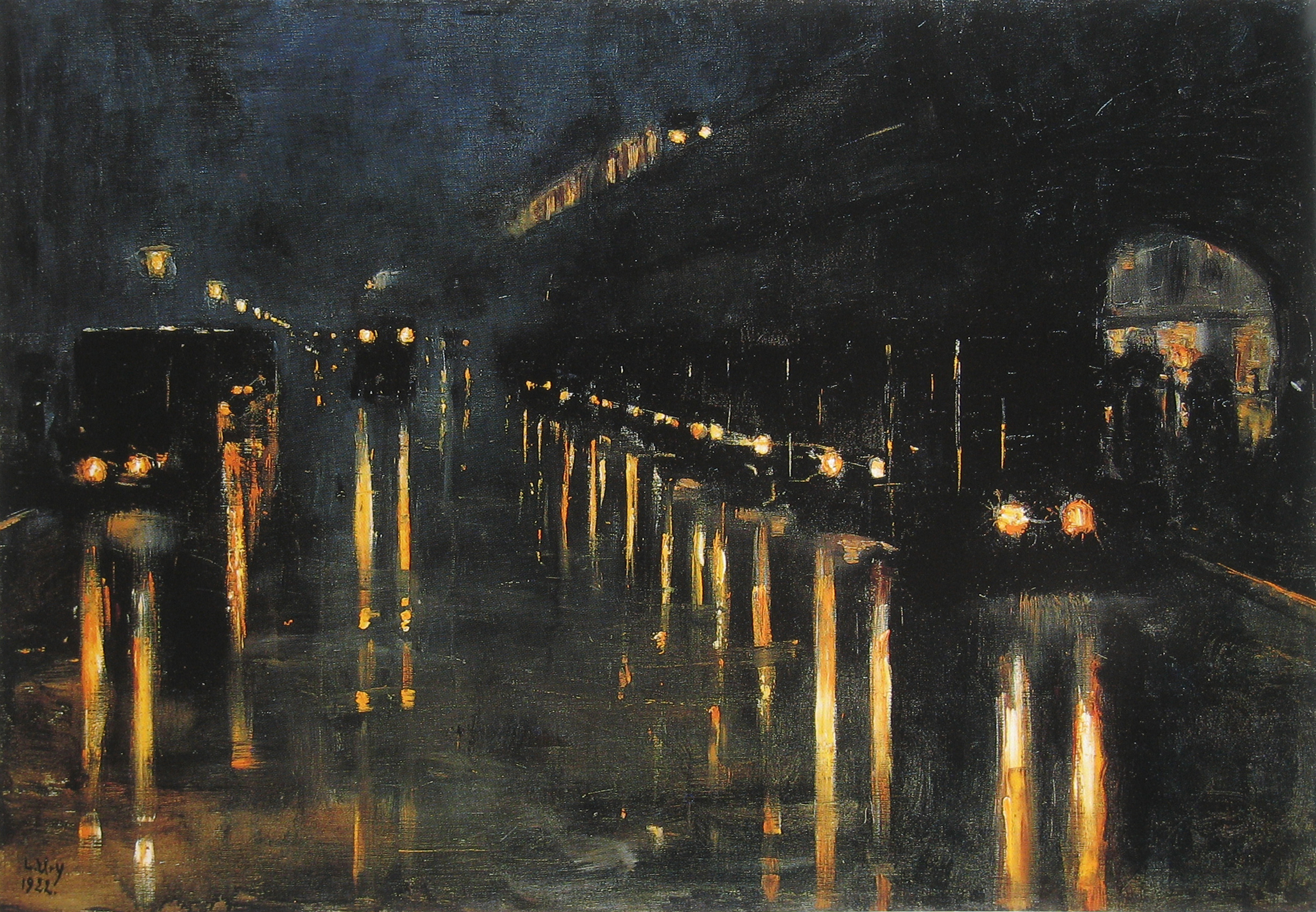
Lesser Ury, Hochbahnhof Bülowstraße, 1922

==== Frederic Remington's nocturnes ====
Frederic Remington (1861–1909) is so identified for his nocturne scenes of the American Old West that they were celebrated in 2003–2004 with an exhibition, Frederic Remington: The Color of Night, co-organized and shown in turn by the National Gallery of Art, Washington, D.C., and the Gilcrease Museum, Tulsa, Oklahoma. The exhibition also generated a colorful book of the same title and travelled to the Denver Art Museum in Denver, Colorado. Remington painted many of his nocturnes in the last years of his life, when he was transitioning from a career as an illustrator to that of a fine artist and had chosen Impressionism as the style in which he worked at the time. One example of his work is The Stampede (also known as The Stampede by Lightning, 1908).

Frederic Remington, Sunset on the Plains, 1905–1906, is representative of his late Impressionistic style. The painting is in the West Point Museum Collection, United States Military Academy, New York.

The paintings pictured in the gallery below are in order of date completed, left to right:

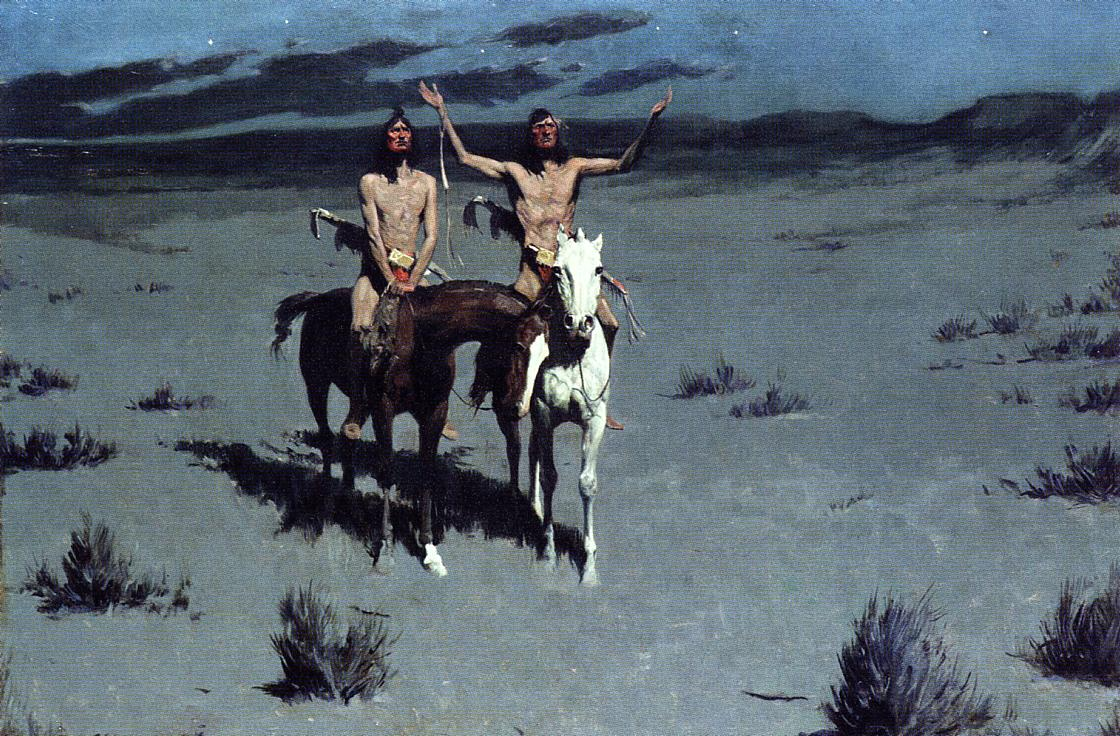
Pretty Mother of the Night—White Otter is No Longer a Boy c. 1900, private collection

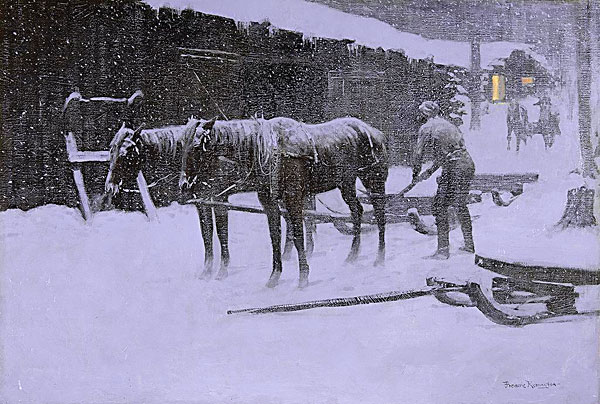
The End of the Day c. 1904, Frederic Remington Art Museum, Ogdensburg, New York

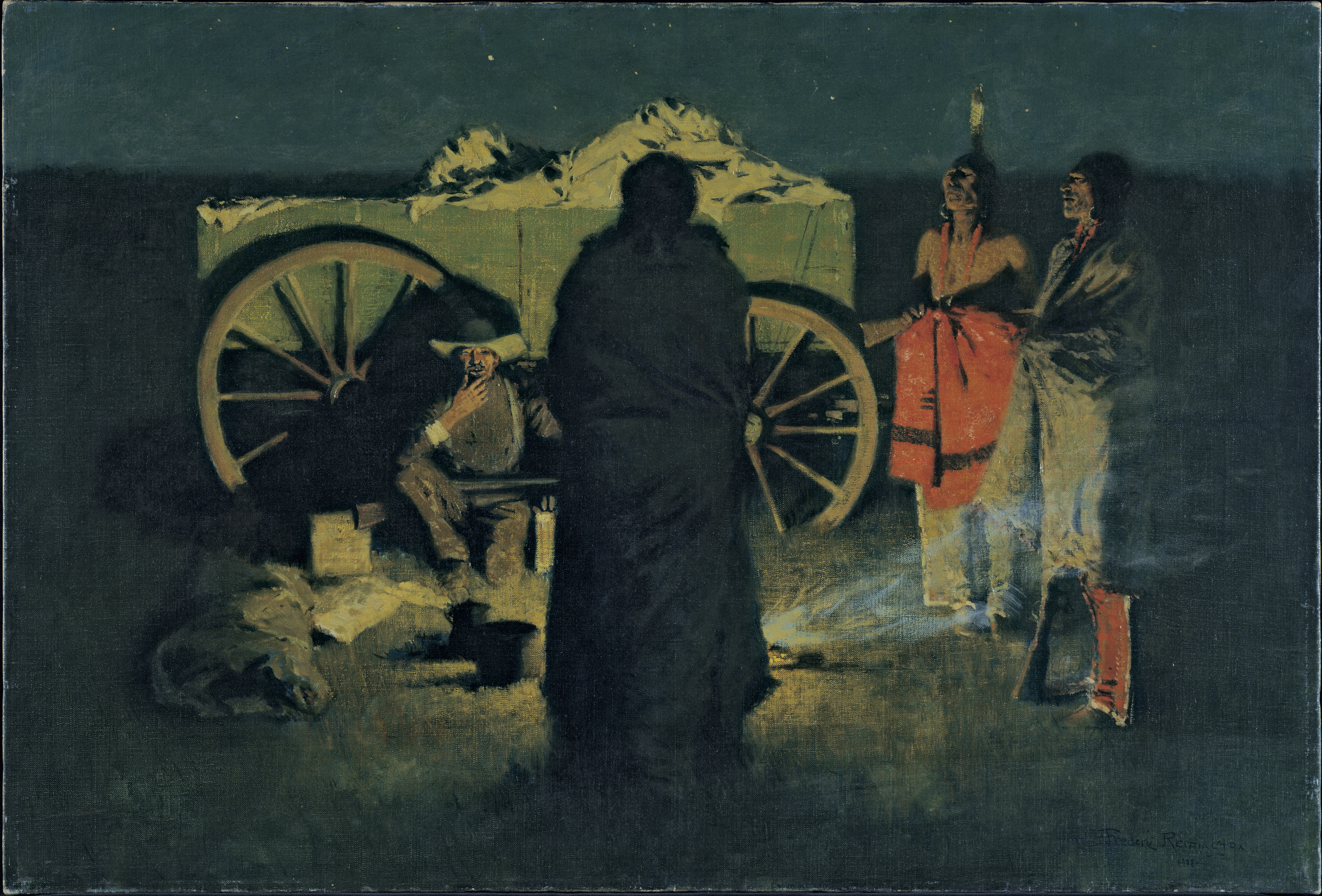
Shotgun Hospitality 1908, Hood Museum of Art, Dartmouth College, Hanover, New Hampshire

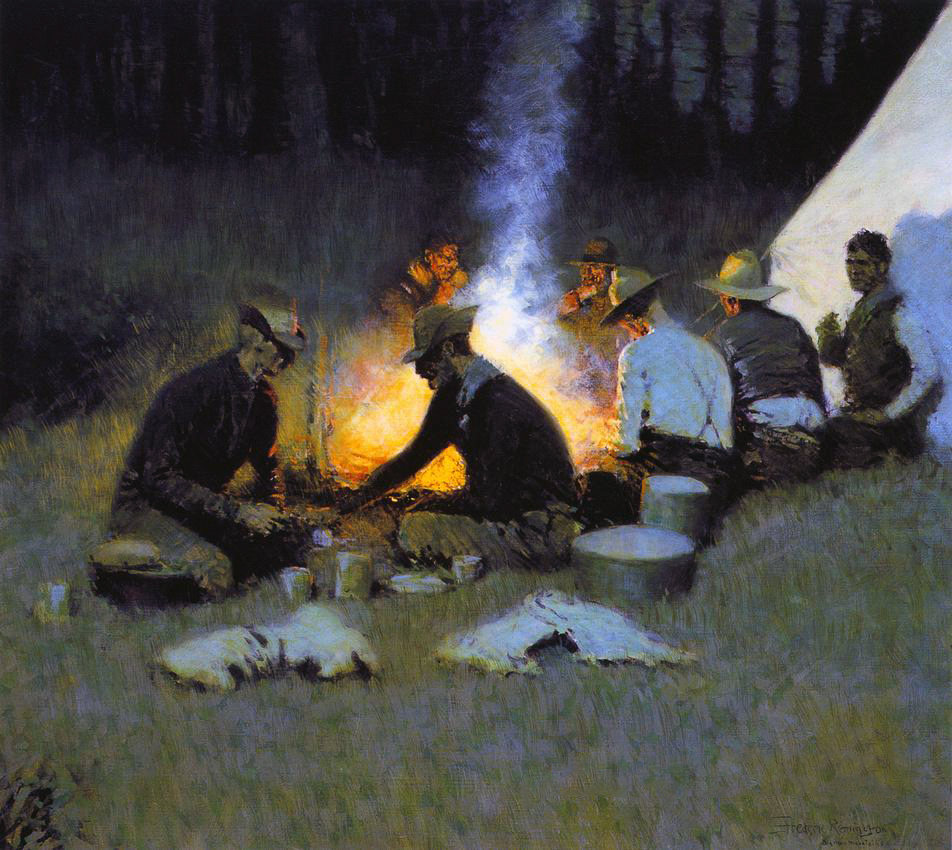
The Hunters' Supper c. 1909, National Cowboy & Western Heritage Museum, Oklahoma City, Oklahoma

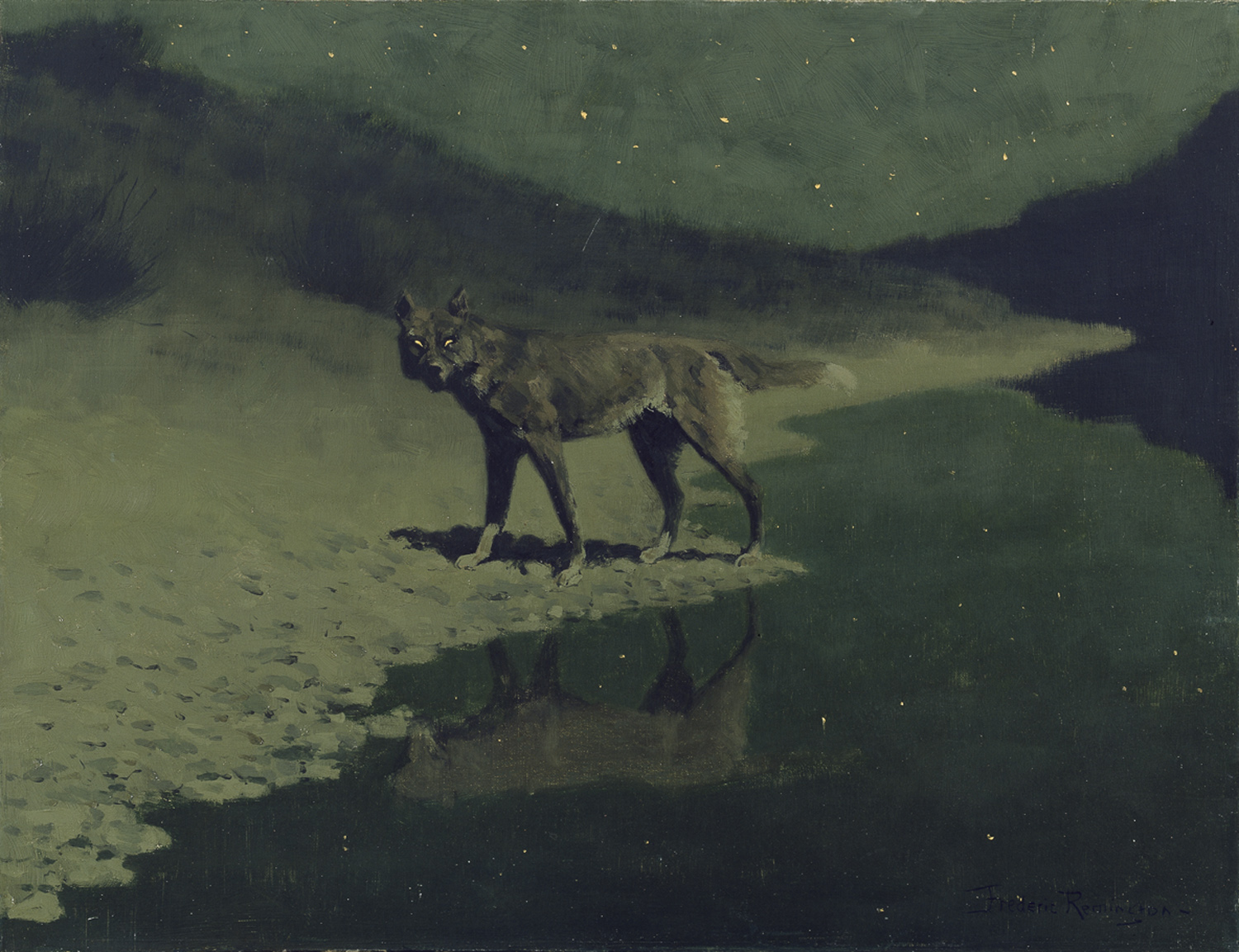
Moonlight Wolf c. 1909, Addison Gallery of American Art, Andover, Massachusetts

== American Impressionists and other American Realists ==
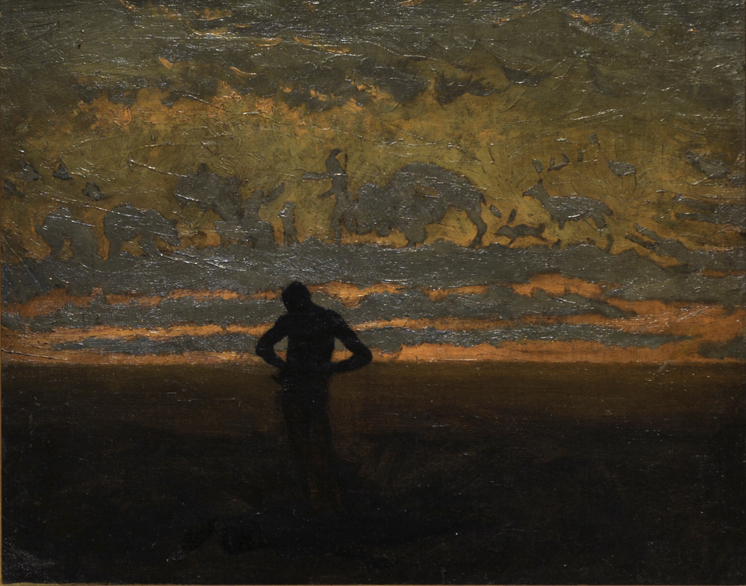
Thomas Eakins, Hiawatha, 1870,

Robert Henri, Snow in New York 1902, exemplifies an urban nocturne by an American Realist, National Gallery of Art, Washington, D.C.

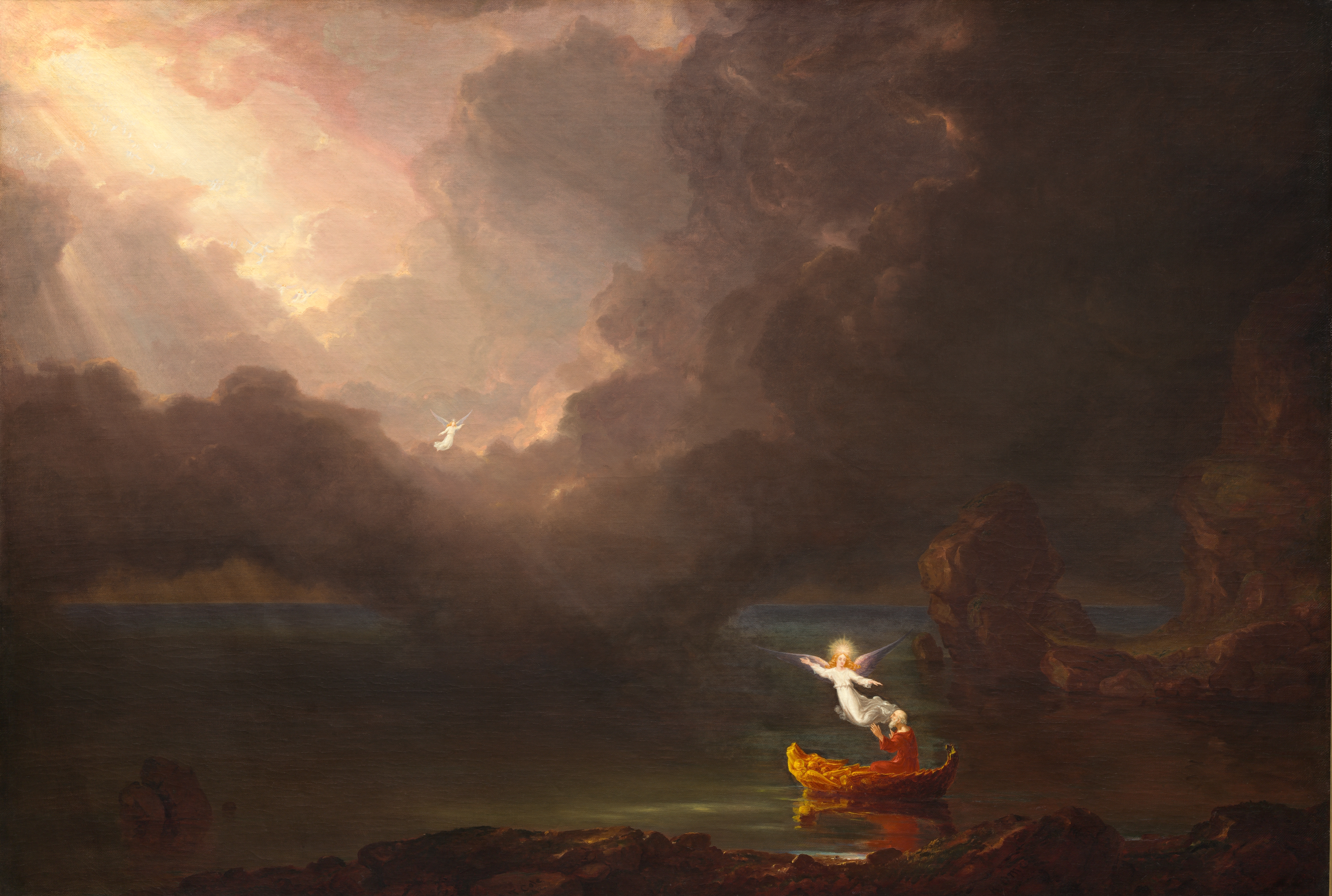
Thomas Cole, The Voyage of Life, Old Age, 1842, National Gallery of Art

- Thomas Cole (1801–1848), Moonlight (1833–34)
- George Inness (1825–1894), Pool in the Woods, 1892, Worcester Art Museum, Worcester, Massachusetts
- John Henry Twachtman (1853–1902), Canal Venice c. 1878, private collection
- John Henry Twachtman (1853–1902), L'Etang c. 1884, private collection
- Albert Pinkham Ryder (1847–1917), Death on a Pale Horse (The Race Track) c. 1910, The Cleveland Museum of Art, Ohio
- Frank Tenney Johnson (1874–1939), Rough Riding Rancheros c. 1933
- Edward Hopper (1882–1967), Nighthawks, 1942, Art Institute of Chicago, Chicago, Illinois
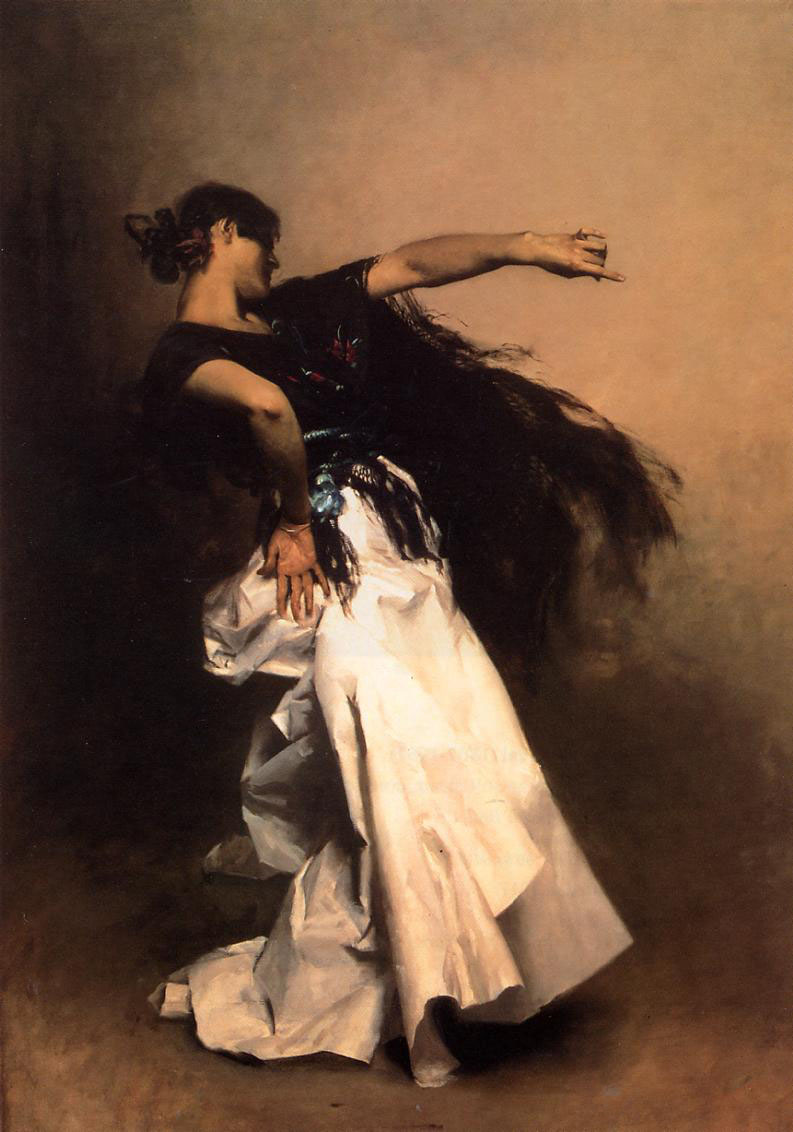
John Singer Sargent, Spanish Dancer, 1879–1880, The Hispanic Society of America, New York

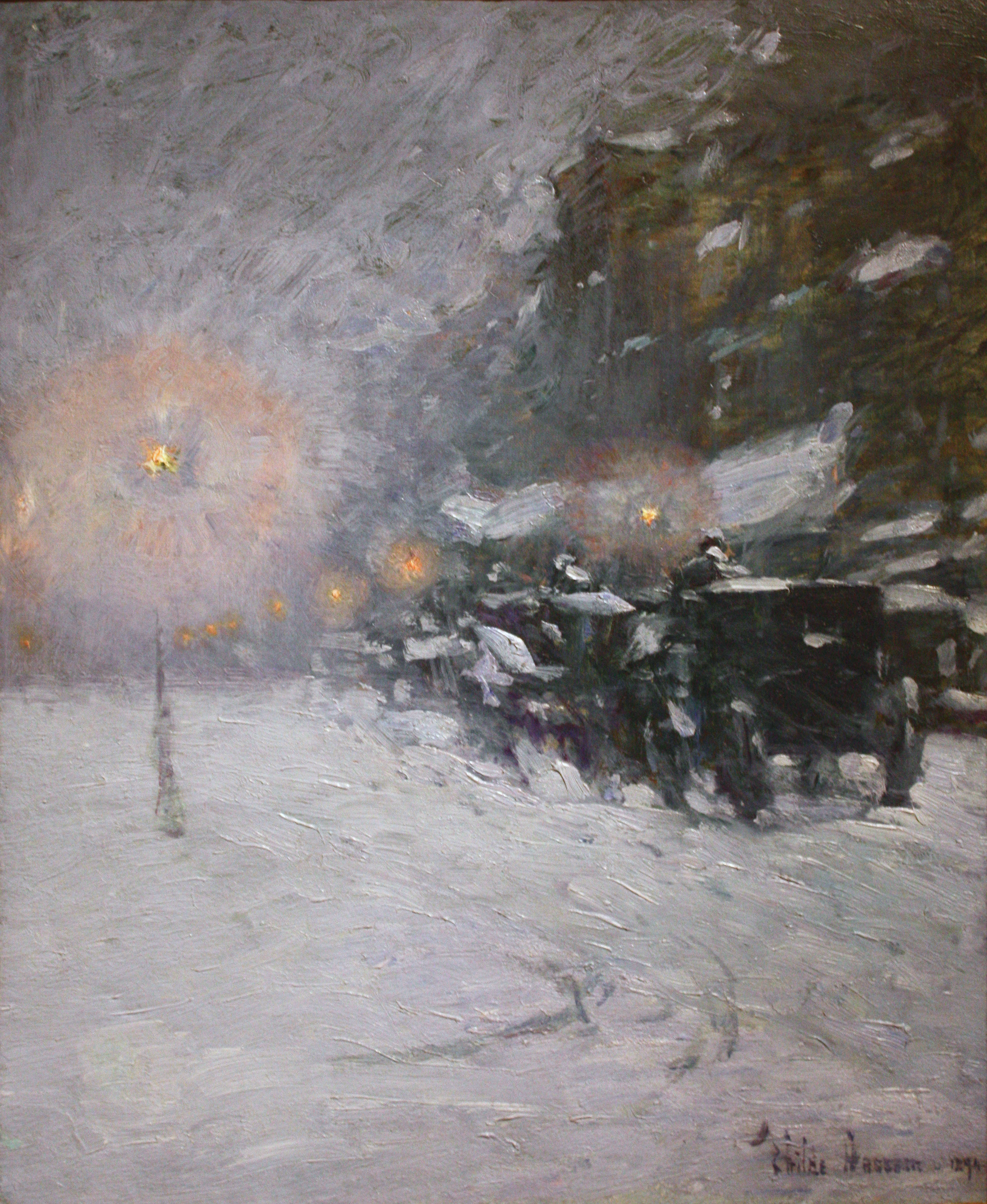
Childe Hassam, Winter, Midnight, 1894

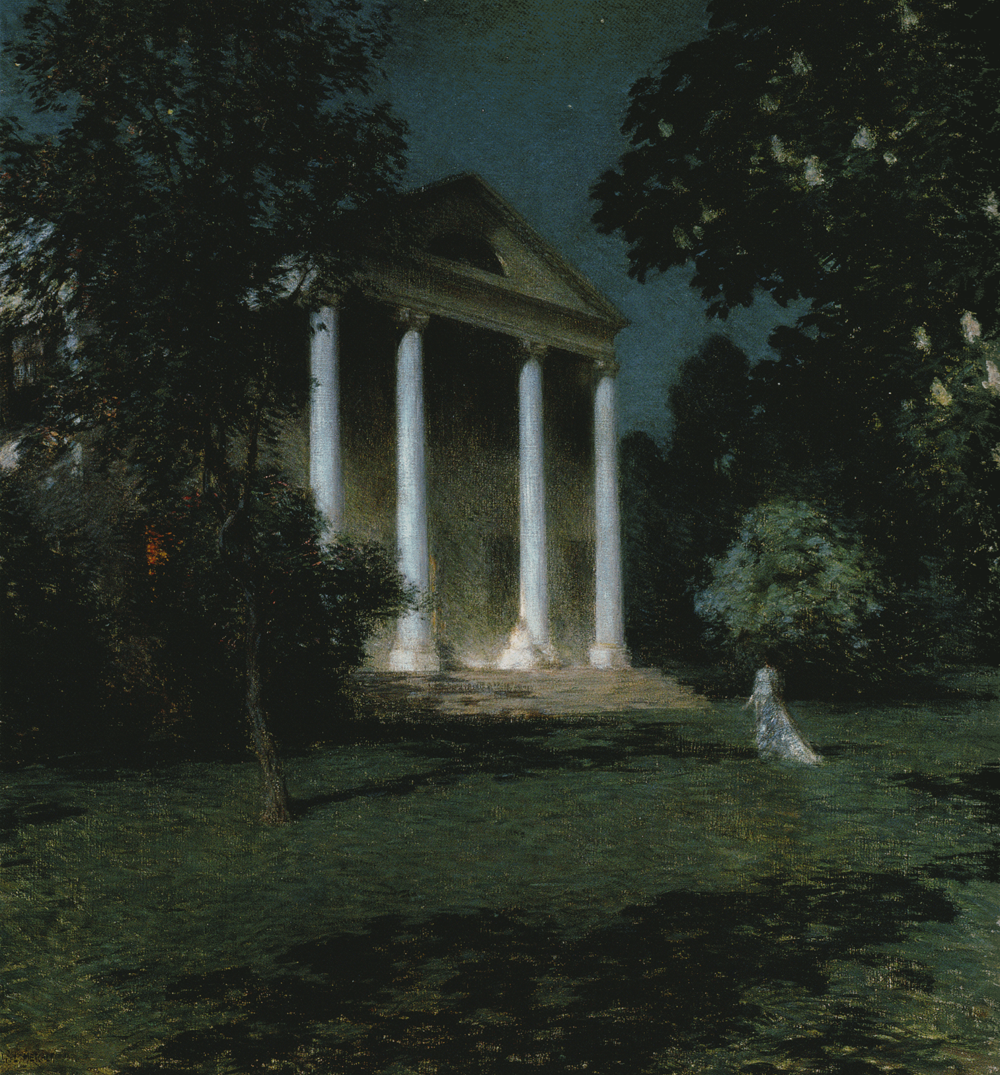
Willard Metcalf, May Night 1906, Corcoran Gallery of Art

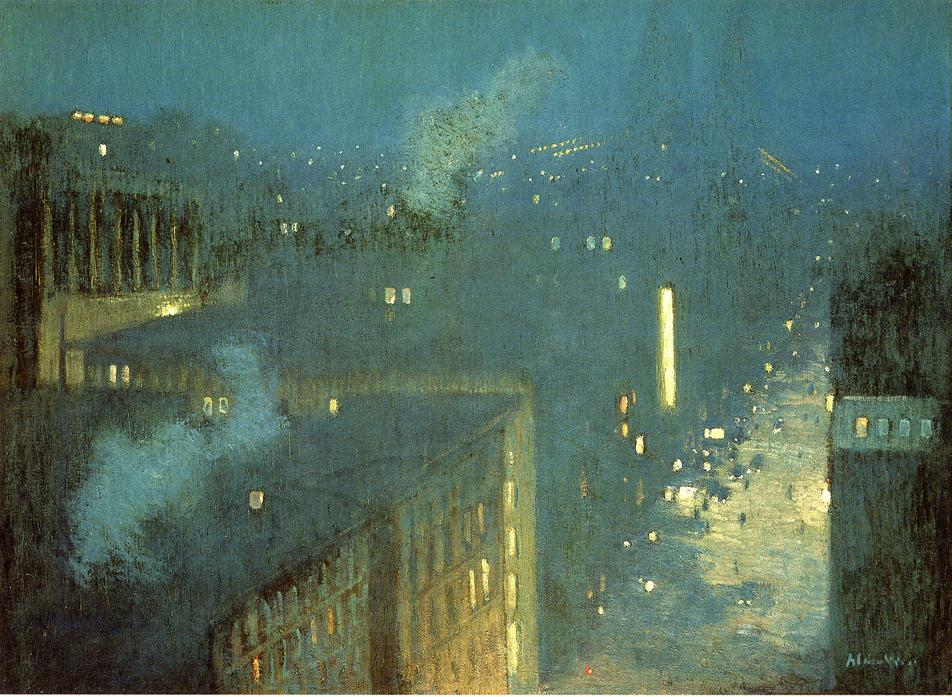
J. Alden Weir, The Bridge Nocturne aka Nocturne Queensboro Bridge, 1910, Hirshhorn Museum and Sculpture Garden

== Artists of other movements ==
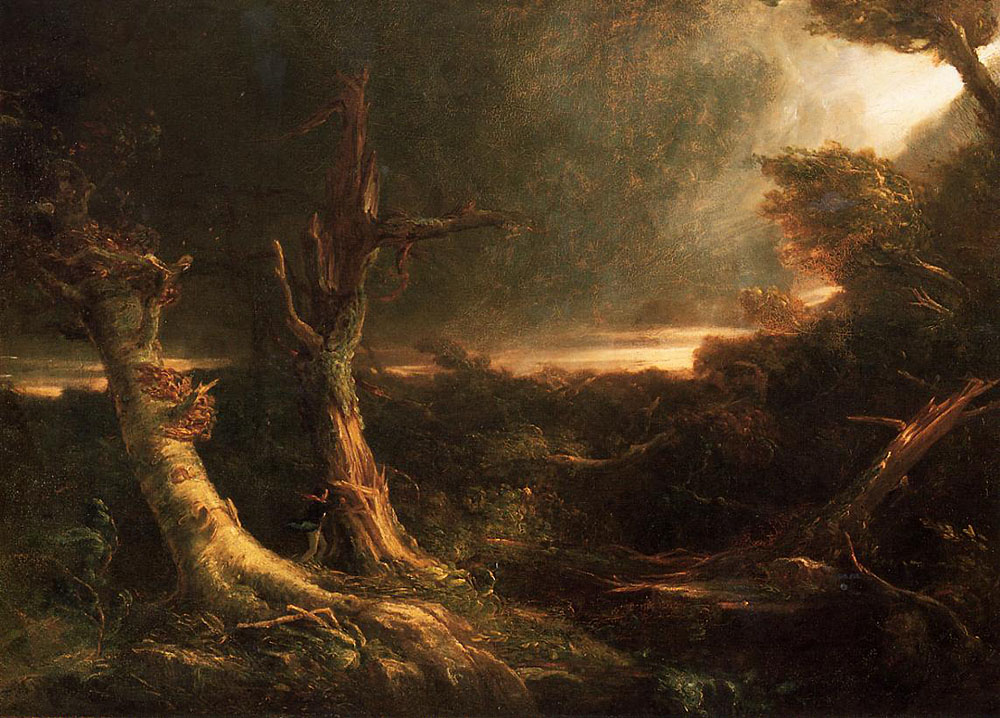
Thomas Cole, The Tornado 1835. The founder of the Hudson River group of landscape painters in 1825, which dominated the landscape movement in America until the 1870s

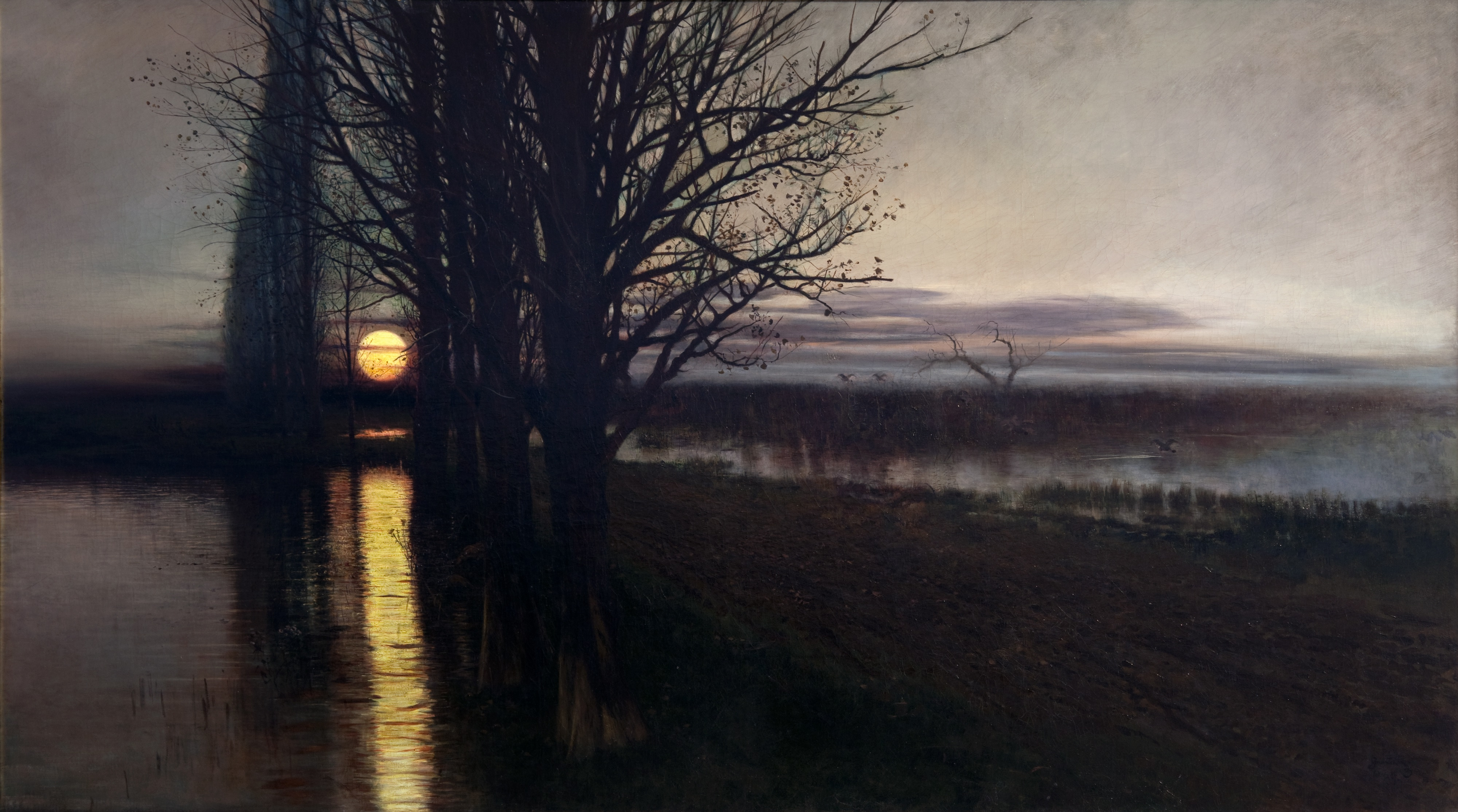
Stanisław Masłowski, Polish landscape painter - Moonrise, 1884, Oil on canvas, National Museum, Kraków, Sukiennice Museum div.

Other artists who also created nocturne scenes are:

- Jacob van Ruisdael (1628–1682), Landscape with Church (circa 1660)]
- Jacob van Ruisdael, Landscape (circa 1665)
- Augustus Leopold Egg (1816–1863), Past and Present Number Three (circa 1853)
- John LaFarge (1835–1920), The Lady of Shalott (1862)
- Edgar Degas (1834–1917), Interior (nicknamed The Rape) (1868–69), Philadelphia Museum of Art
- Vincent van Gogh (1853–1890), Starry Night Over the Rhone (1888)

== Famous examples ==
Rembrandt, The Night Watch or The Militia Company of Captain Frans Banning Cocq, 1642, Rijksmuseum, Amsterdam

Francisco Goya, The Third of May 1808, 1814

Vincent van Gogh, The Starry Night, 1889, Museum of Modern Art, New York

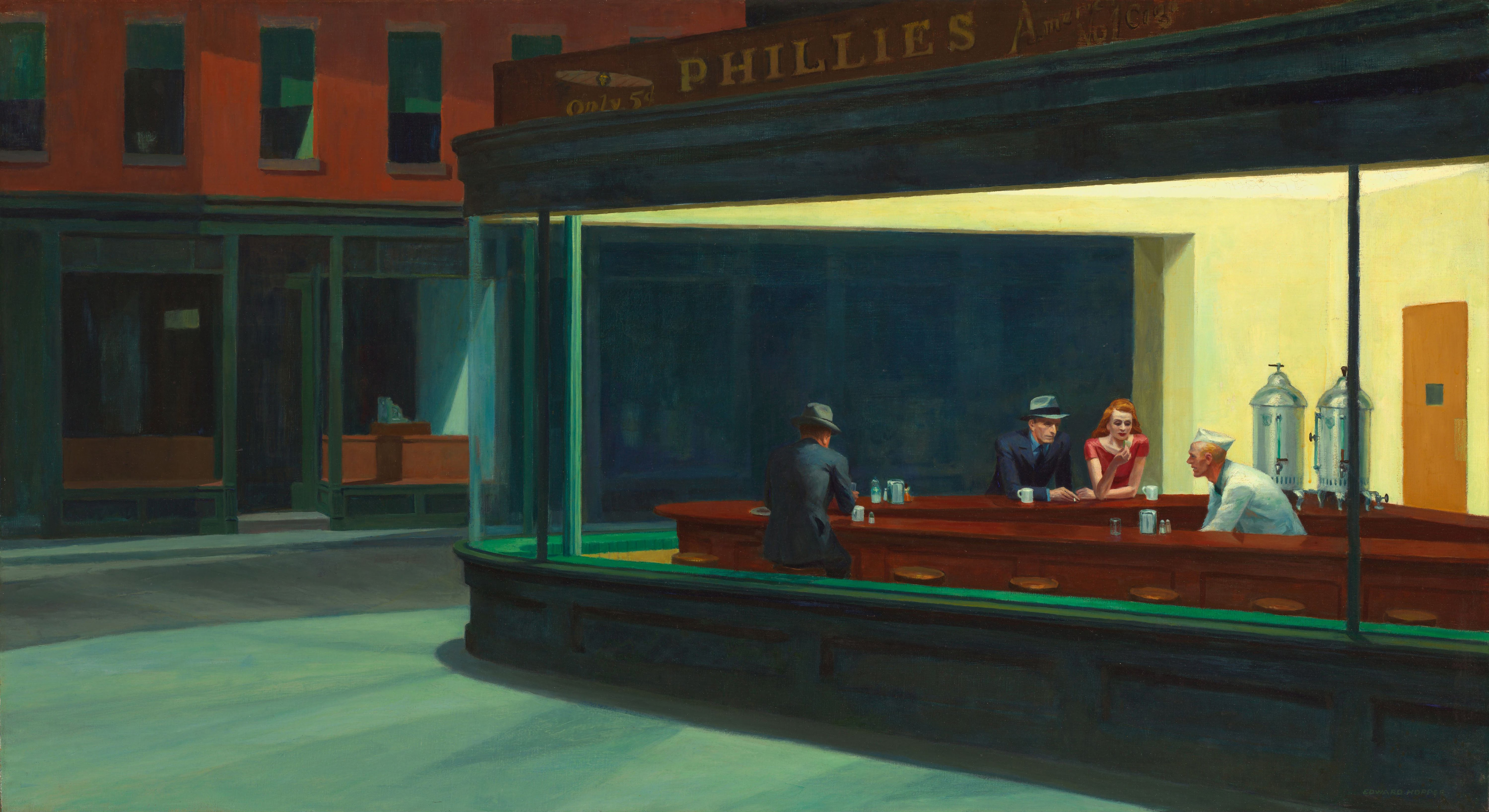
Edward Hopper, Nighthawks, 1942, Art Institute of Chicago, Chicago, Illinois

René Magritte, The Empire of Light, c. 1950, Museum of Modern Art

=== The Night Watch, Rembrandt van Rijn ===
The Night Watch or The Shooting Company of Frans Banning Cocq by Dutch painter Rembrandt van Rijn is one of the most famous paintings in the world. One of its key elements is the effective use of light and shadow (chiaroscuro). Made in 1642, it depicts the eponymous company moving out, led by Captain Frans Banning Cocq (dressed in black, with a red sash) and his lieutenant, Willem van Ruytenburch (dressed in yellow, with a white sash). With effective use of sunlight and shade, Rembrandt leads the eye to the three most important characters among the crowd, the two gentlemen in the centre (from whom the painting gets its original title), and the small girl in the centre left background.

For much of its existence, the painting was coated with a dark varnish which gave the incorrect impression that it depicted a night scene, leading to the name by which it is now commonly known. The heavy varnish was only discovered in the 1940s and restoration began after 1975.

=== The Third of May 1808, Francisco Goya ===
The Third of May 1808 by Spanish painter Francisco Goya commemorates Spanish resistance to Napoleon's armies during the occupation of 1808 in the Peninsular War. The painting's content, presentation, and emotional force secure its status as a groundbreaking, archetypal image of the horrors of war. Although it draws on many sources from both high and popular art, The Third of May 1808 marks a clear break from convention. Diverging from the traditions of Christian art and traditional depictions of war, it has no distinct precedent, and is acknowledged as one of the first paintings of the modern era. According to the art historian Kenneth Clark, The Third of May 1808 is "the first great picture which can be called revolutionary in every sense of the word, in style, in subject, and in intention".

It is set in the early hours of the morning following the uprising and centers on two masses of men: one a rigidly poised firing squad, the other a disorganized group of captives held at gun point. Executioners and victims face each other abruptly across a narrow space; according to Kenneth Clark, "by a stroke of genius [Goya] has contrasted the fierce repetition of the soldiers' attitudes and the steely line of their rifles, with the crumbling irregularity of their target." A square lantern situated on the ground between the two groups throws a dramatic light on the scene. The brightest illumination falls on the huddled victims to the left, whose numbers include a monk or friar in prayer. The central figure is the brilliantly lit man kneeling amid the bloodied corpses of those already executed, his arms flung wide in either appeal or defiance.

The painting is structurally and thematically tied to traditions of martyrdom in Christian art, as exemplified in the dramatic use of chiaroscuro, and the appeal to life juxtaposed with the inevitability of imminent execution. However, Goya's painting departs from this tradition. Works that depicted violence, such as those by Jusepe de Ribera, feature an artful technique and harmonious composition which anticipate the "crown of martyrdom" for the victim.

The lantern as a source of illumination in art was widely used by Baroque artists, and perfected by Caravaggio. Traditionally a dramatic light source and the resultant chiaroscuro were used as metaphors for the presence of God. Illumination by torch or candlelight took on religious connotations; but in The Third of May the lantern manifests no such miracle. Rather, it affords light only so that the firing squad may complete its grim work, and provides a stark illumination so that the viewer may bear witness to wanton violence. The traditional role of light in art as a conduit for the spiritual has been subverted.

=== The Starry Night, Vincent van Gogh ===
The Starry Night, made by Dutch artist Vincent van Gogh, depicts his memory of the view outside his sanatorium room window at Saint-Rémy-de-Provence (located in southern France) at night. Although Van Gogh was not very happy with the painting, art historian Joachim Pissarro cites The Starry Night as an exemplar of the artist's fascination with the nocturnal. One of Van Gogh's most popular pieces, the painting is widely hailed as his magnum opus.

=== Nighthawks, Edward Hopper ===
Edward Hopper had a lifelong interest in capturing the effect of light on the objects it touched, including the nighttime effect of artificial, man-made light spilling out of windows, doorways and porches. Nighthawks was probably Hopper's most ambitious essay in capturing the night-time effects of man-made light. For one thing, the diner's plate-glass windows cause significant light to spill out onto the sidewalk and the brownstones on the far side of the street. As well, interior light comes from more than a single lightbulb, with the result that multiple shadows are cast, and some spots are brighter than others as a consequence of being lit from more than one angle. Across the street, the line of shadow caused by the upper edge of the diner window is clearly visible towards the top of the painting. These windows, and the ones below them as well, are partly lit by an unseen streetlight, which projects its own mix of light and shadow. As a final note, the bright interior light causes some of the surfaces within the diner to be reflective. This is clearest in the case of the right-hand edge of the rear window, which reflects a vertical yellow band of interior wall, but fainter reflections can also be made out, in the counter-top, of three of the diner's occupants. None of these reflections would be visible in daylight.

=== The Empire of Light, René Magritte ===
In his 1950 painting The Empire of Light, René Magritte (1898–1967), explores the illusion of night and day, and the paradox of time and light. On the top half of his canvas Magritte paints a clear blue sky and white clouds that radiate bright daytime; while on the bottom half of his canvas below the sky, he paints a street, sidewalk, trees and houses all steeped in the darkness of night. The darkened trees and darkened houses appear to be in nighttime shadows, in the middle of the night; and the sidewalk streetlight is on to guide the way. Some of the questions implied by these pictures include is it night-time? is it daytime? or is it just a painting? The Empire of Light is one of a series of paintings that René Magritte painted between 1950 and 1954 that explores his surrealist insight into illusion and reality, using night and day as his subject.

== Gallery ==
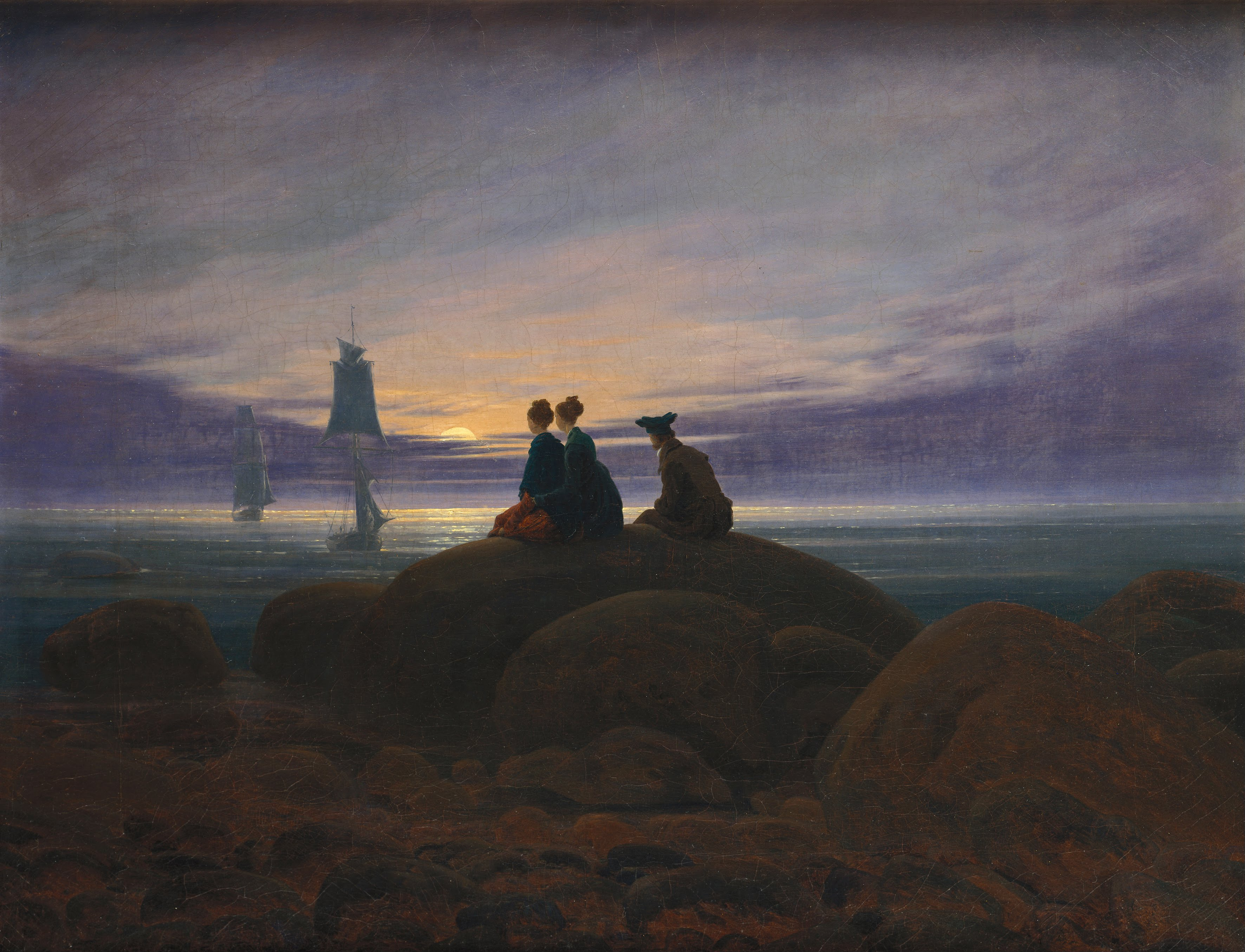
Caspar David Friedrich Moonrise over the Sea, c.1822

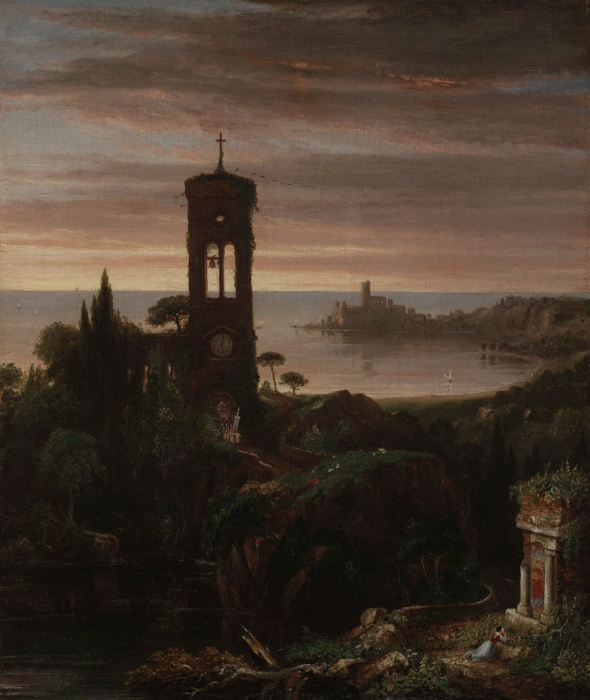
Thomas Cole, The Vesper Hymn, 1838

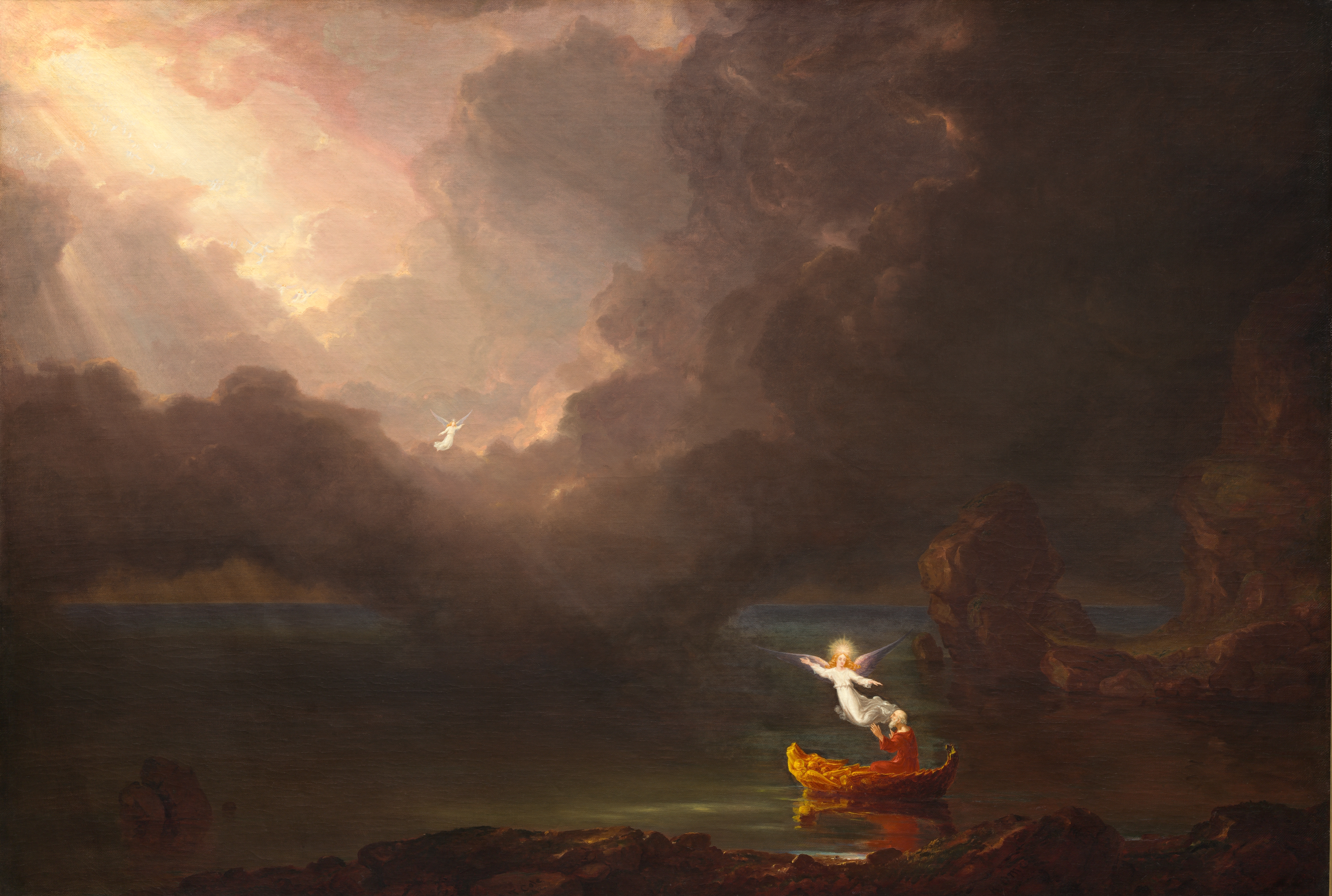
Thomas Cole, The Voyage of Life, Old Age, 1842, National Gallery of Art

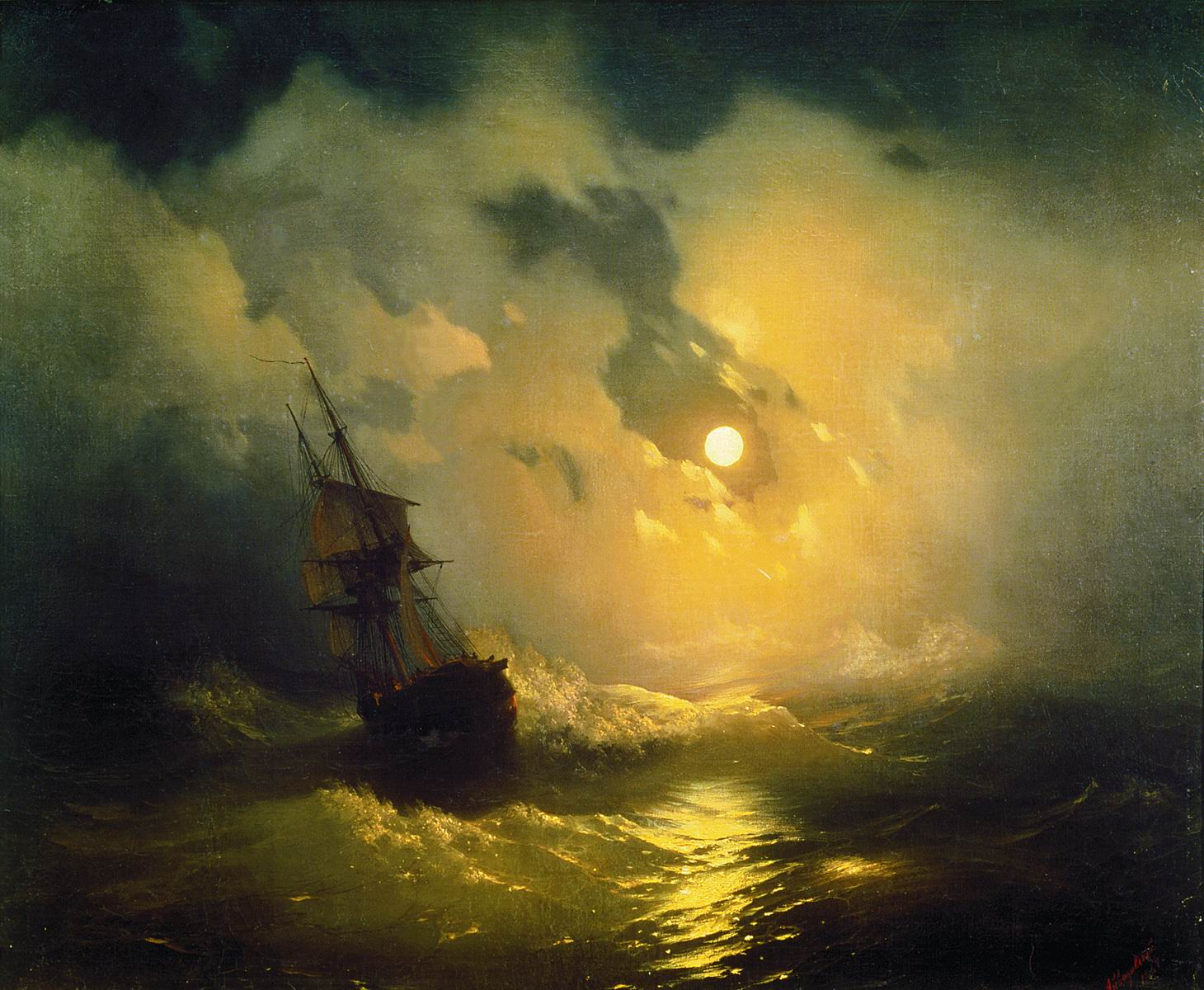
Ivan Aivazovsky, Stormy Sea in Night, 1849

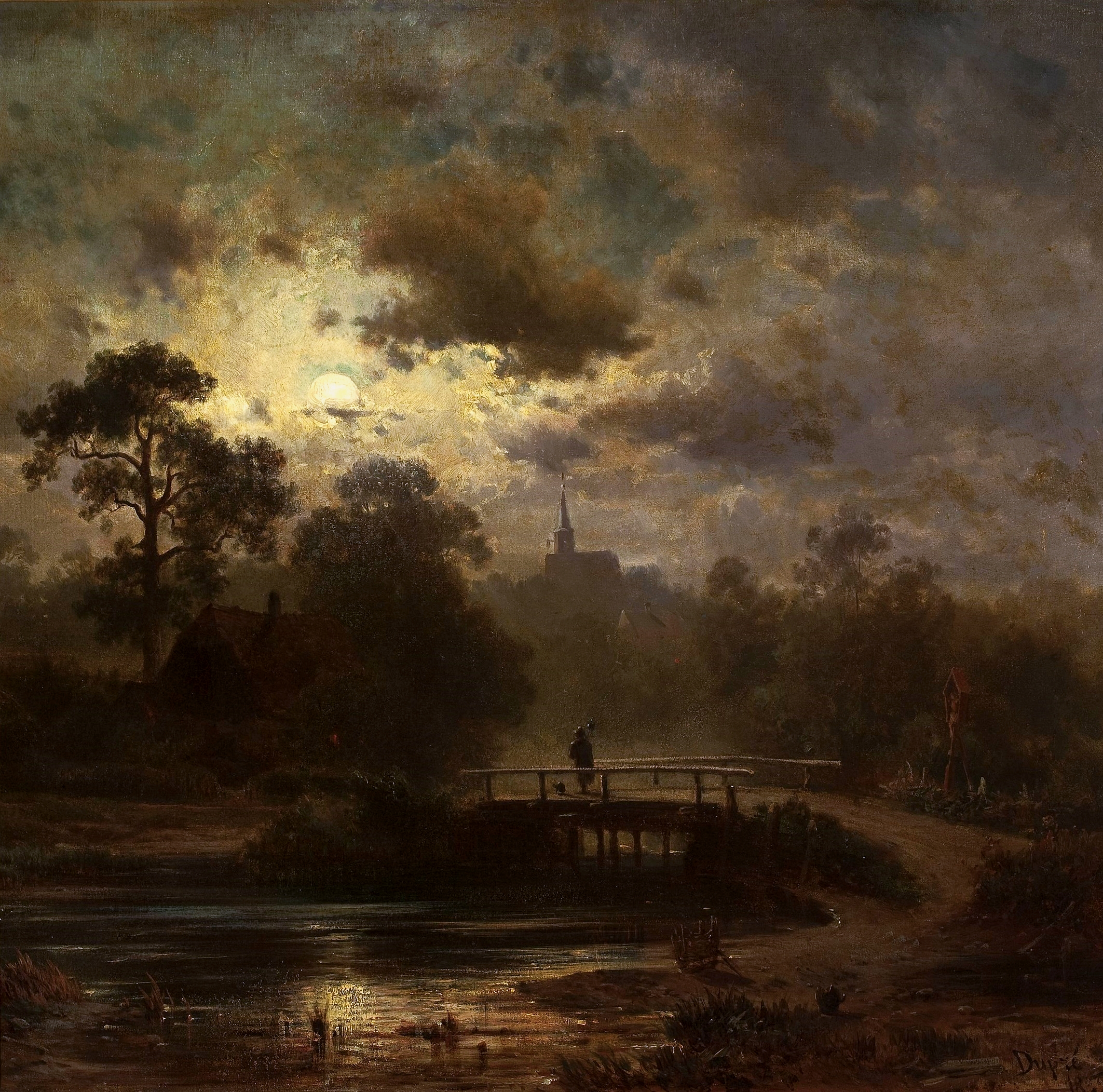
Jules Dupré, Landscape by moonlight, 1852

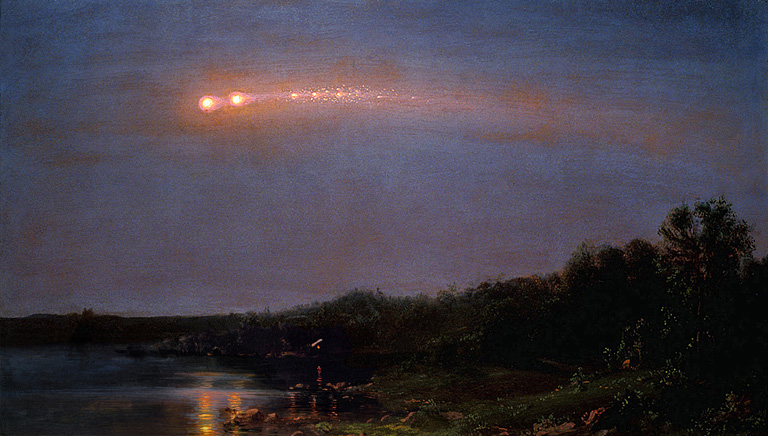
Frederic Edwin Church, Meteor of 1860, 1860

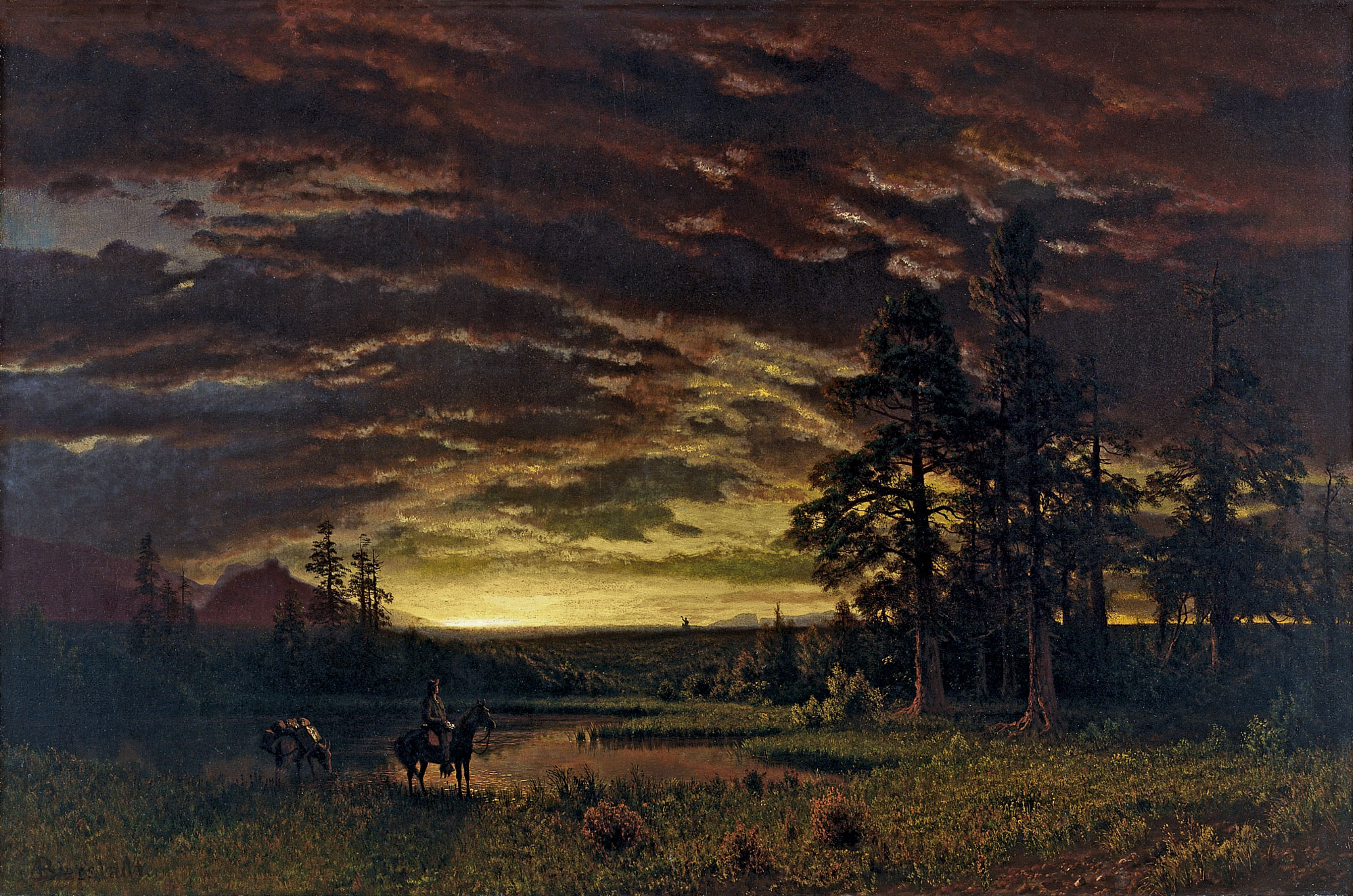
Albert Bierstadt, Evening on the Prairie, c. 1870

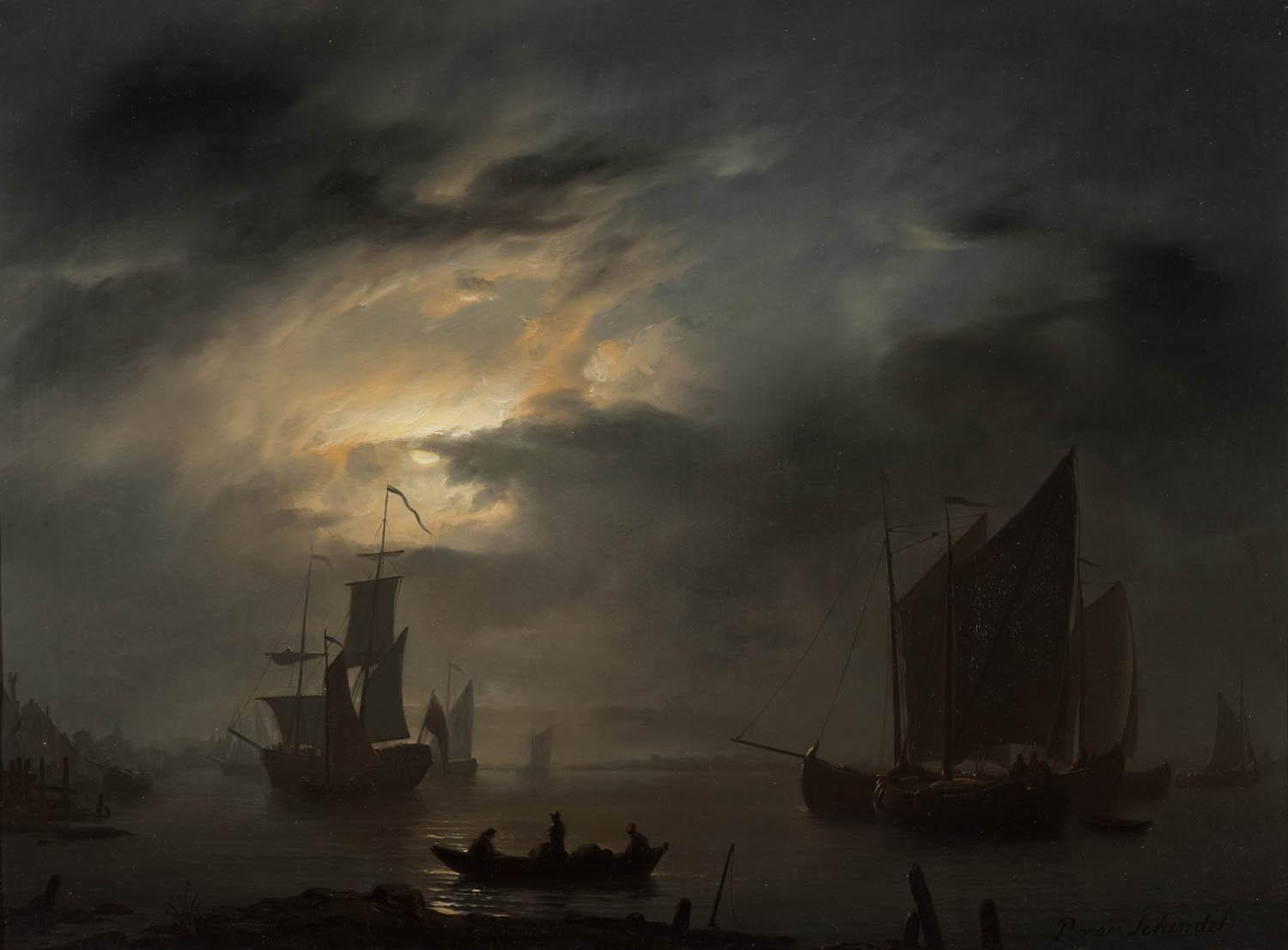
Petrus van Schendel, Nachtelijke marine, Unknown date, Collectie Rademakers

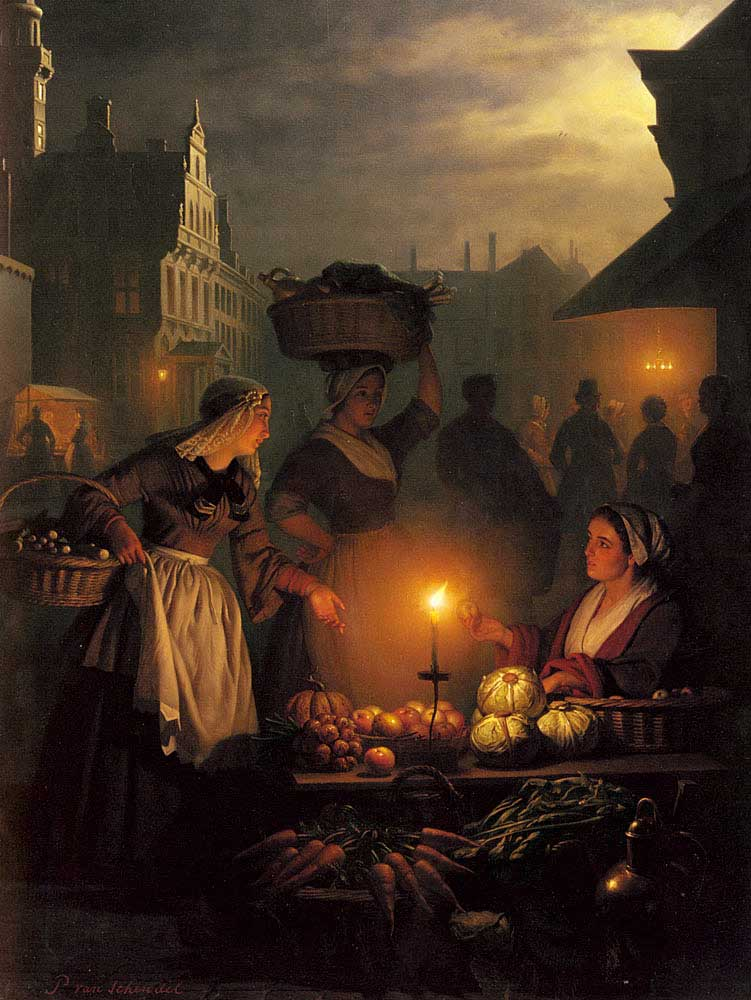
Petrus van Schendel, Market, Unknown date

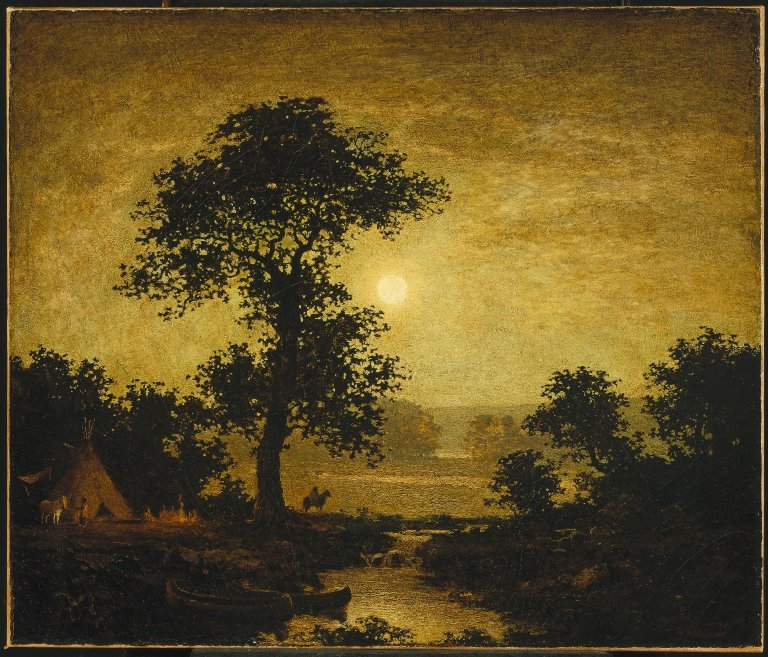
Ralph Albert Blakelock, Moonlight, 1885, Brooklyn Museum

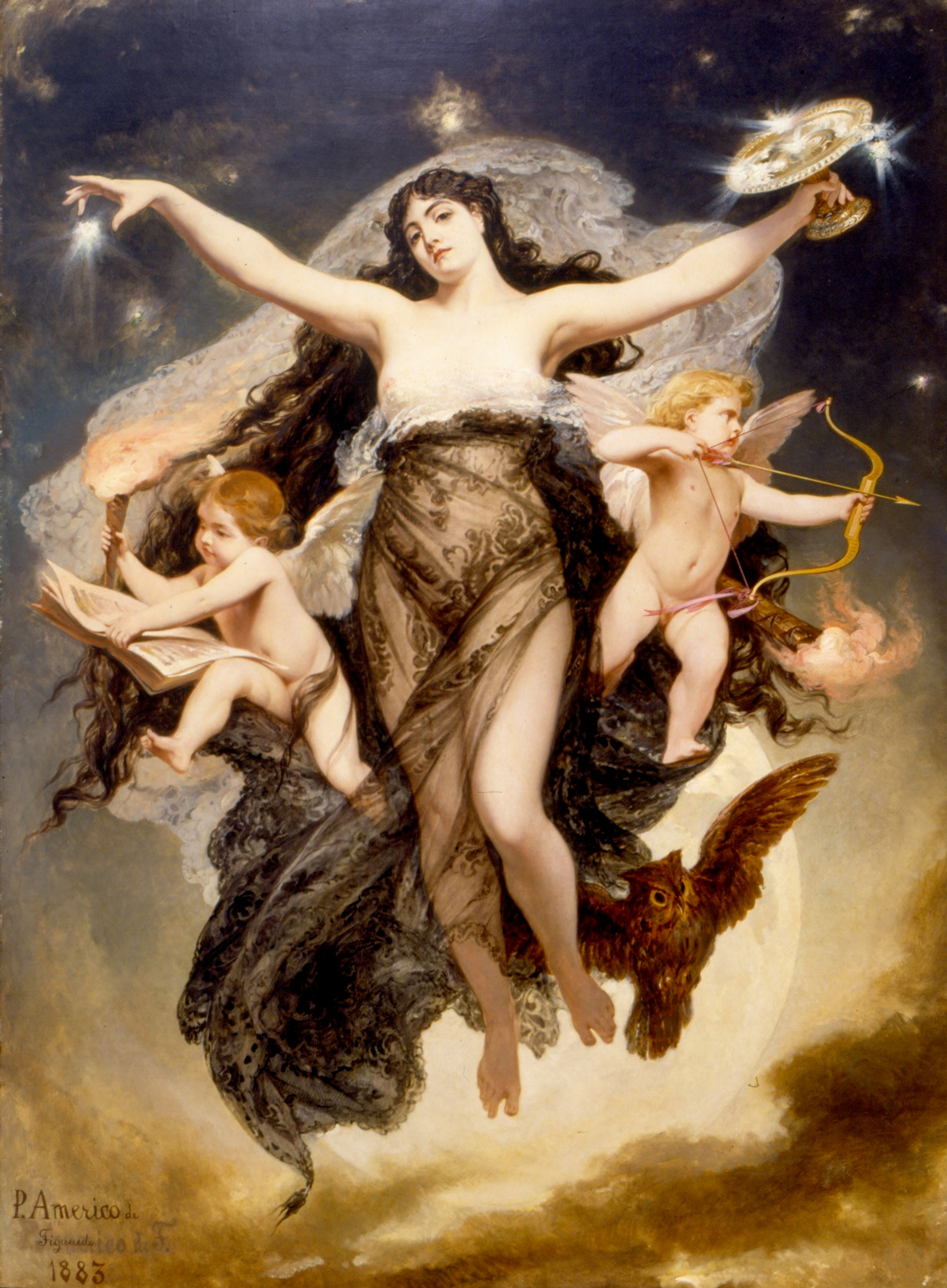
Pedro Américo, The Night Escorted by the Geniuses of Love and Study, 1886

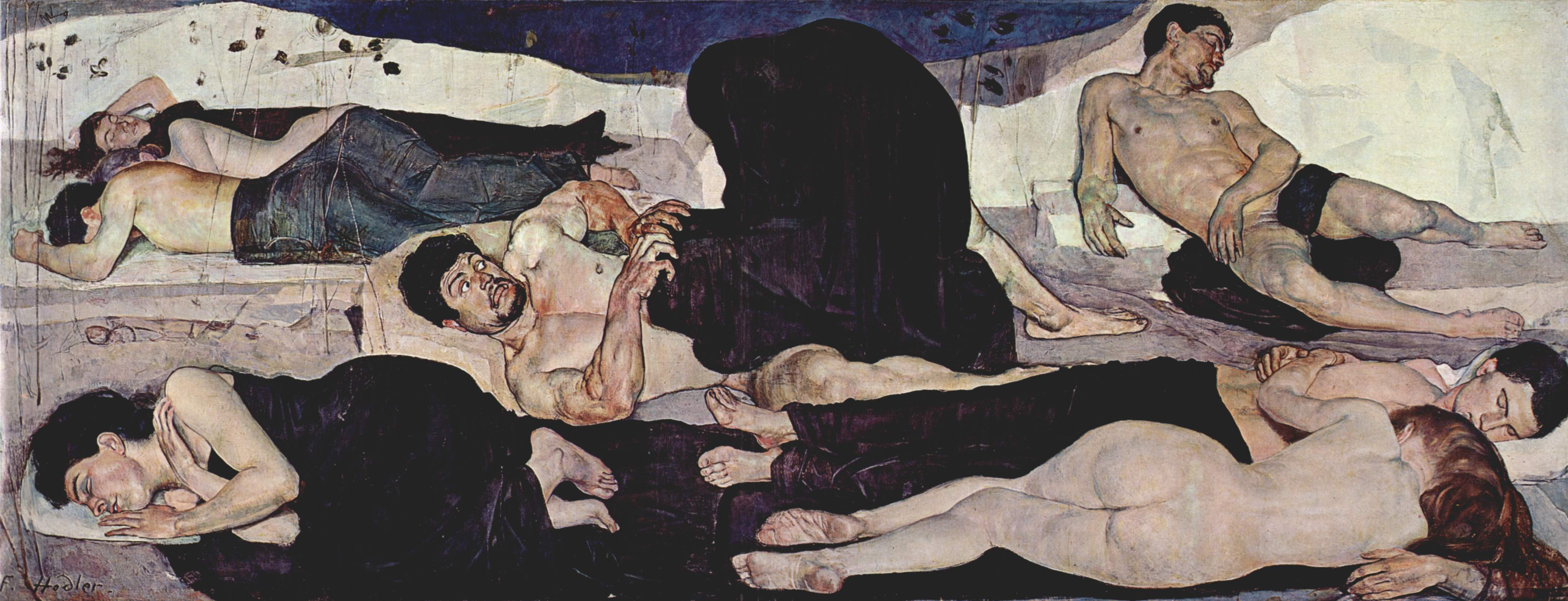
Ferdinand Hodler, The Night, 1889–1890

== See also ==
- Black Paintings
- Night in paintings (Eastern art)
- History of painting
- Night photography
- Tonalism

== Sources ==
- Anderson, Ronald and Anne Koval. (2002). James McNeill Whistler: Beyond the Myth. Da Capo Press. ISBN 0-7867-1032-2. (Note: need to verify this was the edition used.)
- Boime, Albert. (1990). Art in an Age of Bonapartism, 1800–1815. The University of Chicago Press. ISBN 0-226-06335-6.
- Blunt, Anthony. (1999) [1953]. Art and Architecture in France, 1500–1700. Yale University Press. ISBN 0-300-07748-3.
- Boka, Georges and Bernard Courteau. (1994). Rembrandt's Nightwatch : The Mystery Revealed. Georges Boka Editeur. ISBN 2-920217-41-0.
- Campbell, Lorne, National Gallery Catalogues (new series). (1998). The Fifteenth Century Netherlandish Paintings. National Gallery Publications. ISBN 1-85709-171-X.
- Clark, Kenneth. (1968). Looking at Pictures. Beacon Press. ISBN 0-8070-6689-3. (found on Artchive)
- Duffy, Jean H. (1998). Reading Between the Lines: Claude Simon and the Visual Arts. Volume 2 of Modern French Writers. Liverpool University Press. ISBN 0-85323-851-0.
- Dyos, H. J. and Michael Wolff (eds.) (1999) [1973]. The Victorian City: Images and Realities, 2 Volumes. Psychology Press. ISBN 0-415-19323-0.
- Farquhar, Maria. (1855). Biographical catalog of the principal Italian painters: with a table of the contemporary schools of Italy. Designed as a hand-book to the picture gallery. J. Murray.
- Favorite, Malaika. (1991). Illuminated Manuscript: Poems and Prints. New Orleans Poetry Journal. Journal Press Books: Louisiana Legacy. ISBN 0-938498-09-6.
- Freedberg, Sydney J. (1971). Painting in Italy, 1500–1600, first edition. The Pelican History of Art. Harmondsworth and Baltimore: Penguin Books. ISBN 0-14-056035-1.
- Gardner, Helen and Fred S. Kleiner. (2009). Gardner's Art Through the Ages: A Concise Global History. (2nd edition). Cengage Learning. ISBN 0-495-50346-0.
- Hagen, Rose-Marie and Hagen, Rainer. (28 February 2003.) What Great Paintings Say. Taschen. ISBN 3-8228-2100-4
- Henderson, Andrea and Vincent Katz. (2008). Picturing New York: The Art of Yvonne Jacquette and Rudy Burckhardt. Museum of the City of New York, Contributor. Bunker Hill Publishing. ISBN 1-59373-065-9.
- Licht, Fred. (1979). Goya: The Origins of the Modern Temper in Art. Universe Books. ISBN 0-87663-294-0
- Lambourne, Lionel. (1999). Victorian Painting. London: Phaidon Press.
- Norman, Diana. (1995). Siena, Florence and Padua: Art, Society and Religion 1280–1400, Volume II. Yale University Press. ISBN 0-300-06127-7.
- Paoletti, John T. and Gary M. Radke. (2005). Art in Renaissance Italy, 3rd edition. Laurence King Publishing. ISBN 1-85669-439-9.
- Peters, Lisa N. (1998). James McNeil Whistler. Todtri. ISBN 1-880908-70-0.
- Robertson, Alexander. (1996). Atkinson Grimshaw. London: Phaidon Press. ISBN 0-7148-2525-5.
- Schechner, Sara. (1999). Comets, Popular Culture, and the Birth of Modern Cosmology. Princeton University Press. ISBN 0-691-00925-2.
- Schiller, Gertrud. (1971). Iconography of Christian Art, Vol. I. (English trans from German), Lund Humphries, London. ISBN 0-85331-270-2.
- Steer, Isabella. (2002). The History of British Art. Bath: Parragon. ISBN 0-7525-7602-X
- Waller, Philip J. (1983). Town, City, and Nation. Oxford: Oxford University Press.
- Wood, Christopher. (1999). Victorian Painting. Boston: Little, Brown & Co.
- Zara, Christopher. (2012). Tortured Artists: From Picasso and Monroe to Warhol and Winehouse, the Twisted Secrets of the World's Most Creative Minds. Adams Media. ISBN 1-4405-3003-3.

Possible sources

- Jethani, S (2009). The Divine Commodity: Discovering a Faith Beyond Consumer Christianity. Grand Rapids, MI: Zondervan (eBook). ISBN 978-0-310-57422-4.
- Selz, Peter. (1974). German Expressionist Painting. University of California Press. ISBN 0-520-02515-6.
- Suckale, Robert and Manfred Wundram, Andreas Prater, Hermann Bauer, Eva-Gesine Baur. (2002). Masterpieces of Western Art: A History of Art in 900 Individual Studies from the Gothic to the Present Day. Taschen. ISBN 3-8228-1825-9.
- Taylor, William Edward and Harriet Garcia Warkel, Margaret Taylor Burroughs. (authors) Indianapolis Museum of Art. (ed.) (1996). A Shared Heritage: Art by Four African Americans. Indiana University Press. ISBN 0-936260-62-9.
- Van de Wetering, Ernst. (2002). Rembrandt: The Painter at Work. Rembrandt Series. Amsterdam University Press. ISBN 90-5356-239-7.
- Van Gogh, Vincent and Sjraar van Heugten, Joachim Pissarro, Chris Stolwijk. (2008). Van Gogh and the Colors of the Night The Museum of Modern Art. ISBN 0-87070-737-X.
