= Twickenham by Moonlight =

Painting by Peter Tillemans

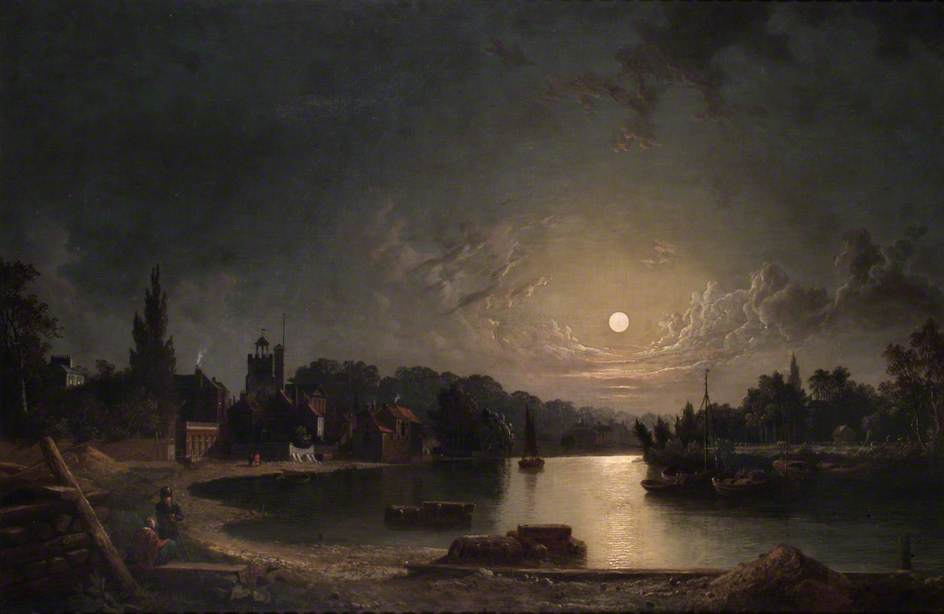
- Artist: Henry Pether
- Year: 1835
- Type: Oil on canvas, landscape painting
- Dimensions: 58.8 cm × 89.7 cm (23.1 in × 35.3 in)
- Location: Orleans House; Twickenham

Twickenham by Moonlight is an 1835 landscape painting by the British artist Henry Pether. It depicts a view of the River Thames looking towards Twickenham, now in Greater London but then some miles east of London. It captures the curve of the river and features the tower of St Mary's church on the left and Eel Pie Island on the right.

Henry was the son of Abraham Pether and brother of Sebastian, both noted landscape artists themselves. Twickenham had been a popular setting for landscape paintings since the late seventeenth century. These were generally panoramic or topographical views such as The Thames at Twickenham by Peter Tillemans. By contrast Pether's painting captures the Romantic style which was at its height at the time by displaying a view along the river by moonlight.

Today the painting is in the collection of Orleans House, having been donated in 1962 by Nellie Ionides.

== Bibliography ==
- De Novellis, Mark. Highlights of the Richmond Borough Art Collection. Orleans House Gallery, 2002.
