= Pether =

Pether is a surname. Notable people with the surname include:

- Abraham Pether (1756–1812), British painter
- Henry Pether (1800–1880), British painter
- Henry E. Pether (1867–1932), British songwriter
- Sebastian Pether (1790–1844), British painter
- Stewart Pether (1916–2010), British cricketer and schoolmaster
