= Orleans House =

Historic house in Twickenham, London

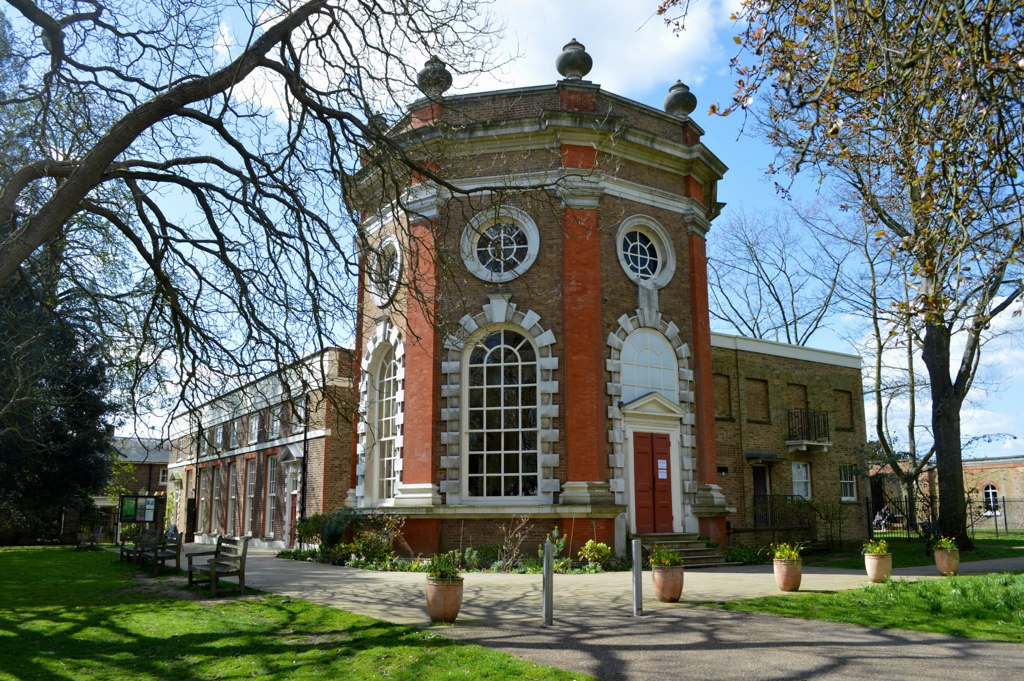

- Location within London Borough of Richmond upon Thames

General information
- Status: Partially demolished: the octagon gallery and its service wing remain and are Grade I listed
- Architectural style: Palladian
- Location: Twickenham, London Borough of Richmond upon Thames, England, UK
- Coordinates: 51°26′50″N 0°19′08″W
- Construction started: 1702
- Completed: 1737
- Demolished: 1926
- Client: James Johnston
- Owner: currently Richmond upon Thames Council

Design and construction
- Architects: John James; James Gibbs

Listed Building – Grade I
- Official name: Orleans House The Octagon Room and Service Wing Adjoining
- Designated: 2 September 1952
- Reference no.: 1250280

Orleans House was a Palladian villa built by the architect John James in 1710 near the Thames at Twickenham, England, for the politician and diplomat James Johnston. It was subsequently named after Louis-Phillipe, Duke of Orléans (later the last King of France) who stayed there in the early 19th century. By the early 20th century it was derelict and in 1926 it was mostly demolished. However, parts of the property, including a baroque octagonal room designed by architect James Gibbs, were preserved. The octagon room and its service wing are listed Grade I by Historic England and, together, with a converted stable block, are now the Orleans House Gallery, a gallery of art relating to the London Borough of Richmond upon Thames and neighbouring areas of London.

== History ==
=== 18th century ===
James Johnston settled at Twickenham at the end of his political career. Johnston had seen diplomatic service in Germany, first as King's envoy to Berlin and later working to secure the Hanoverian succession, and made frequent journeys to Hanover. It was said George I "often conversed with him very familiarly" and that Johnston was "a great favourite of Queen Caroline, who was much entertained with his humour and pleasantry". It was also said "he keeps out a very great rank, and frequently has Mr. Walpool and the greatest courtiers with him at his country house near London; and the King sometimes does him the honour to dine with him". The King (George I) is also recorded to have been a regular casual visitor to the house.

Johnston was one of the first to construct a home on the Thames in Twickenham during the 18th century. He procured a lease (from the then under-lessee Mrs Davies) (Note: Mrs Davies was sister to John Berkeley, 1st Baron Berkeley of Stratton. The manor was vested in the Crown from 1541 and usually, for life, in the possession of the Queen consort. In 1675 Charles II granted a reversionary lease for 41 years after the death of Catherine of Braganza (1638–1705) to John Wilmot, 2nd Earl of Rochester. In 1702 James Johnston obtained from the Queen Dowager a lease for 13 years from 1720. By the time of his death in 1737 Johnston had much further extended the lease and (from George II) obtained yet another 13 years to commence in 1774. On Johnston's death it was sold to George Morton Pitt, who obtained an extension to 1815. Pitt's only child married Brownlow Bertie but died aged 18 without surviving issue and in due course it became the residence of Pitt's wife's daughter by a prior marriage, Sophia Drake (died 1767) and her husband, Sir George Pocock (1706–1792). Daniel Lysons (1811). The Environs of London: Kent, Essex and Herts. London: T Cadell and W Davies. pp. 772–774.) and commissioned architect John James to plan and erect a mansion – a project which spanned the following 35 years. The grounds were extensive, including the area now known as the Orleans House woodlands. Johnston created a fine garden which "included canals, an icehouse, a kitchen garden, a pleasure garden, a wilderness, a grotto and a fruit garden". A baroque octagonal room, designed by architect James Gibbs, was added in 1720 for entertaining George II's Queen Consort, Caroline of Ansbach, who regarded Johnston with great favour.

=== 19th century ===
Louis-Phillippe, Duke of Orléans, while in exile, lived in Johnston's house at Twickenham between 1813 and 1815 and the house was later named after him.

=== 20th century ===
Orleans House Gallery
- Established: 1972
- Location: Riverside, Twickenham, Greater London TW1 3DJ
- Visitors: 56,000 annually
- Website: https://www.orleanshousegallery.org/

Orleans House was demolished in 1926, and the area formerly occupied by the house used to quarry gravel throughout the 1930s. The outbuildings and octagon room were saved by the efforts of a local figure, the Hon. Nellie Levy, later Nellie Ionides, who left it and her collection of 18th- and 19th-century pictures to the borough. It became a listed building in 1952 and was converted into an art gallery in 1972.

In 1973, 16 acres (6.5 ha) at the northern end of the former park were taken as the site of Orleans Park School.

=== 21st century ===
The buildings and site were refurbished between 2005 and 2008 by architects Patel Taylor to incorporate an education centre and a café.

== Orleans House Gallery ==
Orleans House Gallery, which opened in 1972, displays material from the London Borough of Richmond upon Thames' art collection. This includes a portrait of James Johnston by Thomas Gibson, paintings of Orleans House by Arthur Vickers and several other artists, and the Burton Collection, which includes artwork, personal effects and photographs of the explorer Richard Francis Burton.

Orleans House Gallery is also the site of the London Borough of Richmond upon Thames' arts service and provides educational workshops for a wide variety of ages, using the converted stables and coach house as educational spaces. The gallery can also be hired as a wedding venue and for functions.

The gallery reopened in 2018 after a 17-month restoration project costing £3.7 million, which was partly funded by the Heritage Lottery Fund through a £1.8m grant. The Octagon Room has been restored, facilities improved and the upper floor extended to provide additional space. The painting of Queen Caroline has been relocated outside the Octagon Room.

=== Exhibitions ===
The gallery's previous exhibitions have included watercolours and sketches by Richard Dadd and, in 2003, the first major retrospective of Stephen Wiltshire's works. The gallery's exhibition Capability Now (from February to June 2016) marked the 300th anniversary of the birth of Capability Brown.

== Gallery ==
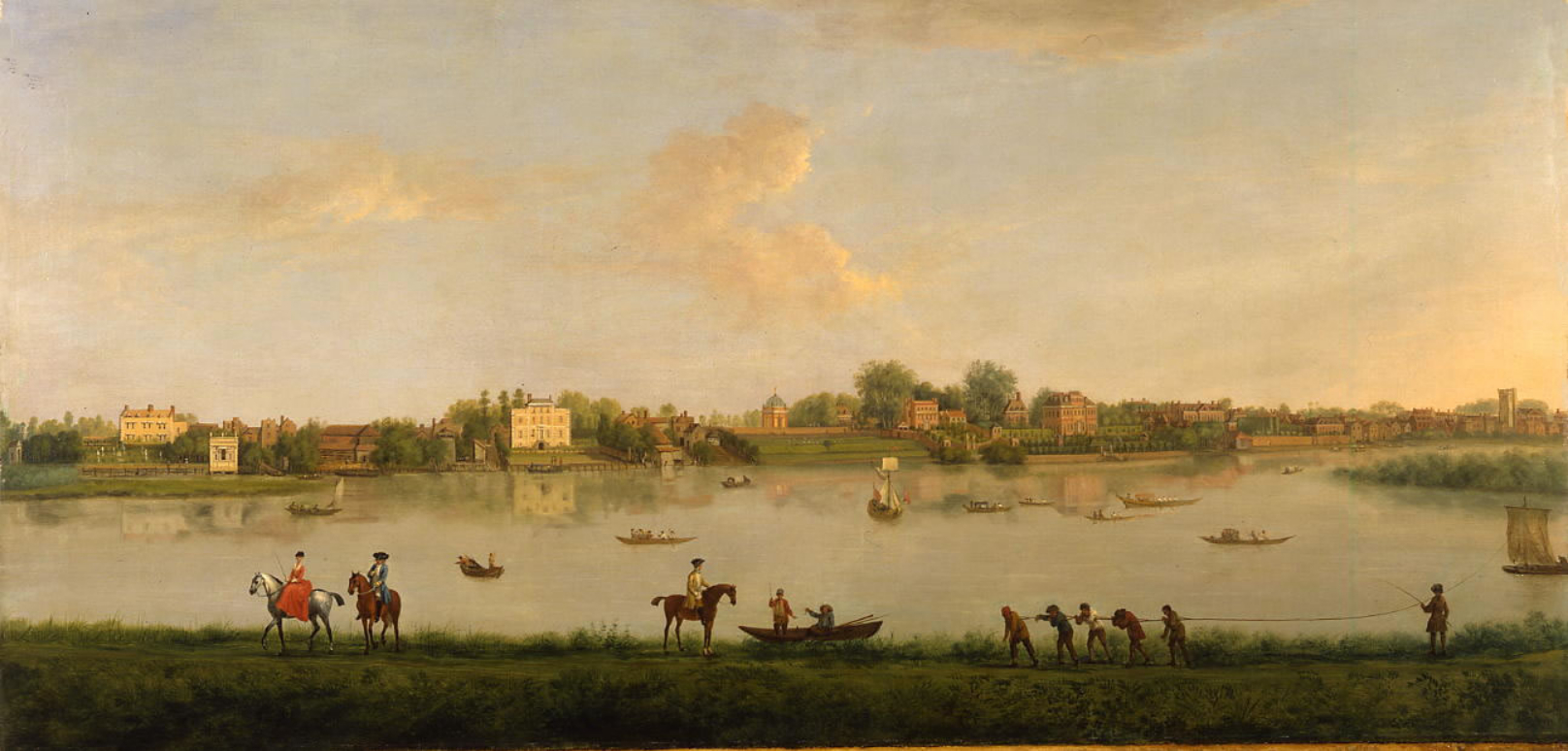
The Thames at Twickenham by Peter Tillemans, 1724

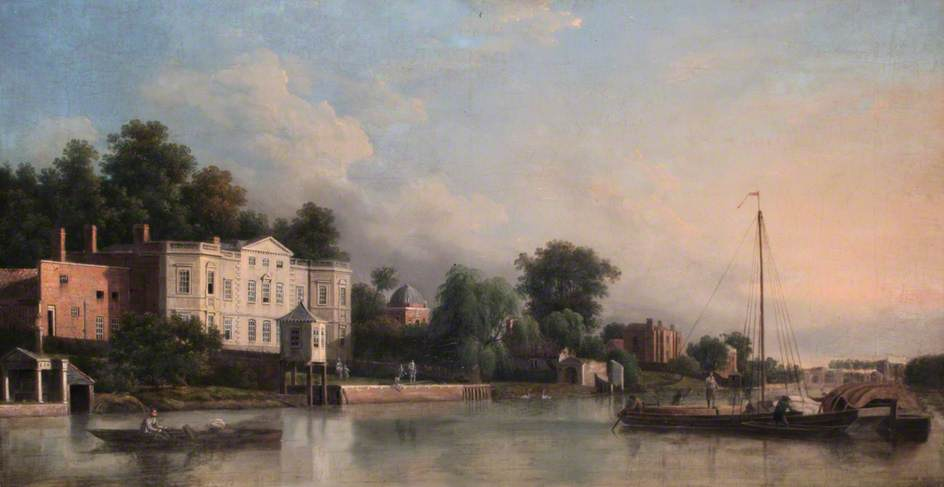
A View of Alexander Pope's Villa, Twickenham, by Samuel Scott, 1760

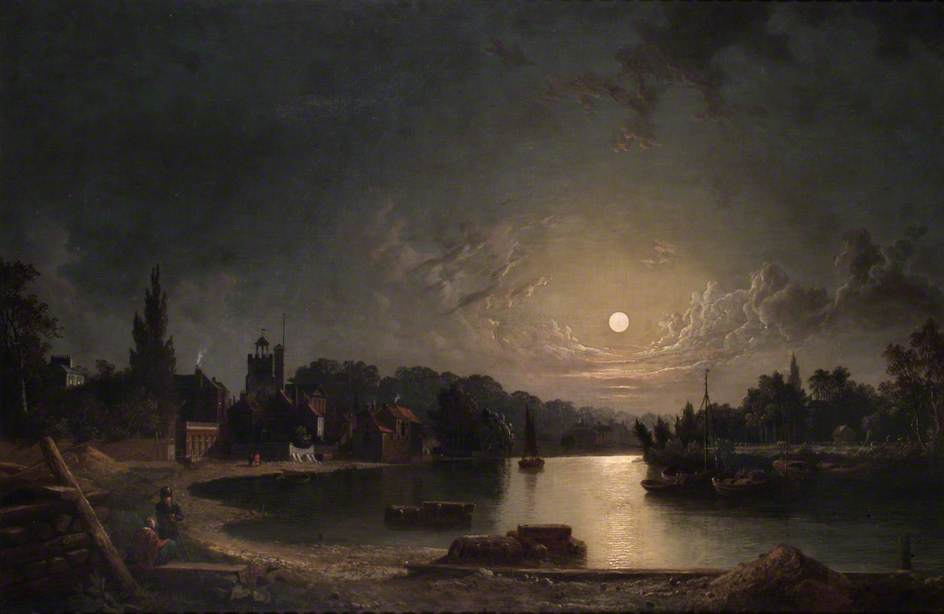
Twickenham by Moonlight by Henry Pether, 1835

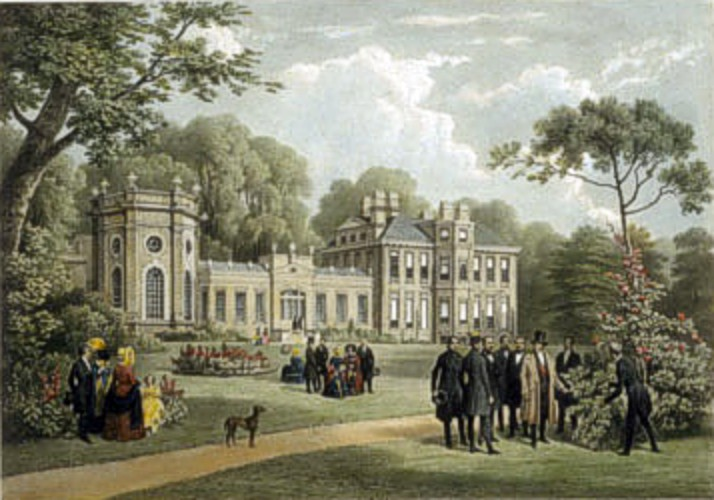
Johnston's Twickenham house in 1844

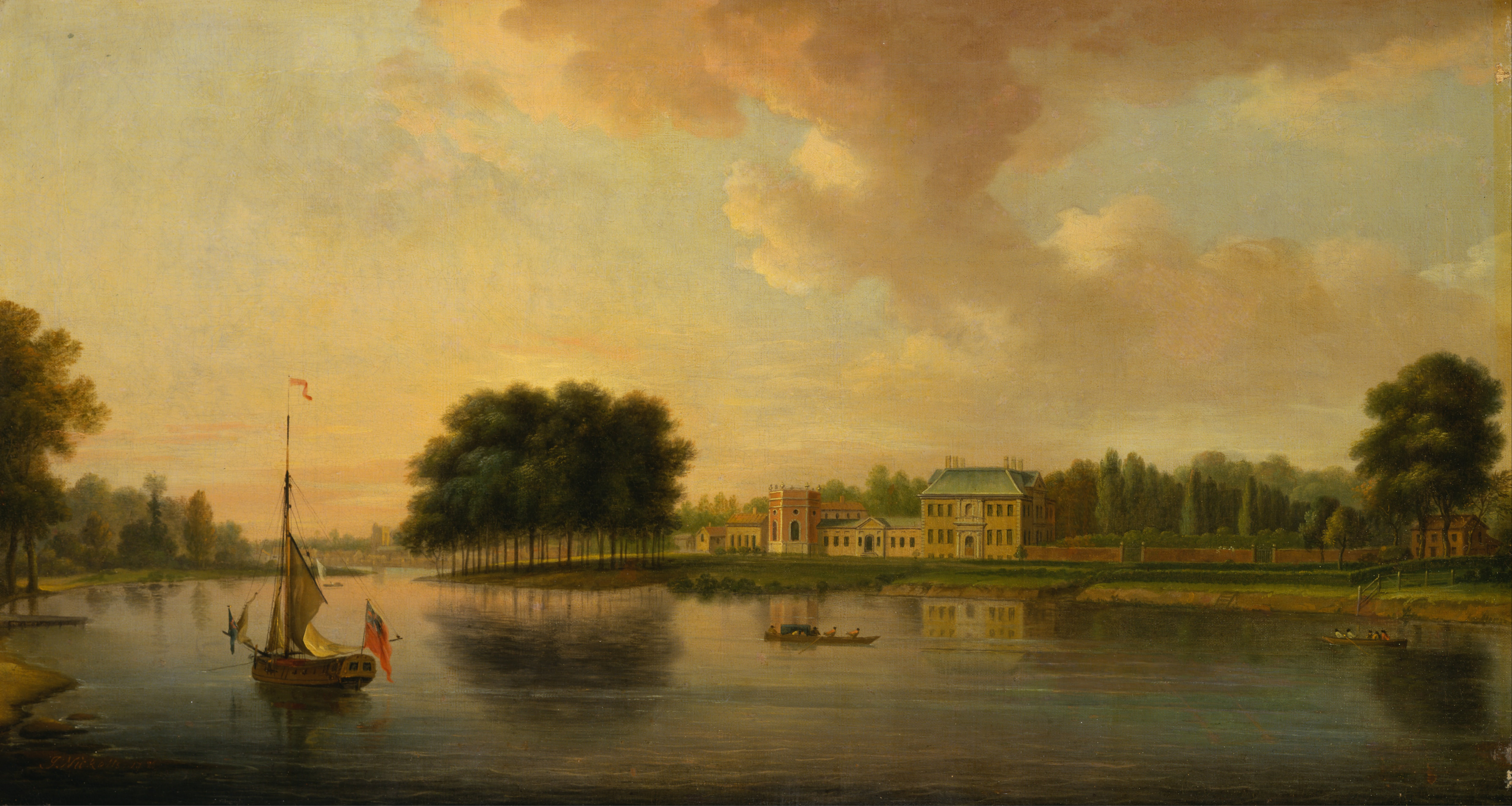
Painting of Orleans House, Twickenham by British artist Joseph Nickolls (1689–1789), circa 1750, held at the Yale Center for British Art

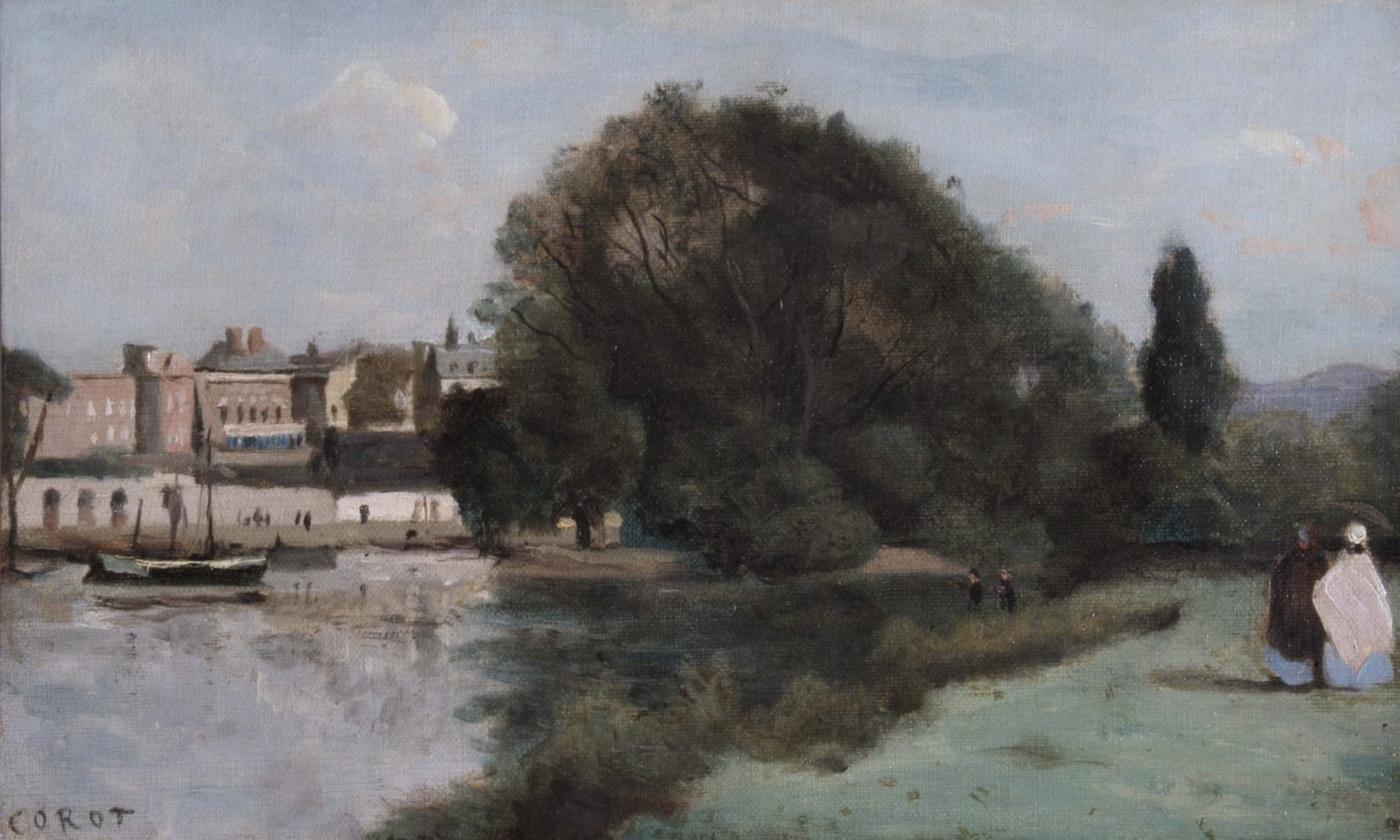
Richmond Near London by Jean-Baptiste-Camille Corot, 1862

== See also ==
- Museum of Richmond
- Twickenham Museum

== Bibliography ==
- Patricia Astley Cooper, The History of Orleans House, Twickenham, Twickenham 1984
- Miranda Stearn and Mark De Novellis, Orleans House – a history, Twickenham 2002: free download
- Orleans House and The Octagon, Local History Notes, Richmond Libraries’ Local Studies Collection, London Borough of Richmond upon Thames
