= John Parker (painter, fl. 1762–1776) =

British painter

- Occupation: Painter

John Parker (fl. 1762–1776) was a British painter.

== Biography ==
After some study in the Duke of Richmond's gallery of casts in London, Parker went to Chichester, where he studied landscape-painting under the brothers George and John Smith, the well-known landscape-painters. On returning to London he resided in Stangate Lane, Lambeth, near Westminster Bridge. In 1762 he exhibited a still-life in crayons at the Free Society of Artists, in 1763 ‘A Cock,’ also in crayons, and in 1764 another still-life. In 1765 and the following years he exhibited landscapes. In 1768 he went to Rome for two years, returning in 1770, when he again exhibited landscapes in the Italian manner both at the Free Society of Artists and at the Royal Academy. His name appears for the last time as an exhibitor in 1776. He was then residing at 26 Portman Street, London.
