= Old Drury =

Old Drury may refer to:

- Old Drury, another name for the Franklin Theatre in Lower Manhattan, New York City, New York during the 1840s
- Old Drury, another name for the Holliday Street Theater in Baltimore, Maryland during the 19th century

== See also ==
- Old Drury Lane Theatre on Fire
