= The Thames at Twickenham =

Painting by Peter Tillemans

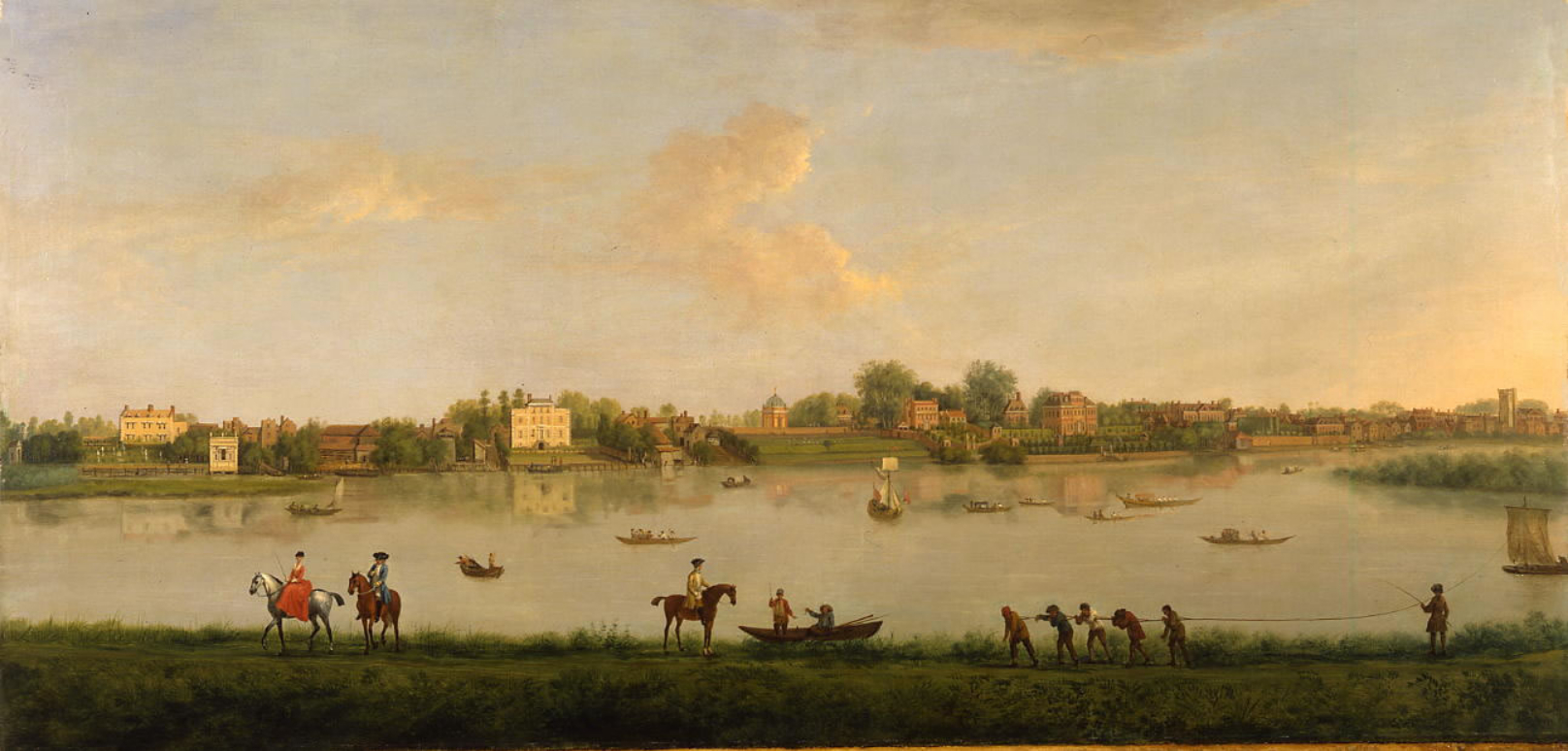
- Artist: Peter Tillemans
- Year: c.1724
- Type: Oil on canvas, landscape painting
- Dimensions: 65 cm × 135 cm (26 in × 53 in)
- Location: Orleans House; Twickenham

The Thames at Twickenham is a c. 1724 landscape painting by the Flemish artist Peter Tillemans. It features a panoramic depiction of the River Thames as it passes Twickenham, then a fashionable settlement to the west of London. The tower of St Mary's Church can be seen in the centre of the town on the right of the painting, with the various riverside villas depicted to the left.

Tillemans had settled in England in, and enjoyed patronage from prominent figures. He relocated to Twickenham partly for his health and produced a number of views of the riverside there. The painting may possibly have been commissioned by Alexander Pope or by the Earl of Radnor, both prominent Twickenham figures and patrons of Tillemans.

Today it is in the collection of Orleans House in Twickenham, which acquired it in 1995 through the acceptance in lieu.

== See also ==
- Twickenham by Moonlight, an 1835 painting by Henry Pether

== Bibliography ==
- Batey, Mavis. Alexander Pope: The Poet and the Landscape. Barn Elms, 1999.
- Brownell, Morris R. Alexander Pope & the Arts of Georgian England. Clarendon Press, 1978.
- De Novellis, Mark. Highlights of the Richmond Borough Art Collection. Orleans House Gallery, 2002.
