= Henry Edridge =

English painter

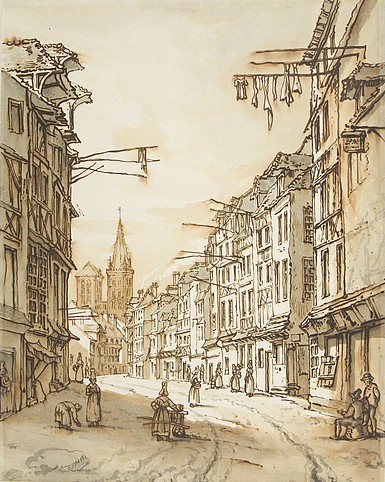
Lisieux (1817)

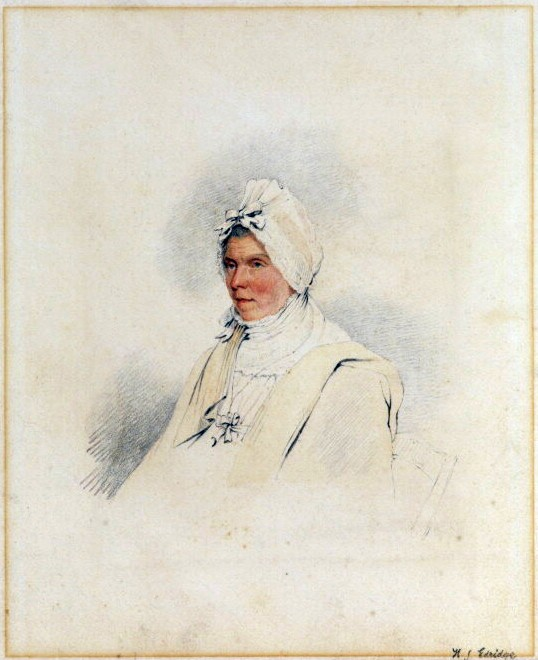
Portrait of Ann Constable (1813), mother of John Constable

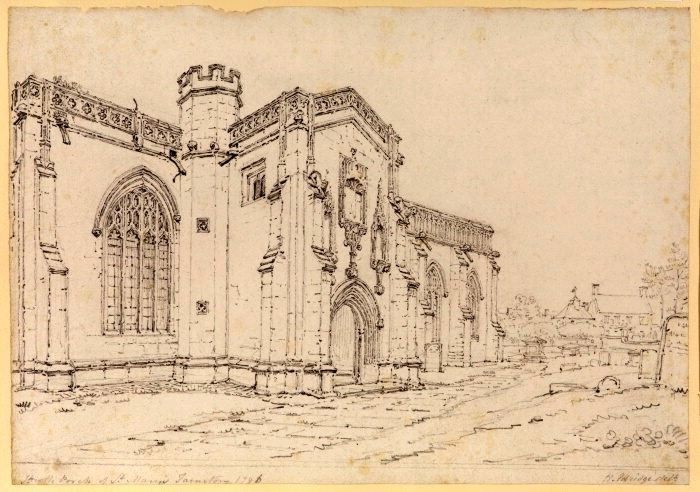
View of St. Mary's church at Taunton (1796)

Henry Edridge ARA (1768 in Paddington – 23 April 1821 in London) was the son of a tradesman and apprenticed at the age of fifteen to William Pether, a mezzotinter and landscapist, and became proficient as a painter of miniatures, portraits and landscapes.

His first portraits were on ivory, and he subsequently turned to paper with black lead and India ink to which he added very ornate backgrounds, but he later produced a large number of elaborately finished pictures in water colours with light backgrounds. These were followed by others in which he combined the depth and richness of oil paintings with the freedom of water colour drawings. His subjects included Lord Nelson, the explorer Mungo Park, the Methodist missionary Thomas Coke, the Prime Minister William Pitt and John Wesley at the age of 88.

Sir Joshua Reynolds was so taken with one of his miniatures, that he insisted on having it and paid him handsomely for it. This was the sign for Edridge to abandon engraving and become a painter. He did wisely in copying many of the works of Reynolds for study.

He first established himself in Golden Square and in 1801 moved to Margaret Street, Cavendish Square, where he remained for twenty years. With the desire to indulge his taste for landscape painting, which he cultivated under Thomas Hearne, he made two excursions to Normandy and Paris, in 1817 and 1819, producing many interesting drawings which were subsequently exhibited. Three of his landscapes are now in the South Kensington Museum, and his sketches on the first Lord Auckland and of Robert Southey are in the National Portrait Gallery. He became a student at the Royal Academy in 1784 and was elected an associate in November 1820. Unhappily he had but a very short time to enjoy this distinction, for he died from an attack of asthma on 23 April 1821.

== Sources ==
- The History of the Royal Academy of Arts - William Sandby (i862) (In public domain)
- Simon Houfe, 'Edridge, Henry (1768–1821)', Oxford Dictionary of National Biography, Oxford University Press, 2004; online edn, Jan 2008, accessed 29 July 2011
