= George Smith (English artist) =

English landscape painter and poet

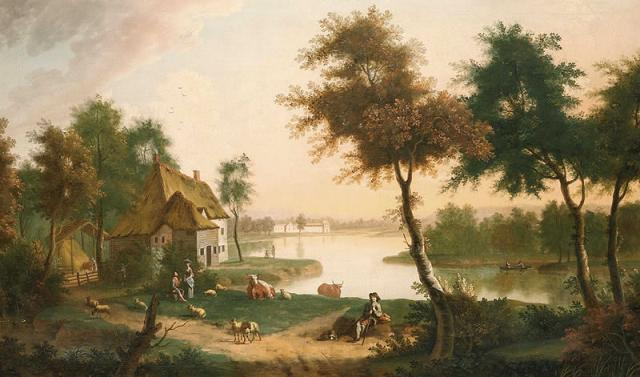
River landscape with a drover in the foreground

George Smith (1713/14 – 7 September 1776) was an English landscape painter and poet, known as "George Smith of Chichester". He and his two brothers, all artists, are known as the "Smiths of Chichester".

== Life and work ==
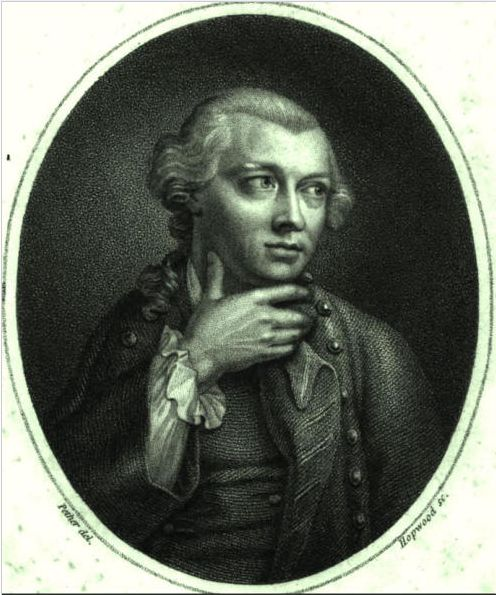
Portrait of George Smith (engraving after William Pether).

George was born at Chichester in Sussex, where his father, William Smith, was a tradesman and Baptist minister. He was the second and most gifted of three brothers, who all practised painting and were known as 'the Smiths of Chichester.' When a boy he was placed with his uncle, a cooper, but, preferring art, became a pupil of his brother William, whom he accompanied to Gloucester; there and in other places he spent some years, painting chiefly portraits, and then returned to Chichester, where, under the patronage of the Duke of Richmond, he settled as a landscape painter.

Smith depicted the rural and pastoral scenery of Sussex and other parts of England in a pleasing but idealistic manner, based on the study of Claude Lorrain and Nicolas Poussin, which appealed to the taste of the day, and he was throughout his life a much-admired artist. His reputation extended to the continent, where he was apparently known as the "British Gessner".

In 1760 Smith gained from the Society of Arts their first premium for a landscape, and repeated his success in 1761 and 1763. He exhibited with the Incorporated Society of Artists in 1760, but in 1761 joined the Free Society of artists", of which he was one of the chief supporters until 1774; in that year only he was a contributor to the Royal Academy.

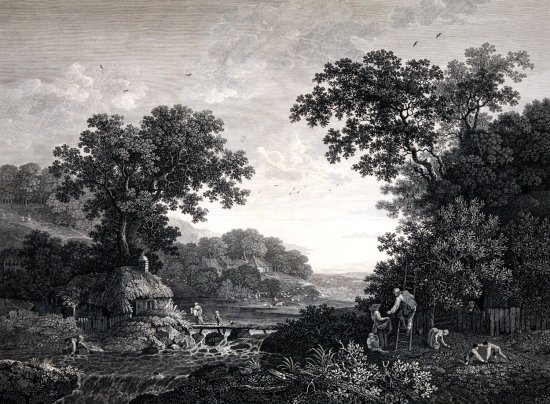
The apple gatherers (engraving by William Woollett)

Many of Smith's works, were engraved by William Woollett, William Elliott (1727–1766), James Peake (1729–1782), Thomas Vivares (1735–1821), and others; a series of twenty-seven plates from his pictures, with the title "Picturesque Scenery of England and Wales", was published between 1757 and 1769. A set of fifty-three etchings and engravings by him and his brother John, from their own works and those of other masters, was published in 1770.

George Smith was also a good performer on the cello and wrote poetry; in 1770 he printed a volume of "Pastorals" of which a second edition, accompanied by a memoir of him, was issued by his daughters in 1811.

George Smith died at Chichester on 7 September 1776. He was buried in the churchyard of St. Pancras, Chichester – as were his two brothers, John and William. He was married and left 3 daughters.

His work can be found in the Yale Center for British Art (Paul Mellon Collection) in the USA; Goodwood House, Sussex, England; Fitzwilliam Museum Cambridge; Tate Gallery and the V&A, London.

== Family ==
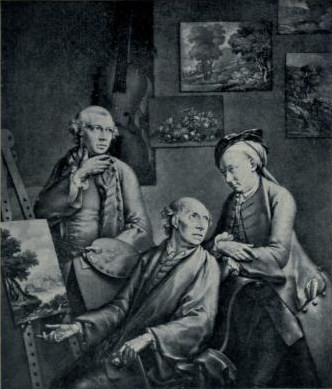
The Brothers Smith of Chichester (from a mezzotint by W. Pether after W. Pether)

John Smith (1717–1764), younger brother of George, was his pupil, and painted landscapes of a similar character; the two frequently worked on the same canvas. John exhibited with the Incorporated Society of Artists in 1760 and with the Free Society from 1761–64. In 1760, and again in 1761, he was awarded the second premium of the Society of Arts, and in 1762, when his brother George was not a candidate, the first; his 'premium' landscape of 1760 was engraved by Woollett. He died at Chichester on 29 July 1764.

William Smith (1707–1764), the eldest of the brothers, born at Guildford, was placed by the Duke of Richmond with a portrait-painter in London, and for a time practised portraiture, first in London and then for eight or nine years at Gloucester. On his return to London he painted fruit and flowers with success until his health gave way, when he retired to Shopwyke, near Chichester. There he died on 4 October 1764.

A group portrait of the three Smith brothers was painted and engraved in mezzotint by William Pether (c. 1738–1821), in 1765. William's cousin, landscape painter Abraham Pether (1756–1812), was a pupil of George Smith.
