= James Seymour (artist) =

English painter

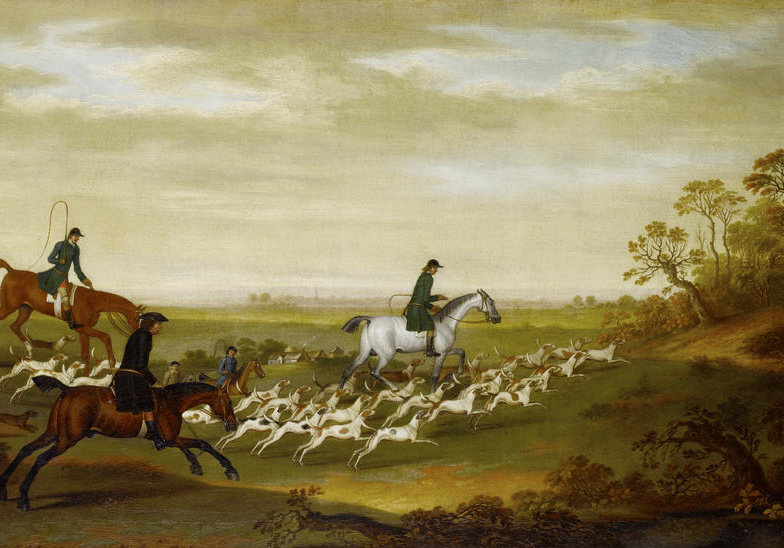
Huntsmen and their hounds by James Seymour, 1750

James Seymour (1702–1752) was an English painter, widely recognized for his equestrian art.

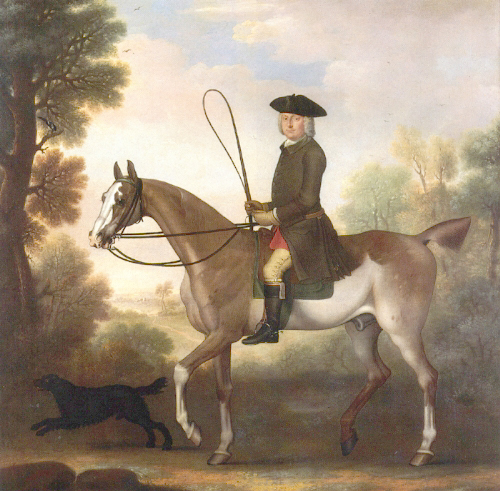
Portrait of Thomas Gage by James Seymour, 1743

Seymour was born in London. His father was an amateur artist and art dealer, whose other business dealings (as a banker, goldsmith, and diamond merchant) afforded young Seymour the leisure time to study art on his own, either his father's or the art at the Virtuosi Club of St. Luke - a gentleman's club his father belonged to, specializing in art. In a short time the boy was a self-taught artist, familiar with many of the prominent artists of the period.

Seymour's love of art was matched only by his love of horses. He began spending time at racetracks early on, and before long found himself absorbed in the sport - drawing, painting, owning, breeding, and racing horses. His art proved popular among the prominent sporting families of the day, eventually garnering Seymour patrons in Sir William Jolliffe and Charles Seymour, 6th Duke of Somerset. Jolliffe's love for horses and art proved great, and his will would later establish an equestrian statue in Hampshire. In time, Seymour's work and fame had spread throughout Europe and America.

Though ultimately his love for horseracing led to his financial ruin, Seymour still ranks among the most important early sporting artists, together with John Wootton and Peter Tillemans being considered one of the three founders of the sporting school.
