= William Pether =

English mezzotint engraver

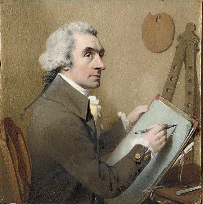
- Self-portrait
- Born: 1739; Carlisle, England
- Died: 19 July 1821 (aged 82–83); Montague Street, Bristol, England
- Occupation: Engraver

William Pether (c. 1739 – 19 July 1821) was primarily an English mezzotint engraver, but also decorated porcelain, made oil paintings and pastel drawings, and invented gadget.

== Life ==
He was born in London in 1739, and became a pupil of Thomas Frye, with whom he entered into a partnership in 1761.

Pether was a fellow of the Incorporated Society of Artists and contributed to its exhibitions' paintings, miniatures, and engravings from 1764 to 1777. He was also an occasional exhibitor with the Free Society and the Royal Academy. He had many pupils, including Henry Edridge and Edward Dayes. He often changed his residence from London to the provinces and back again; and gradually sank into obscurity and neglect.

At the beginning of the 19th century Pether appears to have settled at Bristol, where he made a living as a drawing-master and picture-cleaner; and there he engraved portraits of Edward Colston the slave trader and Bristol benefactor, after Jonathan Richardson the Elder, and Samuel Syer, the historian of Bristol (1816).

His nephew was the eminent landscape painter Abraham Pether (1752–1812). Pether died in Montague Street, Bristol, on 19 July 1821, aged 82 or 83, having long been forgotten in the art world.

== Works ==
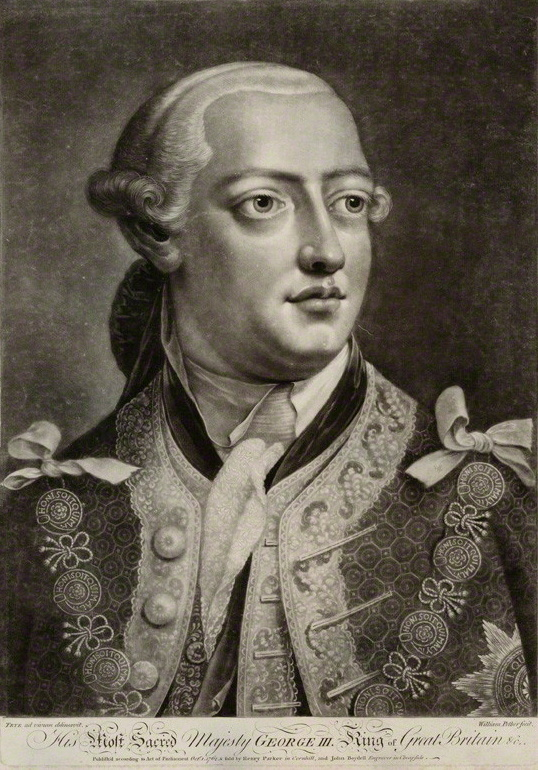
Pether, 1762 portrait of George III, after Thomas Frye.

In 1762 he engraved Frye's portrait of George III in three sizes, and during the following fifteen years executed engravings after English, Dutch, and Italian masters, especially Rembrandt and Joseph Wright of Derby, with strong effects of light and shade. His plates of The Jewish Bride, 1763, Jewish Rabbi, 1764, Officer of State, 1764, and Lord of the Vineyard, 1766, after Rembrandt, and A Lecture on the Orrery, 1768, Drawing from the Gladiator, 1769, The Hermit, 1770, and The Alchymist, 1775, after Wright, were noted as mezzotint work. Pether engraved altogether about fifty plates, some of which were published by John Boydell, but the majority by himself at various addresses in London.

Pether was also a miniaturist and painted some life-sized portraits in oil, three of which—Sarah Bates the singer, the brothers Smith of Chichester, and himself in Spanish dress—he also engraved. In 1777 he sent his own portrait with the disguised title, Don Mailliw Rehtep.

His last plate published in London is dated 1793, and he exhibited at the Royal Academy for the last time in 1794.
