= Old Drury Lane Theatre on Fire =

Painting by Abraham Pether

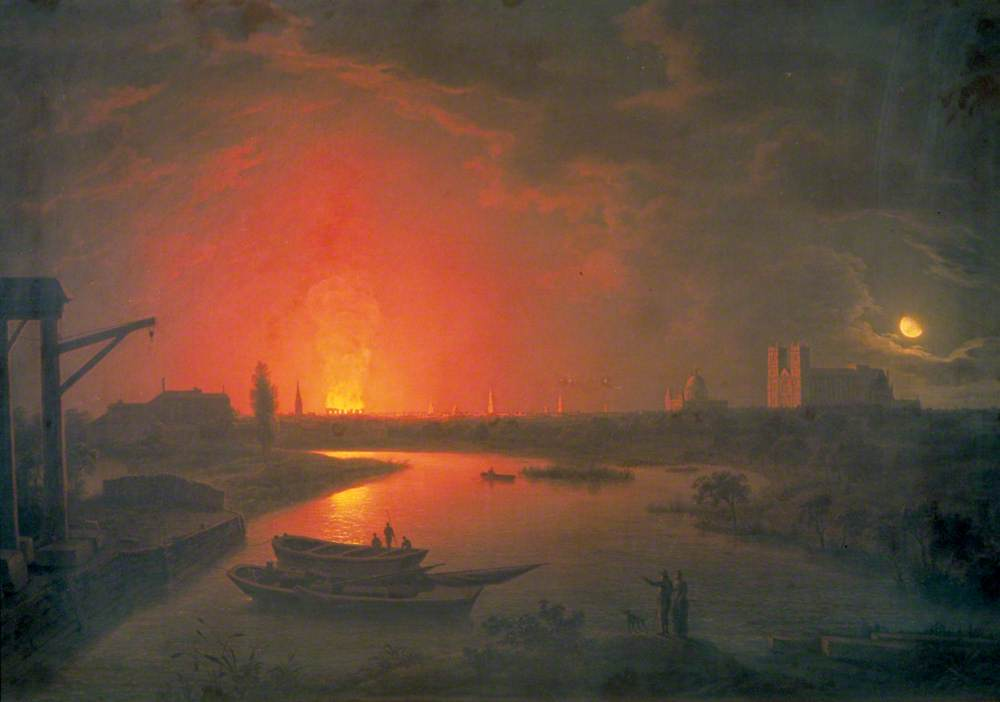
- Artist: Abraham Pether
- Year: 1809
- Type: Oil on canvas, cityscape painting
- Dimensions: 74 cm × 107 cm (29 in × 42 in)
- Location: Guildhall Art Gallery; London

Old Drury Lane Theatre on Fire is an 1809 oil painting by the British artist Abraham Pether. It depicts a panoramic view of London on the night of 24 February 1809, the night that the Theatre Royal, Drury Lane burned down during a major fire. It portrays the scene from a bridge over the River Thames looking eastwards with the skyline illuminated by the blaze. The playwright and politician Richard Brinsley Sheridan who owned the theatre, reportedly watched it burn while drinking and quipped "a man may surely be allowed to take a glass of wine by his own fireside". The Times suggested it was the most major such event since the Great Fire of London.

The painting is today in the collection of the Guildhall Art Gallery in the City of London, having been acquired in 1893.

== Bibliography ==
- Atlee, James. Nocturne: A Journey in Search of Moonlight. University of Chicago Press 2011.
- Roe, Sonia. Oil Paintings in Public Ownership in the City of London of London. Public Catalogue Foundation, 2009.
- Wright, Patrick. Iron Curtain: From Stage to Cold War. Oxford University Press, 2009.
