= Abraham Pether =

English landscape painter

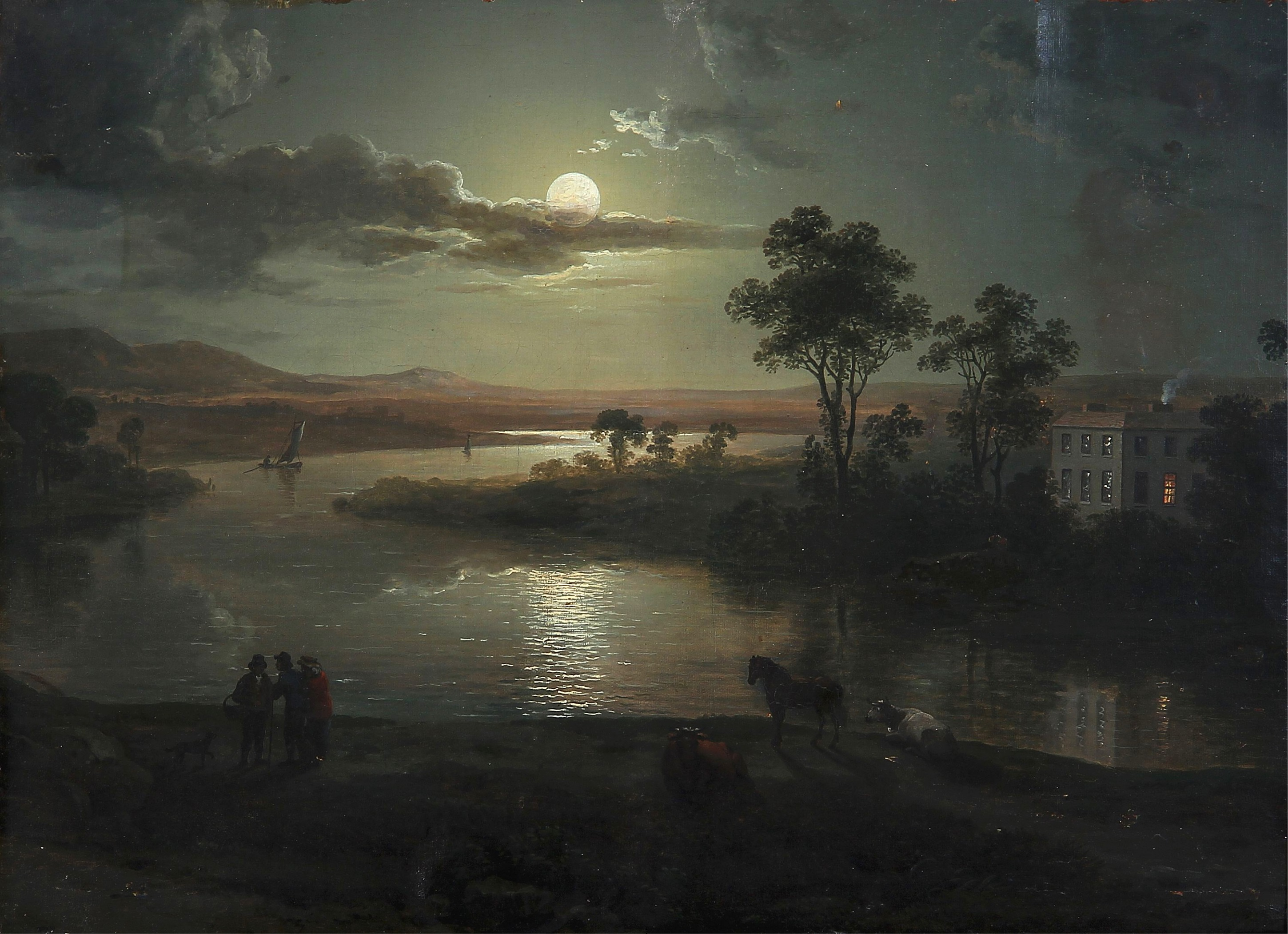
Evening Scene With Full Moon and Persons (1801)

Abraham Pether (8 October 1752 – 13 April 1812) was an English landscape painter, recognised for his skill in depicting moonlit scenes. He was also a talented musician, inventor, mathematician and philosopher.

== Life and work ==
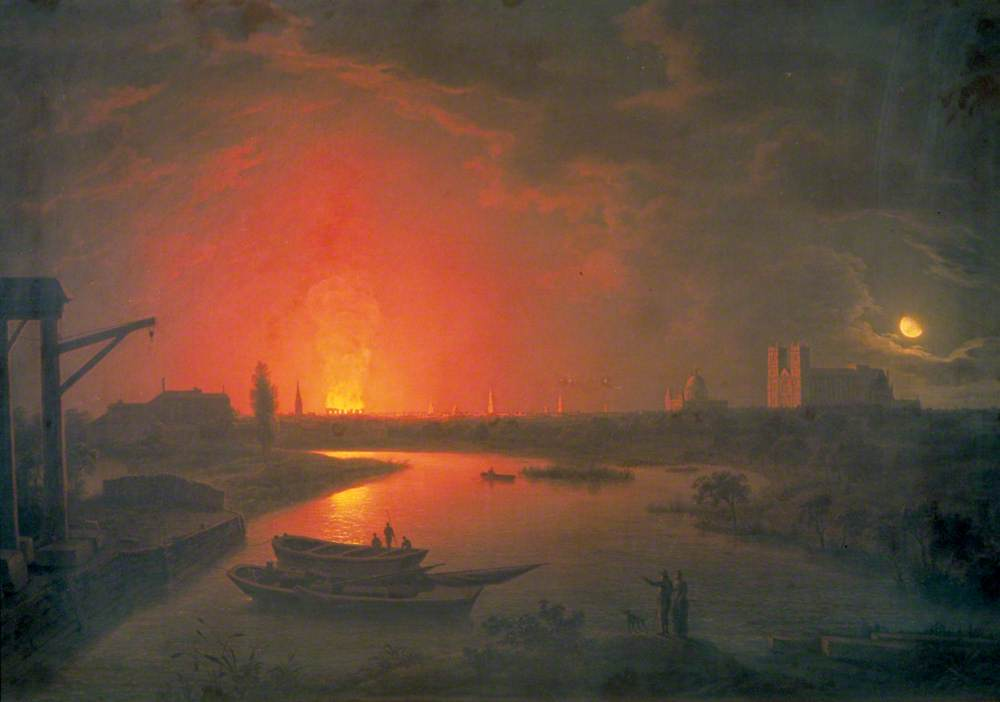
Old Drury Lane Theatre on Fire, 1809

Abraham was born on 8th October 1752 in St. James', Piccadilly in London. He was the nephew of the eminent engraver William Pether. In childhood Abraham showed a great talent for music, and at the age of nine played the organ in one of the Chichester churches.

Adopting art as his profession, he became a pupil of George Smith, whom he greatly surpassed. He painted river and mountain scenery, with classical buildings, in a pleasing though artificial style but his reputation rests on his moonlight subjects, which attracted much admiration, and earned for him the sobriquet of "Moonlight" Pether. He was partial to the combination of moonlight and firelight, as in such subjects as Eruption of Vesuvius, Ship on Fire in a Gale at Night, An Iron foundry by Moonlight etc., which he painted with fine feeling and harmony of colour. In doing so he became one of the finest early English painters of chiaroscuro.

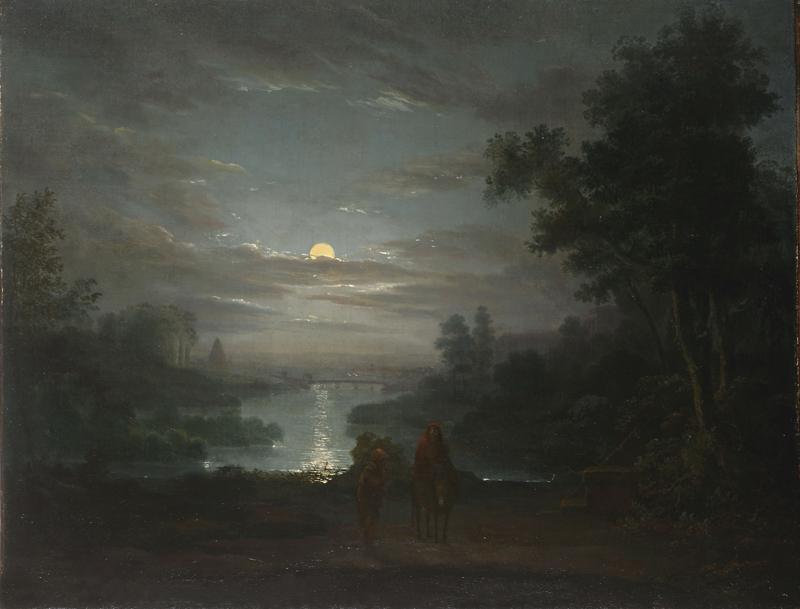
Rest on the flight into Egypt

Pether was a major exhibitor with both the Free Society of Artists and the Incorporated Society of Artists from 1773 to 1791, and at the Royal Academy from 1784 to 1811. He was a member of the Incorporated Society of Artists. His "Harvest Moon", which was at the academy in 1795, was highly praised at the time. He had an extensive knowledge of scientific subjects, and in his moonlight pictures the astronomical conditions are always correctly observed.

Pether was also a clever inventor, constructing telescopes and microscopes for his own use, and lectured on electricity using instruments of his own making. He also invented his own type of pencil.

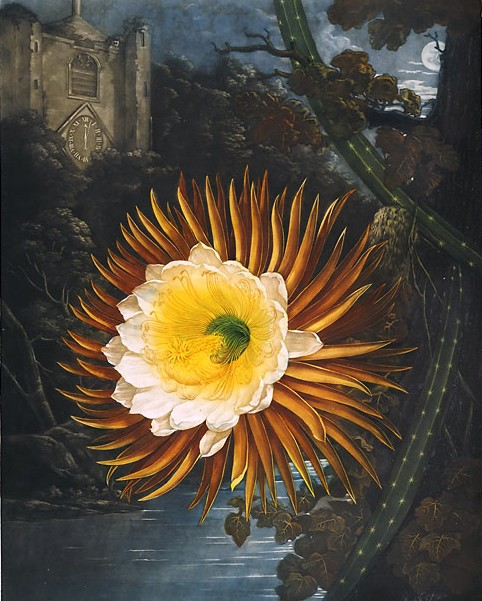
The Night Blowing Cereus (flower painted by Philip Reinagle, moonlit background by Pether)

Although his art was popular, Pether was never able to do more than supply the daily wants of his large family, and when attacked by a lingering disease, which incapacitated him for work and eventually caused his death, he was reduced to great poverty. He died at Southampton on 13 April 1812, leaving a widow, Elizabeth, and nine children quite destitute; and the fact that they were unable to obtain any assistance from the Artists' Benevolent Fund was made the occasion of a fierce attack upon the management of that society. Elizabeth Pether later went into business with a partner Thomas Thornton as "Pether & Co.", selling black lead and chalk pencils. An advertisement in The Times in 1816 stated of the instruments: "the leads being freed by a chymical process from all impurities, and scratching particles".

Abraham Pether and his sons Sebastian (1793–1844) and Henry Pether (1800–1880), specialised in moonlit scenes. It is thought that Abraham had a brother called Thomas Pether (they are recorded as sharing a residence); the latter was a wax modeller who exhibited portraits in wax with the Free Society of Artists from 1772 to 1781.

== See also ==
- Night in paintings (Western art)
