= Peter Tillemans =

Flemish painter

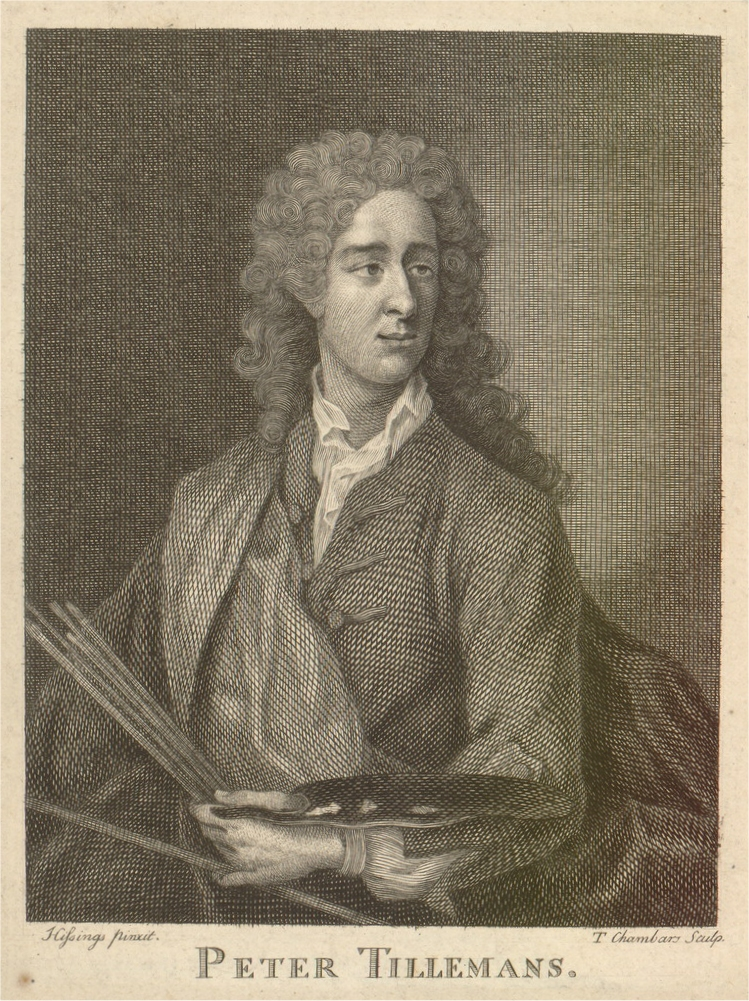
Peter Tillemans, engraving by T. Chambers after Hissings's portrait

Peter Tillemans (c. 1684 – 5 December 1734) was a Flemish painter, best known for his works on sporting and topographical subjects. Alongside John Wootton and James Seymour, Tillemans was one of the founders of the English school of sporting painting.

Tillemans died in England in 1734, having resided there since 1708.

== Life ==
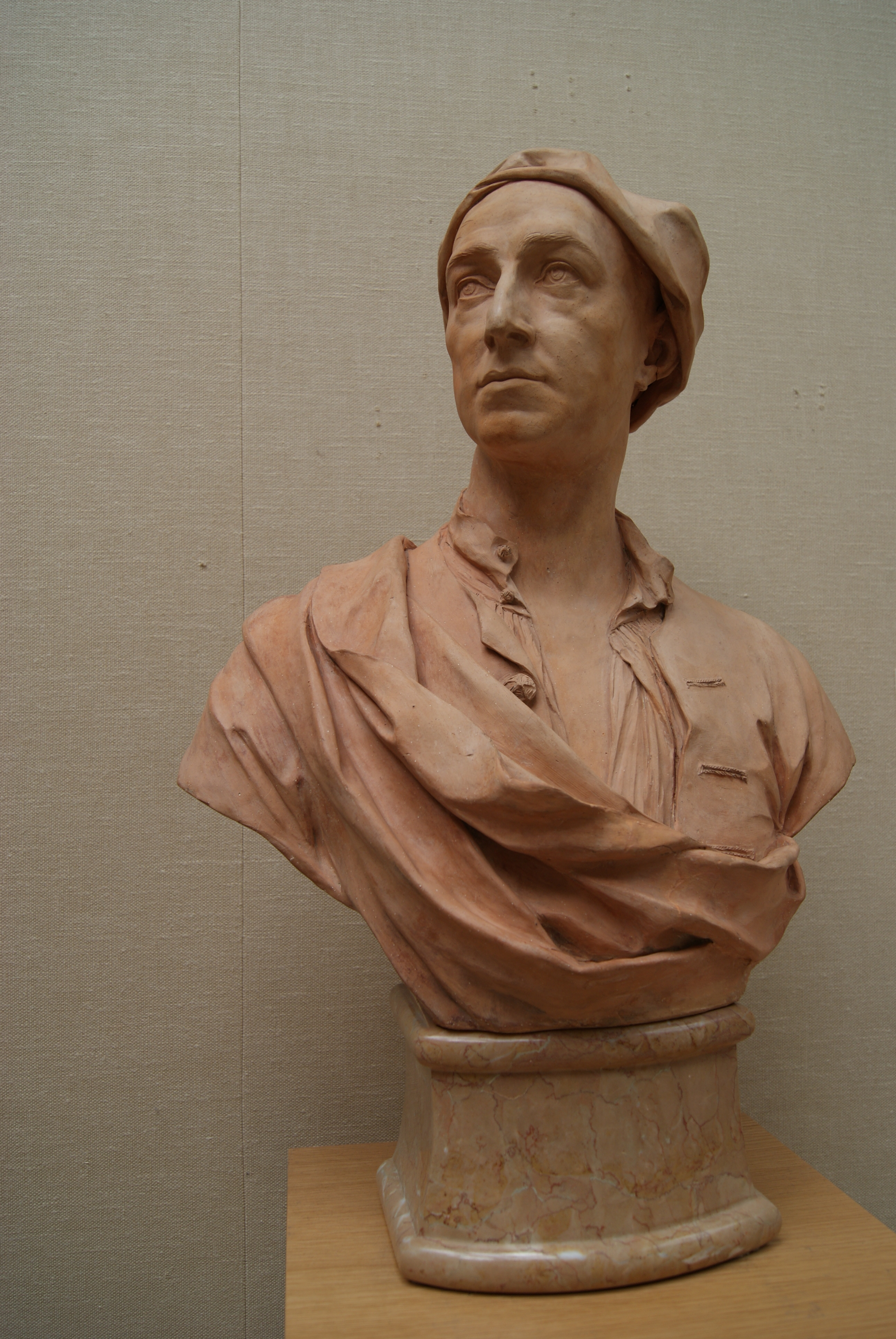
A bust of a man believed to be Peter Tillemans, by John Michael Rysbrack (1727)

Tillemans was born in Antwerp in c. 1684, the son of a diamond-cutter, and studied painting there under various masters. As he was the brother-in-law of another Flemish painter, Pieter Casteels, it is assumed that he married before leaving Antwerp. Like other artists from the Low Countries such as Dirk Maas, Jan Wyck and Willem van de Velde the Younger, Tillemans moved to England. In Tillemans's case he moved in 1708, induced to do so by a picture-dealer called Turner: he spent the rest of his life working there.

In his Sportsmen in a Landscape (1971), Aubrey Noakes offers this description of Tillemans:

If we may judge from his success Tillemans was a socially agreeable and charming man. A portrait of him reveals that he was a gentle, friendly-looking fellow, with long curling hair, presumably his own and not a wig, such as was commonly worn by members of the upper and professional classes in the late eighteenth century.

A chronic sufferer of asthma, Tillemans retired to Richmond "on account of his ill state of health". He died at the house of Cox Macro (1683–1767, later chaplain to George II) in Little Haugh Hall, in Suffolk, on 5 December 1734 (the previous day he "had been busy on a horse portrait") and was buried on 7 December at Stowlangtoft. His collection of paintings had been sold in an auction conducted by Macro on 19 and 20 April 1733 and included paintings by James Tillemans, probably a son or other relation, and by Arthur Devis, who, like Joseph Francis Nollekens, was one of Tillemans's pupils. Macro had a bust of Tillemans made by John Michael Rysbrack, placing it "in a niche at the top of a staircase in Little Haugh Hall". A portrait of the artist, engraved by T. Chambers, from a painting by Hissings, is given in Fuseli's 1805 revised edition of Rev. Matthew Pilkington's A Dictionary of Painters.

== Painting ==
=== Early works ===
Tillemans was brought to England in 1708 by "Turner, a picture dealer"; his first works were copies of battle scenes made for Turner, particularly of the works of Jacques Courtois, as well as small genre pictures. He enjoyed much success imitating the style and execution of David Teniers.

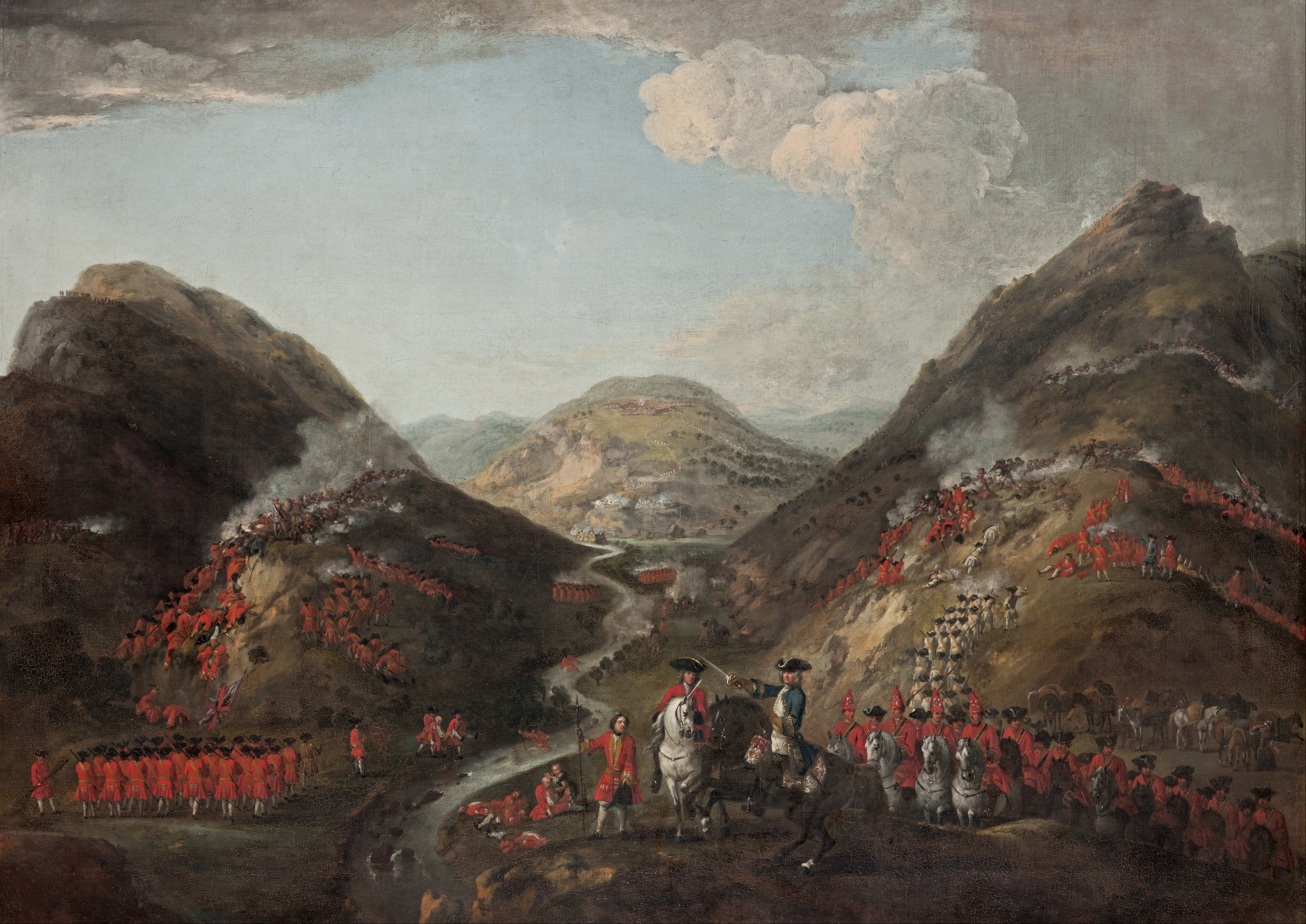
The Battle of Glenshiel 1719, 1719

Tillemans worked in many different styles and rarely dated his work. After at first working as a copyist, he quickly made his name, and among his first important commissions in England were two paintings of the interior of the Palace of Westminster, one of Queen Anne in the House of Lords (1708–14), the other of the House of Commons in session (c. 1710). By 1711 Tillemans joined Godfrey Kneller's Academy of Painting and Drawing in Great Queen Street, London, stating his speciality as "landskip".

His main residence was in Westminster but he travelled extensively on commission. Cox Macro, his most faithful patron and the one for whom his work is best documented, gave him commissions, including battle and hunting scenes, landscapes, renovation work, and portraits from 1715. In 1716 Tillemans repainted part of a portrait of Macro by Frans van Mieris from around 1703, making alterations to his face. That year he also painted Macro in the background of The Artist's Studio (c. 1716), a self-portrait, with a pupil and Cox Macro, surrounded in the studio by paintings. (He also painted Macro's children in Master Edward and Miss Mary Macro in c. 1733). In 1717, his conversation piece of the royal family making music was shown at the Bartholomew fair. He was commissioned in 1719 by the antiquary John Bridges to "make about 500 drawings for a projected history of Northamptonshire", and some of these were later published in Peter Whalley's History and Antiquities of the County of Northamptonshire (1791). His other patrons included the Duke of Devonshire, the 4th Baron Byron (to whom he was also drawing instructor), and the Duke of Kingston.

His "highly accurate" eponymous painting of the Battle of Glen Shiel in the Scottish National Portrait Gallery, painted in the same year as the battle, was originally catalogued as The Battle of Killiecrankie 1689.

=== Sporting and topographical works ===
The greater part of Tillemans's oeuvre was painted from approximately 1720 onwards, and it is from the works painted over these years that he chiefly derives his fame.

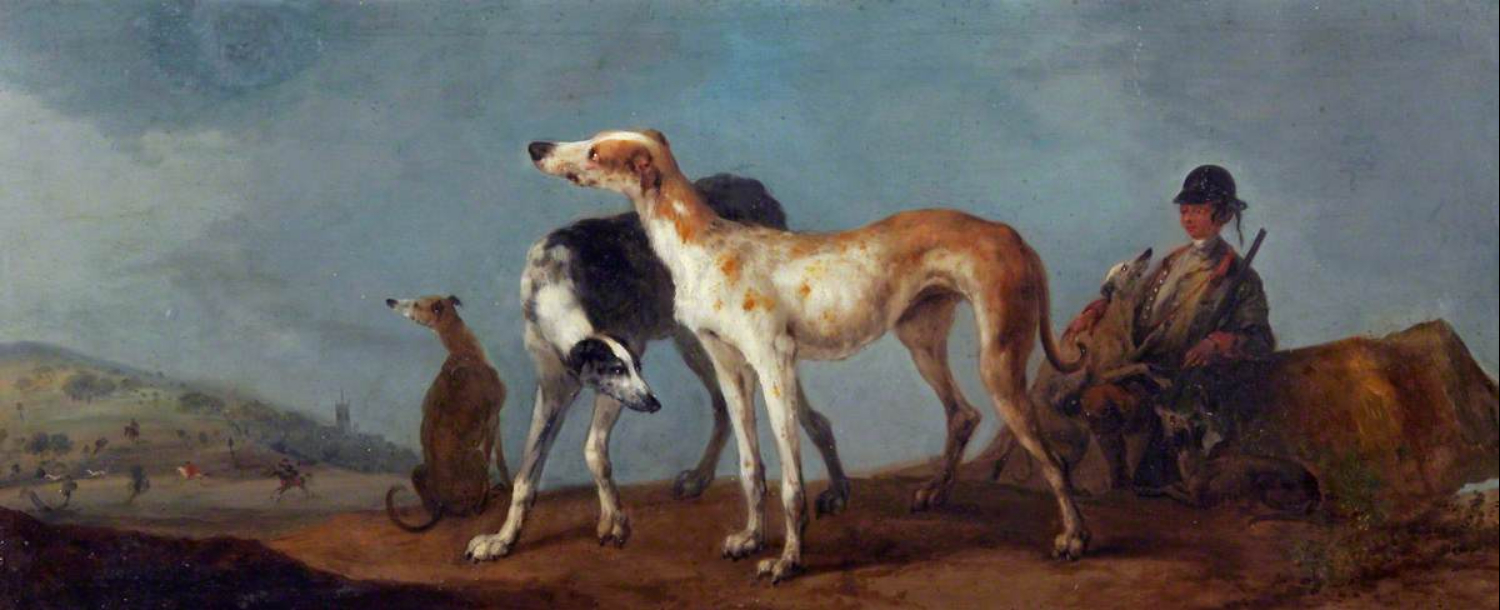
Three Hounds with Horsemen, a Hunt to the Left

During the early 1720s, Tillemans moved successfully into the field of painting dogs, horses and racing scenes and was one of the earliest painters of sporting scenes in England; four of these works, "engraved by Claude du Bosc and published in 1723, are among the most spectacular early sporting prints in England".

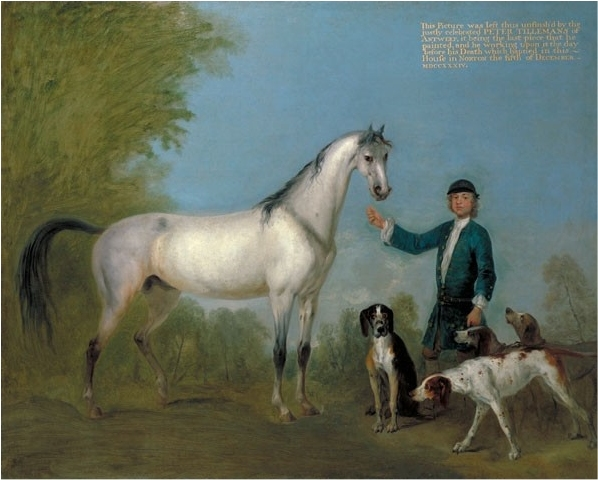
Horse with Groom and Hounds, 1734. Tillemans was working on this unfinished painting on the day before he died.

The development of painting on sporting themes was centred on the Newmarket Racecourse in the market town of Newmarket in Suffolk. Together with his friend John Wootton (a pupil of Jan Wyck) and James Seymour, Tillemans was one of the three founders of the English sporting school; their paintings "show the first marriage of the topographical tradition of landscape with a sporting element". Because both Wootton and Tillemans omitted to sign many of their works, some of them are difficult to tell apart. Tillemans's Newmarket: the Long Course (1723) is in the Government Art Collection. Another Newmarket scene, The Newmarket Watering Course and a sporting scene, Three Hounds with Horsemen, a Hunt to the Left, both in Norwich Castle Museum and Art Gallery, were originally part of John Patteson's collection. Patteson had inherited many of Tillemans's paintings by his marriage into Macro's family, and these now form part of the Patteson Collection at Norwich Castle Museum. Tilleman painted numerous portraits of racehorses for his patrons, among whom were the Dukes of Somerset, Rutland, and Bolton, and the Earl of Portmore.

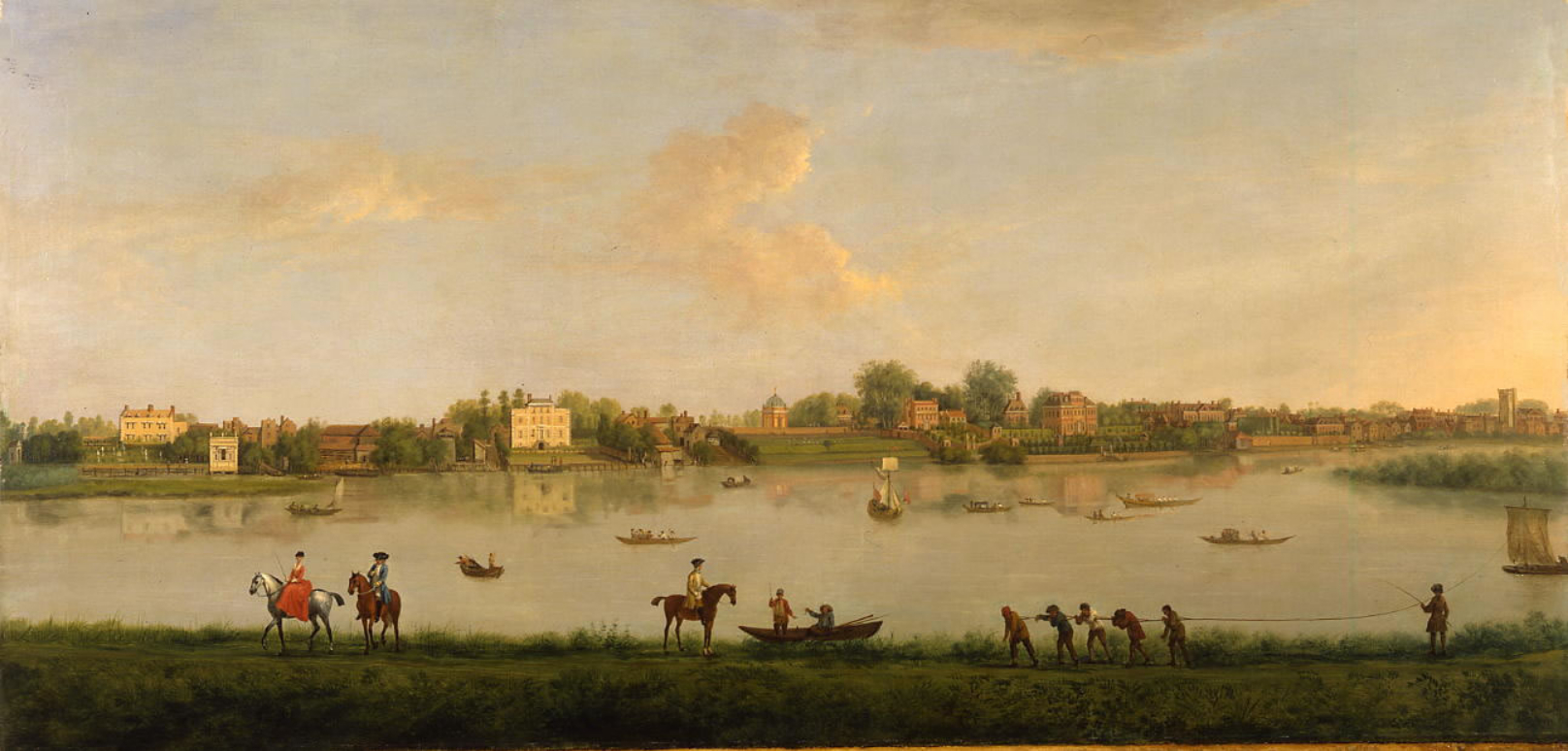
The Thames at Twickenham, 1724

According to Sir Walter Gilbey in his Animal Painters of England From the Year 1650: A brief history of their lives and works:

The excellent plates engraved by Js. Sympson and Jn. Lloyds, from a set of three pictures descriptive of " Newmarket Horse Races," enable us to measure Tilleman's talent as a horse painter. Equine anatomy had not yet been mastered — had been hardly approached seriously — by artists when these pictures were painted, but the "different actions and postures," to quote from the inscription on the first of the series, are rendered with a skill that shows no inconsiderable advance in the art of horse portraiture.

In 1724, Tillemans worked with Joseph Goupy on scenery for the Haymarket opera house.

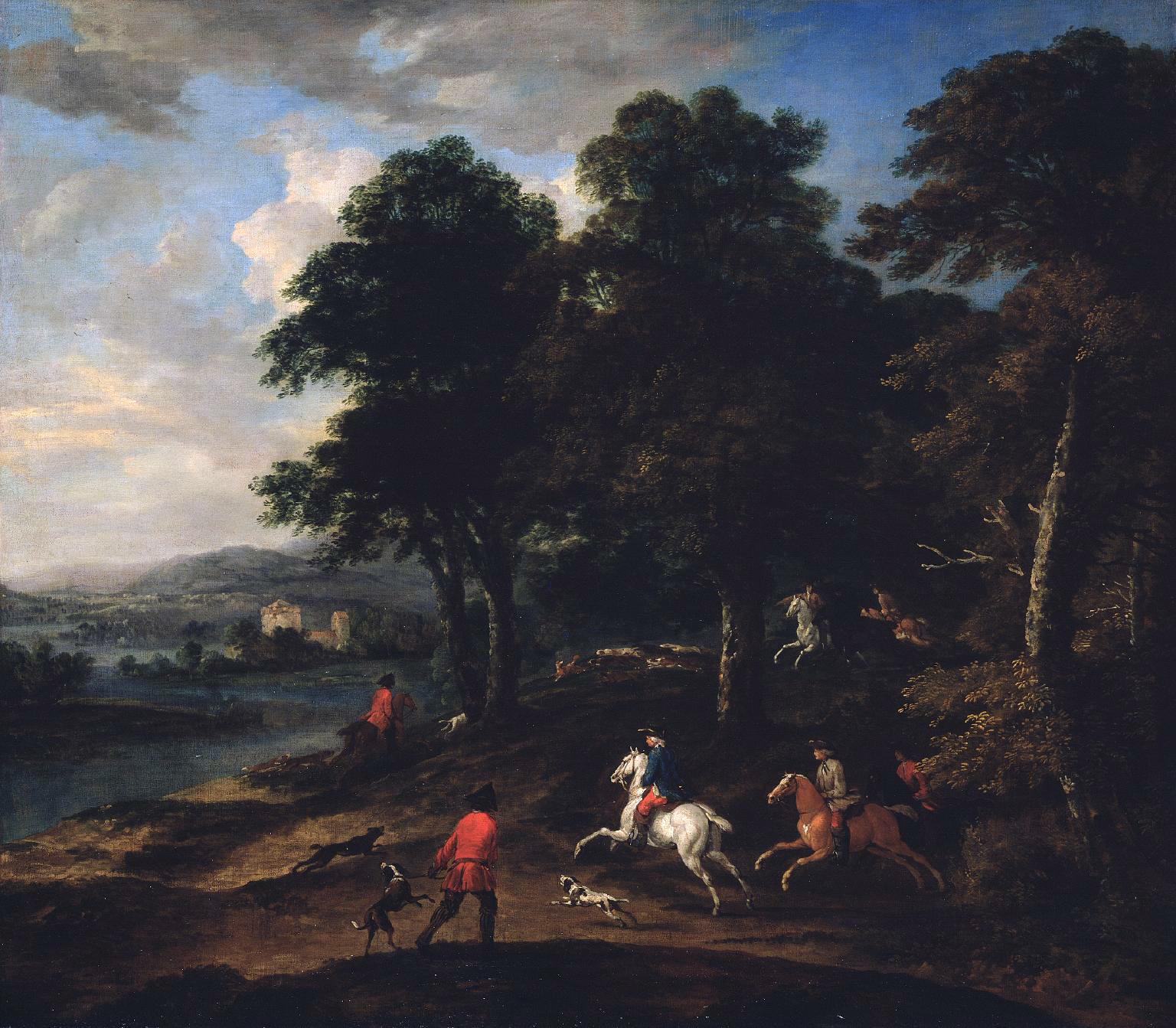
Foxhunting in Wooded Country, 1720–30

Tillemans was also a member of the Rose and Crown Club, and in 1725 was recorded by George Vertue as steward to the Society of the Virtuosi of St Luke. Vertue noted that Tillemans was acquainted with "people of Fashion & persons of Quality" and was in demand as a painter of country-house and estate views.

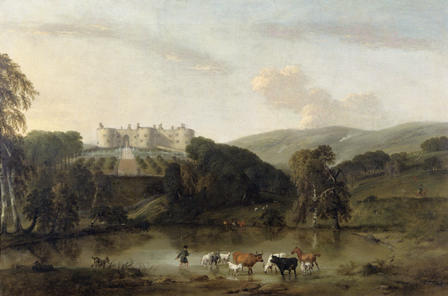
Chirk Castle from the North, 1725

His country house paintings include Chatsworth House (1720s), Holker Hall, and Chirk Castle in Denbighshire (1725). In such work the houses often stand in landscapes brought to life by animals and hunting scenes.

Tillemans painted several topographical works of views in Richmond and Twickenham, to the west of London, including A View of Richmond from Twickenham Park (later engraved by P. Benazech), A View from Richmond Hill and The Thames at Twickenham (known also as A Prospect of Twickenham). This last painting, the "earliest complete topographical view of the river frontage in the 18th century", was commissioned either by the poet Alexander Pope (his villa by the Thames is shown in the painting) or John Robartes, later 4th Earl of Radnor. His panorama of The Thames from Richmond Hill (c. 1723) was one of three paintings done for the Earl of Radnor.

== Known works ==
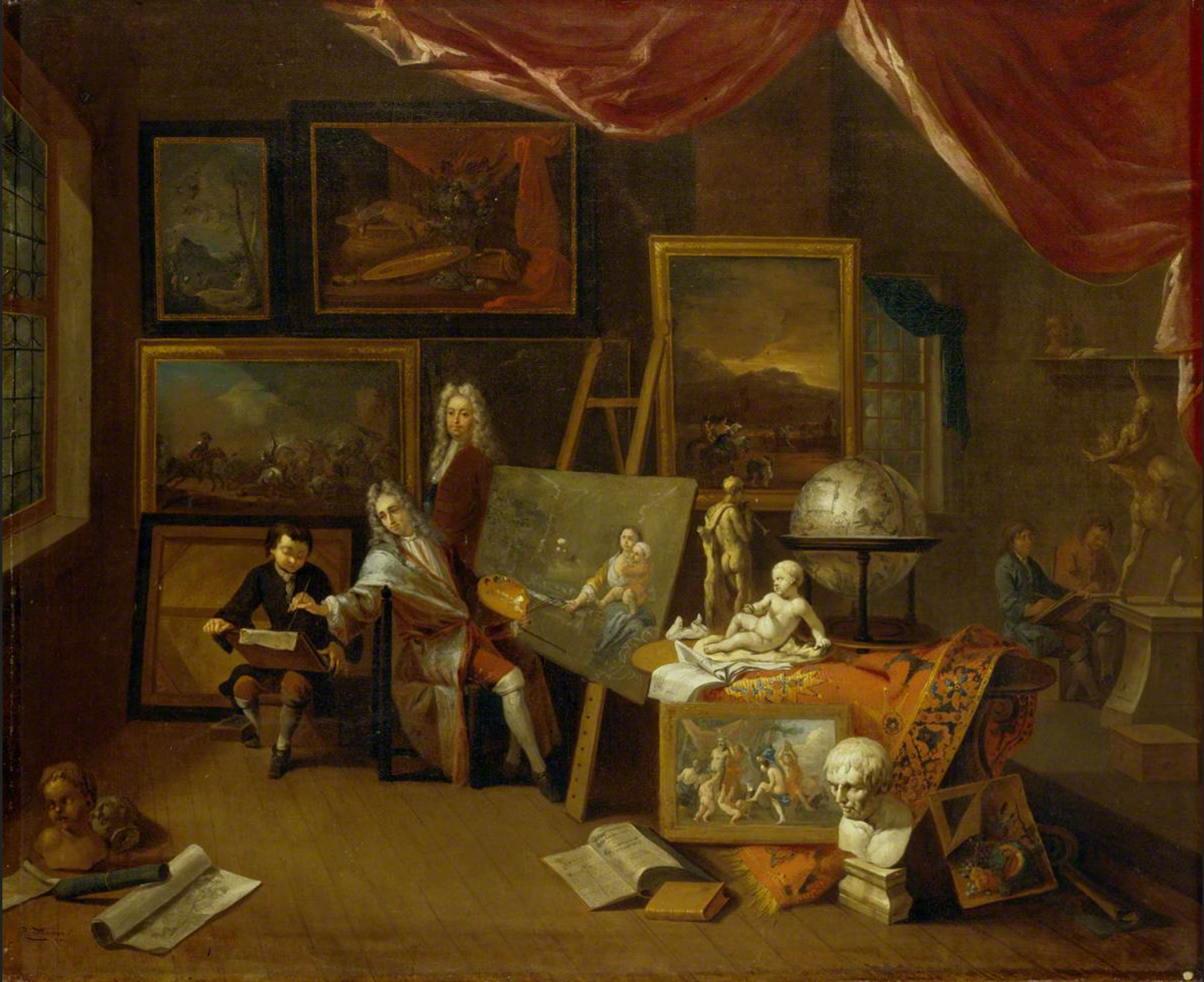
The Artist's Studio, c. 1716

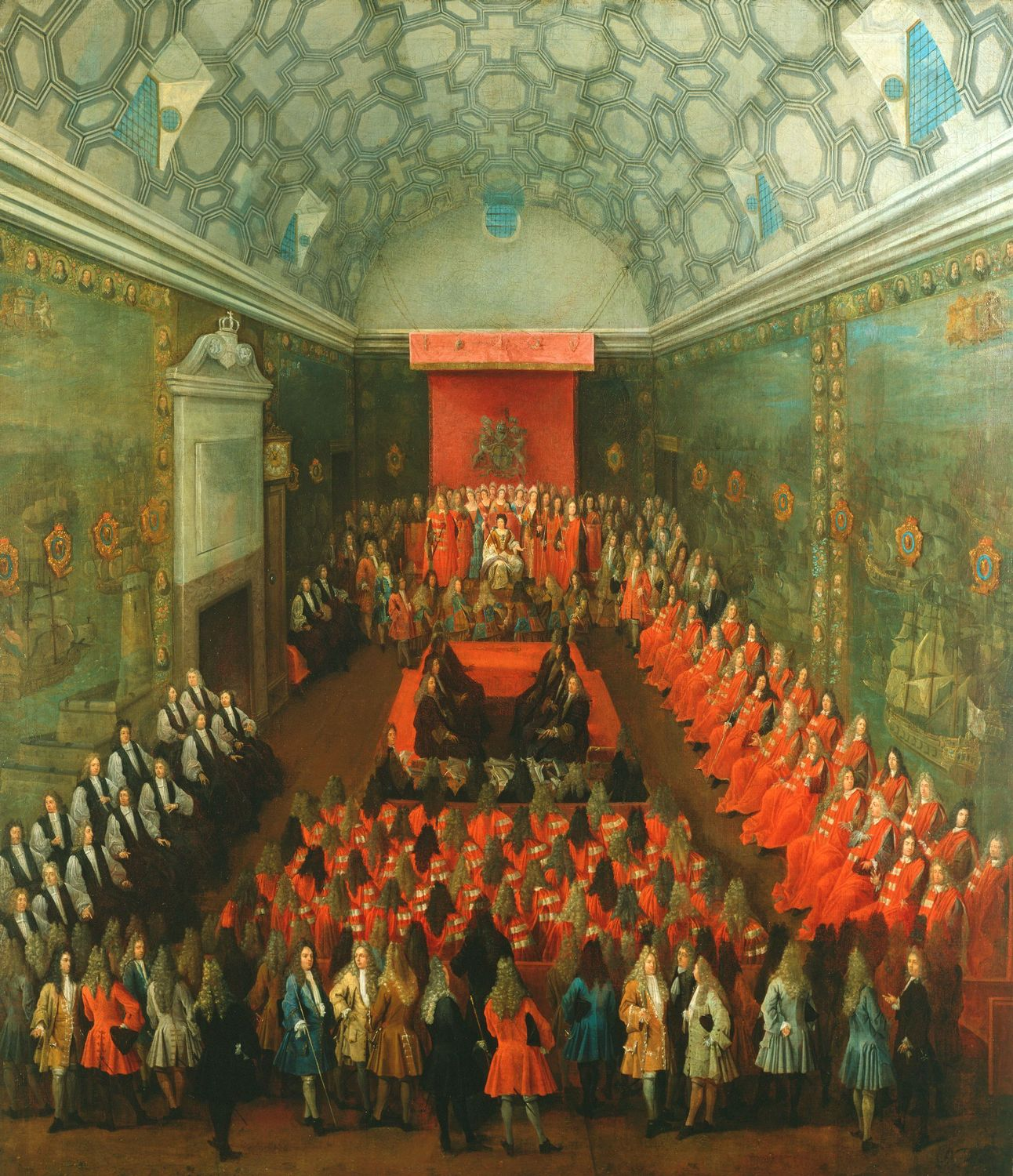
Queen Anne in the House of Lords, 1708–14

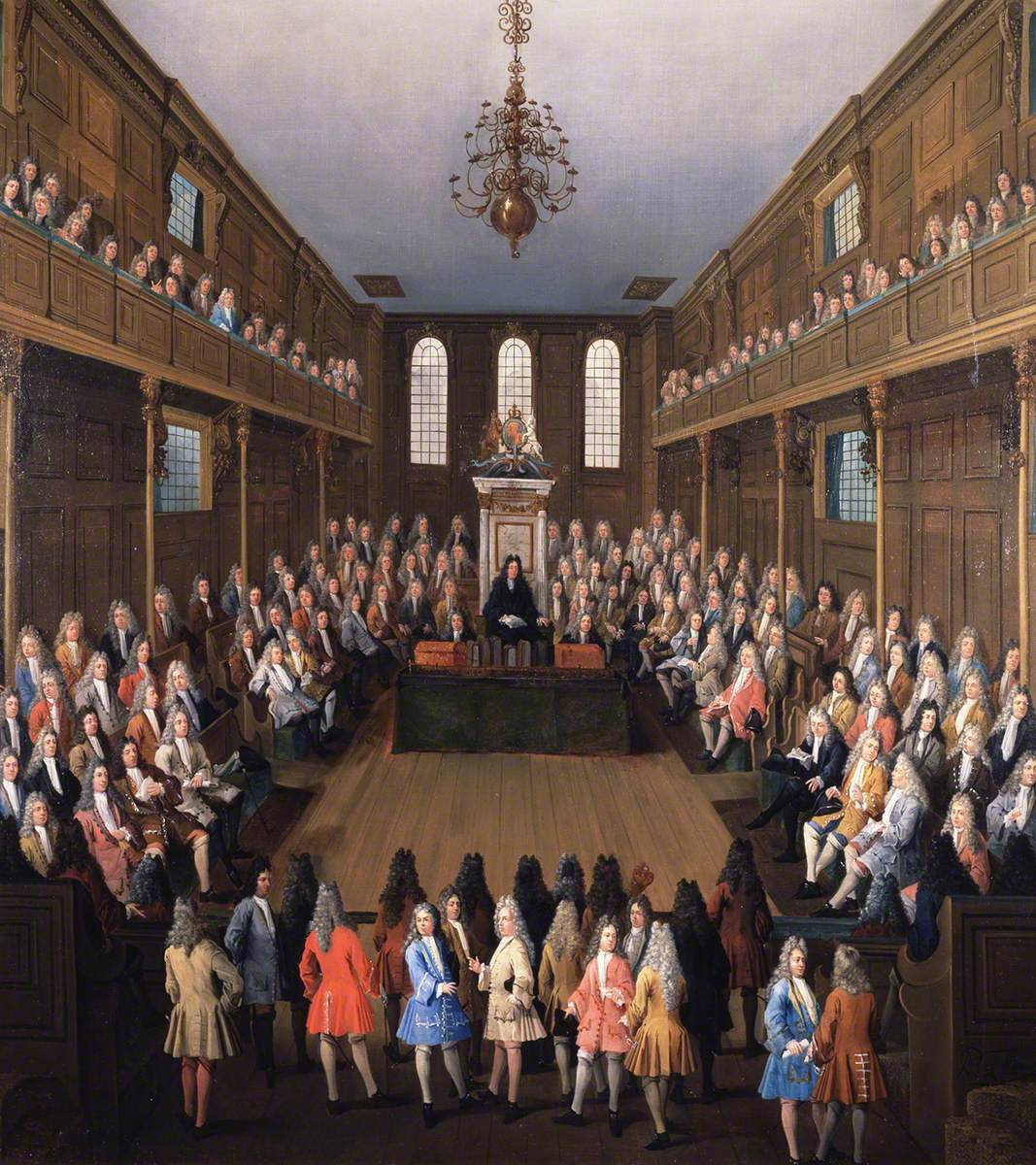
Interior of the House of Commons In Session, c. 1710

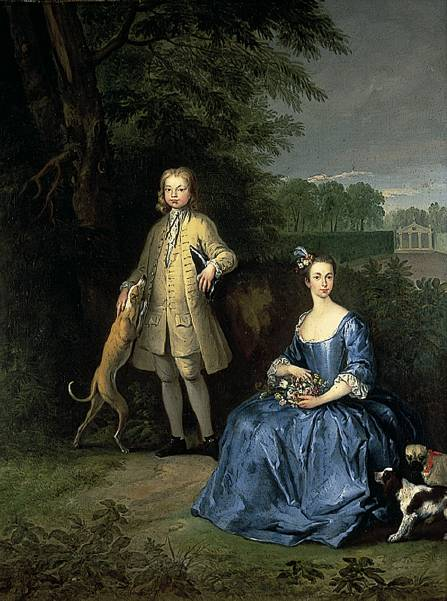
Portrait of Master Edward and Miss Mary Macro, the children of Revd Dr Cox Macro, c. 1733

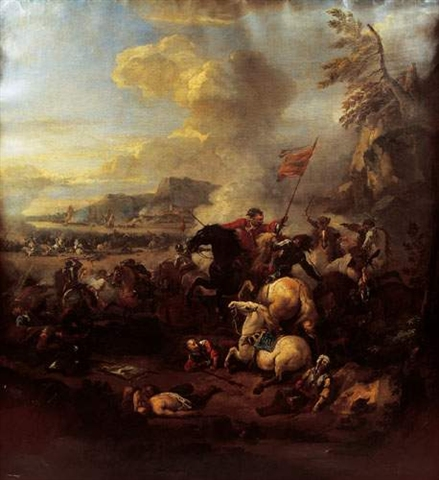
Charge de cavalerie

- Anne Reade, Mrs Myddelton, Chirk Castle
- The Artist's Studio, c. 1716, Norwich Castle Museum and Art Gallery
- The Battle of Belgrade, Chirk Castle
- The Battle of Glenshiel 1719, 1719, Scottish National Portrait Gallery
- Battle Scene, Norwich Castle Museum and Art Gallery
- Bird's eye view of Clevedon Court, Clevedon Court
- Castor Church South View (drawing) c. 1719
- Charge de cavalerie
- Chester and the Roodee, Grosvenor Museum, Chester
- Chirk Castle from the North, National Museum Cardiff
- Dead game, Audley End House
- The Duke of Kent's Family, Tate Britain
- Figures in a landscape, Harris Museum
- Four Hounds with Gentlemen Shooting, Norwich Castle Museum and Art Gallery
- Four Hounds with Huntsmen to the Right, Norwich Castle Museum and Art Gallery
- Foxhunting in Wooded Country, c. 1720–30, Tate Britain
- Harrow School and church, Harrow School (Old Speech Room Gallery)
- Horse with Groom and Hounds, Norwich Castle Museum and Art Gallery
- Hunting Piece: Going a Hunting with Lord Biron's Pack of Hounds, Norwich Castle Museum and Art Gallery
- Ideal Landscape. Verso: Landscape Composition with Travellers, Gibbets and Wheels in the Distance, 1728, Tate Britain
- Interior of the House of Commons in Session, c. 1710, Palace of Westminster Collection
- Isola Bella, Lago Maggiore, Belton House
- Landscape with castle on a hill, Courtauld Institute of Art Gallery
- Little Haugh Hall, Suffolk, Norwich Castle Museum and Art Gallery
- Llangollen and the Dee Bridge, Chirk Castle
- London from Greenwich Park, Bank of England
- Mary Lidell, Mrs Mydellton, Chirk Castle
- Mary Lidell, Mrs Mydellton and her son Richard, Chirk Castle
- New Hall, Bodenham, Salisbury and South Wiltshire Museum
- Newstead Abbey from the West, Newstead Abbey
- Newmarket: the Long Course, 1723, Government Art Collection
- The Newmarket Watering Course, Norwich Castle Museum and Art Gallery
- A nobleman out shooting over his pointers in his park, Inland Revenue
- The Noblemen's and Gentlemen's Several Strings or Trains of Running Horses, taking their Exercise up the Watering Course on the Warren Hill at Newmarket (engraving and etching), Government Art Collection
- Park Landscape (watercolour (brown), pen and ink (brown) on paper), Courtauld Institute of Art Gallery
- Le passage du gué (grey and black wash, ink and white heightenings), c. 1720
- Portrait of Master Edward and Miss Mary Macro, the children of Revd Dr Cox Macro, c. 1733, Norwich Castle Museum and Art Gallery
- Portrait of a Nobleman on Horseback, a Palace and Gardens Beyond
- Prospect Of Ashburnham Place Sussex
- A Prospect of the Town of Stanford, from Parsons Cross (coloured engraving), 1719, Government Art Collection
- Queen Anne in the House of Lords, c. 1708–14, Royal Collection
- The Round Course or Plate Course, with diverse Jockeys and Horses in Different Actions and Postures, going to Start for the King's Plate at Newmarket (engraving and etching), Government Art Collection
- The Royal Hospital from the South Bank of The River Thames, Royal Hospital Chelsea
- The South Garden at Wrest Park, the Seat in the Duchess's Square, c. 1729–30
- Spruce and bell, Newstead Abbey
- The Thames at Twickenham, c. 1724
- Three Hounds with Sportsman, a Hunt to the Left, Norwich Castle Museum and Art Gallery
- Two racehorses with grooms and hounds in the grounds of Newstead Abbey, Newstead Abbey
- A view of Chatsworth House and Park with horses and figures, Inland Revenue
- View on the Downs near Uppark, Uppark, West Sussex
- A View of the Garden and House at Upper Winchendon, Buckinghamshire, Buckinghamshire County Museum
- The View of a Horse Match over the Long Course at New Market
- View of Leicester from the South, Government Art Collection, Marlborough House
- View of Newmarket Heath, Government Art Collection
- A View of Richmond from Twickenham Park, 1720s, Orleans House Gallery
- A View from Richmond Hill
- View of the Thames from Richmond Hill, 1720–3, Government Art Collection
- View of a Town, Fitzwilliam Museum
- View of Uppark from the South-west, Uppark, West Sussex
- The Warren Hill at New Market
- Windsor, Anglesey Abbey
- Young Squire on Horseback With Dog at Heel

== Bibliography ==
- Robert Raines, "Peter Tillemans, Life and Work, with a List of Representative Paintings", Journal of the Walpole Society, vol. XLVII, 1980, pp. 21–59
- Bruce A. Bailey (ed.), "Northamptonshire in the Early Eighteenth Century: the Drawings of Peter Tillemans and Others", The Publications of the Northamptonshire Record Society, vol. XXXIX, 1994/1996
