= Sebastian Pether =

English painter (1793–1844)

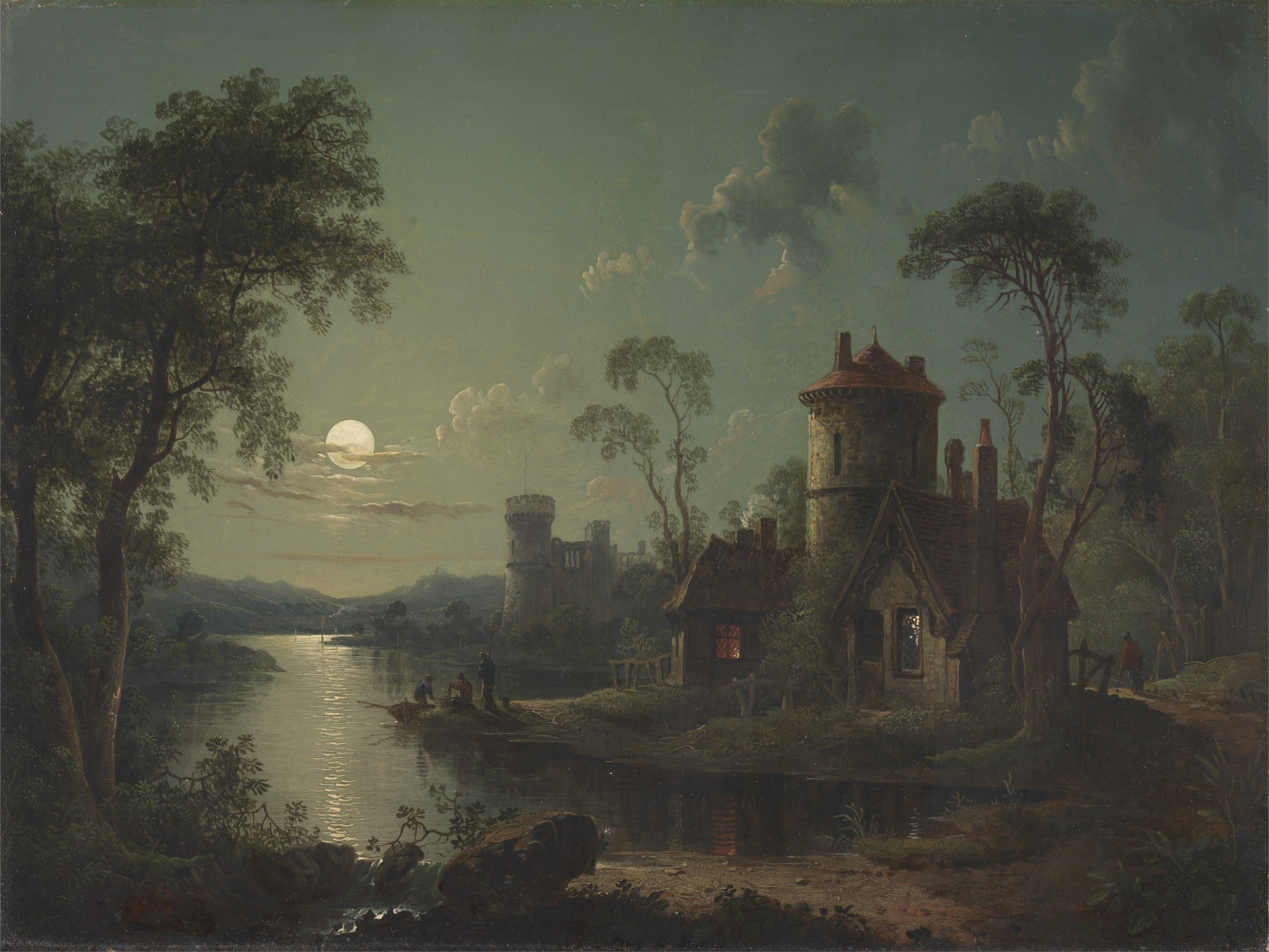
River Scene (1840) by Sebastian Pether

Sebastian Pether (24 November 1793 – 14 March 1844) (Note: Pether's birth is often stated to have taken place in the year of 1790, but public birth and christening records show he was born on 24 November 1793.) was an English landscape-painter who specialised in painting moonlight, sunset, and firelight. His father Abraham Pether and brother Henry Pether also specialised in moonlit paintings, the three were known as the "Moonlight Pethers". Sebastian's work tended to have greenish tones. The bulk of his work was managed through art dealers who helped him sell his paintings, but resulted in little income to support his large family of eleven. Pether died at the age of 51, leaving his family reliant on subscriptions raised after his death.

== Life ==
Sebastian William Thomas Pether was born on 24 November 1793 to Abraham and Elizabeth Pether and he was baptised at Saint Luke's Church in Chelsea, London on 31 August 1794. The eldest son, he was a pupil of his father, and followed him in subject matter, but led a beleaguered life. Pether married young and had a large family of nine children, and had few opportunities to create commissioned works and his works were not often exhibited, forcing him to work for dealers at low wages. He was well-educated, and even claimed to have first proposed the idea of a stomach-pump to the surgeon Andrew Jukes. During the last years of his life he lost three children to consumption and after his death another to lockjaw; his eldest son William became a mosaic artist. Pether died at Battersea of an inflammatory attack on 14 March 1844 at York Cottage, Battersea Fields, and a subscription was raised for his family. (Note: Urban states that Pether died on 18 March 1844, perhaps this was his date of burial.) Charity was raised for his surviving daughter in a November 1876 issue of the London Times, who was said to be destitute after ruining her eyesight working as a needlewoman.

== Works ==
Pether's main works consisted in firelights, moonlights and sunsets. In 1814 Pether sent to the Royal Academy View from Chelsea Bridge of the Destruction of Drury Lane Theatre, and in 1826 A Caravan overtaken by a Whirlwind, a commission from John Fleming Leicester, who was his only patron. In the spring of 1842, three pictures which, with the help of a frame-maker, he sent to the Royal Academy, were rejected. Sebastian Pether's paintings are frequently incorrectly attributed to his brother Henry Pether and vice versa. However, Henry generally signed his paintings and they were more realistic and refined.

== Gallery ==
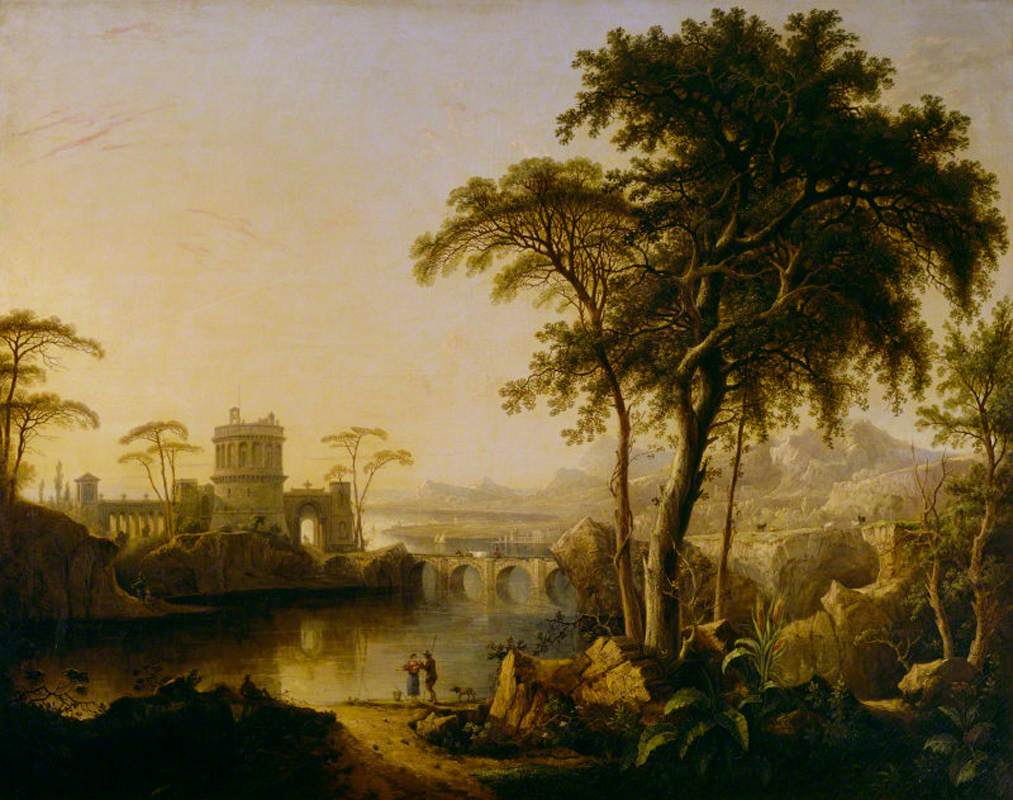
A River Landscape with a Castle at Sunrise

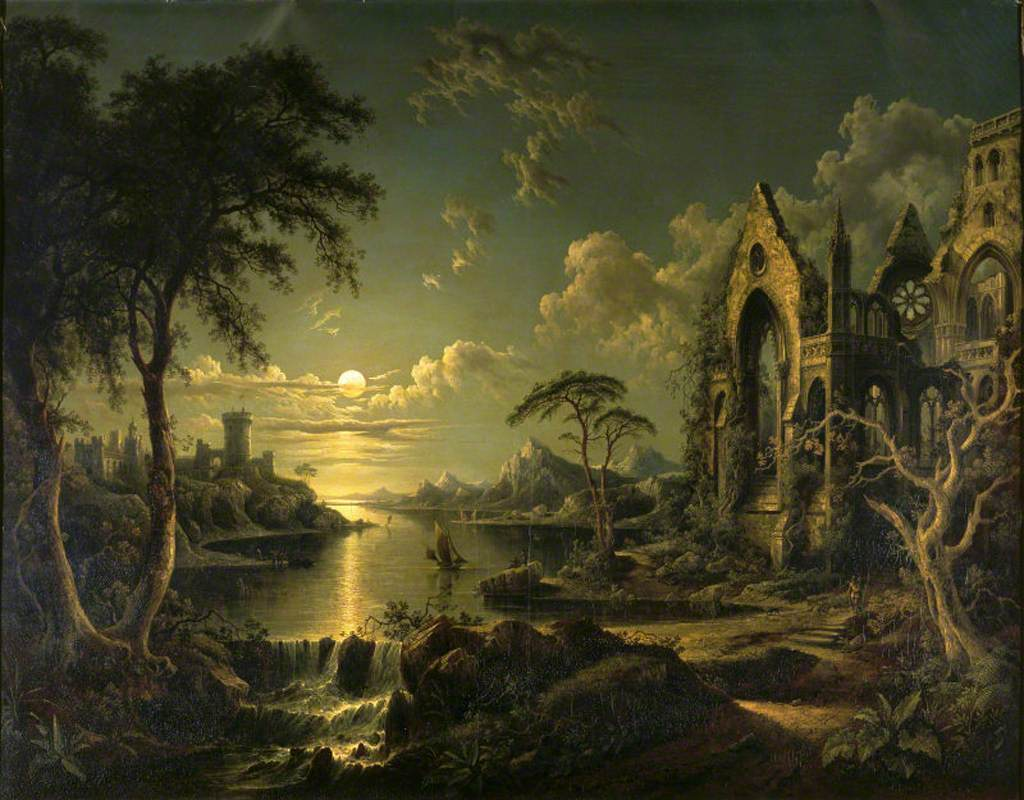
A Ruined Gothic Church beside a River by Moonlight

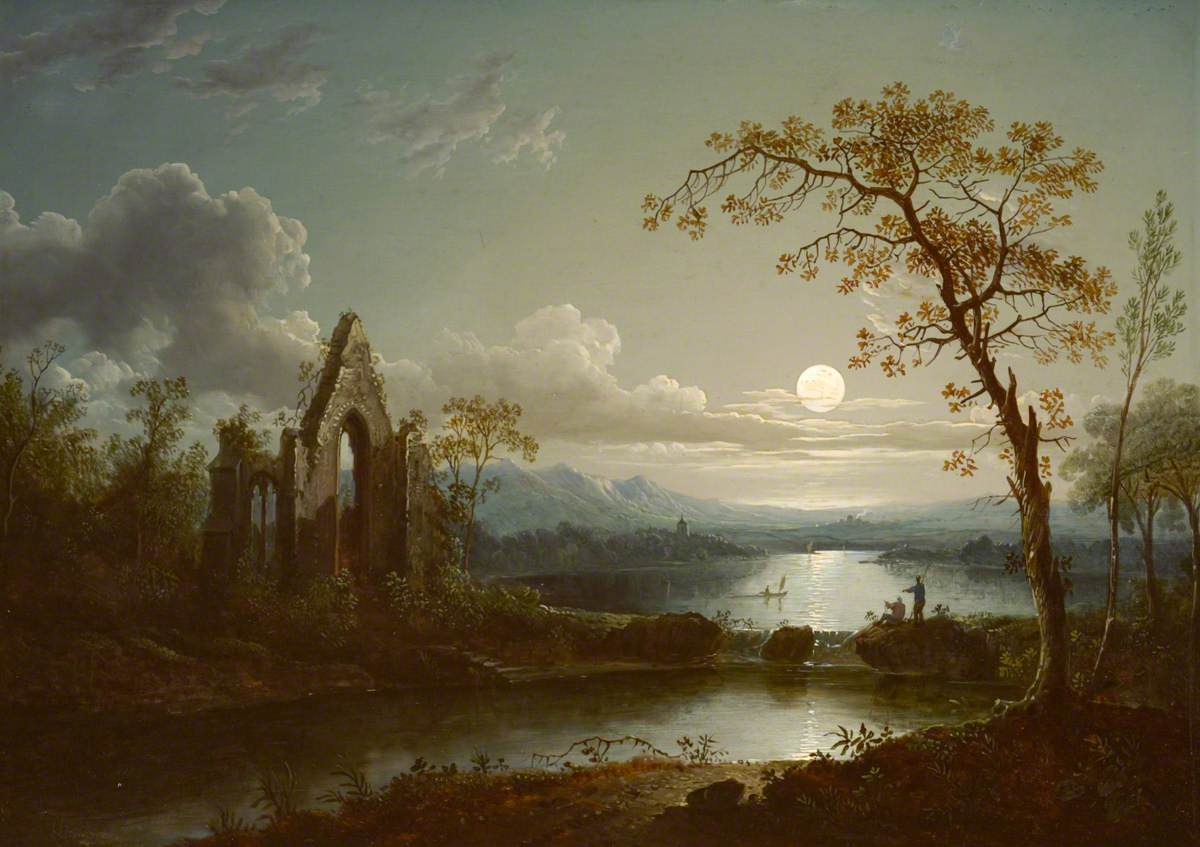
Moonlit Landscape with a Gothic Ruin

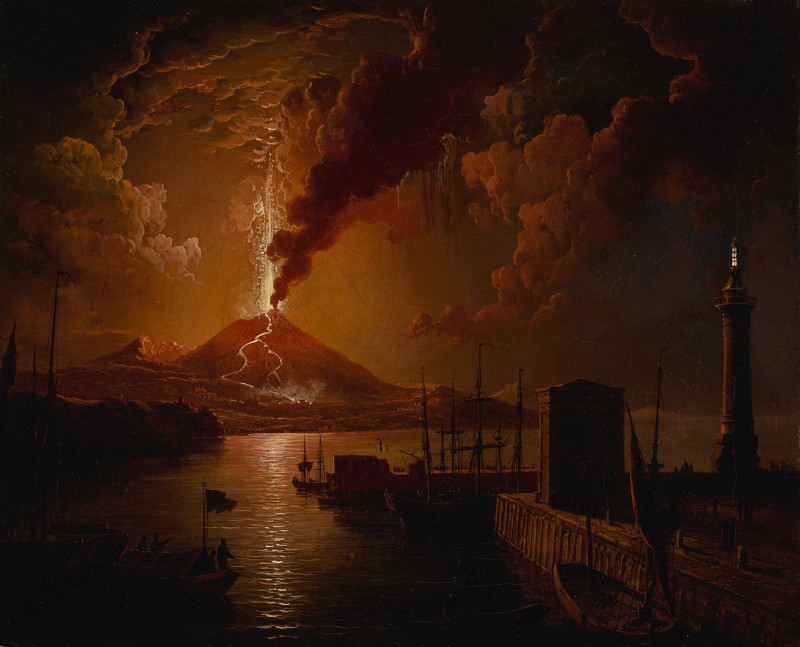
The Bay of Naples

== See also ==
- Night in paintings (Western art)
