= Henry Pether =

English landscape painter

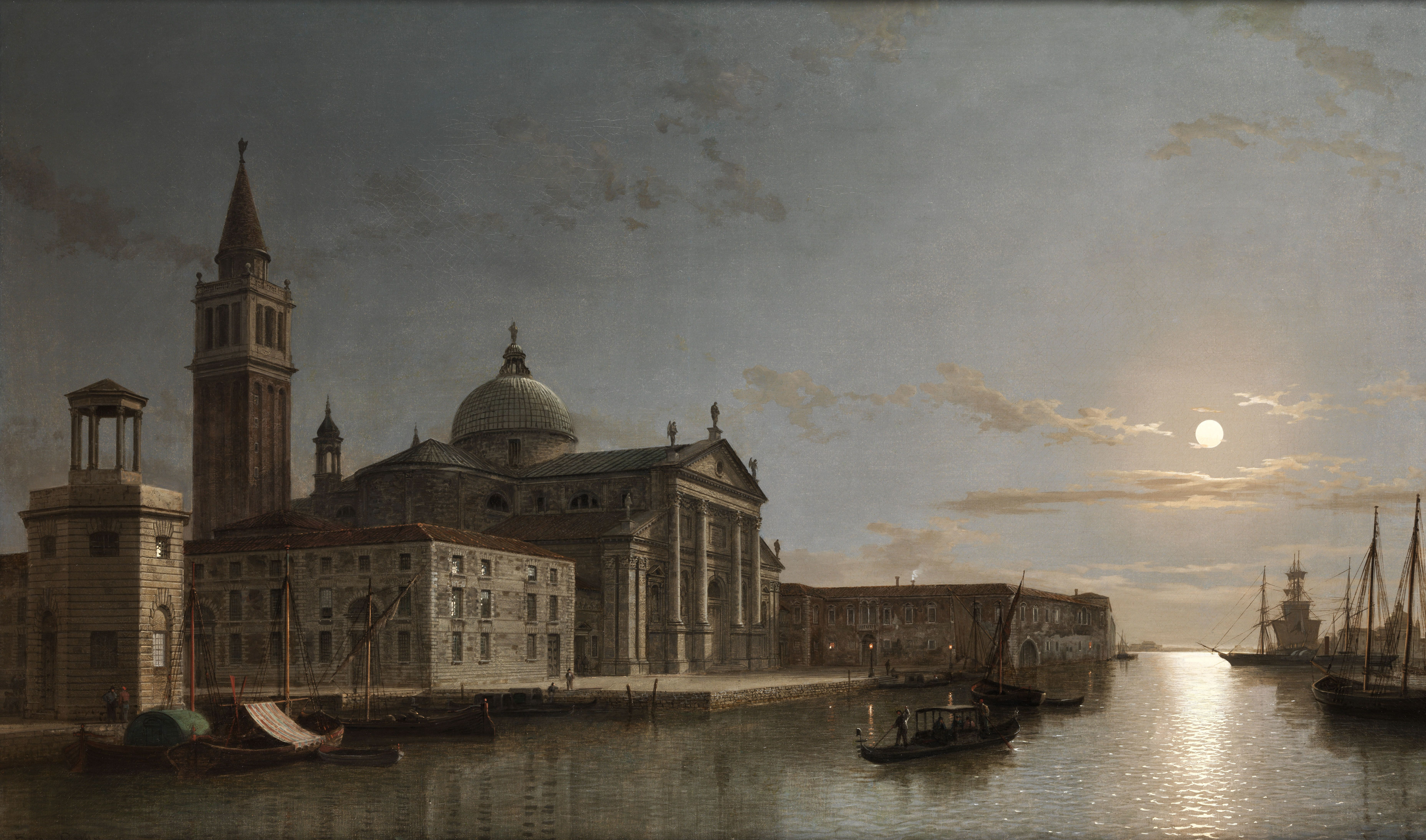
- San Giorgio Maggiore by Moonlight by Henry Pether
- Born: February 1800
- Died: 20 February 1880 (aged 79–80); London
- Occupation: Landscape Painter

Henry Pether (1800–1880) (Note: His birth and death dates are often listed as 1828–1865, but this is in fact the period in which he exhibited.) was an English landscape painter famous for his depiction of moonlit scenes of 19th century Britain, Paris, and Venice. His father Abraham and older brother Sebastian Pether also painted moonlit scenes. Together they were known as the "Moonlight Pethers". He was also an inventor of lamps, architectural materials, and tiles.

== Life and work ==
Henry Pether was born in February 1800, the son of landscape painter Abraham Pether (1752–1812) and younger brother of artist Sebastian Pether (1793-1844). His father and his brother's works were often imaginary. Henry was particularly noted for his "control of detail, atmosphere and colouring". Henry Pether's paintings are frequently incorrectly attributed to his father and to his brother and vice versa. However, Henry generally signed his paintings, which were more realistic and refined, whilst those of his brother Sebastian had more greenish tones.

He was known for his paintings along the Thames, many of which were painted between 1850 and 1865. Pether is detailed in his painting of Greenwich Hospital's architecture and river scene, which are illuminated by a full moon. He also painted moonlight landscapes in Paris, Venice and Scotland.

In Twickenham by Moonlight the English picturesque style has been combined with the romanticism of artists such as Caspar David Friedrich (1744–1840). The interplay of light and shade is here examined to full effect, creating a hermetic, contemplative mood. The landscape is dominated by the Thames, which reflects the subtle glow of the full moon above.

— Mark De Novellis, Highlights of the Richmond Borough art collection

Between 1828 and 1862 Henry Pether exhibited at the Royal Academy. He also exhibited at the British Institution and with the Royal Society of British Artists. His works are among the collections of Tate, the City of London, Royal Museums Greenwich, Hastings Museum, the National Gallery of Victoria, and the Yale Center for British Art.

Pether lived in the Camden and Clapham boroughs in London, and Southampton. (Note: There is a debate as to whether or not he ever lived in Greenwich. Hemming stated that Pether did not live in Greenwich. The Government Art Collection and other sources state that he had lived in Greenwich. In addition, the notice for his placement in debtors' prison identified a number of places he had lived by 1837, including Greenwich.) In 1837, he was described as a surveyor, engineer, (Note: He was a surveyor and engineer in the Prospectus of the London and Portsmouth Direct Railway in 1836.) artist, and an architect when he was an inmate in a debtors' prison in London. He applied for patents for lamps, architectural materials, and tiles, the latter of which was exhibited at the Great Exhibition of 1851. At that time, he was married to Sarah and had three children: Fanny, Harry, and Kate who ranged from nine to fourteen years of age. The family lived at Kennington in 1851.

He died on Stockwell Green in London on 20 February 1880, a few days after his 80th birthday. (Note: Trinity House states that Pether died in the workhouse in Chelsea.) Papers, images, and other documentation of Pether's works are held at the Frick Art Reference Library.

== Gallery ==
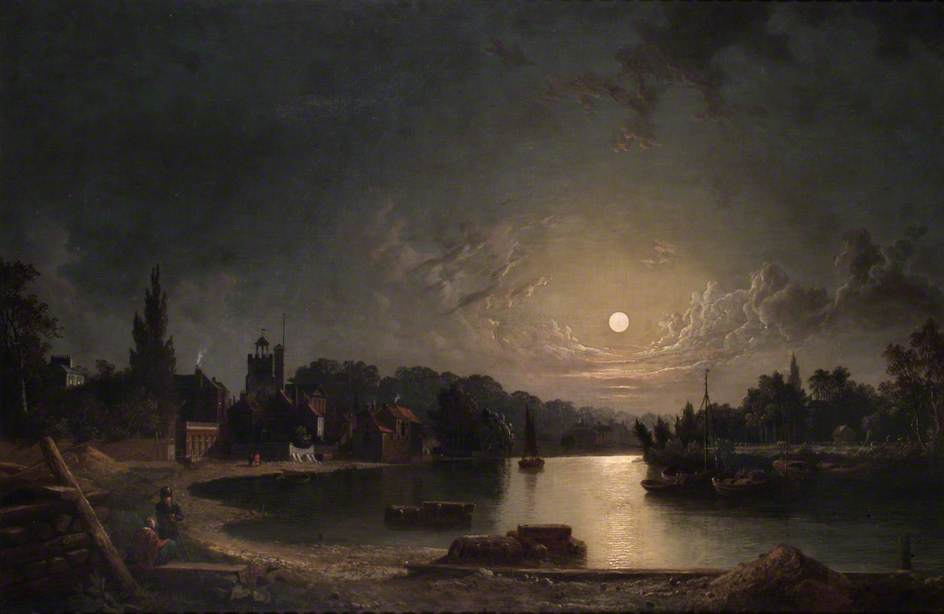
Twickenham by Moonlight, 1835

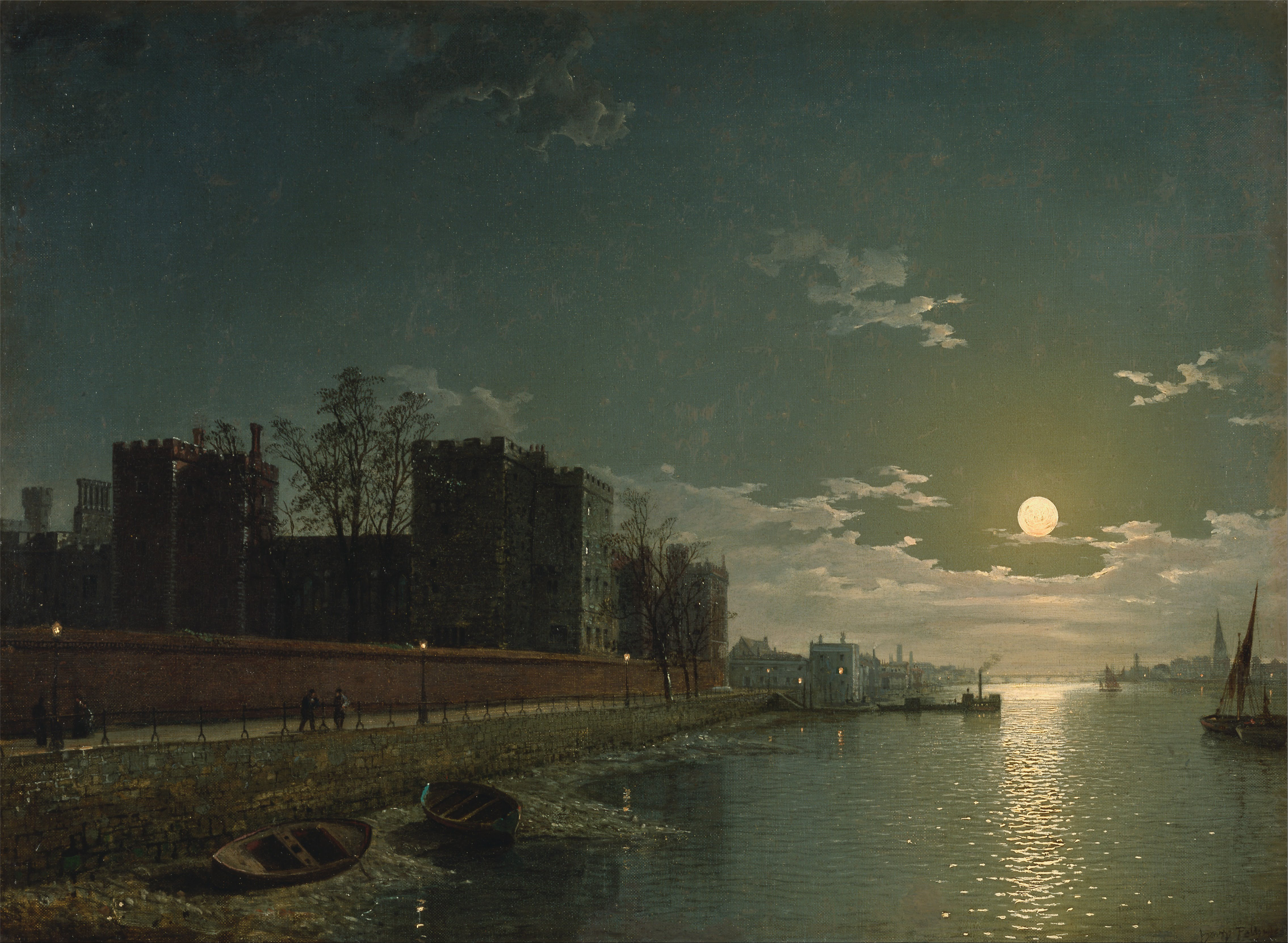
Lambeth Palace from the River Thames

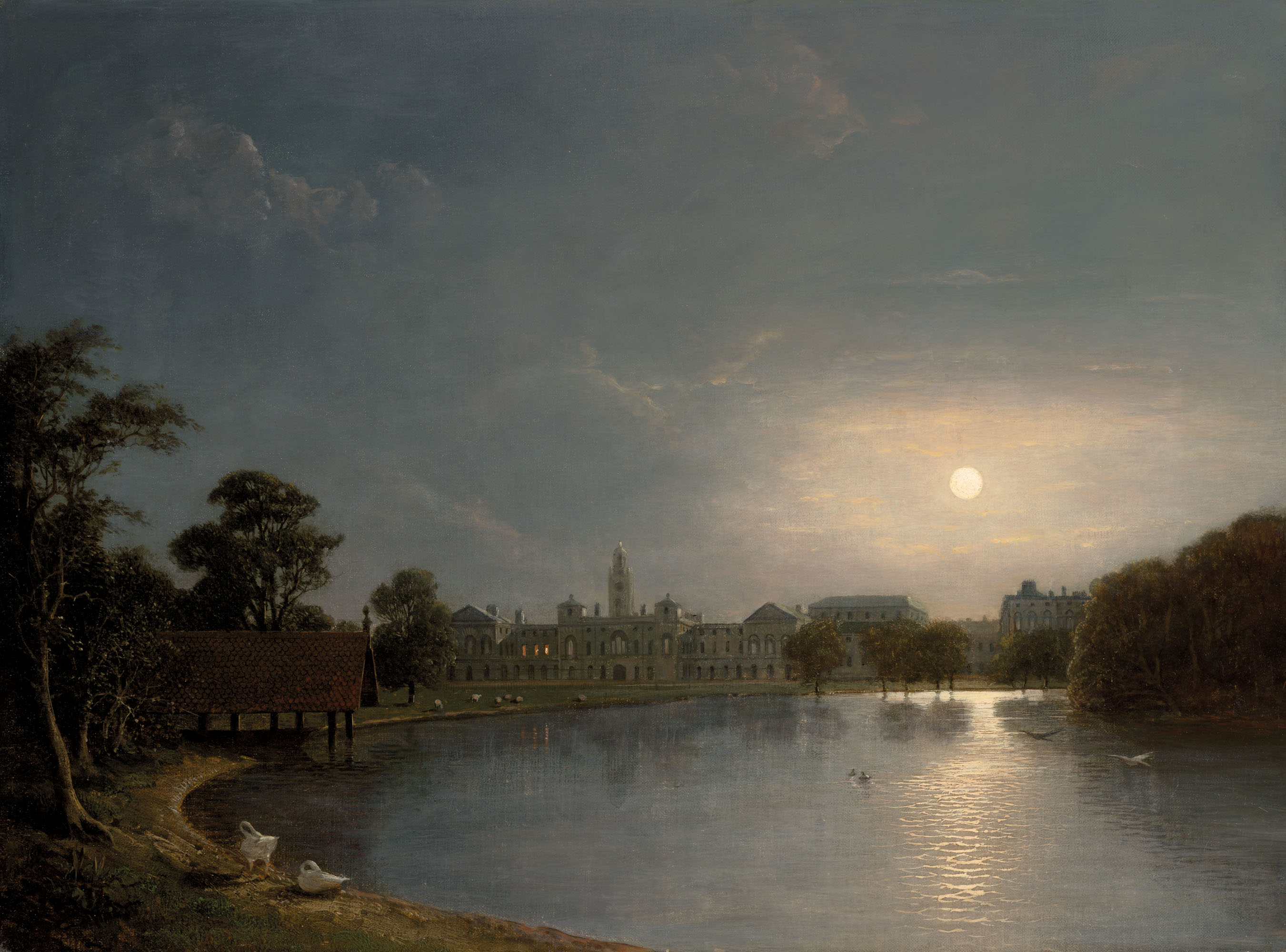
Horseguards Parade from St James' Park

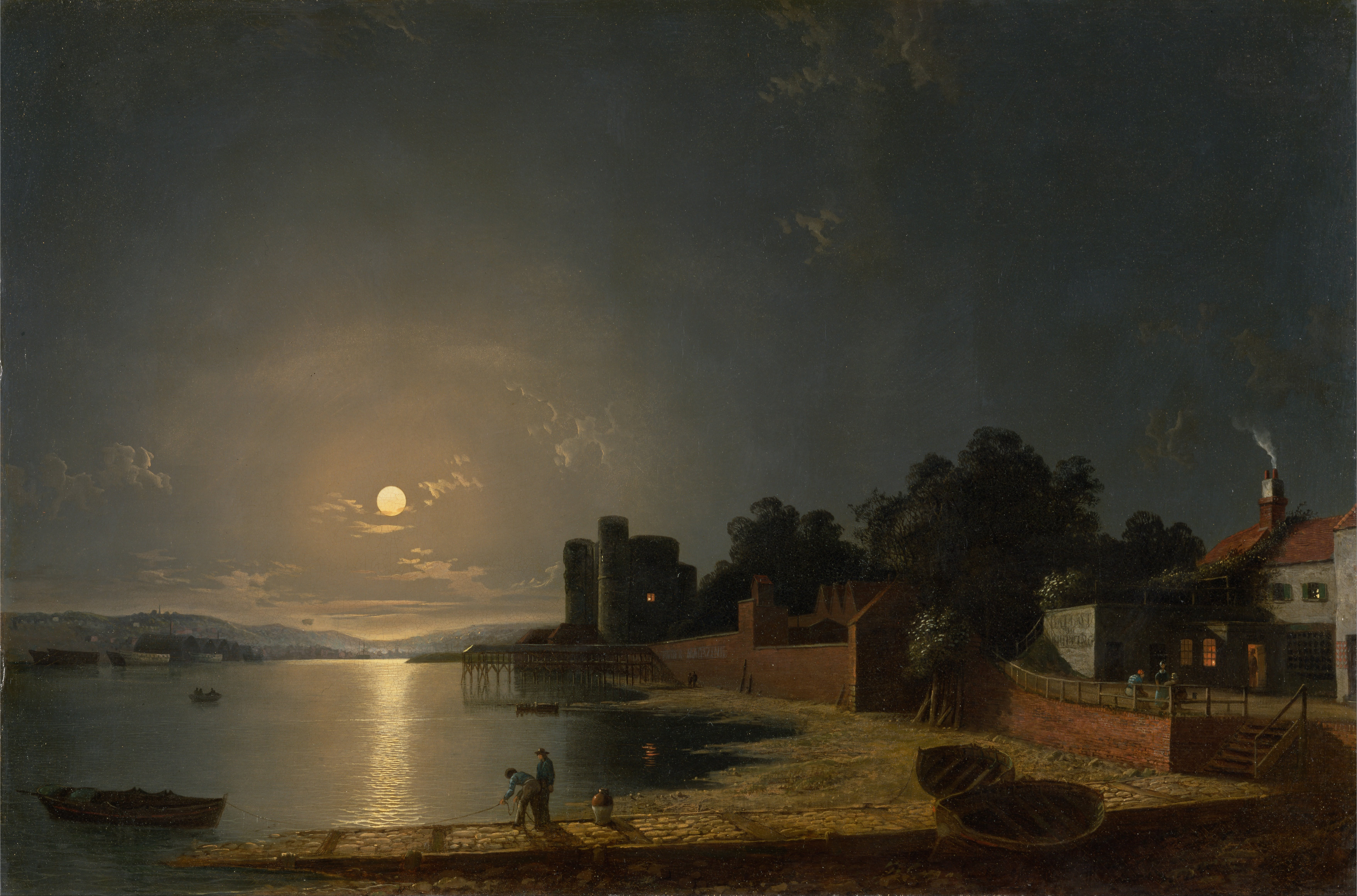
Upnor Castle, Rochester, Kent

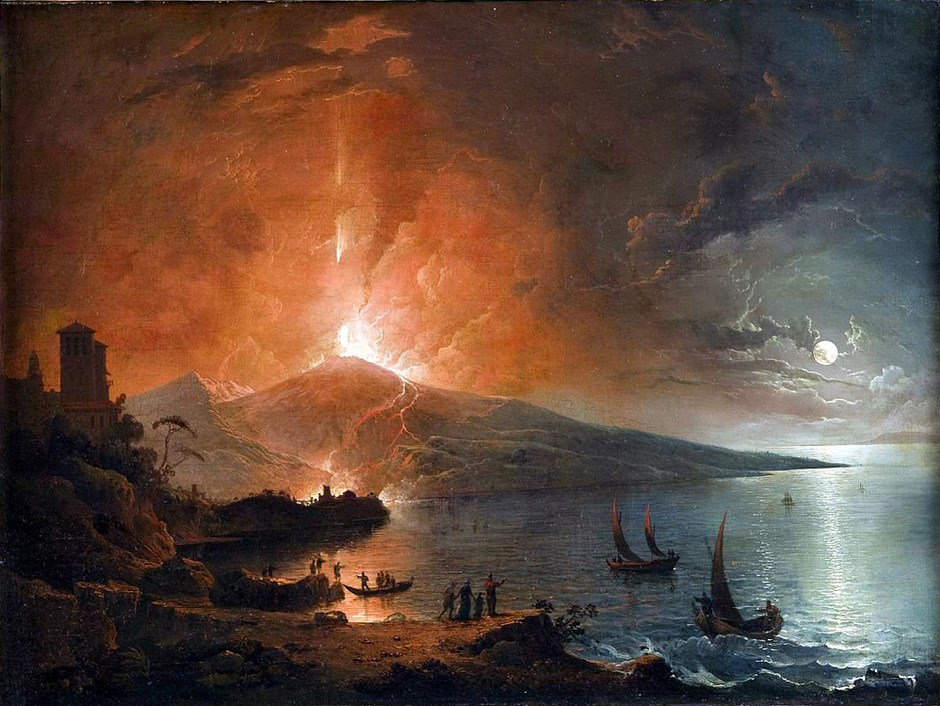
Vesuvius Erupting

== See also ==
- Night in paintings (Western art)
